= Brian Cuthbertson =

Canadian historian (1936–2023)

- Born: Brian Craig Uniacke Cuthbertson; 1936; Sackville, New Brunswick, Canada
- Died: 15 July 2023 (aged 87)
- Occupations: Historian; writer
- Years active: 1978–2016
- Notable work: The Loyalist Governor: Biography of Sir John Wentworth (1983)

Brian Craig Uniacke Cuthbertson (1936 – 15 July 2023) was a Canadian historian in Nova Scotia. Cuthbertson served in the Canadian Army with the Black Watch before retiring in 1970 and earning his PhD in war studies. He was the head of the Public Records Division of the Public Archives of Nova Scotia for 10 years, and served as head of the heritage unit at the Nova Scotia Department of Tourism and Culture from 1984 to 1995.

Cuthbertson was the founding editor of the Journal of the Royal Nova Scotia Historical Society. He wrote a variety of books concerning Nova Scotian history across his career, and was the winner of the Evelyn Richardson Award in 1984 for his book The Loyalist Governor. His final book, Stubborn Resistance, was published in 2016 and nominated for the Atlantic Book Award for Scholarly Writing.

== Early life ==
Brian Cuthbertson was born in 1936 in Sackville, New Brunswick, to parents Arnold Craig and Eileen Mary (née Odevaine) Cuthbertson. As a teenager, he served in the Canadian Army Reserve Force, subsequently joining the regular forces while earning his Bachelor of Arts at McGill University. After graduating from McGill, Cuthbertson attended the University of New Brunswick where he received a Master of Arts.

After earning his Master of Arts, Cuthbertson continued serving in the Canadian Army with the Black Watch, also known as the Royal Highland Regiment. He attended staff college in India, and travelled throughout Canada and Europe as part of his career in the military. Cuthbertson retired from the Canadian Army in 1970.

== Academic career ==
After retiring from the Canadian Army in 1970, Cuthbertson attended the University of London in England, where he earned his PhD in war studies and began accumulating a collection of antique maps and prints of the Atlantic provinces. In 1973, Cuthbertson moved to Halifax, Nova Scotia, where worked as the head of the Public Records Division of the Public Archives of Nova Scotia from 1974 to 1984. Following his employment at the Public Archives, he was the head of the heritage unit at the Nova Scotia Department of Tourism and Culture from 1984 until 1995, when he retired.

Cuthbertson began publishing books during his time at the Public Archives. In 1978, he released Canadian Military Independence in the Age of the Superpowers, which analyzes the decision-making and policies of the Canadian Armed Forces. His next book was a biography of Richard John Uniacke, The Old Attorney General, originally written as his Master of Arts thesis and published as a book in 1980. He was the winner of the Evelyn Richardson Award at the Atlantic Book Awards in 1984 for his book The Loyalist Governor: Biography of Sir John Wentworth.

After retiring in 1995, Cuthbertson worked as a freelance historical researcher, writing various publications and reports for the Halifax Regional Municipality (HRM), the Halifax Water Commission, the Historic Sites and Monuments Board of Canada, Starr Manufacturing Limited, and the Halifax Memorial Tower. He completed other projects such as a survey of lighthouses in HRM and research on commemorative stamps for Canada Post. Cuthbertson was the founding editor of the Journal of the Royal Nova Scotia Historical Society, and also served as editor for the Nova Scotia Historical Review.

== Later life and death ==
Cuthbertson continued writing before developing Alzheimer's disease in his early 80s. His final book was Stubborn Resistance: New Brunswick Maliseet and Mi'kmaq, published in 2016, and nominated for the Atlantic Book Award for Scholarly Writing the same year. Cuthbertson died on 15 July 2023, at the age of 87.

== Publications ==
- Cuthbertson, Brian (1978). Canadian Military Independence in the Age of the Superpowers. Don Mills, ON: Fitzhenry & Whiteside. ISBN 978-0-8890-2429-8. OCLC 317284529.
- — (1980). The Old Attorney General: A Biography of Richard John Uniacke. Halifax, NS: Nimbus Publishing. ISBN 978-0-9208-5207-1. OCLC 7212566.
- — (1981). The Journal of the Reverend John Payzant (1749–1834). Hantsport, NS: Lancelot Press. ISBN 978-0-8899-9143-9. OCLC 8248617.
- — (1983). The Loyalist Governor: Biography of Sir John Wentworth. Halifax, NS: Petheric Press. ISBN 978-0-9193-8043-1. OCLC 10353471.
- — (1987). The First Bishop: A Biography of Charles Inglis. Halifax, NS: Waegwoltic Press. ISBN 978-0-9692-9700-0. OCLC 20992021.
- — (1994). Johnny Bluenose. Halifax, NS: Formac Publishing Company. ISBN 978-0-8878-0294-2. OCLC 31292378.
- — (1996). Lunenburg: An Illustrated History. Halifax, NS: Formac Publishing Company. ISBN 978-0-8878-0358-1. OCLC 35972331.
- — (1996). Wolfville & Grand Pré: Past and Present. Halifax, NS: Formac Publishing Company. ISBN 978-0-8878-0360-4. OCLC 36044543.
- — (1997). John Cabot & The Voyage of the Matthew: Living History in Colour. Halifax, NS: Formac Publishing Company. ISBN 978-0-8878-0416-8. OCLC 43096806.
- — (2001). The Halifax Citadel. Halifax, NS: Formac Publishing Company. ISBN 978-0-8878-0517-2. OCLC 46703925.
- — (2002). Lunenburg: Then and Now. Halifax, NS: Formac Publishing Company. ISBN 978-0-8878-0566-0. OCLC 50185916.
- — (2009). Melville Prison and Deadman's Island: American and French Prisoners of War in Halifax 1794–1816. Halifax, NS: Formac Publishing Company. ISBN 978-0-8878-0837-1. OCLC 829106498.
- — (2016). Stubborn Resistance: New Brunswick Maliseet and Mi'kmaq in Defence of Their Lands. Halifax, NS: Nimbus Publishing. ISBN 978-1-7710-8346-1. OCLC 1468125623.
