= Demont (name) =

Demont or DeMont is a name. It may refer to:

== Given name ==
- Demont Mitchell (born 1988), American-Bahamian footballer

== Surname ==
- Adrien Demont (1851–1928), French painter
- Darrell Demont Chark Jr. (born 1996), American football player
- Francis Demont (fl. 1716–1717), pirate in the Caribbean
- Geoffrey Demont (born 1991), French squash player
- George Demont Otis (1879—1962), American painter
- John DeMont, Canadian writer and journalist
- Rick DeMont (born 1956), American swimmer
- Virginie Demont-Breton (1859–1935), French painter
- Yohan Demont (born 1978), French footballer
