= Alan Gordon =

Alan Gordon may refer to:

- Alan Gordon (actor), Canadian actor
- Alan Gordon (author) (born 1959), mystery writer whose works are based on Shakespearean characters
- Alan Gordon (Brookside), fictional character from the defunct soap opera Brookside
- Alan Gordon (historian) (born 1968), Scottish-born Canadian historian
- Alan Gordon (Scottish footballer) (1944–2010), Scottish footballer
- Alan Gordon (soccer) (born 1981), American soccer player
- Alan Gordon (songwriter) (1944–2008), American songwriter
- Alan Gordon (cricketer) (1944–2007), English cricketer
- Alan Gordon (athlete) (1932–2014), Scottish runner
- Al Gordon (born 1953), comic book artist
- Lin Gordon (1917–2011), Australian politician

== See also ==
- Allan Gordon, protagonist of The Surpassing Adventures of Allan Gordon by James Hogg
- Gordon P. Allen (1929–2010), U.S. Democratic politician
