= Eric Davidson (survivor) =

Halifax Explosion survivor (1915-2009)

John "Eric" Davidson (May 10, 1915—September 9, 2009) was a Canadian mechanic who was one of the last survivors of the Halifax Explosion. He was two years old when he was blinded by the Halifax Explosion on December 6, 1917. At the time of his death in 2009, Davidson was the penultimate living survivor with permanent injuries from the Halifax Explosion, which killed more than 1,600 people.

== Life ==
Davidson was born to parents Georgina (née Williams) and John William Davidson. He was blinded by shattered glass in the explosion, which occurred due to the collision between the SS Mont-Blanc and the SS Imo. At the time of the accident, Davidson was in his family's living room with his mother and sister. He was playing with his toy train on the window sill. The family was alerted to the collision by smoke rising from the harbour. Davidson was facing the glass windows when the blast occurred. The force of the explosion shattered the glass, completely blinding him.

Davidson and his family moved to Halifax Commons, a makeshift camp set up for survivors of the Explosion. He attended the Halifax School for the Blind, where he studied music. However, Davidson preferred to pursue a career in auto mechanics, following his interests in cars. His brothers would read him auto repair manuals and he would practise on old cars in his family's backyard, using his sense of touch and memory. He later took an apprenticeship with a car dealership in Halifax and earned his auto mechanic's licence.

Davidson was interviewed numerous times about his experience as a key eyewitness and survivor. Documented media coverage of Davidson spans decades, including a television interview in a CBC News piece first broadcast on December 1, 1957. Davidson also provided first person accounts of the disaster to several books and publications, including The Survivors: The Children of the Halifax Explosion and Shattered City: The Halifax Explosion and the Road to Recovery. “The Blind Mechanic” written by Eric’s daughter Marilyn Davidson Elliott chronicles his life paying tribute to him as a survivor, a father and a champion of courage.

Davidson, who lived in the city's north end, was employed by the City of Halifax as a mechanic until his retirement in 1980.

According to Janet Kitz, author of the book Shattered City: The Halifax Explosion and the Road to Recovery which chronicles the disaster, Davidson's death left just one living survivor still receiving a pension for long-term injuries sustained in the explosion.

Davidson resided in Berwick for the last few years of his life. He died on September 9, 2009, at Grand View Manor in Berwick, Nova Scotia, at the age of 94. His funeral was held at the United Memorial Church in Halifax.
