= Allan Marble =

Canadian historian

Allan Marble ONS
- Born: Allan Everett Marble; 1939 (age 86–87); Truro, Nova Scotia, Canada
- Education: Dalhousie University.
- Occupations: Biomedical engineer; genealogist; medical historian
- Notable work: Surgeons, Smallpox, and the Poor (1993)

Allan Everett Marble ONS (born 1939) is a Canadian biomedical engineer, genealogist and medical historian from Nova Scotia. Marble taught a variety of subjects in Nova Scotian universities for over 40 years, and is professor emeritus at Dalhousie University. He was awarded the Order of Nova Scotia in 2024.

== Biography ==
Allan Everett Marble was born in 1939 in Truro, Nova Scotia. He attended Colchester County Academy and Dartmouth High School, following which he earned a doctorate at Dalhousie University. He joined the Royal Canadian Army in 1963, serving as a Lieutenant until 1966.

Marble taught in Nova Scotian universities for over 40 years, beginning in 1967. He taught physics, mathematics, surgery, and biomedical engineering. As an associate professor at Dalhousie University's Department of Surgery, Marble's medical research focused on the cardiovascular system. He was the director of research there from 1988 to 1996, with his research contributing to improved vascular grafting outcomes in advanced cardiovascular surgery. During his time at Dalhousie, he helped to establish their School of Biomedical Engineering. He was named professor emeritus of Dalhousie University in 2000, and retired from teaching in 2010.

Marble is a certified genealogist. He was a founding member of the Genealogical Institute of the Maritimes in 1982, and was president of the Genealogical Association of Nova Scotia twice: first in the 1990s, and again from 2010 to 2015. He has served on the executive boards of the Royal Nova Scotia Historical Society and the Dalhousie Society for the History of Medicine; from 2016 to 2017, he was chair of the Medical History Society of Nova Scotia.

In 2024, Marble was appointed to the Order of Nova Scotia in recognition of his contributions to Nova Scotian heritage and biomedical engineering.

== Publications ==
=== Books ===
- Marble, Allan Everett (1986). Nova Scotians at Home and Abroad: Biographical Sketches of Over Six Hundred Native Born Nova Scotians. Hantsport, N.S.: Lancelot Press. ISBN 978-0-8899-9074-6. OCLC 28512566.
- — (1993). Surgeons, Smallpox, and the Poor: A History of Medicine and Social Conditions in Nova Scotia, 1749–1799. Montreal: McGill–Queen's University Press. ISBN 978-0-7735-0988-7. OCLC 28216061.
- — (2006). Physicians, Pestilence, and the Poor: A History of Medicine and Social Conditions in Nova Scotia, 1800–1867. Victoria, B.C.: Trafford Publishing. ISBN 978-1-4120-7912-9. OCLC 71002468.
- — (2007). The House that Sexton Built: A Century of Outstanding Graduates. Tantallon, N.S.: Glen Margaret Publishing. ISBN 978-1-8974-6204-1. OCLC 174138517.
- — (2020). Nova Scotia and the Great Influenza Pandemic, 1918–1920: A Remembrance of the Dead and an Archive for the Living. Halifax, N.S.: Nimbus Publishing. ISBN 978-1-7710-8915-9. OCLC 1159898374.
- — (2022). The History of Medicine in Nova Scotia from Confederation to Medicare. Halifax, N.S.: [s.n.] ISBN 978-0-9809-4181-4. OCLC 1303877298.

=== Genealogical works ===
- — (1966). The History and Genealogy of the Hingley Family. Halifax, N.S.: [s.n.] OCLC 789648750.
- — (1979). A Catalogue of Published Genealogies of Nova Scotia Families. Halifax, N.S.: Nova Scotia Historical Society. OCLC 5746251.
- — (1984). A Catalogue of Published Genealogies of Nova Scotia Families (2nd ed.). Halifax, N.S.: Genealogical Association of the Royal Nova Scotia Historical Society. OCLC 12017339.
- — (1986). The Descendants of James McCabe and Ann Pettigrew. Boston: New England Historic Genealogical Society. ISBN 978-0-8808-2015-8. OCLC 12945145.
- — (1990). Deaths, Burials, and Probate of Nova Scotians, 1749–1799: From Primary Sources. Halifax, N.S.: Genealogical Association of Nova Scotia. OCLC 25509920.
- — (1992). Genealogical research in Nova Scotia, 1951–1987. Halifax, N.S.: Genealogical Association of Nova Scotia. OCLC 71768433.
- — (1999). Deaths, Burials, and Probate of Nova Scotians, 1800–1850: From Primary Sources. Halifax, N.S.: Genealogical Association of Nova Scotia. ISBN 978-1-8959-8219-0. OCLC 43906833.
- — (2008). The Archibald Family of Nova Scotia: No Reward Without Effort. Halifax, N.S.: [s.n.] ISBN 978-0-9809-4180-7. OCLC 1156975466.
