= Judith Fingard =

Canadian historian

Judith Fingard FRSC
- Born: 1943 (age 82–83)
- Education: Dalhousie University; University of London
- Occupations: Historian; writer
- Notable work: The Dark Side of Life in Victorian Halifax (1989)
- Awards: Evelyn Richardson Award (1990)

Judith Fingard FRSC (born 1943) is a Canadian writer and historian. She taught at Dalhousie University from 1967 to 1997, and has served as President of the Canadian Historical Association and the Royal Nova Scotia Historical Society. She was elected a Fellow of the Royal Society of Canada in 1991.

== Biography ==
Fingard was born in 1943. She attended Dalhousie University, following which she earned her PhD from the University of London in 1970. Fingard taught history at Dalhousie from 1967 to 1997, and was the Dean of Graduate Studies from 1990 to 1995. In 1989, she held the position of Coordinator of Women's Studies at Dalhousie.

She has served as President of the Canadian Historical Association and the Royal Nova Scotia Historical Society. In 1991, she was elected a Fellow of the Royal Society of Canada.

Fingard is the author of an extensive body of book reviews, biographical entries, and scholarly articles. She has written six books across her career; including The Dark Side of Life in Victorian Halifax, which won the Evelyn Richardson Award at the Atlantic Book Awards in 1990.

== Publications ==
- Fingard, Judith (1972). The Anglican Design in Loyalist Nova Scotia, 1783–1816. London, UK: Society for Promoting Christian Knowledge. ISBN 978-0-2810-2610-4. OCLC 348027.
- — (1982). Jack in Port: Sailortowns of Eastern Canada. Toronto, ON: University of Toronto Press. ISBN 978-0-8020-2458-9. OCLC 8956619.
- — (1989). The Dark Side of Life in Victorian Halifax. Lawrencetown Beach, NS: Pottersfield Press. ISBN 978-0-9190-0158-9. OCLC 21762218.
- —; Guildford, Janet Vey; Sutherland, David (1999). Halifax: The First 250 Years. Halifax, NS: Formac Publishing Company. ISBN 978-0-8878-0490-8. OCLC 44039752.
- — (2005). Mothers of the Municipality: Women, Work and Social Policy in Post-1945 Halifax. Toronto, ON: University of Toronto Press. ISBN 978-1-4426-2746-8. OCLC 903968453.
- —; Rutherford, John (2008). Protect, Befriend, Respect: Nova Scotia's Mental Health Movement, 1908–2008. Halifax, NS: Fernwood Publishing. ISBN 978-1-5526-6275-5. OCLC 233522115.
