= Ian McKay (historian) =

Canadian historian

Ian McKay FRSC
- Born: Ian Gordon McKay; 1953 (age 72–73)

Academic background
- Education: Dalhousie University; University of Warwick
- Thesis: Industry, Work and Community in the Cumberland Coalfields, 1848–1927 (1983)
- Doctoral advisor: Michael Cross; Judith Fingard

Academic work
- Discipline: History
- Sub-discipline: Canadian history
- Institutions: Queen's University; McMaster University
- Doctoral students: Alan Gordon

Ian Gordon McKay FRSC (born 1953) is a Canadian historian who serves as Chair of the L.R. Wilson Institute for Canadian History at McMaster University. He was formerly a professor at Queen's University, Kingston, Ontario, where he taught from 1988 to 2015. During his time at Queen's, Ian supervised or co-supervised over 33 doctoral theses and 49 master's theses and cognate essays. His primary interests are Canadian cultural and political history, the economic and social history of Atlantic Canada, historical memory and tourism, and the history of liberalism, both in Canadian and transnational aspects. His long-term project is to write a comprehensive history of the Canadian left. He is the younger brother of poet Don McKay.

== Education ==
McKay earned his Bachelor of Arts degree in history from Dalhousie University in 1975. His honours essay was entitled The Working Class of Metropolitan Halifax, 1850–1889. He then travelled to Britain to study labour history at the University of Warwick in Coventry. He earned his master's degree there in 1976, with a dissertation entitled Trade Unionism in the Baking Industry in Great Britain and Ireland, 1857–1974. He then returned to Canada, again to Dalhousie University, where he completed his PhD, entitled, Industry, Work and Community in the Cumberland Coalfields, 1848–1927, under the supervision of Michael Cross and Judith Fingard. In the 1980s, he served on the editorial board of New Maritimes.

== Awards and honors ==
In 2009, McKay's Reasoning Otherwise: Leftists and the People's Enlightenment in Canada, 1890–1920 won the Sir John A. Macdonald Prize, awarded by the Canadian Historical Association for the best book written in Canadian history the previous year. His co-authored work, In the Province of History: The Making of the Public Past in Twentieth Century Nova Scotia, was awarded the 2010–2011 Pierre Savard Prize (International Council of Canadian Studies) for the best book on Canada in English or French. In 2014, McKay delivered the keynote address to the annual meeting of the Canadian Historical Association, and that same year was also elected a Fellow of the Royal Society of Canada. In September 2017, he was the recipient of an honorary DCL degree from Saint Mary's University. 2017 also saw McKay's book The Vimy Trap (co-authored with Jamie Swift) shortlisted for both the Sir John A. Macdonald Prize and the Shaughnessy Cohen Prize for Political Writing. In 2020, Radical Ambition: The New Left in Toronto (co-authored with Peter Graham) received the Floyd S. Chalmers Award for Ontario History.

== Liberal order framework ==
In the December 2000 issue of the Canadian Historical Review, McKay introduced a new framework for interpreting Canadian history. In "The Liberal Order Framework: A Prospectus for a Reconnaissance of Canadian History", McKay argues that "the category 'Canada' should henceforth denote a historically specific project of rule, rather than either an essence we must defend or an empty homogeneous space we must possess. Canada-as-project can be analyzed as the implantation and expansion over a heterogeneous terrain of a certain politico-economic logic – to wit, liberalism." However, far from simply charting victories along the road to liberal order, McKay's approach demands meticulous attention to points of resistance and struggle that shaped the particular contours of Canadian liberalism. Called "reconnaissance" in reference to its Gramscian inspiration, the strategy is at once anti-presentist in seeking to reconstruct the past in its own terms, and present-minded in linking historical findings to contemporary political concerns and ongoing struggles.

The piece has been called "one of the most influential articles ever published in Canadian historiography." According to Carleton University historian A. B. McKillop, McKay's framework has incited "Canadian historians to a degree not witnessed since [J. M. S.] Careless's 'limited identities' article inspired a generation of fledgling social historians in the seventies." The liberal order framework spawned a number critical essays first presented at the McGill Institute for the Study of Canada and subsequently published in 2008 as Liberalism and Hegemony: Debating the Canadian Liberal Revolution. The Underhill Review (Fall 2009) also featured a forum on "Ian McKay and the Liberal Order". And finally, the 2009 annual meeting of the Canadian Historical Association also saw a panel discussion devoted to the framework. It is currently listed as the most cited article ever published in the Canadian Historical Review.

McKay has expanded the approach in his multi-volume history of socialism and radicalism in Canada, entitled Realms of Freedom. Serving as the introduction is Rebels, Reds, Radicals: Rethinking Canada's Left History published by Between the Lines Press of Toronto. (It also served as "the inaugural volume in Provocations, a series of concise works advancing broad arguments, written by authors deeply immersed in their fields.") The first volume, Reasoning Otherwise: Leftists And The People's Enlightenment In Canada, 1890-1920, was published in 2008. The second book in the series, Revolution's Iron Gates: The Canadian Left and the Challenge of Modernity, 1921-1956 was originally scheduled for publication in 2013, but has yet to appear.

== Chair of L.R. Wilson Institute for Canadian History ==
In September 2015, McMaster University announced that McKay would be joining their Department of History as the L.R. Wilson Chair for Canadian history. McMaster's Dean of Humanities, Ken Cruikshank, stated: "Dr. McKay is the perfect scholar to lead the L. R. Wilson Institute for Canadian History as we approach the 150th anniversary of Confederation in 2017." McKay already has a vision for the institute, and has recently spoken about the need for historians to contribute to public discourse, and for Canadian historians engaging in a broader conversation that transcends the narrow confines of their own research. This latter theme is an echo of his article, "Liberal Order Framework", in which he decried the state of the field more generally.

== Selected works ==
- The Craft Transformed: An Essay on the Carpenters of Halifax, 1885–1985 (1985)
- People, Resources and Power: Critical Perspectives on Underdevelopment and Primary Industries in the Atlantic Region (co-edited with Gary Burrill, 1987)
- The Challenge of Modernity: A Reader on Post-Confederation Canada (ed., 1990)
- Toward A New Maritimes: A Selection from Ten Years of New Maritimes (co-edited with Scott Milsom, 1992) ISBN 0921556349
- The Quest of the Folk: Antimodernism and Cultural Selection in Twentieth-Century Nova Scotia (1994; CLS Edition 2009)
- For a Working Class Culture in Canada: A Selection of Colin McKay's Writings on Sociology and Political Economy (ed., 1995)
- Rebels, Reds, Radicals: Rethinking Canada's Left History (2005) ISBN 978-1-896357-97-3
- Reasoning Otherwise: Leftists and the People's Enlightenment in Canada, 1890-1920 (2008) ISBN 978-1-897071-49-6
- In the Province of History: The Making of the Public Past in Twentieth-Century Nova Scotia (co-author Robin Bates, 2010) ISBN 978-0-7735-3703-3
- Warrior Nation: Rebranding Canada in an Age of Anxiety (co-author Jamie Swift, 2012) ISBN 978-1-926662-77-0
- The Vimy Trap: Or, How We Learned to Stop Worrying and Love the Great War (co-author Jamie Swift, 2016) ISBN 978-1-77113-275-6
- Radical Ambition: The New Left in Toronto (co-author Peter Graham, 2019) ISBN 978-1-77113-423-1
- Left Transnationalism: The Communist International and the National, Colonial, and Racial Questions (co-edited with Oleksa Drachewych, 2020) ISBN 978-077-355-873-1
- Crisis and Contagion: Conversations on Capitalism and COVID-19 (ed., 2023) ISBN 978-1-77113-639-6

He is currently writing a biography of D. C. Harvey, a historian and the former Provincial Archivist of Nova Scotia (1931–1956), and also a co-authored (with Frank Cunningham) study of political scientist C. B. Macpherson. It is tentatively entitled A New Method of Liberty: Antonio Gramsci, C.B. MacPherson, and the Next Left.
