= Leonard Arthur Kitz =

First Jewish mayor of Halifax, Nova Scotia

Mayor of Halifax, Nova Scotia
- In office 1955–1957

Personal details
- Born: April 9, 1916 Halifax, Nova Scotia, Canada
- Died: January 30, 2006 (aged 89)
- Party: Liberal
- Spouse(s): Dr. Alice Duff Findlay (died 1969), Janet (née Brownlee) Kitz
- Education: Dalhousie University, Dalhousie Law School
- Occupation: Lawyer, politician

Military service
- Branch/service: Canadian Army
- Rank: Infantry officer
- Unit: Princess Louise Fusiliers

Leonard Arthur Kitz QC (April 9, 1916 – January 30, 2006) was the first Jewish mayor of Halifax, Nova Scotia (1955–1957).

== Biography ==
Born in Halifax, Nova Scotia, to Harry and Yetta (née Lesser) Kitz, he grew up with older sister Hildred Kitz (Silver) and younger brother Joe. He attended Halifax's Protestant school system, there being no state-supported school for non-Christians, and graduated from the Halifax Academy. He attended Dalhousie University, where he studied law, graduating from Dalhousie Law School in 1938.

With the outbreak of World War II in Europe, Kitz joined the Canadian Army becoming an infantry officer in the Princess Louise Fusiliers. During the war, he served in Italy and the Netherlands. After the war he served as a lawyer in military tribunals.

While serving in England in 1945, Kitz met and married Dr. Alice Duff Findlay. The two returned to Halifax after the war where Kitz opened his law firm, located on Granville Street. His law firm was eventually joined by Robert Matheson becoming Matheson and Kitz. Kitz served as President of the Nova Scotia Barristers' Society from 1968 to 1969.

In 1948, Kitz decided to enter politics and he was elected an alderman in Halifax. He served as an alderman from 1948 to 1955. Kitz is most remembered for his part as the 'driving force' behind the funding and construction of a statue of Winston Churchill which is a landmark on Halifax's Spring Garden Road. Kitz was the first Jewish mayor in the city's long history.

Kitz was re-elected in 1956, but two years later he resigned the mayorship to run, unsuccessfully, as a Liberal for parliament in the federal riding of Halifax. He was one of the founders of the city's most prestigious independent school, The Halifax Grammar School, opened in 1958.

Kitz' first wife died in 1969. He remarried in 1971 to Janet (née Brownlee) Kitz who became a noted historian of the Halifax Explosion and author of a number of books on the subject. The couple played an important leadership role in organizing public commemorations of the explosion.
