= George Otis =

George Otis may refer to:

- George Demont Otis (1879–1962), American landscape painter
- George L. Otis (1829–1882), lawyer and politician in Minnesota
