= Elizabeth Pacey =

Canadian writer

Elizabeth Pacey CM is a Canadian writer from Nova Scotia.

== Biography ==
Pacey worked as a high school teacher until 1972, when she quit to begin writing full-time. She was a vocal critic of high-rise development in the area surrounding the Halifax Citadel in the 1970s.

Pacey has served as President of the Heritage Trust of Nova Scotia. Her husband, Philip, also served as President. He died in 2016. Pacey is the author of several books; including Landmarks (1994), which won the Evelyn Richardson Award in 1995; and Miracle on Brunswick Street (2003), which won the Dartmouth Book Award for Non-Fiction in 2004.

In 2002, Pacey was awarded the Queen Elizabeth II Golden Jubilee Medal. She was invested into the Order of Canada on 4 May 2007.

== Publications ==
- Pacey, Elizabeth (1976). The Prince and Hollis Buildings. Halifax, NS: Heritage Trust of Nova Scotia. OCLC 3336084.
- — (1979). The Battle of Citadel Hill. Hantsport, NS: Lancelot Press. ISBN 978-0-8899-9101-9. OCLC 5457265.
- — (1983). More Stately Mansions: Churches of Nova Scotia, 1830–1910. Hantsport, NS: Lancelot Press. ISBN 978-0-8899-9210-8. OCLC 10765950.
- — (1985). Halifax Citadel. Halifax, NS: Nimbus Publishing. ISBN 978-0-9208-5247-7. OCLC 14036998.
- — (1987). Georgian Halifax. Hantsport, NS: Lancelot Press. ISBN 978-0-8899-9349-5. OCLC 17480143.
- — (1988). Historic Halifax. Photographs by Alvin Comiter. Willowdale, ON: Hounslow. ISBN 978-0-8888-2103-4. OCLC 977713546.
- — (1990). Halifax Pictorial Guide: Including Dartmouth & Bedford. Halifax, NS: Stone House Publishing. ISBN 978-0-9211-2829-8. OCLC 20531340.
- — (1991). Images of Citadel Hill. Halifax, NS: The Book Room. ISBN 978-0-9690-1777-6. OCLC 23649816.
- — (1994). Landmarks: Historic Buildings of Nova Scotia. Halifax, NS: Nimbus Publishing. ISBN 978-1-5510-9046-7. OCLC 32051064.
- — (2003). Miracle on Brunswick Street: The Story of St. George's Round Church and the Little Dutch Church. Halifax, NS: Nimbus Publishing. ISBN 978-1-5510-9464-9. OCLC 53252299.
