= William D. Naftel =

Canadian historian (1940–2018)

William Drummond Naftel (1 October 1940 – 29 April 2018) was a Canadian writer and historian from Nova Scotia. His 2008 book Halifax at War was the winner of the Evelyn Richardson Award, the Dartmouth Book Award for Non-Fiction, and the Democracy 250 Atlantic Book Award for Historical Writing.

== Biography ==
William D. Naftel was born on 1 October 1940 in Edmonton, Alberta. He attended the University of King's College and Dalhousie University in Halifax, Nova Scotia, following which he began a 30-year career with Parks Canada as a senior historian and manager. During his employment with Parks Canada, Naftel wrote the text for many commemorative historical plaques throughout Halifax. He wrote several books, most notably Halifax at War (2008), which won the Evelyn Richardson Award, the Dartmouth Book Award for Non-Fiction, and the Democracy 250 Atlantic Book Award for Historical Writing.

Naftel died in Halifax on 29 April 2018, at the age of 77.

== Publications ==
- Naftel, William D. (2005). Prince Edward's Legacy: The Duke of Kent in Halifax. Halifax, N.S.: Formac Publishing Company. ISBN 978-0-8878-0648-3.
- — (2006). The Building of All Saints Cathedral, Halifax, Nova Scotia. St. John's, N.L.: St. Agnes Press. ISBN 978-0-9683-7691-1.
- — (2008). Halifax at War: Searchlights, Squadrons and Submarines 1939–1945. Halifax, N.S.: Formac Publishing Company. ISBN 978-0-8878-0739-8.
- — (2009). Wartime Halifax: The Photo History of a Canadian City at War 1939–1945. Halifax, N.S.: Formac Publishing Company. ISBN 978-0-8878-0835-7.
- — (2015). Halifax: A Visual Legacy. Halifax, N.S.: Formac Publishing Company. ISBN 978-1-4595-0046-4.

== See also ==
- List of writers from Nova Scotia
- List of Canadian historians
