= Evelyn Richardson Award =

Canadian literary award

The Evelyn Richardson Memorial Non-Fiction Award is a Canadian literary award, presented annually by the Atlantic Book Awards & Festival, to the best work of adult non-fiction published in the previous year by a writer from Atlantic Canada. It is the oldest literary award in the region and is considered the most prestigious for a work of non-fiction. The award was named to honour Evelyn M. Richardson.

== Winners ==
- 1978 – Harry Bruce, Lifeline: the Story of the Atlantic Ferries and Coastal Boats
- 1979 – Alden Nowlan, Double Exposure
- 1980 – Joan Payzant and L.J. Payzant, Like a Weaver's Shuttle: a history of the Halifax-Dartmouth ferries
- 1981 – Kay Hill, Joe Howe: the Man who was Nova Scotia
- 1982 – Bruce Armstrong, Sable Island
- 1983 – J. Murray Beck, Joseph Howe: Volume 1, Conservative Reformer, 1804-1848
- 1984 – Brian C. Cuthbertson, The Loyalist Governor: Biography of Sir John Wentworth
- 1985 – Lilias M. Toward, Mabel Bell: Alexander's Silent Partner
- 1986 – P. B. Waite, The Man from Halifax: Sir John Thompson, Prime Minister
- 1987 – Tony Foster, Meeting of Generals
- 1988 – Harold Horwood, Dancing on the Shore: a Celebration of Life at Annapolis Basin
- 1989 – Dean Jobb, Shades of Justice: Seven Nova Scotia Murder Cases
- 1990 – Judith Fingard, Dark Side of Life in Victorian Halifax
- 1991 – Harry Thurston, Tidal Life: a natural history of the Bay of Fundy
- 1992 – Robert Pope, Illness and Healing: Images of Cancer
- 1993 – Sally Ross and J. Alphonse Deveau, The Acadians of Nova Scotia: Past and Present
- 1994 – Peter Brock, Variations on a Planet
- 1995 – Elizabeth Pacey, Landmarks: Historic Buildings of Nova Scotia
- 1996 – Simone Poirier-Bures, That Shining Place
- 1997 – Harry Thurston, The Nature of Shorebirds: Nomads of the Wetlands
- 1998 – Harry Bruce, An Illustrated History of Nova Scotia
- 1999 – Silver Donald Cameron, The Living Beach
- 2000 – Robin Metcalfe, Studio Rally
- 2001 – Joan Baxter, A Serious Pair of Shoes: An African Journal
- 2002 – Kent Thompson, Getting Out of Town by Book and Bike
- 2003 – Stephen Kimber, Sailors, Slackers and Blind Pigs: Halifax at War
- 2004 – Harry Thurston, Island of the Blessed: the Secrets of Egypt's Everlasting Oasis
- 2005 – Marq de Villiers and Sheila Hirtle, A Dune Adrift
- 2006 – Linda Johns, Birds of a Feather: Tales of a Wild Bird Haven
- 2007 – Linden MacIntyre, Causeway: A Passage from Innocence
- 2008 – Marq de Villiers, The Witch in the Wind: The True Story of the Legendary Bluenose
- 2009 – William D. Naftel, Halifax at War: Searchlights, Squadrons, and Submarines 1939-1945
- 2010 – John DeMont, Coal Black Heart: The Story of Coal and the Lives it Ruled
- 2011 – Laura Penny, More Money Than Brains: Why Schools Suck, College is Crap, and Idiots Think They're Right
- 2012 – Harry Thurston, The Atlantic Coast: A Natural History
- 2013 – Steven Laffoley, Shadowboxing: The Rise and Fall of George Dixon
- 2014 – Stephen Kimber, What Lies Across the Water
- 2015 – Kaleigh Trace, Hot, Wet, & Shaking: How I Learned to Talk About Sex
- 2016 – Gary Saunders, My Life With Trees
- 2017 – Erin Wunker, Notes from A Feminist Killjoy
- 2018 – John DeMont, The Long Way Home: A Personal History of Nova Scotia
- 2019 – Kate Inglis, Notes for the Everlost: A Field Guide to Grief
- 2020 – Ami McKay, Daughter of Family G: A Memoir of Cancer Genes, Love and Fate
- 2021 – Tyler LeBlanc, Acadian Driftwood: One Family and the Great Expulsion
- 2022 – Stephen Kimber, Alexa!: Changing the Face of Canadian Politics
- 2023 – El Jones, Abolitionist Intimacies
- 2024 – Karen Pinchin, Kings of Their Own Ocean: Tuna, Obsession, and the Future of Our Seas
- 2025 – Andrea Currie, Finding Otipemisiwak: The People Who Own Themselves
