= Vincenzo Pietropaolo =

Canadian photographer (born 1952)

- Born: 1951 (age 74–75); Italy
- Occupation: Photographer
- Known for: Social commentary
- Website: vincepietropaolo.com

Vincenzo Pietropaolo CM (born in 1951) is a Canadian photographer known for photographs that display an empathy for his subjects, who has focussed on documentary photography.

In 2011, Satu Repo wrote about the first of Pietropaolo's photographs to be published in 1971, in This Magazine. The photographs were of immigrant workers on strike outside Artistic Woodwork. She described the photographs as being "...remarkable in both their intensity and intimacy. You were face-to-face with these men, solemn but determined, exercising their right to organize. You couldn't help but share the photographer's clear empathy for them."

Since then, Pietropaolo's photographs have been widely published, have been the subject of gallery shows, and have won awards, including the Cesar E. Chavez Black Eagle Award (named in honor of Cesar Chavez).

During the 1970s and 1980s, Pietropaolo also worked in the field of city planning, choosing to devote himself exclusively to photography in 1991.

In 2025, Pietropaolo was appointed a Member of the Order of Canada.

== Works ==
- Vincenzo Pietropaolo; Frank Lewinberg (2025). Housing for All: How Toronto Built the St. Lawrence Neighbourhood. Cormorant Books. ISBN 9781770868120.
- Vincenzo Pietropaolo (2025). From Factory Worker to Senator: A Biography of Peter Bosa. Club Giuliano Dalmato di Toronto. ISBN 9781069266927.
- Vincenzo Pietropaolo (2023). Toronto as Community. Cormorant Books. ISBN 9781770866232.
- Vincenzo Pietropaolo; Mark Frutkin (2020). Where Angels Come to Earth. Longbridge Books. ISBN 9781928065159.
- Vincenzo Pietropaolo (2017). Ritual: Good Friday in Little Italy. Black Dog Publishing. ISBN 9781911164074.
- Vincenzo Pietropaolo; Catherine Frazee; Wayne Johnston (2010). Invisible No More: A Photographic Chronicle of the Lives of People With Intellectual Disabilities. Rutgers University Press. ISBN 9780813547688.
- Vincenzo Pietropaolo (2009). Harvest Pilgrims: Mexican and Caribbean Migrant Farm Workers in Canada. Between the Lines. ISBN 9781897071540.
- Vincenzo Pietropaolo; Preface by Nino Ricci (2006). Not Paved with Gold: Italian-Canadian Immigrants in The 1970s. Between the Lines. ISBN 9781897071083.
- Vincenzo Pietropaolo; Cecelia Elisabeth Burke Lawless (2002). Making Home in Havana. Rutgers University Press. ISBN 9780813530949.
- Vincenzo Pietropaolo (photographs), Introductory essay by Sam Gindin (2000). Canadians at Work / Canadiens au travail. Canadian Auto Workers.
- Vincenzo Pietropaolo; Text by Jean Cochrane (2000). Kensington. Boston Mills Press. ISBN 9781896357225.
- Vincenzo Pietropaolo; Introduction by Catherine MacLeod (1999). Celebration of resistance: Ontario's Days of Action. Between the Lines. ISBN 9781896357225.
- Satu Repo with Giuliana Colalillo and Vincenzo Pietropaolo (1978). Marco and Michela (Where We Live). James Lorimer & Company. ISBN 9780888621726.
