= Joan Payzant =

Canadian author (1925–2013)

Joan M. Payzant
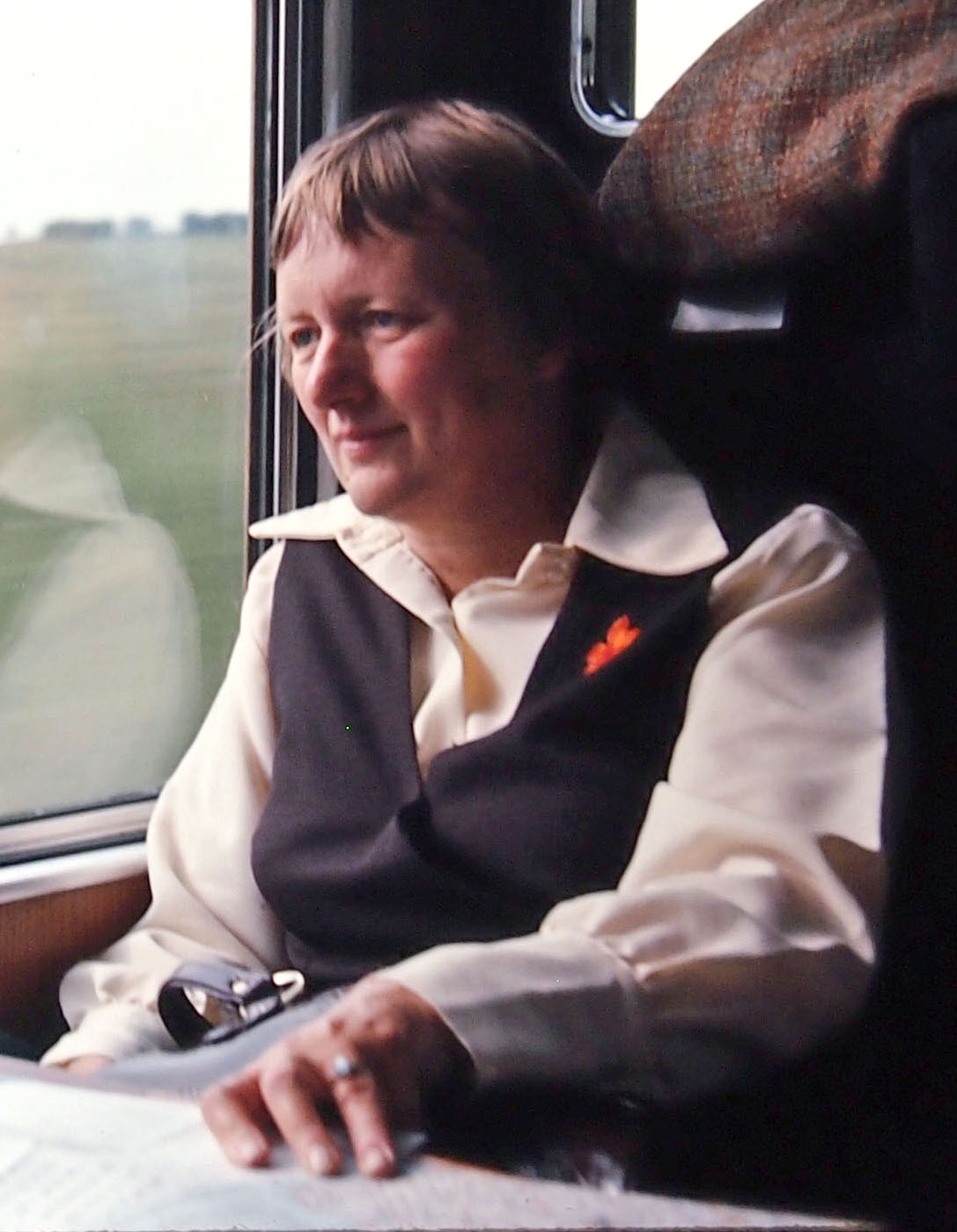
- Born: 4 February 1925; Dartmouth, Nova Scotia, Canada
- Died: 14 August 2013 (aged 88); Halifax, Nova Scotia
- Occupations: Author; schoolteacher

Joan Payzant (4 February 1925 – 14 August 2013) was a Canadian author most known for her historical fiction. She wrote about the history of Dartmouth and Halifax, Nova Scotia, Canada.

== Life ==
Payzant was born in Dartmouth, Nova Scotia, Canada on 4 February 1925. She graduated from Dalhousie University. She died in Halifax, Nova Scotia on 14 August 2013.

== Author ==
Her first major book (co-authored with her husband Lewis J. "Pete" Payzant) was about the ferry that connects Halifax and Dartmouth. She also wrote children's books including Who's a Scaredy-Cat! - A Story of the Halifax Explosion, which is a story surrounding two families in Dartmouth at the time of the Halifax explosion. After her idea for Scaredy-cat was rejected, Payzant stated that "I knew from having been a school librarian that it would be popular at the annual anniversary of the terrible Halifax disaster of 1917." As a result, she published this book herself to coincide with the 75th anniversary of the explosion in 1992. She hired an illustrator and printed 1500 copies of the book, which sold out in five months. By 1997 it was in its fourth printing and was added to the Nova Scotia Department of Education School Book Bureau list.

Payzant wrote biographies of her parents (Rob and Francie) and her husband (Pete). Both were privately printed.

== Columnist ==
Payzant was a columnist for the Dartmouth Free Press from 1979 to 1983. Over this period she wrote more than 200 articles on topics as diverse as travel, gardening, and Dartmouth history. These articles have been collected, edited by family members and privately printed, arriving from the printers on what would have been her 100th birthday (February 2025). Copies have been placed with the Dartmouth Heritage Museum and the Halifax Central Library.

== Awards ==
- Fellow of the Royal Nova Scotia Historical Society.
- Marianna Dempster Memorial Award (1993)
- Evelyn Richardson Memorial Literary Trust Award (1980)

== Selected works ==
- Crumbs (1976)
- Like a Weaver's Shuttle: A History of the Halifax-Dartmouth Ferries (1979). Co-authored with Lewis J. Payzant.
- Halifax: Cornerstone of Canada (1985)
- Atlantic Canada: At the Dawn of a New Nation. Co-authored with Shannon Ryan, Greg Marquis, and E. Boyd Beck.
- Who's a Scaredy-Cat!: A Story of the Halifax Explosion (1992)
- We Love to Ride the Ferry: 250 Years of Halifax-Dartmouth Ferry Crossings (2002)
- December 1917: Re-visiting the Halifax Explosion (2006). Co-authored with Janet Kitz.
- Every Wednesday - The Newspaper Columns of Joan Payzant (2025). Edited by Linda and Peter Payzant.
