= Satu Repo =

Canadian writer, educator, and sociology professor

- Citizenship: Canada
- Scientific career
- Fields: Sociology, Education, Politics

Satu Repo is a Canadian writer, educator, and sociology professor.

== Biography ==
Satu Repo is of Finnish-Canadian descent. She is the niece of Finnish journalist Eino S. Repo. Repo and George Martell raised three daughters: Identical twins Marya and Sylvia Duckworth and actress Liisa Repo-Martell, an award-winning Canadian actress.

In 1966 Repo, Martell, and Bob Davis founded "This Magazine Is About Schools". In its initial years, the magazine's articles were devoted to both education and politics. After several years the magazine changed its name to simply "This Magazine", and changed its focus to politics alone. It has been called "The most important source of early writing on Canadian alternative education."

In 1971, Repo edited a 457-page anthology of articles from the magazines first four years.

Repo and George Martell were among the founders of Everdale, a rural, residential "free school".

== Works ==
- Satu Repo; George Martell, eds. (1968). "This magazine is about schools, Volume 2". Everdale Place.
- Satu Repo (1998). Making Schools Matter: Good Teachers at Work. James Lorimer & Company. ISBN 9781550286243.
- Satu Repo (1978). What's A Friend?. James Lorimer & Company. ISBN 9780888621788.
- Satu Repo; Vincenzo Pietropaolo; Giuliana Colalillo (1985). Marco and Michela. James Lorimer & Company. ISBN 9780888621726.
- Satu Repo (1998). Making Schools Matter: Good Teachers at Work. James Lorimer & Company. ISBN 9781550286243.
- Satu Repo; Erika Shaker (2005). Teacher Surveillance: The New Panopticon. Canadian Centre for Policy Alternatives. ISBN 9780886275587.
- Satu Repo (1982). The Problem of Working Class Consciousness in Marxist Cultural Theory. University of Toronto.
- Satu Repo (2006). Our Schools, Our Selves. Canadian Centre for Policy Alternatives.
- Satu Repo; Erika Shaker (2002). Teaching about War and Peace. Canadian Centre for Policy Alternatives.
- Satu Repo; Erika Shaker (2002). After 9/11: A Conversation on Arab-Canadian Relations, Education, Identity. Canadian Centre for Policy Alternatives.
- Satu Repo; Erika Shaker (2002). The Parent Trap: Is Fund-raising Making Schools More Unequal?. Canadian Centre for Policy Alternatives.
- Satu Repo; Erika Shaker (2004). The Challenge of Global Education. Canadian Centre for Policy Alternatives.
- Satu Repo; Erika Shaker (2004). Standing Up to the New Right Assault at the Toronto. Canadian Centre for Policy Alternatives.
- Satu Repo (1984). Qu'est-ce qu'une amie?. Alliance des professeurs de Montreal. ISBN 9782980023910.
- Eric Newby; Satu Repo; Jarkko Aarniala (1986). Viimeinen kilpapurjehdus. Gummerus. ISBN 9789512027743.
- Satu Repo; Erika Shaker (2003). What is Anti-bias Education?. Canadian Centre for Policy Alternatives.
