= Jennifer Robertson (Quadriga) =

Canadian real estate developer (born 1988)

- Born: 1988 (age 37–38); Halifax, Nova Scotia, Canada
- Other names: Jennifer Kathleen Margaret Robertson; Jennifer Griffith; Jennifer Forgeron
- Occupation: Real estate developer
- Known for: Inherited an insolvent cryptocurrency exchange
- Spouse: Gerald Cotten (m. 2018; died 2018)

Jennifer Kathleen Margaret Robertson (born Jennifer Griffith, 1988) is a Canadian real estate developer, best known as the heir and widow of the CEO of the controversial QuadrigaCX cryptocurrency exchange.

Robertson and Gerald Cotten were in a relationship for several years, prior to their October 2018 marriage. In December 2018, they were on a trip to India to sponsor an orphanage when Cotten suffered severe intestinal distress related to his chronic Crohn's disease. Although he was given hospital care, his condition worsened, and, allegedly, he died less than a day after admission.

The India Times reported that limited funds had been made available to build the Jennifer Robertson and Gerald Cotten House; this claim proved to be false by the charity, Angel House and the orphanage was open and operational.

After Cotten's death, Robertson inherited millions of dollars in real estate holdings.

Approximately a month after Cotten's death Robertson informed shareholders that she had consulted computer security experts that the funds her husband had been managing were in "cold storage", and that his files did not contain encryption keys required to manage them.

In April 2019, Robertson voluntarily agreed not to sell or transfer any of her assets.

On October 8, 2019, Robertson returned $12 million CAD to Quadriga, from her husband's estate. Bloomberg News described this as a voluntary settlement. It listed the assets she was keeping, which included her wedding band, her personal vehicle, her personal retirement savings fund, and $90,000 cash.

Robertson said she was not involved in how her husband managed Quadriga, and had initially assumed her inheritance came from "legitimately earned profits, salary and dividends."

Robertson has written a book, Bitcoin Widow: Love, Betrayal and the Missing Millions, with Stephen Kimber, about her relationship with Cotten and the collapse of Quadriga. Bitcoin Widow was the No. 6 best-seller in non-fiction in Canada for the week ending 26 January 2022 and No 6 in Canadian non-fiction for the week ending 16 February 2022 in the Toronto Star, and No. 8 non-fiction in Canada, No. 3 Canadian non-fiction and No. 1 in Biography for the week ending 29 January 2022 in the Globe and Mail.
