= Kay Hill =

Canadian writer (1917–2011)

Kay Hill CM
- Born: Kathleen Louise Hill; 7 April 1917; Halifax, Nova Scotia, Canada
- Died: 14 March 2011 (aged 93); Halifax, Nova Scotia, Canada
- Occupation: Writer
- Notable work: Joe Howe: the Man who was Nova Scotia (1980)

Kathleen Louise Hill CM (7 April 1917 – 14 March 2011) was a Canadian author and playwright from Nova Scotia, known for her 13-part television series on Mi'kmaq legends. She was the author of over one hundred stage plays and radio dramas across her career. Her children's book Joe Howe: The Man who was Nova Scotia was the winner of the Evelyn Richardson Award at the Atlantic Book Awards in 1981. Hill was invested as a Member of the Order of Canada in 1999.

== Biography ==
Kay Hill was born on 7 April 1917 in Halifax, Nova Scotia, to parents Henry and Margaret Elizabeth Hill (née Ross). She attended Halifax County Academy for one year, where she earned a business diploma.

After graduating from Halifax County Academy, Hill began working as a freelance fiction writer. She did secretarial work while saving money to write full-time. After several years writing radio and television scripts, she was approached by the Halifax Canadian Broadcasting Corporation in August 1960 to create a pilot for a television series on Mi'kmaq legends. With the success of the pilot, she subsequently wrote the scripts for a 13-part series. The legends detailed in the series established the basis for her first book, Glooscap and his Magic, published in 1963.

Hill was the author of over one hundred stage plays and radio dramas. One of her most popular comedies was Cobbler, Stick to Thy Last, set in 1780s Cumberland County. Her three-part play Three to Get Married was broadcast on CBC Television in 1958.

In 1969, Hill was awarded the Book of the Year award by the Canadian Library Association for her children's book And Tomorrow The Stars. She received the Vicky Metcalf Award in 1971 from the Canadian Authors Association, and in 1981 her book Joe Howe: The Man who was Nova Scotia received the Evelyn Richardson Award at the Atlantic Book Awards. She was invested as a Member of the Order of Canada in 1999.

Hill lived in the historic Mackey House in Ketch Harbour. She made oil paintings in her spare time. She died in Halifax on 14 March 2011, at the age of 93.

== Publications ==
=== Books ===
- Hill, Kay (1963). Glooscap and his Magic: Legends of the Wabanaki Indians. Toronto: McClelland & Stewart. OCLC 25449610.
- — (1965). Badger, The Mischief Maker. New York: Dodd, Mead & Co. OCLC 8991656.
- — (1968). And Tomorrow the Stars: The Story of John Cabot. New York: Dodd, Mead & Co. OCLC 448721.
- — (1970). More Glooscap Stories: Legends of the Wabanaki Indians. New York: Dodd, Mead & Co. ISBN 978-0-7710-4090-0. OCLC 81436.
- — (1980). Joe Howe: The Man who was Nova Scotia. Toronto: McClelland & Stewart. ISBN 978-0-7710-4096-2. OCLC 6892735.

=== Plays ===
- Hill, Kay (1975). "Cobbler, Stick to Thy Last". In Stevens, John (ed.). Ten Canadian Short Plays. Toronto: Doubleday Canada. pp. 183–208. ISBN 0-4409-5754-0.
- — (1988). "Three to Get Married". In Heide, Christopher (ed.). Maritime Lines. Halifax, NS: Nimbus Publishing. pp. 148–154. ISBN 0-9210-5404-1.
