= Steven Laffoley =

Canadian author and educator (born 1965)

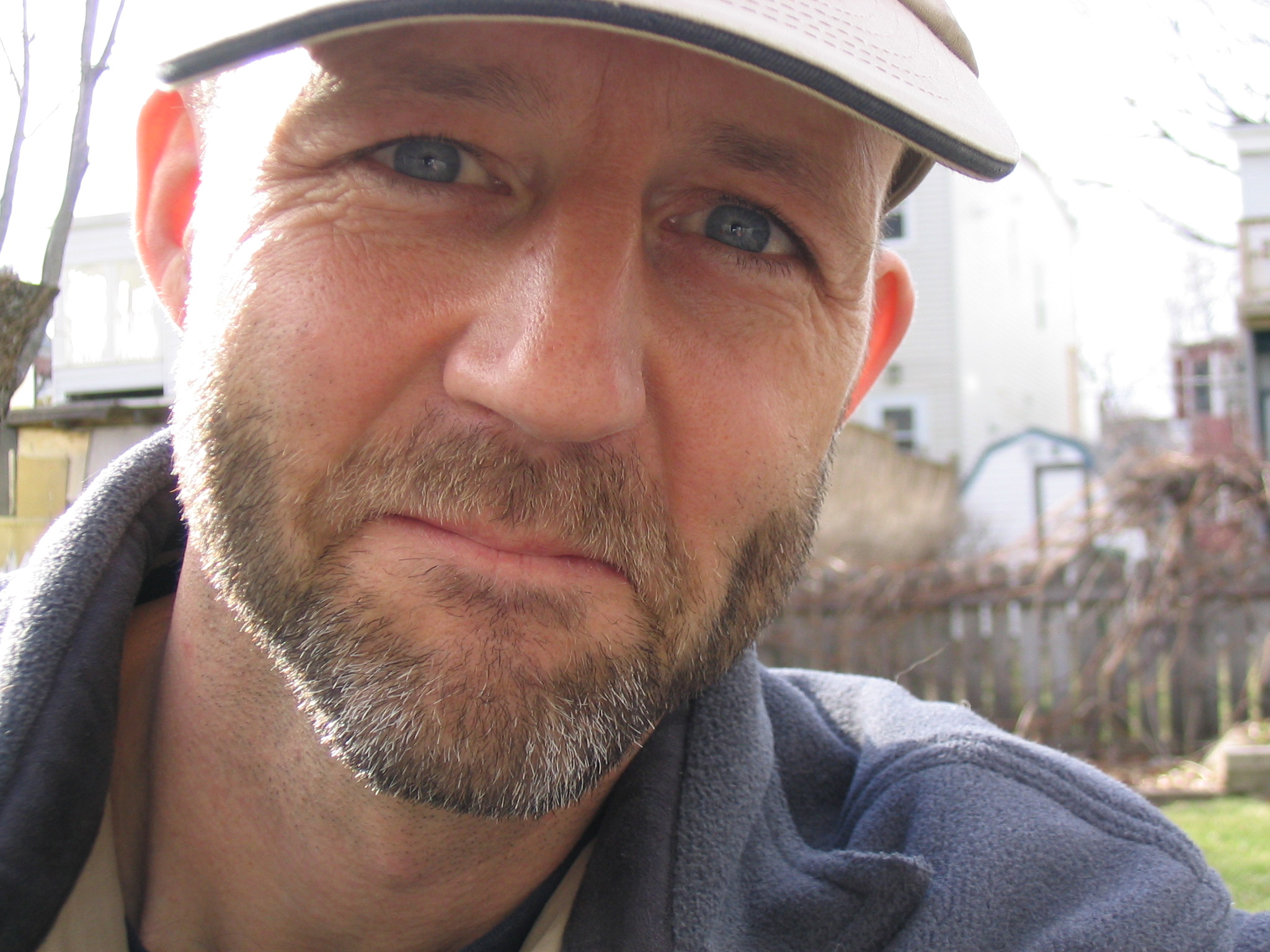
- Laffoley in 2012
- Born: 5 October 1965 (age 61); Taunton, Massachusetts, United States
- Occupation: Author
- Writing career
- Genres: Narrative Non-Fiction; Fiction
- Notable awards: Evelyn Richardson Memorial Non-Fiction Award (2013)

Steven Laffoley (born 5 October 1965) is a Canadian author and educator.

== Writing ==
Laffoley's Hunting Halifax was shortlisted for the 2008 Atlantic Independent Booksellers' Choice Award and the 2008 Evelyn Richardson Memorial Non-Fiction Award. Both The Devil And The Deep Blue Sea and Shadowboxing topped the Nova Scotia Bestsellers List, with the former being shortlisted for the 2012 Arthur Ellis Award for Best Crime Nonfiction and the latter winning the 2013 Evelyn Richardson Nonfiction Award. Of his novel The Blue Tattoo, Atlantic Books Today wrote "It's a big story that everyone should read ... It deepens one's appreciation for the parts of the city touched by the devastation of December 6, 1917".

== Critical response ==
Critic Thomas Hodd from the Telegraph-Journal wrote that Laffoley injects "first person, post-modern narrative as he recounts his investigative process and offers reflections on the facts as they reveal themselves". Another critic from The Coast praised the way in which he weaves together "the main story" and "contemporaneous scenes" in his books that make for "intriguing context".

When asked about the inspiration behind his book Shadowboxing, Laffoley said he was fascinated with the fact that George Dixon, who seemed so influential in the boxing and wider communities of Canada and the United States, had not yet had a biography written. According to a review by Jenna Conter, Laffoley is the "Stephen King of Halifax" because his unique writing style gives his works a cinematic quality, both vivid and imaginative.

== Biography ==
Born in Taunton, Massachusetts and raised in Bridgewater, Massachusetts, Steven attended Saint Mary's University. For nineteen years, Laffoley was the head of Middle School at the Halifax Grammar School, a position he held since establishing the middle school in September 1997. In July 2016, he was appointed the thirteenth Head of School of the Halifax Grammar School. He is of English, Irish, Scandinavian, and Ashkenazi Jewish descent.

== Awards and acknowledgements ==
- Winner of the 2013 Evelyn Richardson Memorial Non-Fiction Award (Shadowboxing)
- Shortlisted Crime Writers of Canada Awards of Excellence 2012 – Best Crime Nonfiction (The Devil and the Deep Blue Sea)
- Finalist for the 2008 Evelyn Richardson Memorial Non-Fiction Award (Hunting Halifax)

== Bibliography ==
=== Novels ===
- The Blue Tattoo (2014)
- A Halifax Christmas Carol (2017)
- Halifax Nocturne (2019)

=== Nonfiction ===
- Mr. Bush, Angus and Me: Notes Of An American-Canadian In The Age Of Unreason (2005)
- Hunting Halifax: In Search of History, Mystery and Murder (2007)
- Death Ship of Halifax Harbor (2009)
- The Devil And The Deep Blue Sea (2011)
- Shadowboxing: The Rise and Fall of George Dixon (2012, second edition 2022)
- Pulling No Punches: The Sam Langford Story (2013)
- The Halifax Poor House Fire: A Victorian Tragedy (2016)
- Mean Streets: In Search of Forgotten Halifax, 1953-1967 (2020)
- Unfiltered: An Irreverent History of Beer in Nova Scotia (2021)
- Dulse to Donairs: An Irreverent History of Food in Nova Scotia (2022)
- What's the Point? An Irreverent Guide to Point Pleasant Park (2024)
- Lost in the Right Direction: Discovering North End Halifax (2026)

=== Other works ===
- "Of Taverns and Tomorrows" in Nova Scotia: Visions of the Future, edited by Lesley Choyce (2009)
- "The Only Way Home" in Nova Scotia Love Stories, edited by Lesley Choyce (2015)
- "George Dixon" in The Top 15: Nova Scotia's Greatest Athletes, edited by Nova Scotia Sports Hall of Fame (2018)
- "Christmas Spirit" in Down Home For Christmas, edited by Lesley Choyce and Julia Swan (2021)
- "The Only Way Home" in High Water Mark: Stories from Atlantic Canada 1983-2023, edited by Lesley Choyce (2023)
- "Introduction" in Ruby Johnson by Bruce Graham (2026)
