= Stephen Kimber =

Canadian journalist, editor, broadcaster and instructor

Stephen Edward Kimber ONS (born August 25, 1949) is a Canadian journalist, editor and broadcaster and instructor at the University of King's College in Halifax, Nova Scotia.

== Early life and education ==
Kimber was born in Halifax, Nova Scotia. He attended Dalhousie University from 1967 to 1970, where he served as editor of the Dalhousie Gazette. He earned his Master of Fine Arts in Creative Nonfiction from Goucher College in Baltimore in 2001.

== Career ==
From 1985 to 2002, he was the weekly political and general columnist for The Daily News in Halifax. Later, he served as a weekly political and public affairs columnist for Halifax Metro and the Halifax Examiner, and was a Contributing Editor for Atlantic Business Magazine. His writing has appeared in many major Canadian newspapers and magazines. As an Ottawa-based broadcaster, he was a current affairs producer on CTV Television Network and a producer, story editor, writer and host for many CBC Television and radio programs.

He has been a professor at the University of King's College from 1983 to his retirement in 2025 and has been the director of the School of Journalism three times. In 2013, he co-founded the university's Master of Fine Arts in Creative Nonfiction program.

== Honours ==
Kimber received an honorable mention from the Centre for Investigative Journalism that he shared with Kelly Shiers for an article in Cities Magazine about the botched search for a little boy lost in the woods of Nova Scotia.

He won the 2022 Evelyn Richardson Award for his book Alexa!: Changing the Face of Canadian Politics.

In 2023, he was appointed a member of the Order of Nova Scotia for representing Nova Scotia in the national press and mentoring several generations of journalists.

In 2026, he was honoured with a Legacy Award from the Atlantic Book Awards Society, which is presented to individuals who have made "a lasting contribution to the development of the literary arts in Atlantic Canada, people who have gone above and beyond the call of duty and who have, through innovation, risk-taking, self-sacrifice, and/or creativity, provided opportunity or inspiration (or both) for those sharing Atlantic Canadian stories through writing and publishing."

In June 2026, he was inducted into the Atlantic Journalism Awards Hall of Fame "in recognition of his outstanding and lasting contributions to journalism."

== Books ==
- Net Profits (Nimbus, 1990)
- The Spirit of Africville (co-author) (Formac, 1992)
- More Than Just Folks (Pottersfield, 1996)
- Flight 111: The Tragedy of the Swissair Crash (Doubleday, 1999/ Nimbus 2013)
- NOT GUILTY: The Trial of Gerald Regan (Stoddart, 1999)
  - Aphrodisiac: Sex, Politics, Power and Gerald Regan (Expanded and updated ebook edition, 2016)
- Sailors, Slackers and Blind Pigs: Halifax at War (Doubleday, September 2002);
  - Winner, Richardson Award (2003)
  - Winner, Dartmouth Book Award for Nonfiction (2003)
  - Torgi Award, CNIB Nonfiction Audio Book Award (2004)
  - Finalist, Atlantic Booksellers Award (2003)
- Reparations: A Novel (HarperCollins 2006)
  - Finalist, Dartmouth Book Award for Fiction (2006)
  - Finalist Arthur Ellis Crime Writers of Canada First Novel Award
- Loyalists and Layabouts: The Rapid Rise and Faster Fall of Shelburne, NS 1783-1792 (Doubleday 2008);
  - Finalist, Richardson Award (2008)
  - Finalist, Dartmouth Book Award for Nonfiction
- IWK: A Century of Caring (Nimbus, 2009)
- Halifax: Warden of the North (co-author, updated edition) (Nimbus 2010)
- What Lies Across the Water: The Real Story of the Cuban Five (Fernwood, 2013)
  - Winner, Richardson Award (2014)
  - Long-listed, Libris Award for Best Canadian Nonfiction Book (2014)
  - Readers Choice Award, Cuban Institute of the Book (Spanish edition, 2016)
- The Sweetness in the Lime (Nimbus, 2020)
- Alexa!: Changing the Face of Canadian Politics (Goose Lane, 2021)
  - Winner Richardson Award (2022)
- Bitcoin Widow: Love, Betrayal and the Missing Millions (Jennifer Robertson with Stephen Kimber) (HarperCollins Canada, 2022)
- The Phelan Feud: The Bitter Struggle for Control of a Great Canadian Food Empire (Barlow Books, 2024)
- Traitor's Game: A Mick Blackwell Mystery (Nimbus, 2026)
