= Michael Patryn =

Canadian entrepreneur and felon

- Born: Omar Dhanani
- Other names: Sifu, 0xSifu, Omar Patryn
- Criminal charges: Conspiracy to commit credit card fraud

Michael Patryn (born Omar Dhanani) is an internet entrepreneur. He is best known for being the co-founder of Quadriga Fintech Solutions.

== History ==
In 2007 Patryn admitted to conspiring in separate criminal cases for burglary, grand larceny, and computer fraud. He was arrested as a part of a sting operation on ShadowCrew by the Secret Service. Patryn had not been using a proxy address, allowing authorities to identify him with the assistance of a confidential informant within the group.

After serving time in a U.S. prison, he was subsequently deported to Canada, where he changed his name twice, once to Omar Patryn, before changing it back to Michael Patryn. He publicly denied that the two identities are related, but an investigation by the Globe and Mail confirmed the name changes with the Canadian government.

== Quadriga Fintech Solutions ==
Patryn co-founded Quadriga Fintech Solutions, operator of the crypto exchange QuadrigaCX, with Gerald Cotten. He claims he left the company in 2016, before the company allegedly became a Ponzi scheme resulting in over $200 million in losses after Cotten died.

The Ontario Securities Commission claimed they attempted to contact Patryn during their investigation, but he did not respond. They believe that the majority of the funds were deposited after his believed departure.

== Wonderland ==
In January 2022, Patryn was allegedly revealed to be 0xSifu, an anonymous individual who co-founded and was elected to manage the treasury at the DeFi cryptocurrency Wonderland, one of the most popular projects in 2021. When this happened, demands resulted in him resigning from the position as many erroneously assumed him to be Cotten when doxxed simply as "the quadriga guy". In February 2022, Wonderland asked him to return with an informal vote in favor. In September 2022, Wonderland voted to hire him as their Risk Officer in a vote which passed with ~90% approval.

At its peak, Patryn oversaw over $1 billion in assets in the Wonderland treasury. The incident has led many to advocate for the de-anonymization of crypto.
