= Douglas How =

Canadian journalist, magazine editor, and author (1919–2001)

Douglas George How (1919–2001) was a Canadian journalist, magazine editor, and author.

He was born in Winnipeg, Manitoba, but after his father's death, the family returned to Dorchester, New Brunswick, where his mother was born and where Douglas grew up. At the age of 18, he became a reporter for the Moncton Daily Times and in 1940, he joined the Canadian Press service in Halifax, sending dispatches across the country with the dateline "from an East Coast Canadian Port" to suit the censors at the start of World War II. He enlisted with the Cape Breton Highlanders and was posted to Surrey, England in 1942. In 1943, he was reposted to London to work in public relations for the army. Finding this work unrewarding, he rejoined CP as a war correspondent and for the rest of the war, he reported on Canadian troops in England and Europe, following the Canadian push through Italy and Greece.

He moved to Ottawa when the war ended and served as a reporter in the Parliamentary Press Gallery for CP between 1945 and 1953. He then worked briefly as a freelance writer in Nova Scotia, and between 1955 and 1957, he was the executive assistant to the Nova Scotia Member of Parliament Robert Winters while Winters was federal Minister of Public Works. He then joined the staff of Time magazine, working on assignments in Toronto, Ottawa, and New York. In 1959, he accepted a position as managing editor for the Canadian edition of Reader's Digest, which he held for the next decade.

How is the author of several books, including the regimental history of the 8th Canadian Hussars (1964), Canada's Mystery Man of High Finance, about Izaak Walton Killam, and KC (co-authored with Ralph Costello), a biography of New Brunswick industrialist K. C. Irving.

Late in his life, he obtained a long-coveted degree in arts from Mount Allison University. He served as the director of the university extension services for some time before moving to St. Andrews, New Brunswick, where he completed several books. At age 83, he succumbed to heart failure in July 2001.

== Publications ==
- The 8th Hussars: A History of the Regiment (1964) Maritime Publishing
- The Canadians at War 1939-45 (3 volumes), (1969, editor-in-chief) Montreal: Reader’s Digest
- Canada's Mystery Man of High Finance: the story of Izaak Walton Killam and his glittering wife Dorothy (1986) Hantsport: Lancelot Press.
- Night of the Caribou (1988) Hantsport: Lancelot Press
- K.C. : the biography of K.C. Irving (1993, with Ralph Costello) Toronto: Key Porter Books
- Blow Up the Trumpet in the New Moon (1993) Toronto: Oberon Press
- One Village One War (1995) Hantsport: Lancelot Press

== References and further reading ==
- Douglas How fonds, York University Libraries Clara Thomas Archives and Special Collections
- Douglas How Fonds, New Brunswick Archives
