= Hannah McGregor =

Canadian academic, writer, and podcaster

- Born: 1984 (age 41–42); Ottawa, Canada

Academic background
- Education: University of Guelph (BHum, MA, PhD)
- Thesis: Complicit Witnessing: Distant Suffering in Contemporary White Canadian Women’s Writing (2013)
- Doctoral advisor: Smaro Kamboureli
- Website: hannahmcgregor.com

Hannah McGregor (born 1984, in Ottawa) is a Canadian academic, writer, and podcaster. With Marcelle Kosman, they (Note: McGregor uses she/they pronouns. For consistency, this article uses they/them throughout.) co-host the podcasts Material Girls and Witch, Please. They also host Secret Feminist Agenda and are involved with the SpokenWeb podcast.

After graduating from Canterbury High School, McGregor earned a Bachelor of Humanities from Carleton University, a Master of Arts in English and Film Studies from the University of Alberta, and a Doctor of Philosophy from the University of Guelph (2013). As of 2024, they work at Simon Fraser University as an associate professor and director of publishing.

== Books ==
=== As author ===
- McGregor, Hannah (2022). A Sentimental Education. Wilfrid Laurier University. ISBN 978-1-77112-557-4.
- Beckstead, Lori; Cook, Ian M.; McGregor, Hannah (2024). Podcast or Perish: Peer Review and Knowledge Creation for the 21st Century. Bloomsbury podcast studies. New York: Bloomsbury Academic. ISBN 978-1-5013-8521-6.
- McGregor, Hannah (2024). Clever Girl: Jurassic Park. ECW Press. ISBN 978-1-778-52284-0.

=== As editor ===
- McGregor, Hannah; Rak, Julie; Wunker, Erin, eds. (2018). Refuse: CanLit in Ruins. Toronto: Book*hug. ISBN 978-1-77166-431-8.

== Podcasts ==
- Witch, Please (2015-present), cohosted with Marcelle Kosman
- Secret Feminist Agenda (2017-present)
- The SpokenWeb Podcast (2018-present)
- Material Girls, cohosted with Marcelle Kosman
