= Worthy of Love =

2019 young adult novel by Andre Fenton

- First edition
- Author: Andre Fenton
- Language: English
- Genre: young adult coming-of-age
- Publisher: Formac Publishing Company
- Publication date: 2019
- Publication place: Canada
- ISBN: 9781459505483 (paperback edition)
- OCLC: 1080210688

Worthy of Love is a 2019 Canadian young adult coming-of-age novel by Andre Fenton, which follows the story of mixed-race Nova Scotian teenager Adrian Carter, a boy who has an eating disorder. The book received generally positive reviews from critics, and was commended for featuring taboo subject matter of eating disorders in men. Worthy of Love won Bronze in The Coast Best Of, a Nova Scotian annual contest.

== Background ==
Worthy of Love is authored by Andre Fenton. When he was in high school, he began developing the novel. In college, he moved to drafting the book. Born in 1994 or 1995, Fenton drew on his adolescent years spent in Halifax, Nova Scotia, for the novel.

== Plot ==
Adrian is morbidly obese, weighing 280 pounds. He tries to minimize his bulky appearance by wearing black clothing, which does little to boost his self-esteem, particularly in school. A resident of Halifax, Nova Scotia, Adrian attends a local school where he is embarrassed during a weigh-in in gym class; compared to his peers, Adrian is extremely overweight, and his coach, who calls Adrian's bullying "petty crap", does not prevent any of the fatphobic comments that come Adrian's way. Tired of the harassment, Adrian sets a goal to lose as much weight as possible, which leads him to experiment with self-induced vomiting until he develops a habit of full-blown bulimia. He secretly binge-eats at home, and dreads the idea that a girl he is attracted to, Melody Woods (affectionately nicknamed "Mel") will never love him because he is fat and ugly. These internalized feelings only heighten his emerging eating disorder. Adrian is, however, able to find solace in a local kickboxing class in Halifax, and this is where he is able to exercise in a healthy way. Mel confronts Adrian about his weight loss and apparent eating problems, leading Adrian to question his own negative self-perception and how it all started.

== Reception ==
Worthy of Love received mostly positive reviews from critics, owing in part to its uniquely Canadian perspective on eating disorders (with many teen fiction novels on eating disorders being published in the United States with no Canadian culture), and also in part due to its addressing of males who have eating disorders. Kirkus Reviews said of the book, "Adrian is a highly sympathetic protagonist, showing sensitivity and emotional maturity that would outshine that of many adults. Accessible and engaging, full of honest feeling", although it also criticized the racial dynamics in the book; the bullies are all white, while main characters Adrian and Mel are biracial. Kristie Gadson, an American reviewer for Philadelphia-based Cleaver Magazine, viewed the book positively, stating, "candid, earnest, and full of emotion, Fenton gives us a unique yet personal story about one journey toward self-love."

In a mixed review, Patricia Jermey wrote in the Society for Canadian Educational Resources' Resource Links wrote, "It is refreshing to see body image presented from a male point of view. But the writing is uneven, too often repetitive and pedantic. Parents are non-entities, school and teachers only there to provide a context for bullying, some plotting is unrealistic and minor characters are cardboard stereotypes."

== See also ==
- Literature of Nova Scotia
