= Erin Wunker =

Canadian feminist theorist

Erin Wunker is a Canadian feminist theorist and literary scholar whose book Notes from A Feminist Killjoy won the Evelyn Richardson Award at the Atlantic Book Awards in 2017. She is an assistant professor and department chair at Dalhousie University.

== Education and career ==
Wunker holds a Bachelor of Arts from the University of North Carolina at Chapel Hill, a Master of Arts from McGill University, and a PhD from the University of Calgary. She is the department chair at Dalhousie University's department of English, where she also works as an assistant professor.

In 2017, Wunker's book Notes From a Feminist Killjoy won the Evelyn Richardson Award and the Margaret and John Savage First Book Award, and was shortlisted for the Atlantic Book Award for Scholarly Writing.

== Publications ==
=== Books as author ===
- Wunker, Erin (2016). Notes From a Feminist Killjoy: Essays on Everyday Life. Toronto: Book*hug Press. ISBN 978-1-7716-6256-7.
- Wunker, Erin (2020). The Routledge Introduction to Twentieth- and Twenty-First-Century Canadian Poetry. New York: Routledge. doi:10.4324/9780429352966. ISBN 978-0-3673-7166-1.

=== Books as editor ===
- Vautour, Bart; Wunker, Erin; Mason, Travis V.; Verduyn, Christl, eds. (2015). Public Poetics: Critical Issues in Canadian Poetry and Poetics. Waterloo, ON: Wilfrid Laurier University Press. ISBN 978-1-7711-2047-0.
- Queyras, Sina (2016). Wunker, Erin (ed.). Barking and Biting: The Poetry of Sina Queyras. Waterloo, ON: Wilfrid Laurier University Press. ISBN 978-1-7711-2216-0.
- McGregor, Hannah; Rak, Julie; Wunker, Erin, eds. (2018). Refuse: CanLit in Ruins. Toronto: Book*hug Press. ISBN 978-1-7716-6431-8.
- Brossard, Nicole (2020). Queyras, Sina; Robichaud, Genevieve; Wunker, Erin (eds.). Avant Desire: A Nicole Brossard Reader. Toronto: Coach House Books. ISBN 978-1-5524-5403-9.
