= Alan Gordon (cricketer) =

English cricketer (1944–2007)

Alan Gordon (29 March 1944 – 15 March 2007) was an English cricketer who played first-class and List A cricket for Warwickshire between 1966 and 1971. He was born and died at Coventry, England.

Gordon was a right-handed middle-order batsman who made a lot of runs for Warwickshire's second eleven in both the Minor Counties and the Second Eleven Championship but was never able to establish himself in the first team which, in the later part of his career, was dominated by Test players and overseas stars. He played in a few first-class matches each season from 1966 to 1971 but only in 1970 did he meet with any success, and his 65 against Surrey that season was the top score of the first innings in a match that ended with the scores level and the top score of his career. His club cricket was for Coventry and North Warwickshire Cricket Club and after leaving Warwickshire in 1971 he ran a pub at Exhall for 20 years.
