= Alan Gordon (historian) =

Canadian historian (born 1968)

- Born: 1968; Scotland
- Died: July 25, 2022 (aged 53–54)
- Citizenship: Canadian

Academic background
- Education: University of Toronto; Queen's University
- Doctoral advisor: Ian McKay

Academic work
- Discipline: History
- Institutions: University of Guelph

Alan Gordon (born 1968) was a Scottish-born Canadian historian at the University of Guelph. He studied at the University of Toronto, and at Queen's University, where he completed his PhD under the supervision of Ian McKay. He taught at a number of universities in Ontario before joining the University of Guelph in 2003. His research focused on history, historiography, and collective memory. Prior to his passing, Gordon was working on living history museums. He was active in the Tri-University graduate program, combining MA and PhD studies at the University of Guelph, Wilfrid Laurier University, and the University of Waterloo.

He was the founding editor of H-Canada, part of the H-Net network of academic discussion groups. Under his editorship, H-Canada grew to become the premier forum for academic historians to discuss Canadian history. He resigned as editor in 2004. From 2007 to 2017 he was the editor in chief of the Urban History Review, a bilingual academic journal devoted to urban history. He was also the editor of the Journal of Canadian Studies. Gordon died from pancreatic cancer on July 25, 2022.
