= John DeMont =

Canadian writer and journalist

John DeMont is a Canadian writer and journalist from Nova Scotia. Born in Halifax, DeMont has written for several publications in Canada and works as a columnist and senior editor for The Chronicle Herald. His books have twice won the Evelyn Richardson Memorial Non-Fiction Award at the Atlantic Book Awards: in 2010 for Coal Black Heart and in 2018 for The Long Way Home.

== Biography ==
DeMont was born in Halifax, Nova Scotia. As a journalist, he has written for several publications in Canada such as PNI Atlantic News, Canadian Geographic, and The Walrus. DeMont spent 10 years working at Maclean's as the Atlantic bureau chief, and works as a columnist and senior editor for The Chronicle Herald, a Halifax-based newspaper.

In his 1998 book The Last Best Place, DeMont recounts his travels outside of Nova Scotia and the ways in which the province had changed in his long absence.

DeMont's 2009 book Coal Black Heart covers the history of coal mining in Nova Scotia, particularly in Cape Breton. The book was the winner of the Evelyn Richardson Memorial Non-Fiction Award at the 2010 Atlantic Book Awards.

In 2013, DeMont released A Good Day's Work, a book covering traditional jobs in Canada such as lighthouse keepers and milkmen. DeMont's ancestors were variously coal miners and steelworkers, including his grandfather who began working in the coal mines at the age of 11. DeMont described his family history in traditional labour jobs as the inspiration for the book.

His 2017 book, The Little Tree By the Sea, is a children's picture book about the Halifax Explosion and the associated tradition of the Boston Christmas Tree. The book was written with his daughter, Belle DeMont.

DeMont released his memoir, The Long Way Home, in 2017. The book explores DeMont's life as a journalist and his historical connections to Nova Scotia. The book was well-received by critics, being listed among five "must-read books for October" by Maclean's in 2017. The book was the winner of the Evelyn Richardson Memorial Non-Fiction Award at the 2018 Atlantic Book Awards.

== Publications ==
=== Books ===
- — (1989). Hong Kong Money: How Chinese Families and Fortunes are Changing Canada. Toronto, ON: Key Porter Books. ISBN 978-1-5501-3164-2. OCLC 22863151.
- — (1991). Citizens Irving: K.C. Irving and His Legacy. Toronto, ON: McClelland & Stewart. ISBN 978-0-7710-2614-0.
- — (1998). The Last Best Place: Lost In The Heart Of Nova Scotia. Toronto, ON: Doubleday Canada. ISBN 978-0-3852-5604-9. OCLC 36838633.
- — (2009). Coal Black Heart: The Story of Coal and Lives it Ruled. Toronto, ON: Doubleday Canada. ISBN 978-0-3856-6504-9. OCLC 275842251.
- — (2013). A Good Day's Work: In Pursuit of a Disappearing Canada. Toronto, ON: Doubleday Canada. ISBN 978-0-3856-6506-3. OCLC 843520534.
- —; DeMont, Belle (2017). The Little Tree By the Sea: To Boston With Love. Lunenburg, NS: MacIntyre Purcell Publishing. ISBN 978-1-7727-6069-9. OCLC 975051782.
- — (2017). The Long Way Home: A Personal History of Nova Scotia. Toronto, ON: McClelland & Stewart. ISBN 978-0-7710-2511-2. OCLC 1011916359.

=== Selected articles ===
- — (10 November 2022). "Discovering my grandfather's war". PNI Atlantic News. Postmedia Network.

== Recognition ==
- 2010 Evelyn Richardson Memorial Non-Fiction Award for Coal Black Heart
- 2018 Evelyn Richardson Memorial Non-Fiction Award for The Long Way Home
