= Halifax Grammar School =

Coordinates: 44°37′57.2″N 63°34′39.6″W

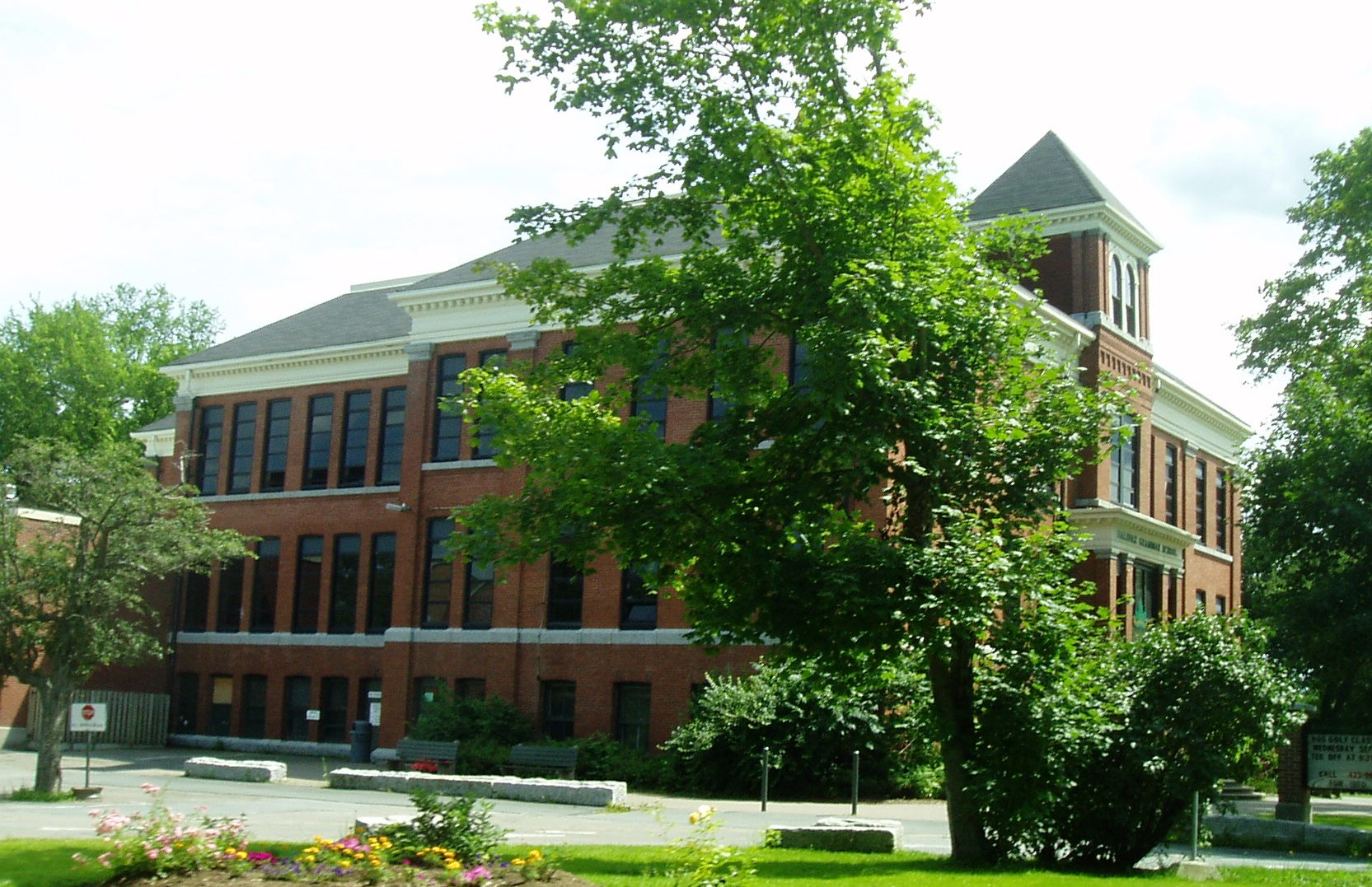

Location
- 945 Tower Road; Halifax, Nova Scotia, B3H 2Y2; Canada

Information
- Type: Private Co-educational
- Motto: Inito ad discendum, Exito ad serviendum (Enter to learn, Exit to serve)
- Established: 1958
- Head of school: Steven Laffoley
- Grades: JP–12
- Enrollment: 600
- Mascot: Grammar Gryphon
- Team name: Gryphons
- Yearbook: The Grammarian
- Website: www.halifaxgrammar.ca

The Halifax Grammar School (Grammar) is an independent, educational day school in Halifax, Nova Scotia, Canada. It is located in south-end Halifax, near Saint Mary's University. Since 2016, the Head of School is Steven Laffoley.

== Admission ==
The school is a tuition-based academic institution, with an admission fee to enrol a new student and other, additional costs.

== Arts ==
The school's arts program includes visual arts, film, drama, design, media arts, and music/band. At the High School level, students have the option of taking IB Standard Level Art.

== Notable alumni ==
- Howard Epstein – Nova Scotia Politician
- Russell Smith - novelist
- Jay Ferguson - musician, member of Sloan
- Noah Pink - screenwriter, television producer, director, and swimmer
- Elliot Page - actor
- David Goldbloom - psychiatrist
- Bill Black (businessman)
- Steven Laffoley - Educator, Author
