= Shattered City: The Halifax Explosion and the Road to Recovery =

1989 non-fiction book by Janet Kitz

Shattered City
- Cover of the first edition
- Author: Janet Kitz
- Language: English
- Subject: Canadian history
- Publisher: Nimbus Publishing
- Publication date: 1989
- Publication place: Canada
- Media type: Print (hardcover · paperback)
- Pages: 212
- ISBN: 0-921054-30-0

Shattered City: The Halifax Explosion and the Road to Recovery is a 1989 Canadian non-fiction book by Janet Kitz describing the experience of the Halifax Explosion with an emphasis on the experience of ordinary people and families who became victims or survivors of the 1917 munitions explosion in Halifax, Nova Scotia. The book broke new ground, making extensive use of oral history interviews conducted by Janet Kitz to tell previously unknown stories from the event, illustrated by documents and photographs collected by the author as well as images and artifacts from the Maritime Museum of the Atlantic. The first book published in many years about the explosion, it broke the record for the largest number of books ever sold at a book launch in Nova Scotia and has been credited as creating a renaissance in published accounts about the 1917 disaster. The book has been reprinted several times and has remained a definitive account of the disaster which has influenced numerous works that have followed. Janet Kitz went on to write two follow-up books: Survivors: Children of the Halifax Explosion (2000) which explored in more detail the stories of children who survived and December 1917: Revisiting the Halifax Explosion (2006) with Joan Payzant which looked at the impact of the explosion on the landscape of Halifax and Dartmouth.

A CBC television miniseries in 2003 Shattered City: The Halifax Explosion took the same title of the book, but the miniseries had no connection to the book or its author.

== Editions ==
- 1989 1st Edition (Nimbus): ISBN 0-921054-30-0
- 2004 2nd Edition (Nimbus): ISBN 1-55109-490-8
- 2008 3rd Edition (Nimbus): ISBN 1-55109-670-6

== See also ==
- Literature of Nova Scotia
