= Janet Kitz =

Canadian author (1930–2019)

Janet Frame Kitz ONS MSM
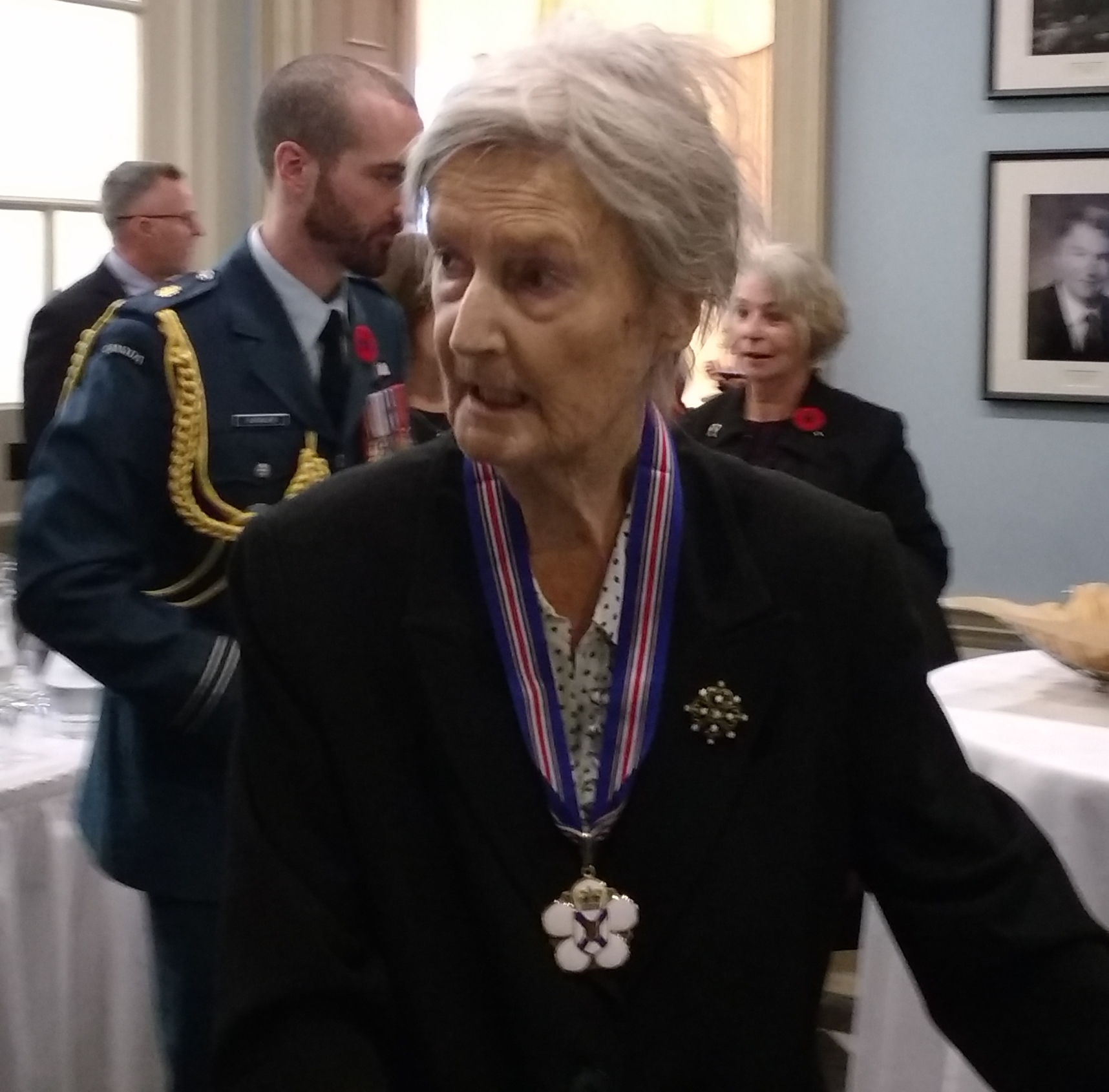
- Janet Kitz, 2018
- Born: January 12, 1930; Carnwath, South Lanarkshire, Scotland
- Died: May 10, 2019 (aged 89); Halifax, Nova Scotia, Canada
- Education: Lanark Grammar School and Jordanhill College, Glasgow
- Occupations: Educator, Historian, Writer
- Spouse: Leonard Arthur Kitz
- Writing career
- Period: 1989–2006
- Genres: Canadian history, Nova Scotia History
- Notable works: Shattered City: The Halifax Explosion and the Road to Recovery; Survivors: Children of the Halifax Explosion; 1917: Revisiting the Halifax Explosion; A History of Point Pleasant Park; Andrew Cobb: Architect and Artist

Janet F. Kitz ONS MSM (January 12, 1930 – May 10, 2019) was a Scottish-born Canadian educator, author and historian based in Halifax, Nova Scotia.

She played a key role in the recognition of the 1917 Halifax Explosion, the largest man-made explosion prior to the atomic bomb and the worst man-made disaster in Canadian history.

== Early life ==
Janet Frame Kitz, (née Brownlee) was born in Carnwath, South Lanarkshire, Scotland in 1930, daughter of Elizabeth (née Rankin) and Thomas Brownlee, a noted horticulturalist. She attended school at Lanark Grammar School and earned a Teaching Certificate from Jordanhill College in Glasgow.

== Educational career ==
Kitz worked in education for 20 years, teaching first in London, then Davos, Switzerland, and then in Maryland, United States. She also worked as a British Red Cross Welfare Officer in Davos.

Kitz was teaching in Edinburgh, Scotland when she attended an event at the Edinburgh International Festival where she met Leonard Arthur Kitz a lawyer and former mayor from Halifax, Nova Scotia. They married in 1971 and Kitz emigrated to Nova Scotia.

== Halifax explosion ==
=== Museum work ===
Kitz had not heard of the Halifax explosion before she moved to Halifax. However, while taking anthropology courses at Saint Mary's University, Kitz grew interested in the disaster and its effects on the people of Halifax. The 1917 munitions explosion killed nearly 2,000 people but was little known outside of Halifax. Only two books had been written about the event in the 70 years since the explosion and the only commemoration was a library in the North End of Halifax.

After writing a paper about the explosion, Kitz was hired by the Nova Scotia Museum to assist the Maritime Museum of the Atlantic catalogue thousands of objects in the mortuary collection of objects from victims of the explosion which had been discovered in the basement of the provincial legislature. This led to a temporary exhibit at the Maritime Museum of the Atlantic called "A Moment in Time" in 1987. The exhibit was subsequently expanded in 1994 and became a permanent exhibit, curated by Kitz and called "Halifax Wrecked".

Kitz interviewed survivors of the explosion and their families, a process which evolved to become an ongoing oral history project with explosion survivors and their families.

=== Books ===
Kitz's work at the museum led her to write the 1989 book Shattered City: The Halifax Explosion and the Road to Recovery. The book combined artifact research, oral history and documentary history to explore the explosion through the families involved. It has remained a definitive account which has influenced numerous works published since. Kitz followed this book with Survivors: Children of the Halifax Explosion and December 1917: Revisiting the Halifax Explosion co-written with Dartmouth historian Joan Payzant in 2006.

=== Public commemorations ===
Kitz was a founding member of the Halifax Explosion Memorial Bells Committee which created a monument to the disaster in 1985 at Fort Needham Park overlooking the site of disaster. As part of this work, Kitz organized a reunion of survivors at the monument which became an annual event. Kitz chaired the committee that marked the 75th anniversary of the explosion in 1992 with an academic conference and a scholarly book Ground Zero. She worked with the families of sailors from the ship SS Curaca, sunk during the explosion, to have their names inscribed on a monument in Halifax's Fairview Cemetery in 2001. In 2002, she led research with former mayor Edmund Morris and the Halifax Foundation in 2002 to create a definitive list of the victims of the explosion called "The Book of Remembrance of the Halifax Explosion" presented in a detailed online database at the Nova Scotia Archives.

== Other works ==
Kitz served as a board member on the Society for the Prevention of Cruelty to Animals in Halifax, the Women's Auxiliary of the Isaac Walton Killam Hospital for Children and as chair of the Point Pleasant Park Commission. In 1999, she wrote the book A History of Point Pleasant Park. Kitz also wrote the biography of the Canadian-American architect Andrew R. Cobb in 2014, Andrew Cobb: Architect and Artist.
