= Francis Demont =

18th-century French pirate

- Occupation: Pirate
- Years active: 1716-1717
- Piratical career
- Base of operations: Caribbean

Francis Demont (fl. 1716–1717) was a pirate active in the Caribbean. His trial was important in establishing Admiralty law in South Carolina.

== History ==
Demont, along with fellow pirates Stephen James De Losey (or De Cossey), Francis Rusoe (or Rossoe), and Emanuel Ernandos (or Ernados), had captured the sloop Virgin Queen near Cuba, the ship Tanner in the Bahamas, and the ships Penelope and Turtle Dove off Jamaica around July 1716. The Turtle Dove's Captain testified that they had "imprisoned him and his crew in bodily fear of their life." The pirates were captured and tried in July 1717. Nicholas Trott presided over the Charleston trial. The pirates all pled not guilty. De Losey, Rusoe, and Ernandos were found guilty and hanged; Demont may have been executed as well, though sources differ, and he may have been acquitted.

Trying and executing pirates was a priority of newly arrived Governor Robert Johnson. Having established the authority of South Carolina's Vice-Admiralty Court (a November trial for piracy had resulted only in acquittals), Trott would later go on to preside over the trials of other pirates, notably Blackbeard’s associate Stede Bonnet.

== See also ==
- Admiralty court – the venue established by Trott, in which Demont, Bonnet, and others were tried.
