= George Demont Otis =

American painter

George Demont Otis (1879 - 1962) was an American landscape painter.

George Demont Otis was born in Memphis, Tennessee, on 21 September 1879. He was orphaned at the age of six, and was sent to live with an aunt in Sedalia, Missouri. When he twelve, he was placed with a family in Chicago.

He began his artistic education at the age of fourteen, at the Chicago Fine Art Academy, and continued it in Philadelphia and New York. He also had a short career in baseball, in Nashville and Memphis, using his earnings to finance his art training. Otis returned to Chicago in 1900 and spent the next fourteen years there, teaching, restoring and designing for the stage at the Opera House and other venues.

Following an illness in 1916 he moved to Colorado, and set up a studio at Estes Park. While based there, he also painted landscapes in Utah, Arizona, New Mexico and Texas, and scenes of the daily life of the native peoples of the Southwest.

In 1924 he moved to Burbank, California, where he worked as a Hollywood scene designer for Metro-Goldwyn-Mayer. He abandoned his work there abruptly, and spent some time traveling around the Southwest before, settling in San Francisco. He married in 1931. Over the next couple of years, he and his wife spent the summers in Nevada, painting and selling his pictures from a wooden stand. He spent the rest of his life in Kentfield, California.
