= Lancelot Press =

Canadian publishing company

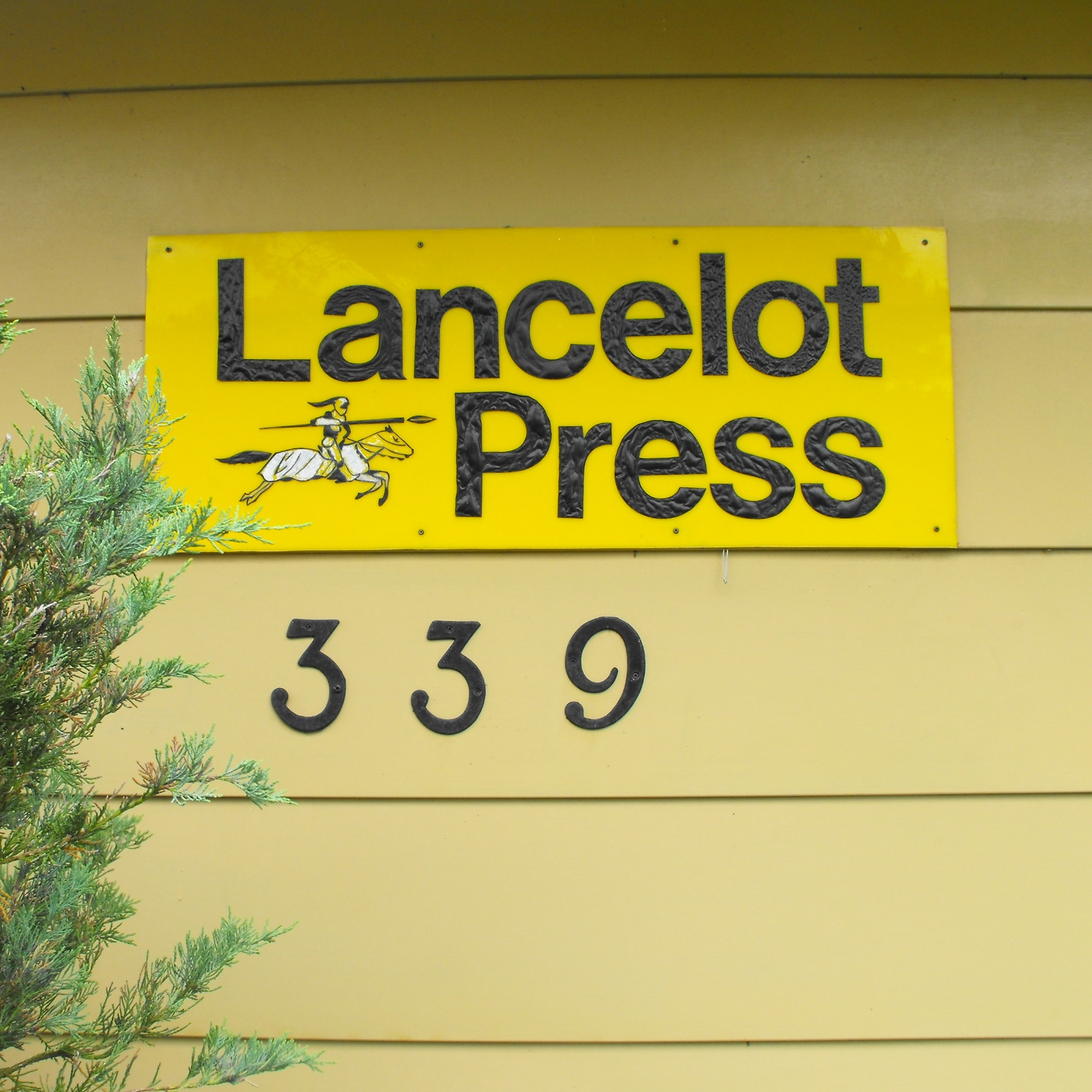
Lancelot Press

Lancelot Press was a Canadian publishing company which operated between 1966 and 1997. It specialized in non-fiction titles, many of which were of a regional nature centered on Maritime Canada, in the fields of local history, spirituality and personal memoirs. For many years, Lancelot was one of the very few Maritime publishing companies.

The business was founded by Reverend William Pope (1923-2010), a United Church minister, near Hantsport, Nova Scotia. Responsibilities for its operation were shared with his wife Isabel. Between its founding and wrapping up, it published more than 500 titles. Many well-known writers in the region published with Lancelot, including Douglas How, Bridglal Pachai, Alden Nowlan and Dorothy Perkyns. The poet Margaret Avison published several titles with Lancelot including No Time (1989) which won the Governor General's Award for Poetry.

Many Lancelot Press titles remain in print through a publishing arrangement with Nimbus.

== Robert Pope Foundation ==
The Popes wrapped up Lancelot Press in 1997 to focus on a new enterprise, the Robert Pope Foundation. Named for their late son and artist Robert Pope, who died of Hodgkins Lymphoma, the foundation shares his legacy of art which conveyed the artist's impressions of illness and healing from a patient's point of view. His work was published in the book Illness and Healing: Images of Cancer, which is today presented by the Robert Pope Foundation to first-year medical students across Canada. Pope's Illness and Healing was the recipient of the Richardson Award in 1992. In 2012, Pope's work was the subject of a retrospective exhibition at the Art Gallery of Nova Scotia.

== Selected writers and works published ==
Writer	Titles	Year	Notes
Margaret Avison	sunblue A Kind of Perseverance; No time* Not Yet but Still	1978; 1984; 1989; 1997	* Winner, Governor General's Award for Poetry
Douglas How	Canada's Mystery Man of High Finance; Night of the Caribou; One Village One War	1986; 1988; 1995	-
J. E. Belliveau	The Splendid Life of Albert Smith and the Women He Left Behind; Running Far In: The Story of Shediac; The Monctonians (Vol. 1); The Monctonians (Vol. 2); The headliners: behind the scenes memoirs "Crackie": the Sumner family business dynasty	1976; 1977; 1981; 1982; 1984; 1986	-
Allison Mitcham	Offshore islands of Nova Scotia and New Brunswick; Three Remarkable Maritimers; Paradise or Purgatory; Island Keepers; Atlin, the last utopia Signs of the times The angora goat: its history, management and diseases Taku: the heart of North America's last great wilderness The Best of Abraham Gesner; Poetic voices of the Maritimes: a selection of contemporary poetry	1984; 1985; 1986; 1989; 1989; 1990; 1992; 1993; 1995; 1996	with Stephanie Mitcham Sexton with Theresia Quigley
Jean Vanier	Images of love, words of hope A network of friends, volume one : 1964-1973 : the letters of Jean Vanier to the friends and communities of L'Arche	1991; 1992	
James Cameron	About Pictonians; More About Pictonians; Still More About Pictonians	1979; 1983; 1985	-
Watson Kirkconnell	The Flavour of Nova Scotia; Designs Upon the Trestle Board	1976; 1981	Poetry non-fiction
Bridglal Pachai	My Africa, My Canada	1989	-
Alden Nowlan	Nine Micmac Legends	1983	-
Charles R. Saunders	Sweat and Soul	1990	-
Dorothy Perkyns	The Mystery of the Hemlock Ravine; Rachel's Revolution*; The Mastodon Mystery; Peril at Plover Point; Signal Across the Sea	1986; 1988; 1996; 1991; 1994	* Co-winner, Billson Award
Vincent Durant	Warhorse of Cumberland: The Life and Times of Sir Charles Tupper	1985	Biography

== See also ==
- Literature of Nova Scotia
- List of writers from Nova Scotia
