= Royal Nova Scotia Historical Society =

Canadian historical society

The Royal Nova Scotia Historical Society is a historical society in Halifax, Nova Scotia that was founded in 1878 and is the third oldest in Canada (The Literary and Historical Society of Quebec is the first, founded in 1824, followed by the York Pioneers which was founded in 1869.) The Society is a voluntary organization that operates without an office or paid staff. The Society first published the Nova Scotia Historical Quarterly and then the Nova Scotia Historical Review. Eventually, the publication was named the Collections of the Royal Nova Scotia Historical Society and now it is known as the Journal of the Royal Nova Scotia Historical Society.

== Notable members ==
- Thomas Beamish Akins (1809–1921), Nova Scotia's first Commissioner of Public Records.
- Phyllis Blakeley (1922–1986), Provincial Archivist of Nova Scotia from 1982 to 1985.
- John Forrest (1842–1920), President of Dalhousie University, who served as the Society's President from 1905 to 1906.
- Archibald MacMechan (1862–1933), Professor at Dalhousie University.
- Harry Piers (1870–1940), historian and curator at the Nova Scotia Museum.

== Historical Plaques ==
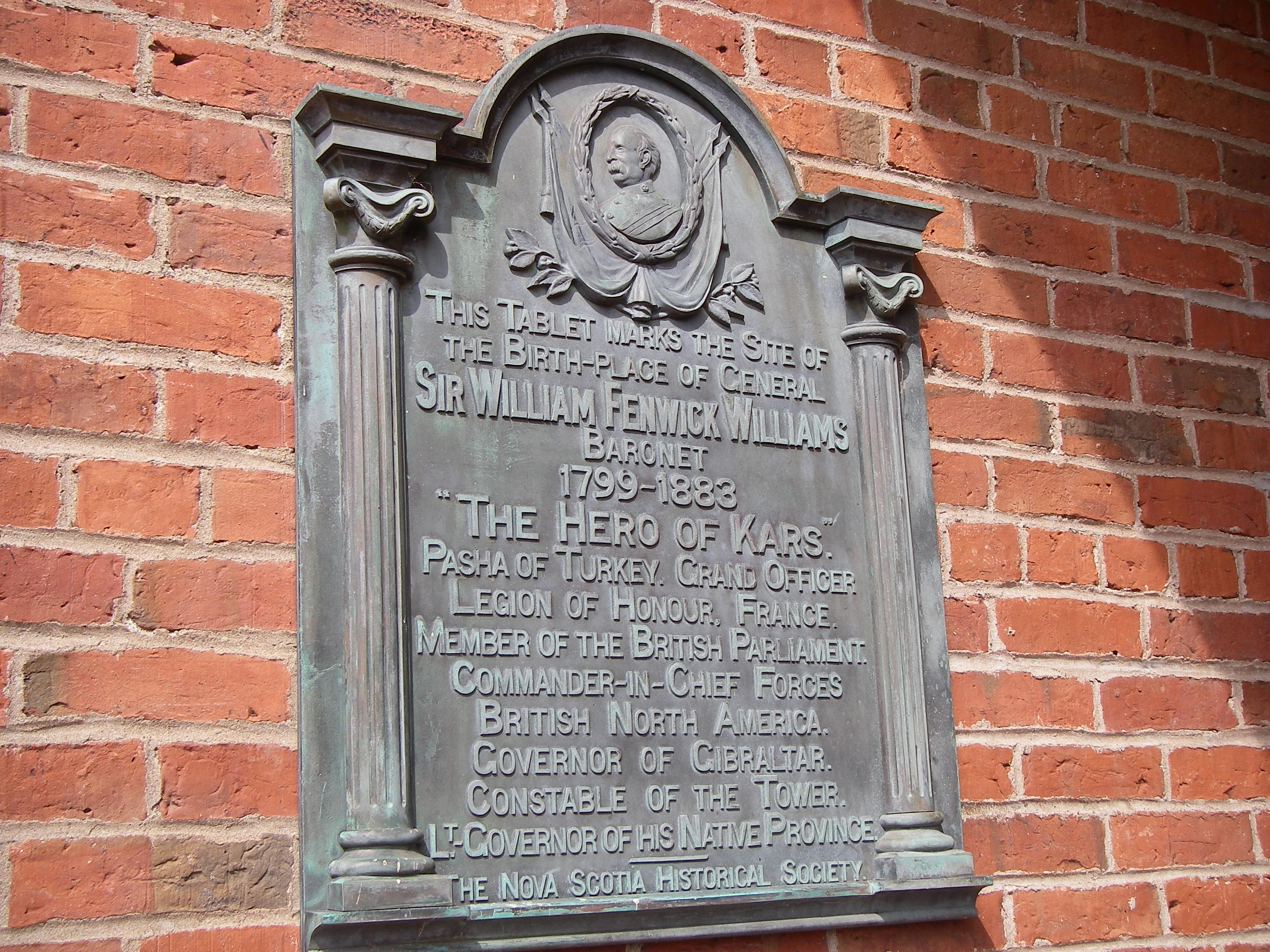
Sir William Fenwick Williams, Annapolis Royal, Nova Scotia

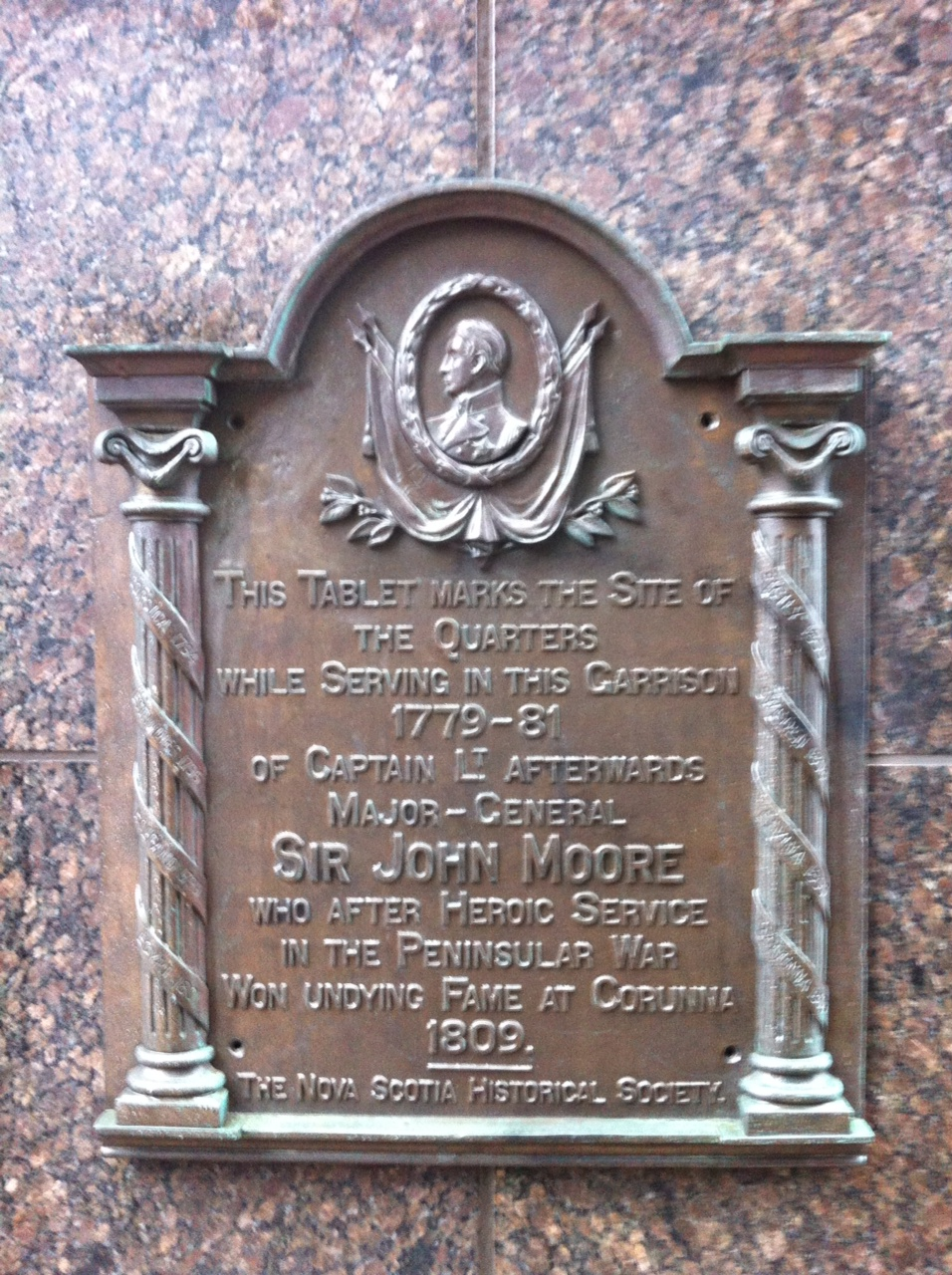
Sir John Moore Plaque Halifax, Nova Scotia

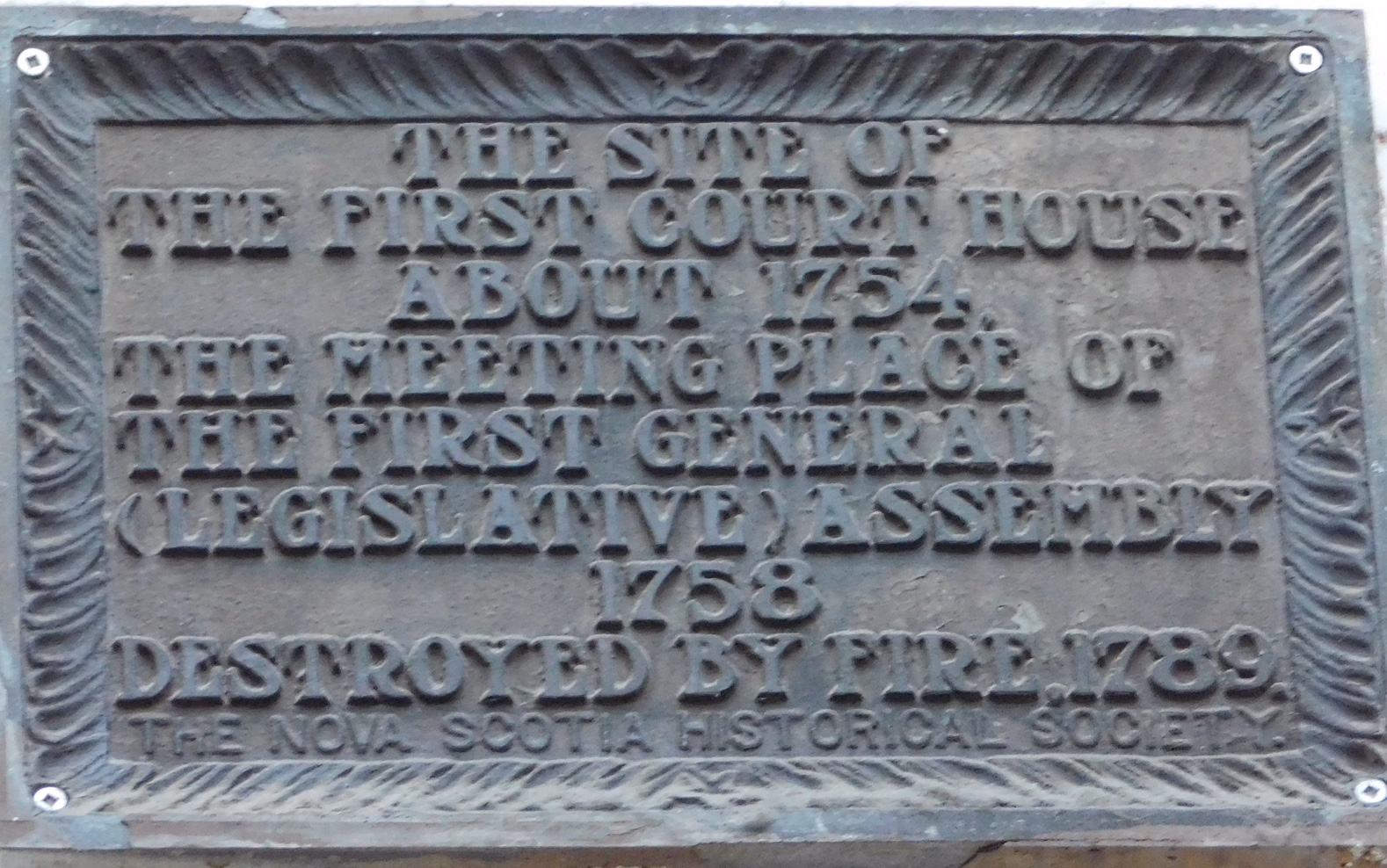
Site of First Court House Plaque, Scotia Square, Halifax, Nova Scotia

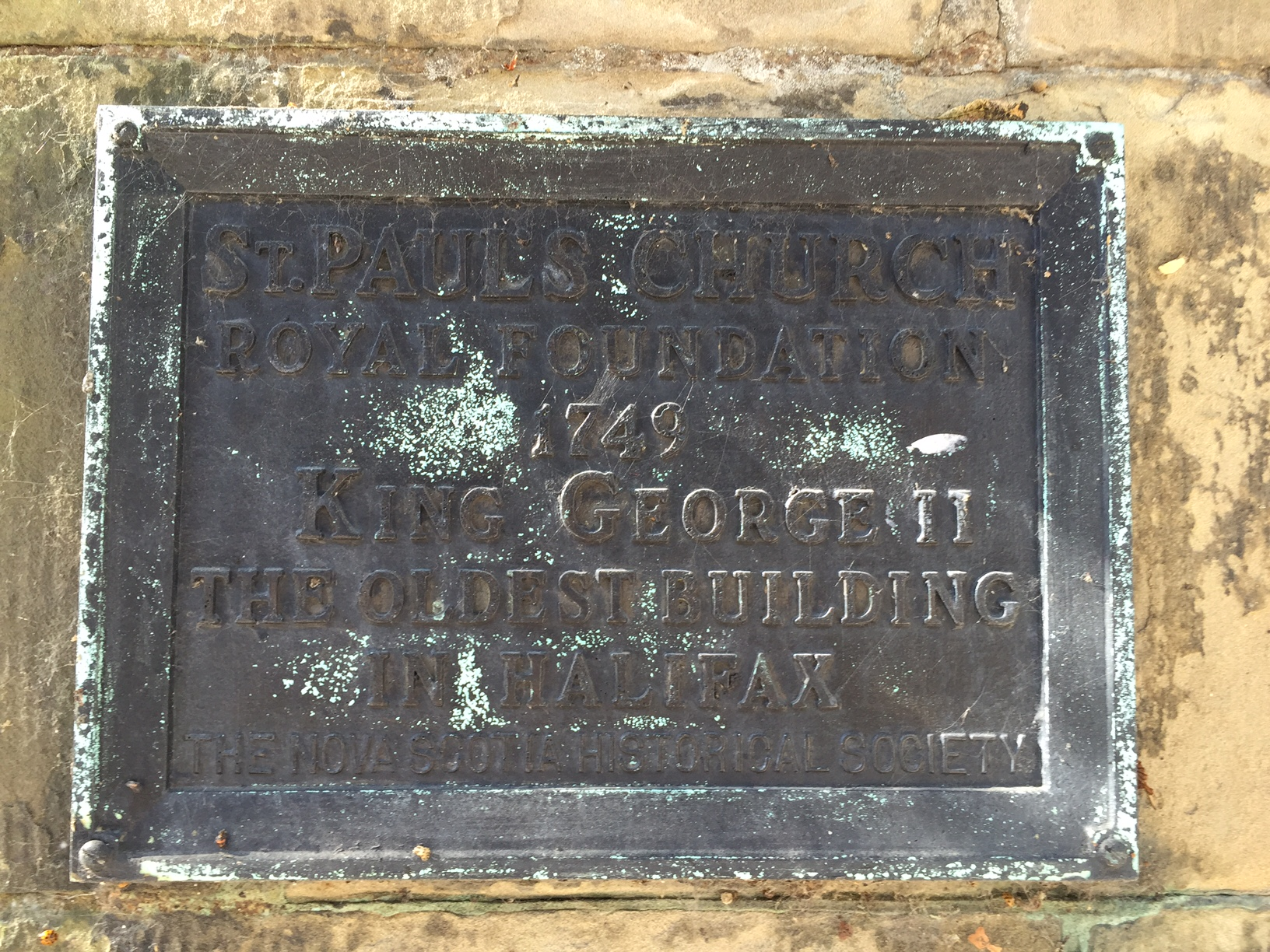
St. Paul's Church (Halifax)

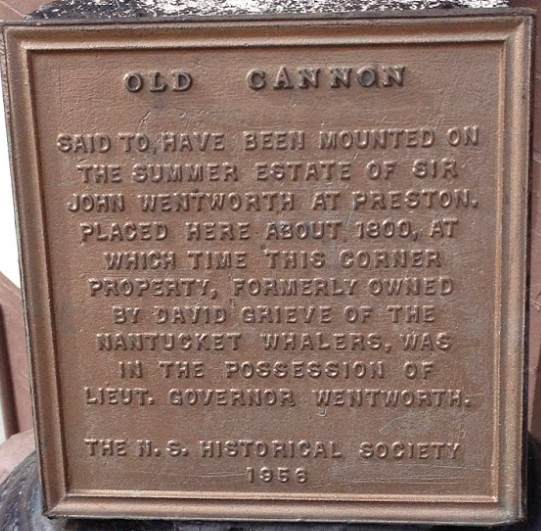
John Wentworth's Cannon, Dartmouth, Nova Scotia

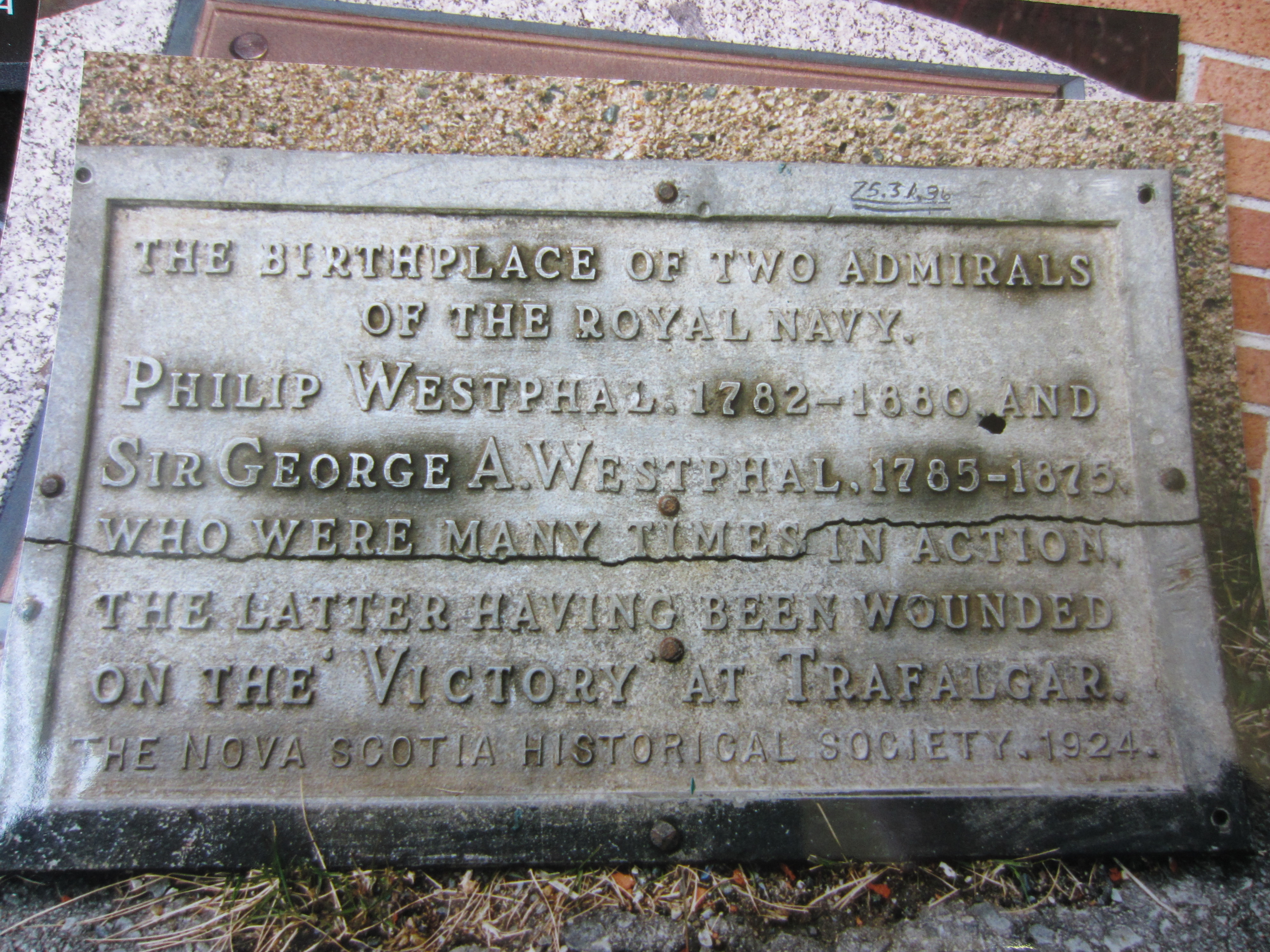
George Augustus Westphal's Birthplace, Dartmouth, Nova Scotia (Dartmouth Heritage Museum)

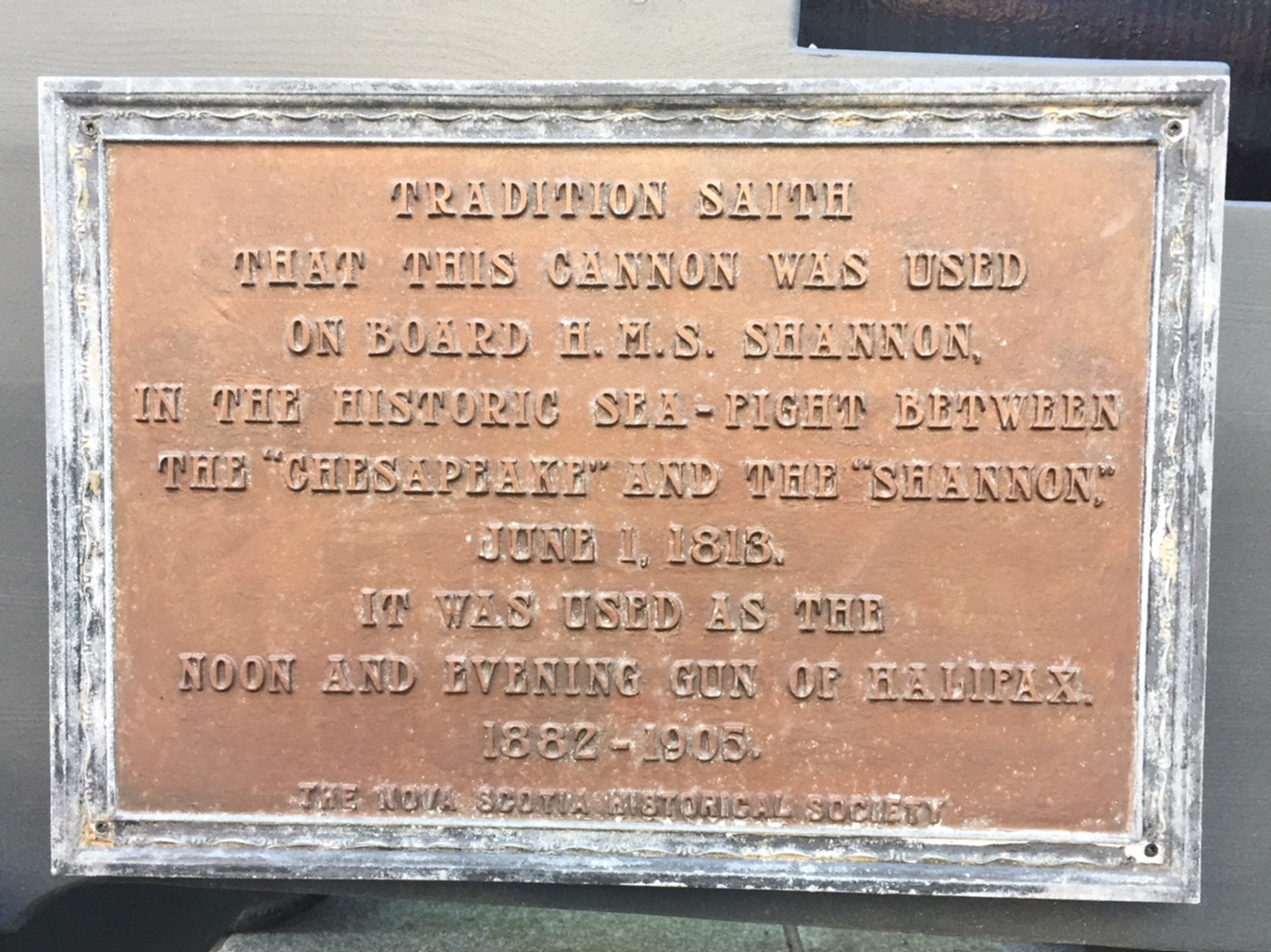
HMS Shannon Plaque, Province House (Nova Scotia)

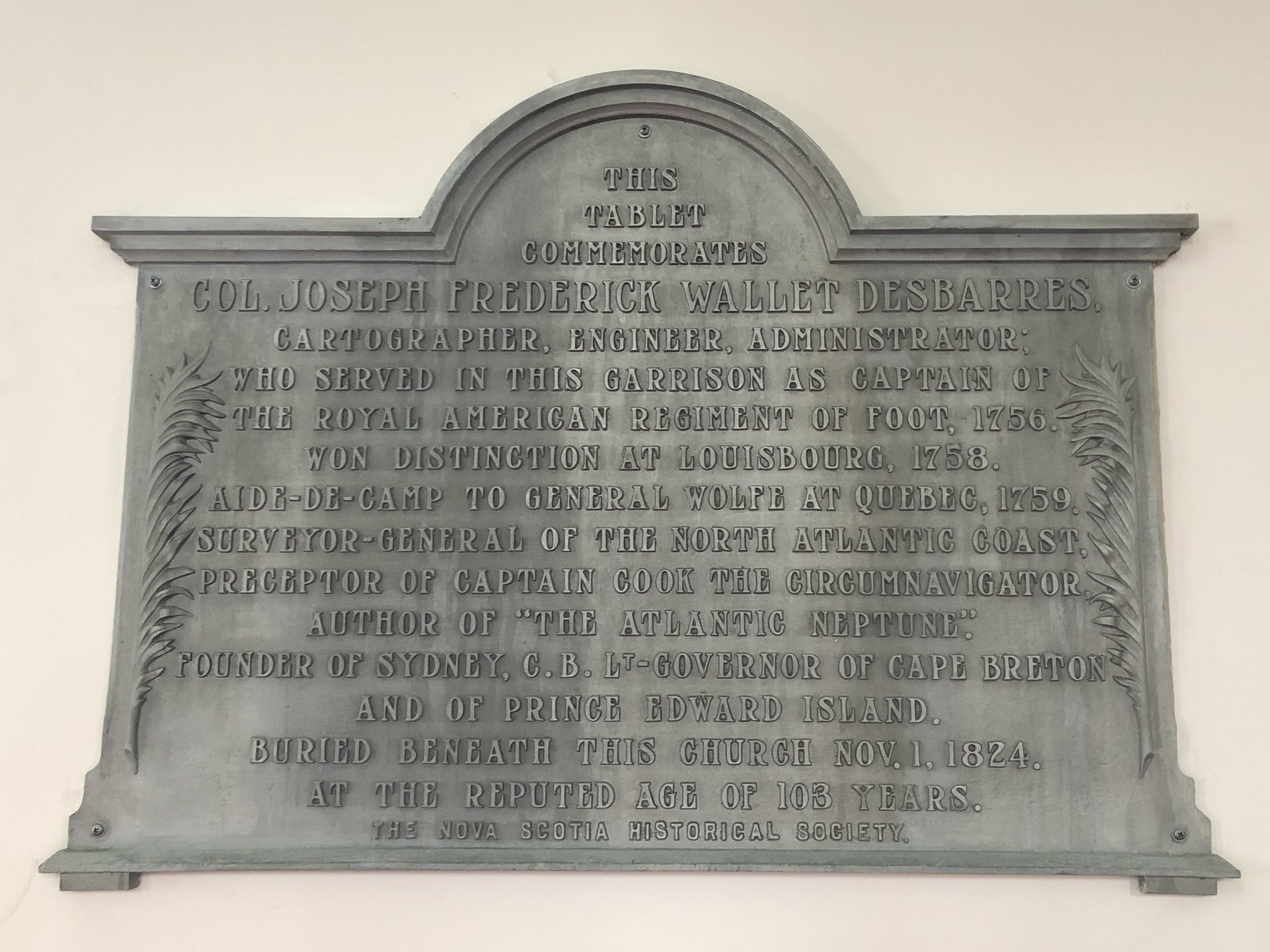
Joseph Frederick Wallet DesBarres Monument, St. George's Church, Halifax, Nova Scotia
- Treaty Day in Nova Scotia - Plaque of the Royal Nova Scotia Historical Society
- Nova Scotia Historical Society - 23 Plaques Created, 1911
- Nova Scotia Historical Society - 9 Plaques Created, 1914

== Collections of the Nova Scotia Historical Society ==
- Article Index
- NS Historical Society 1879 Vol 1
- NS Historical Society 1881 Vol 2
- NS Historical Society 1882-83 Vol 3
- NS Historical Society 1884 Vol 4
- NS Historical Society 1886-87 Vol 5
- NS Historical Society 1888, Vol 6
- NS Historical Society 1889-91, Vol. 7
- NS Historical Society 1892-94, Vol.8
- NS Historical Society - Louisbourg 1894
- NS Historical Society 1895
- NS Historical Society 1896-98
- NS Historical Society 1899-1900, Vol. 11
- Collections of the Nova Scotia Historical Society, #12 (1905)
- Collections of the Nova Scotia Historical Society, vol. 13, 1908
- NS Historical Society 1910, Vol.14
- Index 1878-1910
- NS Historical Society 1911, Vol. 15
- NS Historical Society 1912
- NS Historical Society 1913
- NS Historical Society 1914
- NS Historical Society 1918, Vol.19
- NS Historical Society 1921, Vol.20
- NS Historical Society 1927, Vol.21
- The memorial sundial at Annapolis Royal: paper read before the Nova Scotia Historical Society, at Halifax, N.S. December the sixth, 1918 (1918)

== See also ==
- Nova Scotia Archives and Records Management
- Massachusetts Historical Society
- Maine Historical Society
- New Brunswick Historical Society
