= Formac Lorimer Books =

Canadian publishing company

- Founder: James Lorimer
- Country of origin: Canada
- Headquarters location: Halifax, Nova Scotia
- Publication types: Books
- Imprints: James Lorimer & Company; Formac Publishing Company
- Official website: formaclorimerbooks.ca

Formac Lorimer Books is a Canadian publishing and distribution company based in Halifax, Nova Scotia, Canada. The company is owned by James Lorimer, and has two related publishing houses: James Lorimer & Company in Toronto, Ontario; and Formac Publishing Company in Halifax, Nova Scotia.

== Formac Publishing Company ==
Formac Publishing Company was established in 1977 by Carroll MacIntyre, and is based in Halifax, Nova Scotia. The company was purchased by James Lorimer in 1982. Since 1982, Formac has published over 700 books by over 600 authors. Formac's publications are focused on regional non-fiction and children's fiction books. Formac publishes a series of Colourguide travel books which have been received positively, including multiple editions of a Nova Scotia Colourguide released between 1994 and 2009.

In 1989, Nova Scotia politician Richard Weldon brought a lawsuit against Formac and Peter Kavanagh, for a book written by Kavanagh and published by Formac called John Buchanan — The Art of Political Survival. Weldon accused Kavanagh and Formac of "falsely and maliciously writing and publishing untruths against him." Formac pulled the book from store shelves due to what they referred to as "an error".

In 2018, Formac held a competition called Write to Win! in which they encouraged writers who reside in Atlantic Canada to submit their books to Formac to potentially be published. Formac offered the winner of the contest a CAD$1,500 cash prize, as well as an offer of publication for their submitted book.

=== Notable publications ===
- Fenton, Andre (2019). Worthy of Love. Halifax, NS: Formac Publishing Company. ISBN 978-1-4595-0548-3.

== James Lorimer & Company ==
James Lorimer & Company was founded in 1970 by James Lorimer, and is based in Toronto, Ontario. Since its establishment, the company has published more than 1,500 books by over 1,000 separate authors. The company primarily publishes non-fiction books related to Canada and Canadian history.

=== Notable publications ===
- Gutstein, Donald (2014). Harperism: How Stephen Harper and his think tank colleagues have transformed Canada. Toronto, ON: James Lorimer & Company. ISBN 978-1-4594-0663-6.
- Zuhair, Kashmeri; McAndrew, Brian (1989). Soft Target: How the Indian Intelligence Service Penetrated Canada. Toronto, ON: James Lorimer & Company. ISBN 1-5502-8221-2.

== See also ==
- Literature of Nova Scotia
- List of English-language book publishing companies
