= List of writers from Nova Scotia =

The Canadian province of Nova Scotia has a strong literary output, with writers across a wide variety of genres. This list includes notable writers who were born in Nova Scotia or spent a significant portion of their writing career living in Nova Scotia.

== A ==
- Don Aker (born 1955), novelist, short story writer
- Thomas Beamish Akins (1809–1891), historian
- Lisa Alward (born 1962), short story writer

== B ==
- John Ballem (1925–2010), novelist, poet
- Catherine Banks (living), playwright
- Frances Bannerman (1855-1944), poet
- Gary Bannerman (1947–2011), journalist
- Joyce Barkhouse (1913–2012), children's writer
- Joan Baxter (living), journalist, non-fiction writer
- James Murray Beck (1914–2011), historian
- Winthrop Pickard Bell (1884–1965), historian, philosopher
- Renée Belliveau (living), memoirist, novelist
- Chris Benjamin (born 1975), journalist, novelist, non-fiction writer
- Rob Benvie (living), novelist
- Kris Bertin (living), short story writer
- Carrie Best (1903–2001), journalist
- Ingraham Ebenezer Bill (1805–1891), journalist
- Will R. Bird (1891–1984), novelist, travel writer, historian
- Bill Bissett (born 1939), poet
- Minnie Blanche Bishop (1864–1917), poet
- Edward Blackadder (1874–1922)
- William Rufus Blake (1805–1863), playwright
- Phyllis Blakeley (1922–1986), historian, biographer
- H. Percy Blanchard (1862–1939), novelist
- Walter Borden (born 1942), poet, playwright
- Hélène Boudreau (born 1969), children's writer
- George Boyd (1952–2020), playwright
- Binnie Brennan (born 1961), novelist, short story writer
- Thomas J. Brown (1867–1926), non-fiction writer
- Charles Tory Bruce (1906–1971), journalist, poet, novelist
- Harry Bruce (1934–2024), journalist, non-fiction writer
- Carol Bruneau (born 1956), novelist, short story writer
- Ali Bryan (living), novelist
- Ernest Buckler (1908–1984), novelist, short story writer
- Jaime Burnet (living), novelist
- Alec Butler (born 1959), playwright

== C ==
- George Frederick Cameron (1854–1885), poet, journalist
- Silver Donald Cameron (1937–2020), journalist, playwright, non-fiction writer
- Ronald Caplan (born 1945), historian, short story writer
- Charlene Carr (living), novelist
- Paul Chiasson (living), pseudohistory writer
- George Fisher Chipman (1882–1935), journalist
- Lesley Choyce (born 1951), novelist, poet, non-fiction writer
- George Elliott Clarke (born 1960), poet, playwright
- Joan Clark (1934–2023), novelist, children's writer
- Mike Clattenburg (born 1967), screenwriter
- Lynn Coady (born 1970), novelist, journalist
- Devon Code (living), novelist
- Germaine Comeau (born 1946), novelist, playwright
- Phil Comeau (born 1956), screenwriter
- Bill Conall (living), novelist, humorist
- Christy Ann Conlin (living), novelist, short story writer
- Dan Conlin (living), historian
- Margaret Conrad (born 1946), historian
- Lesley Crewe (born 1955), novelist
- Richard Crouse (born 1963), film writer
- Oisin Curran (living), novelist
- Sheldon Currie (born 1934), novelist
- Brian Cuthbertson (1936–2023), historian
- George Barton Cutten (1874–1962), psychologist, philosopher, historian

== D ==
- Laurence Bradford Dakin (1904–1972), poet
- Pauline Dakin (born 1965), journalist, non-fiction writer
- Frank Cyril Shaw Davison (1893–1960), novelist
- Nicola Davison (living), novelist
- Joan Dawson (living), historian
- Frank Parker Day (1881–1950), novelist
- James De Mille (1833–1880), novelist
- John DeMont (living), journalist, non-fiction writer
- Clara Dennis (1881–1958), journalist, travel writer
- J. Alphonse Deveau (1917–2004), historian
- Emma Lucy Dickson (1854–1926), novelist
- Don Domanski (1950–2020), poet
- James Doull (1918–2001), philosopher

== E ==
- Arthur Wentworth Hamilton Eaton (1849–1937), historian, poet
- Evelyn Eaton (1902–1983), novelist, short-story writer, poet
- Cathy Elliott (1957–2017), playwright
- Shirley Elliott (1916–2004), historian
- Marie Elwood (1932–2012), historian
- Ainslie Embree (1921–2017), Indologist and historian

== F ==
- Charles Fenerty (1821–1892), poet
- Charles Bruce Fergusson (1911–1978), historian
- Roscoe Fillmore (1887–1968)
- Judith Fingard (born 1943), historian
- Sheree Fitch (born 1956), poet, children's writer
- Elizabeth Frame (1820–1904), historian
- Hal Fredericks (living)
- E. G. Fulton (1867–1949), cookbook writer

== G ==
- Susan Gillis (living), poet
- Lorri Neilsen Glenn (living), poet, ethnographer, essayist
- Susan Goyette (born 1964), poet
- Hilda Kay Grant (1910–1996), novelist, non-fiction writer
- Shauntay Grant (living), poet, playwright
- Barbara Grantmyre (1908–1977), non-fiction writer, short story writer
- Jeff Green (born 1956), playwright, screenwriter
- Darren Greer (born 1968), novelist, essayist
- Justin Gregg (living), science writer
- James Gregor (living), novelist
- Naomi E. S. Griffiths (born 1934), historian

== H ==
- Max Haines (1931–2017), true crime writer
- Susan Haley (born 1949), novelist
- Thomas Chandler Haliburton (1796–1865), novelist
- William B. Hamilton (1929–2012), historian
- Bretten Hannam (living), screenwriter
- Lisa Harrington (born 1965), novelist, short story writer
- Carrie Jenkins Harris (1860–1903), novelist
- Daniel Cobb Harvey (1886–1966), historian
- Jack Hawkins (born 1932), non-fiction writer
- Mary Eliza Herbert (1829–1872), poet, novelist
- Sarah Herbert (1824–1846), poet
- Kay Hill (1917–2011), screenwriter, children's writer
- Rick Howe (1954–2024), journalist, memoirist
- David Huebert (living), novelist, poet, short story writer
- Annie Campbell Huestis (1876–1960), poet
- Tanya Huff (born 1957), novelist

== I ==
- George K. Ilsley (born 1958), novelist, short story writer

== J ==
- Niki Jabbour (living), garden writer
- Thibault Jacquot-Paratte (born 1993), novelist, poet, short story writer
- Amelia Clotilda Jennings (died 1895), poet, novelist
- Dean Jobb (living), journalist, true crime writer
- Rita Joe (1932–2007), poet
- George Johnson (1837–1911), journalist, statistician
- Troy Jollimore (born 1971), poet, philosopher
- Alice Jones (1853–1933), novelist, travel writer
- Amy Jones (living), novelist
- El Jones (living), poet, journalist

== K ==
- Mary Jane Katzmann (1828–1890), poet, historian
- Stephen Kimber (born 1949), journalist, non-fiction writer
- Janet Kitz (1930–2019), historian

== L ==
- Joy Laking (born 1950), playwright, children's writer
- John Lent (born 1948), poet, novelist
- Kenneth Leslie (1892–1974), poet
- Neil Libbey (living), historian
- Wendy Lill (born 1950), playwright, screenwriter
- Linda Little (born 1959), novelist
- Lezlie Lowe (living), journalist, non-fiction writer

== M ==
- Bryden MacDonald (born 1960), playwright
- Allister MacGillivray (born 1948), music historian
- James Drummond MacGregor (1759–1830), poet
- Daniel MacIvor (born 1962), playwright
- Julianne MacLean (living), novelist
- Hugh MacLennan (1907–1990), novelist, non-fiction writer
- Alexander MacLeod (born 1972), short story writer
- Alistair MacLeod (1936–2014), novelist, short story writer
- Mary Jane Maffini (living), novelist
- Allan Marble (born 1939), medical historian
- Julia McCarthy (1964–2021), poet
- Christopher McCreery (born 1975), historian
- Helen McCully (1902–1977), cookbook writer
- Peter Thomas McGuigan (1942–2017), historian
- Leo McKay Jr. (born 1964), novelist, short story writer
- Peter Evander McKerrow (1841–1906), historian
- Jean McNeil (born 1968), novelist, travel writer
- Marguerite McNeil (1935–2021), playwright
- Steve McOrmond (living), poet
- Michael Melski (1969–2025), playwright
- Joshua Mensch (living), poet
- Alain Mercieca (living), playwright, screenwriter
- Sarah Mian (living), novelist, poet, short story writer
- Robert Morgan (1938–2011), historian
- Beamish Murdoch (1800–1876), historian
- Christian Murray (living), screenwriter
- Melanie Murray (living), novelist
- Thomas John Murray (born 1938), medical historian
- Maria Mutch (living), memoirist, short story writer

== N ==
- William D. Naftel (1940–2018), historian
- Mai Nguyen (living), novelist
- Moses H. Nickerson (1844–1943), journalist, poet
- Marie Nightingale (1928–2014), cookbook writer
- Chad Norman (born c. 1958), poet
- Alden Nowlan (1933–1983), poet, novelist, playwright

== O ==
- Vernon Oickle (living), journalist, non-fiction writer, folklore writer
- Pearleen Oliver (1917–2008), historian
- James Macdonald Oxley (1855–1907), novelist

== P ==
- Elizabeth Pacey (living), non-fiction writer
- Bridglal Pachai (1927–2019), historian
- Susan Paddon (living), poet
- John Palmer (1943–2020), playwright
- Frank Harris Patterson (1891–1976), historian
- Daniel N. Paul (1938–2023), journalist, non-fiction writer
- Joan Payzant (1925–2013), novelist
- Laura Penny (born 1975), non-fiction writer
- Amanda Peters (living), novelist, short story writer
- Sara Peters (living), novelist and poet
- Constance Piers (1866–1939), journalist, poet
- Harry Piers (1870–1940), historian
- Karen Pinchin (living), journalist, science writer
- Noah Pink (living), screenwriter
- Jen Powley (1977–2023), memoirist, non-fiction writer

== Q ==
- Anna Quon (living), poet, novelist

== R ==
- Thomas Head Raddall (1903–1994), novelist, non-fiction writer
- Stephan Regina-Thon (1946–2003), playwright, screenwriter
- Rachel Reid (living), novelist
- Charlie Rhindress (born 1966), playwright, non-fiction writer
- Evelyn M. Richardson (1902–1976), novelist, memoirist, non-fiction writer
- Charles Ritchie (1906–1995), diarist
- Danica Roache (living), poet, novelist
- Marie-Colombe Robichaud (born 1943), playwright, historian
- Margaret Robinson (born 1973), feminist scholar
- Matt Robinson (born 1974), poet
- Rick Rofihe (born 1950), short story writer
- Grace Dean Rogers (1863–1958), historian
- Calvin Ruck (1925–2004), non-fiction writer

== S ==
- Trish Salah (living), poet
- Jacob Sampson (born 1988), playwright
- Roger Sarty (born 1952), historian
- Gary Saunders (born 1935), non-fiction writer
- Margaret Marshall Saunders (1861–1947), novelist, children's writer
- Joseph Sherman (1945–2006), poet
- Alfred Silver (living), novelist, playwright
- Craig Silverman (living), journalist
- Marjorie Simmins (born 1959), journalist, essayist, non-fiction writer
- Johanna Skibsrud (born 1980), novelist, poet
- Ray Smith (1941–2019), novelist, short story writer
- Thomas Barlow Smith (1839–1933)
- Amy Spurway (living), novelist
- Colin Starnes (living)

== T ==
- Jon Tattrie (living), journalist, non-fiction writer
- Harry Thurston (born 1950), poet, journalist, non-fiction writer
- Constance Tomkinson (1915–1995), memoirist
- Grizelda Elizabeth Cottnam Tonge (1803–1825), poet
- Jackie Torrens (living), playwright
- Kaleigh Trace (born 1986), memoirist
- Brian Tucker (living), novelist
- Maxine Tynes (1949–2011), poet

== V ==
- Mary Vingoe (1955–2025), playwright

== W ==
- Matthew Walsh (living), poet
- Karen Walton (living), screenwriter
- Michelle Wamboldt (living), journalist, novelist
- Noah Warren (living), poet
- Ruth Holmes Whitehead (1947–2023), historian and ethnologist
- Aaron Williams (living), non-fiction writer
- Budge Wilson (1927–2021), children's writer

== See also ==
- Literature of Nova Scotia
- Writers' Federation of Nova Scotia
- Lists of Canadian writers
- List of writers from New Brunswick
- List of writers from Newfoundland and Labrador
- List of writers from Prince Edward Island
