= Nicola Davison =

Canadian writer and photographer

Nicola Davison is a Canadian writer and photographer from Nova Scotia. She won the Ann Connor Brimer Award in 2023 for her book Decoding Dot Grey.

== Biography ==
Nicola Davison was born in Nova Scotia, and is based in the community of Dartmouth. She published her first novel, In the Wake, in 2018, after attending a workshop directed by Donna Morrissey through the Writers' Federation of Nova Scotia. While writing the book, she was mentored by Carol Bruneau, with whom she later became friends. In the Wake won the Margaret and John Savage First Book Award in 2019. Her next book, Decoding Dot Grey, was the winner of the Ann Connor Brimer Award in 2023 and was nominated for a White Pine Award.

In addition to her writing, Davison is also a photographer. Her style of photography is documentary, preferring shots where the subject is looking away from the camera. She has taken portrait photographs of writers such as Lesley Crewe and A. J. B. Johnston.

== Publications ==
- Davison, Nicola (2018). In the Wake. Halifax, N.S.: Nimbus Publishing. ISBN 978-1-7710-8664-6.
- — (2022). Decoding Dot Grey. Halifax, N.S.: Nimbus Publishing. ISBN 978-1-7747-1056-2.
