= Margaret Robinson (disambiguation) =

Margaret Robinson (born 1951) is a British molecular cell biologist, a professor and researcher in the Cambridge Institute for Medical Research, at the University of Cambridge.

Other people with the name include:

- Margaret Robinson (activist and scholar), feminist scholar
- Margaret King Robinson (1906–2006), oceanographer
- Margaret M. Robinson, mathematician
