= 1847 Woodstock riot =

1847 civil disturbance in Woodstock, New Brunswick

- Date: July 12, 1847
- Location: Woodstock, New Brunswick; 46°09′13″N 67°34′25″W
- Caused by: Tension between Protestants and Irish Catholics, specifically concerning celebrations of The Twelfth
- Result: 139 Irish Catholics charged with crimes stemming from the riot, with 35 found guilty of either rioting or unlawful assembly; Growth of the Orange Order in Carleton County, New Brunswick

Parties
Orange Order	Catholics

Casualties and losses
	Up to 10

On July 12, 1847, a riot occurred in Woodstock, New Brunswick, between Catholics and Protestant members of the Orange Order. The violence resulted in the deaths of up to ten individuals and has been described by Canadian journalist Dan Soucoup as "one of New Brunswick's worst ethnic confrontations".

During the 1840s, New Brunswick experienced an increase in immigration from Ireland. Tensions rose between the largely Catholic immigrants and the largely Protestant population of the colony, resulting in various incidents of violence between the two groups. During this time, many Protestants either joined or supported the Orange Order, a society that promoted Protestant dominance in society. Among other things, the Orange Order organized annual celebrations of the Protestant holiday The Twelfth on July 12, which often led to violence between Catholics and Protestants.

In 1846, an Orange Order lodge was established in Woodstock, and the following year, they announced plans for a procession on The Twelfth. That day, a group of about 200 to 300 individuals, most of whom were armed, marched out of the town and to a nearby Baptist church several miles away. In the meantime, a Catholic group of about the same size congregated on a hill outside of town limits. When the two sides met, a shootout commenced. The Orange Order largely overpowered the Catholics, resulting in the deaths of up to ten Irish Catholics. In the aftermath, 139 Catholics were charged with various crimes, and in the subsequent trial, 35 were found guilty.

The riot was one of several to occur on the same day in New Brunswick, alongside similar outbreaks in Fredericton and Saint John. In its aftermath, the Orange Order experienced significant growth in Carleton County, which became a stronghold for the group in New Brunswick. According to historian Scott W. See, the riot "underscored the second-class citizenship" that the Irish Catholics in the region experienced.

== Background ==
=== Irish immigration to New Brunswick ===
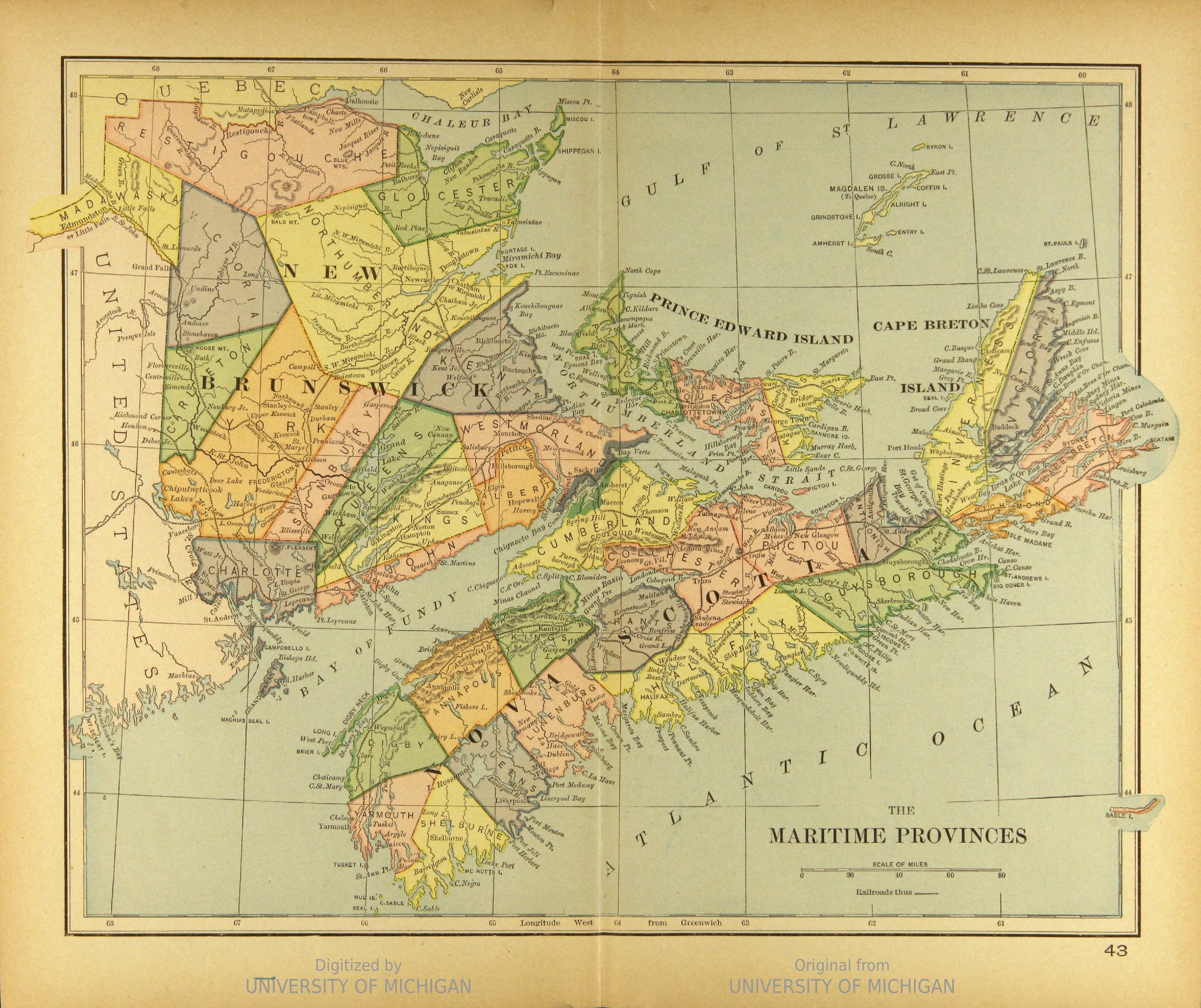
1894 map of the Maritimes, showing Woodstock, New Brunswick, along the Saint John River in Carleton County

In the 1840s, the Crown colony of New Brunswick experienced an increase in immigration from Ireland. 1846 saw 9,000 Irish immigrants arrive in the colony, which increased to 17,000 the following year. Prior to 1840, many Irish immigrants to New Brunswick had settled near the colony's coast, in cities such as Miramichi and Saint John. After 1840, however, Irish immigrants began settling in larger numbers in inland municipalities, such as Fredericton—the colony's capital—and Woodstock, a town located along the Saint John River about 65 miles (105 kilometres) upriver from Fredericton, near the United States border. By 1851, a majority of New Brunswick's population was Irish, with many of the Irish being Catholic. However, Protestants still outnumbered Catholics in the colony.

The increase in Irish immigration occurred during a period of economic downturn in the colony, as changes in British tariff policy had led to an economic depression in New Brunswick. As a result, tensions rose between the existing residents of New Brunswick, who were largely Protestant, and the newly arrived Irish immigrants, who were largely Catholic. The tensions, while both economic and religious, were also ethnic, as many of the Irish Protestants of New Brunswick were descendants of English Anglicans and Scottish Presbyterians who had settled Ireland. Conflict between Catholics and Protestants in the colony was reported as early as 1838 and primarily occurred throughout the 1840s in Saint John. In 1847, reflecting the anti-immigrant sentiment of the time, a government official wrote to Lieutenant Governor William Colebrooke saying that Irish immigrants should not be sent up the Saint John River from Fredericton because no employer in the region would hire them.

=== Orange Order ===
Both Catholics and Protestants formed organizations in the colony, with the most notable being the Protestant Orange Order. The Orange Order had originally been established in Ireland in 1795 with the aim to support Protestant societal domination in both the United Kingdom and its colonies, such as New Brunswick. By 1844, there were 27 local Orange Order lodges in the colony. The biggest annual event for the Orange Order was The Twelfth, a celebration held on July 12. The holiday marked the 1690 victory of Protestant King William of Orange over the Catholic King James II at the Battle of the Boyne in Ireland. On The Twelfth, members of the Orange Order—"Orangemen"—conducted marches through Catholic neighbourhoods in a show of Protestant dominance. As a slight towards the Orange Order, some Catholics erected green arches along the procession path which the Orangemen would have to walk under. These arches became the site of several physical confrontations between Catholics and Protestants during The Twelfth ceremonies.

In 1846, a lodge was established in Woodstock that had 110 members and was led by businessman and politician Charles Connell. This was the first lodge established in Carleton County. For The Twelfth celebrations in 1847, the Orange Order of Woodstock planned for a round-trip march from a building in Woodstock to a Baptist church in nearby Jacksontown, roughly 3 miles (4.8 km) away. This would be the Woodstock lodge's first public procession. In response, Irish Catholics in Woodstock made plans for a counterdemonstration. On April 21, a member of the lodge was attacked by several Catholics after publicly announcing plans for the march, and the following month, a quarrel occurred at a pub between Catholics and Protestants. In response, municipal officials petitioned the colonial government at Fredericton for more troops to keep the peace, though Lieutenant Governor Colebrooke denied these requests. Instead, he recommended that Woodstock's sheriff, John Winslow, organize a meeting of the local magistrates and attempt to defuse the tension. However, the magistrates declined the meeting, with Winslow believing that they were sympathetic to the Orange Order and did not want to risk interfering with the planned march. By July 11, supporters of both the Catholics and Protestants in Woodstock gathered in the town in preparation for the demonstration and counterdemonstration. Many of the individuals on both sides were armed. That evening, a group of four Catholic leaders met with a local priest who warned them against the counterdemonstration, though it does not appear that the leaders acted on this advice.

== Riot ==
By 9 a.m. on July 12, armed officials had been stationed throughout Woodstock in preparation for the day's events. Members of the Orange Order came out of their lodge building about an hour later and commenced their march. Approximately 200 to 300 men, most bearing arms, engaged in the military-style march to the Baptist church in Jacksontown, where they listened to a sermon. As part of their procession, they marched through a largely Catholic section of Woodstock. While the Orangemen were out of Woodstock, the Catholics, also numbering roughly between 200 and 300, held their own processions through the town. According to local author William Teel Baird, this Catholic group was made up primarily of individuals from the United States. Following their processions, they then proceeded north of the town and stationed themselves along a road, awaiting the Orange Order's return.

Five magistrates followed the Catholics. Of these five, three were leaders of the Orange Order, including Connell. Additionally, Sheriff Winslow brought a garrison of sixteen British military members. The officials told the Catholics that it was illegal to conduct marches and openly carry arms in town. However, the Catholic crowd argued that the magistrates had just allowed the Orange Order to do so, and subsequently a compromise was reached where the Catholic crowd would disperse and the magistrates would order the Orange Order to relinquish their arms and cease marching before returning to Woodstock. The Orange Order was alerted to this while in Jacksontown. As a result, prior to their return to Woodstock, they stashed their weapons in a wagon that would follow the group.

About an hour after they had returned to town, the Catholic group reconvened and, equipped with weapons, stationed themselves on a hill overlooking the road leading to Woodstock from Jacksontown. Authorities approached the group and read them the Riot Act. Magistrates also read the Riot Act to the Orange Order, though after they saw the Catholic group, they requested permission from the magistrates to arm themselves. The request was denied, but, in defiance of the law, they armed themselves anyways with weapons from the trailing wagon. They then proceeded to march until they were directly in front of the Catholic group. This meeting occurred outside of Woodstock's town boundary on Jacksontown Road. The two groups stationed themselves roughly 50 yards (46 metres) from each other, while British soldiers were stationed about 200 yards (180 m) from the Catholic group.

According to eyewitnesses who were sympathetic to the Orange Order, the Catholics had been the first to open fire. According to historian Scott W. See, it is unclear if the initial firing occurred as volley fire or as a single shot from one of the members of the group. However, following this initial gunfire, the Orange Order returned fire and launched an assault on the Catholics. Per See, the Catholic group erupted into chaos as the Orange Order charged the hill, with many breaking ranks and fleeing. The Orange Order was better equipped than the Catholics, and in the ensuing disorder, several Orangemen chased down fleeing Catholics on horseback, attacking them with bayonets. Some escaped into the woods north of Woodstock, while others escaped across a log jam on the Meduxnekeag River. Several were later reported to have been spotted in Houlton, Maine. While several hundred shots were fired during the riot, the British troops never fired. By afternoon, most of the violence had subsided, with only occasional outbreaks of skirmishing. Ultimately, the Orange Order, the British troops, and civilian law enforcement officials acted in concert to capture several dozen Catholics, who were held under arrest in Woodstock.

=== Casualties ===
According to historian Dan Soucoup, the shootout between the two groups resulted in death of up to ten Catholics. However, in a 1991 article on the strike published in Acadiensis, See argued that there may have been an underreporting of injuries and casualties on the Protestant side, given that almost all of the accounts of the riot came from sources either directly affiliated with or supportive of the Orange Order. Additionally, See said that initial reports indicated only a few injured, which in subsequent reports increased into several scores.

== Aftermath ==
=== Arrests ===
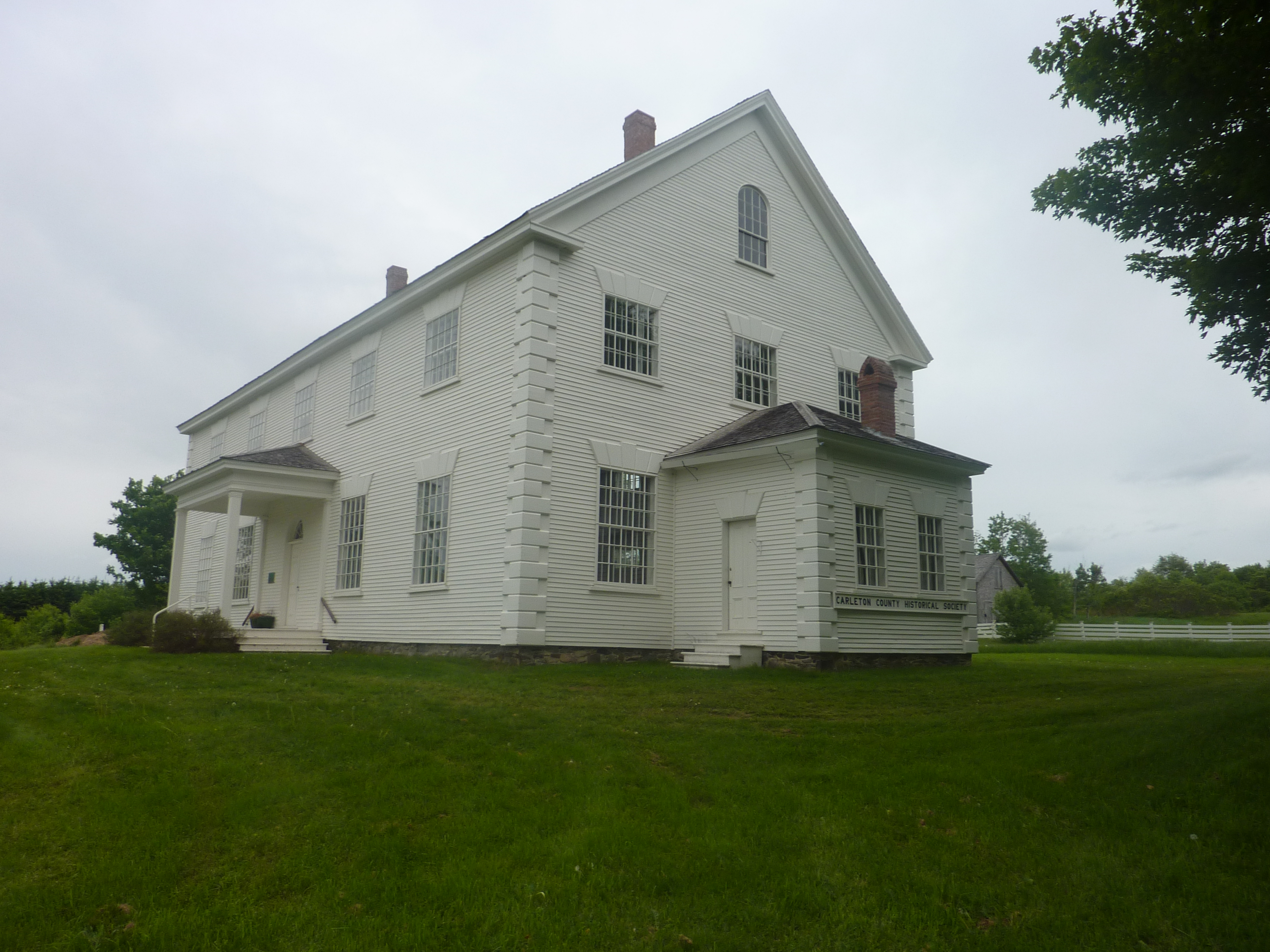
Individuals arrested in connection with the riot were held in the top floor of the Carleton County Court House (pictured 2012).

Following the riot, Sheriff Winslow swore in several dozen individuals into his constabulary, eventually swelling to include 112 Protestants. Additionally, about 150 rifles were dispersed by the magistrates to Protestants in town, many of which ending up in the hands of Orangemen. The constables conducted searches through Catholic residential areas for suspects from the riot, and by July 14, 66 individuals had been arrested. Most were arrested based on information provided by the Orange Order. Because the Carleton County jail had been destroyed in an 1845 fire and was awaiting reconstruction, Sheriff Winslow commandeered the top floor of the Carleton County Court House to hold the prisoners. By July 16, the number of arrested had grown to 73. As a result of the large number of arrested, Protestants in Woodstock became fearful that non-arrested Catholics would attempt an attack on the courthouse to free the prisoners. By September, a total of 91 people had been arrested, all Irish Catholics.

No Orangeman was arrested in connection with the July 12 riot, and several Orangemen were members of the town's judicial system. Additionally, a special committee appointed by Lieutenant Governor Colebrooke's executive council to investigate the riot and collect testimony was headed by men who were either Orangemen or were publicly sympathetic to the Orange Order.

=== Later events ===
On July 14, in response to requests from the local magistrates for military reinforcements, 21 soldiers that had been dispatched by Colebrooke arrived in Woodstock. Because Colebrooke and his executive council were fearful of direct conflict between the military and Catholics, the soldiers were given instructions that their presence would be largely symbolic and that they should only use force as a measure of last resort. The soldiers were recalled to Fredericton after several months of inactivity on October 19.

Following the riots, sporadic incidents of violence occurred in Woodstock that apparently stemmed from Catholic–Protestant tensions. On July 21, an Orangeman who had been involved in the riot was shot by an unidentified attacker. Additionally, several buildings, including a barn, a gristmill, and a kiln, that were owned by Protestants were destroyed in acts of arson. While several Protestants in Woodstock accused Catholics of the crimes, law enforcement officials were never able to identify the culprits.

== Trial ==
The trial began on September 8, 1847, with true bills issued against 88 of the arrested. Robert Parker and George F. Street served as the presiding judges, while George Botsford and New Brunswick Solicitor General William Boyd Kinnear served as the prosecutors. The defence's legal team consisted of W. J. Ritchie and Lemuel Allan Wilmot, who were assisted by B. C. Friel and Charles Watters. In order to hasten the trial and hinder the defence's ability to individually challenge the jurors, Kinnear decided to reduce the normally assigned felony charge for rioting to a misdemeanor charge. Entering the trial, all of the defendants pleaded not guilty.

=== Postponements ===
Ritchie argued that Sheriff Winslow had engaged in discrimination by purposefully excluding Catholics from the jury. Additionally, the list of potential jurors had been organized in violation of New Brunswick laws. Per Ritchie, the juror list had been hastily assembled shortly before the trial, whereas the law mandated that lists of jurors be produced by May 1. After several days of discussion, Judge Parker agreed to postpone the trial until January in order to fix the latter issue. However, concerning the former, Parker stated that the jury would be considered valid so long as it excluded both Catholics and Orangemen. However, no prohibition against Protestants was issued.

The trial adjourned on September 20, but not before additional charges of rioting were levied against several other Catholics, bringing the total number of defendants to 139, all Irish Catholics. Of these individuals, 115 were residents of Carleton County, while the remainder were either itinerant workers or lived in either a neighbouring county or the United States. While Friel had attempted to indict several Orangemen for their role in the riot, the jury dismissed the charges. In the interim, all prisoners were released on bail on their recognizance, which had been promoted by the court in part to avoid the costs of a lengthy incarceration for the accused. In 1848, the trial was postponed yet again until June 29 due to the death of New Brunswick Attorney General Charles Jeffery Peters.

=== Pro-Orange Order activities in the interim ===
Following the riot, the Orange Order experienced significant growth, due in part to fears of Irish Catholic insurrection. In Carleton County, within a year of the riot, twelve Orange lodges were established throughout Carleton County, with a total membership of roughly 1,200. In October 1847, a newly-constructed lodge was dedicated on the site of the riot, at the intersection of Boyne Street and Victoria Street. (Note: According to historian Scott W. See, this structure was still standing in 1991 and was officially called the "Loyal Orange Lodge #38".) The cornerstone-laying ceremony was attended by about 500 residents of Carleton County. On June 1, 1848, about 200 Orangemen participated in a march through Woodstock to celebrate the opening of a new lodge. Participating were three magistrates, including George Cleary, who at the time was still acting as a special commissioner for the trial. Lieutenant Governor Edmund Walker Head chastised the magistrates but did not remove Cleary from his position.

Prior to the resumption of the trial, several Orangemen and Orange Order sympathizers petitioned Lieutenant Governor Head to send military reinforcements to prevent any possible Catholic unrest in Woodstock. Head obliged, sending a detachment to the town with orders similar to those given to the soldiers dispatched in July 1847. Additionally, in June 1848, the Orange Order announced plans for two weeks of celebrations that would occur simultaneously to the trial and culminate with a large procession that would take place on the anniversary of the riot.

=== Resumption of the trial ===
In late June 1848, 57 defendants appeared before a special commission and discovered that the new jury was similar in composition to the original jury, omitting any Catholics and only including residents of Woodstock and the surrounding area. The defendants petitioned Head to have Winslow assemble a new jury, which Head agreed to. As a result, the trial was postponed again until July 11. Because the new date was one day before the planned Orange procession, the defendants again petitioned Head to reschedule the trial to late July or August, though Head denied this request.

On July 11, charges were read to the accused. Only 49 of the accused appeared at the trial, with the remainder failing to appear. By this time, the defence had replaced Ritchie and Wilmot with John Ambrose Street of Northumberland County. The defence immediately appealed to postpone the trial, though Judge Parker denied the request. The court quickly went through its docket, and on July 20, Parker dismissed the jury, which had consisted entirely of Protestants. By this time, of the 49 defendants who had stood trial, 35 had been convicted. (Note: The number of defendants found guilty comes from a 1991 article by historian Scott W. See published in the academic journal Acadiensis, in which he cites several contemporary newspapers from New Brunswick. However, in a 2010 book on New Brunswick history, historian Edward A. Whitcomb stated that the jury "found guilty 34 of the 39 Catholics who had been charged". Additionally, historian W. S. MacNutt noted in a 1963 history book of New Brunswick that "[t]hirty-four of forty-nine accused were sentenced and imprisoned".) Of these, 28 were found guilty of unlawful assembly and were given sentences of between one and six months in the county jail, while seven were found guilty of rioting and were given sentences of hard labour in the colony's penitentiary of between four months and one year.

=== Aftermath ===
The prosecution stated that many of the accused who did not appear for trial had been responsible for the more serious crimes committed during the riot and had absconded to either the United States or another part of the British Commonwealth. Kinnear began to collect bonds from the co-signers of the accused who had not appeared. However, in October 1848, Head, responding to petitions from Irish Catholics in the area, suspended the collections of outstanding debts related to the case. By late 1848, a few accused individuals had been tracked to the United States, but none were ever extradited. In March 1849, Head signed an executive order releasing the five prisoners who were still serving their sentences. This was in response to further petitions from the Irish Catholic community and marked one of the last official acts in relation to the trial.

== Legacy ==
The Woodstock riot received substantial coverage throughout New Brunswick. Discussing the riot in 1999, Canadian writer Dan Soucoup called it "one of New Brunswick's worst ethnic confrontations". On the same day, both Fredericton and Saint John experienced similar riots, though neither were as large as the Woodstock unrest. The riots in both cities resulted in one casualty each, and in Saint John, military members were called in to maintain the peace. In 1849, celebrations of the Twelfth in Saint John resulted in a dozen deaths and the convictions of both Catholic and Protestant rioters.

As a result of the riot, the Orange Order experienced substantial growth in Carleton County, which became a stronghold for the organization in New Brunswick. According to See, the riot also demonstrated to the Orange Order the benefit of more confrontational tactics against Catholics, as in the aftermath of the unrest, Protestants in the county viewed the Orangemen as maintainers of law and order instead of equal participants in the bloodshed. Regarding the impact of the riot on Irish Catholics in the area, See said that it "underscored the second-class citizenship" they experienced in the "Loyalist and Protestant-dominated region". In the aftermath of the riot and subsequent trial, many of those who had been convicted suffered a loss of property and increased discrimination.

== See also ==
- List of ethnic riots
- List of incidents of civil unrest in Canada
- Religious violence

== Sources ==
- Baird, William T. (1890). "Orange Riot of 1847". Seventy Years of New Brunswick Life: Autobiographical Sketches. Saint John, New Brunswick: Press of Geo. E. Day. pp. 156–162. OCLC 52059973.
- MacNutt, W. S. (1984) [1963]. New Brunswick: A History: 1784–1867 (Paperback ed.). Toronto: Macmillan of Canada. ISBN 978-0-7715-9818-0. OCLC 251765411.
- Punch, Terrence M. (2009). "Irish Rioters at Woodstock, New Brunswick, 1847". Erin's Sons: Irish Arrivals in Atlantic Canada, 1751–1858. Vol. III. Baltimore: Genealogical Publishing Company. pp. 137–139. ISBN 978-0-8063-1805-9. LCCN 2009931211. OCLC 455507350.
- See, Scott W. (Autumn 1991). ""Mickeys and Demons" vs. "Bigots and Boobies": The Woodstock Riot of 1847". Acadiensis. XXI (1). Fredericton: University of New Brunswick: 110–131. ISSN 0044-5851. LCCN 92641132. OCLC 316257829.
- Soucoup, Dan (1997). "1847: The Woodstock Riot". Historic New Brunswick. Lawrencetown Beach, Nova Scotia: Pottersfield Press. pp. 120–121. ISBN 978-1-895900-09-5. OCLC 39108876.
- Soucoup, Dan (1999). The Maritime Book of Days. Lawrencetown Beach, Nova Scotia: Pottersfield Press. ISBN 978-1-895900-26-2. OCLC 45002310.
- Whitcomb, Edward A. (2010). A Short History of New Brunswick. Ottawa: From Sea to Sea Enterprises. ISBN 978-0-9865967-0-4. OCLC 608946108.
