= Marie Nightingale =

Canadian cookbook writer (1928–2014)

Marie Nightingale (1928–15 March 2014) was a Canadian cookbook writer from Nova Scotia, best known for her 1970 cookbook Out of Old Nova Scotia Kitchens.

== Biography ==
Marie Nightingale was born in Halifax, Nova Scotia, in 1928, to parents Raymond and Violette Johnston (née Loner). Before she began writing, she worked in radio as a women's commentator on CHNS and CJCH in Halifax and CFAB in Windsor.

Nightingale's Out of Old Nova Scotia Kitchens, first published in 1970, has sold more copies than any other Nova Scotian cookbook. The 40th edition of the book was published in 2010. The book's popularity provided Nightingale opportunities as a food columnist, and she had a long and celebrated career writing for The Chronicle Herald and the Mail-Star. She was the founding food editor for Saltscapes Magazine.

Following the success of Out of Old Nova Scotia Kitchens, Nightingale wrote three more cookbooks across her career: Marie Nightingale's Favourite Recipes (1993), Out of Nova Scotia Gardens (1997), and Cooking with Friends (2003).

Nightingale died from cancer on 15 March 2014, at the age of 85.

== Publications ==
- Nightingale, Marie (1969). The History of the Children's Hospital. Halifax, N.S.: [s.n.]
- — (1970). Out of Old Nova Scotia Kitchens. Halifax, N.S.: Cystic Fibrosis Society of Nova Scotia. OCLC 606062419.
- — (1993). Marie Nightingale's Favourite Recipes. Halifax, N.S.: Nimbus Publishing. ISBN 1-5510-9022-8.
- — (1997). Out of Nova Scotia Gardens. Halifax, N.S.: Nimbus Publishing. ISBN 1-5510-9218-2.
- — (2003). Cooking with Friends. Halifax, N.S.: Nimbus Publishing. ISBN 1-5510-9467-3.
- — (2012). Out of Old Nova Scotia Kitchens (Revised ed.). Halifax, N.S.: Nimbus Publishing. ISBN 978-1-5510-9914-9.

== Recognition ==
- Edna Staebler Lifetime Achievement Award (1998), conferred by Cuisine Canada
- Taste Canada Hall of Fame (2011)
- Canadian Food Hero Award (2013), conferred by Slow Food Canada

== See also ==
- List of Canadian cookbook writers
- List of writers from Nova Scotia
