= Bras d'Or Yacht Club =

Canadian yacht club

- Burgee
- Short name: BYC
- Founded: July 26, 1904; 120 years ago
- Location: Baddeck, Nova Scotia
- Commodore: Peter Patterson
- Website: www.brasdoryachtclub.com

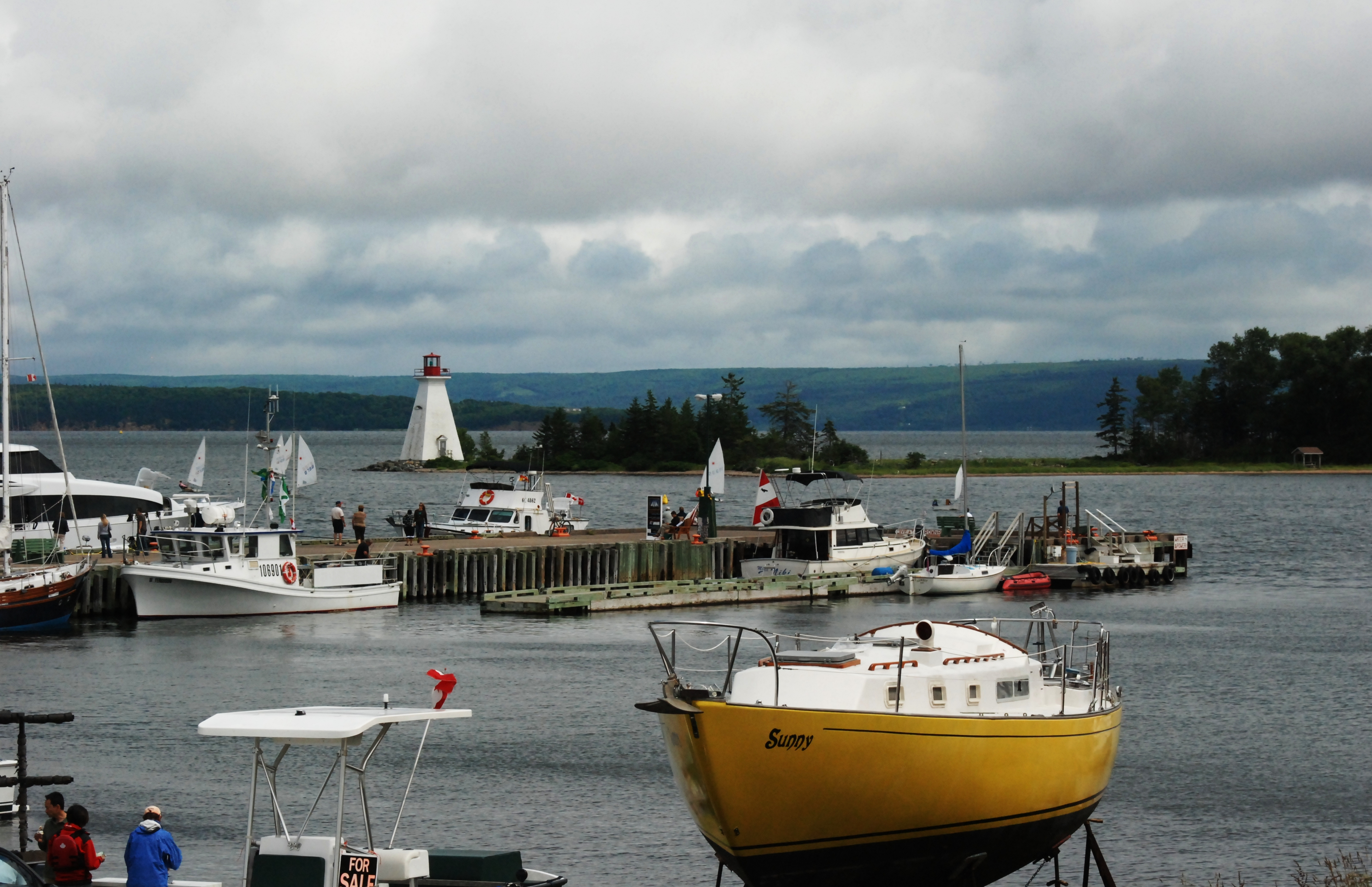
Boats in the Baddeck Harbour

The Bras d'Or Yacht Club is a yacht club in Baddeck, Nova Scotia. It is located on its namesake body of water, the Bras d'Or Lakes. The club was founded in 1904. Among its founding members were Gilbert Hovey Grosvenor, H. Percy Blanchard and Arthur Williams McCurdy. The clubhouse was constructed in 1913. Longtime member J.A. McCurdy, while serving as Lieutenant Governor of Nova Scotia, donated the McCurdy Cup to the club. This cup serves as the club championship. Alexander Graham Bell frequently attended club functions and even composed a song about it.

== Notable events ==
- Regatta Week -- Annual event since 1913
- Canadian Snipe Championships -- 1954, 1965
- OK Dinghy Championships -- 1977
- National Laser Open -- 1979
- National Laser Open Women -- 1982
- Hobie Nationals -- 1987, 1992

== Notable members ==
- Gilbert Hovey Grosvenor
- Arthur Williams McCurdy
- H. Percy Blanchard
- J.A. McCurdy
- Casey Baldwin
- Thomas Selfridge
- Mabel Bell
