= Sojourner: The Women's Forum =

American feminist periodical from 1975 until 2002

Sojourner
- Frequency: Monthly
- Format: Newspaper
- Publisher: Sojourner, Inc.
- First issue: September 1, 1975
- Final issue: 2002
- Based in: Cambridge, Massachusetts
- ISSN: 0191-8699
- OCLC: 4656277

Sojourner: The Women's Forum was an American feminist periodical published in Cambridge, Massachusetts from 1975 until 2002. Started by a women's group from MIT, the newspaper initially aimed to provide a space for just MIT women to communicate their "ideas, their art, talents, and skills, as well as their needs as women, to the rest of the community."

As the publication expanded, so did its audience. Sojourner eventually grew to be one of the most prominent feminist news publications in the nation. It published news, articles, and reviews concerning the feminist movement. The periodical published the works of many well known contemporary feminists including Audre Lorde, Barbara Smith, Margaret Robinson, Paula Gunn Allen, Joan Nestle, and Sonia Shah. Visual artist Isa Leshko was a contributing writer, Books Editor and News Editor from 1995 to 1997. Feminist writer Jennifer Pozner began her career at Sojourner.

After publishing over 185 issues, Sojourner gained similar prominence to contemporary popular publications such as HERESIES and Sinister Wisdom. Sojourner, like many other of its kind, struggled with finances and ultimately ceased publication due to lack of funding by 2002.

== Stance and mandate ==
The collective aimed to serve the feminist community, regardless of sex or gender, by inviting all feminists to engage with one another on a platform which expanded the network of feminist information exchange from 1975 and beyond. Despite this inclusive partial position, the contents of the newspaper did not feature literature about or by men. In line with the newspapers inclusive position, staff assured readers that Sojourner did not subscribe to any one feminist stance and was open to any and all discourse as long as it was productive to the charge of feminism in general.

== Editorial content ==
Printed in a newspaper format, the forum developed an extensive communications network between readers alike. Particularly in the Letters section of the paper, where philosophical arguments and critiques would often take place between women on topics and ideas pertaining to feminism, prejudice, homosexuality, patriarchy, and more. Often front pages would develop nuanced discourse about feminist and queer theory and strategy.

Advertisements were situated at the ends of pages or sections, almost exclusively promoting services, events, products, etc. made by or for women.

Viewpoints was a section that published essays and opinion pieces about a wide range of topics generally aligned with social, political and cultural issues from a feminist perspective.

News Briefs provided short-form columns highlighting domestic and international affairs.

Interviews and longer format essays would cover subjects such as women living with AIDS, Palestine, prostitution, and more.

The Calendar would provide information on upcoming events in Boston and beyond.

Boston Briefs and Boston Women's Resources provided local news coverage and access to resources for women.

Fiction, Film, Poetry, Theater and Books by women would all be featured in the next sections just before Sojourner's Women-Owned Business Directory and Classifieds sections.

== Front Line Feminism, 1975-1995: Essays from Sojourner's First 20 Years ==
In 1995, Sojourner, Incorporated released an anthology of essays that were featured in the newspaper, published through aunt lute books San Francisco. Edited by Karen Kahn, with a foreword by Robin Morgan, the book features articles spanning 8 chapters. Front Line Feminism covers much of the women's movements primary concerns with numerous, interdisciplinary articles, written by well known and unknown women writers alike.

=== Chapters ===
- Chapter 1: Claiming our Identities
- Chapter 2: Economic Injustice
- Chapter 3: The Politics of the Family
- Chapter 4: Reproductive Freedom
- Chapter 5: Women's Health
- Chapter 6: Sex and Sexuality
- Chapter 7: Violence Against Women
- Chapter 8: Building an Inclusive Movement

=== Contributors/credits ===
Karen Kahn	Editor
Robin Morgan	Foreword
Marilyn Humphries, Ellen Shub	Cover Photos
Pamela Wilson Design Studio	Typesetting
Joan Pinkvoss	Senior Editor
Vita Iskandar	Books Editor
Christine Lymbertos	Managing Editor
Cristina Azocar, JeeYeun Lee, Kerstin Carson, Dolissa Medina, Heather Lee, Kathleen Wilkinson	Production
Denise Conca, Tricia Lambie, Jonna K. Eagle, Melissa Levin, Jamie Lee Evans, Norma Torres	Production Support
Adrienne Rich, Ann Russo, Amber Hollibaugh, Angela Davis, Asoka Bandarage, Audre Lorde, Barbara Macdonald, Barbara Smith, Byllye Avery, Camille Motta, Carly Lund, Carole Ann Fer, Carol Sklar, Catharine Houser, Cathy Wasserman, Charon Asetoyer, Cheryl Clarke, Charlotte Bunch, Cheng Imm Tan, Cindy Patton, Demita Frazier, Delia D. Aguilar, Dion Farquhar, Elaine Bell Kaplan, Ellen Herman, Ellen Samuels, Evelyn C. White, Eva Young, Fran Froehlich, Gail Sullivan, Gloria Melnitsky, Gloria Z. Greenfield, Harneen Chernow, Irena Klepfisz, J. Kay, Jayme Ryan, Jezra Kaye, Joanna Kadi, Johanna Brenner, Joni Seager, Judith Barrington, Judith E. Beckett, Judith Herman, Judith Mazza, Judith McDaniel, Judith Stein, Judith Vincent, Julia Mines, Julia Penelope, Karen Kahn, Karen Lindsey, Karen Schneiderman, Kate Huard, Kate Millett, Kathi Maio, Katy Abel, Kip Tiernan, Laura Briggs, Linda Quint Freeman, Linda Wong, Lisa Leghorn, Loretta Ross, Lyri Merill, Lynn Goods, Mab Segrest, Margaret Robison, Marlene Gerber Fried, Marsha Saxton, Mary Frances Platt, Melanie Kaye/Kantrowitz, Mi Ok Bruining, Mimsi Dorwart, Margo St. James, Molly Lovelock, Monica Edelman, Nachama Wilker, Neta C. Crawford, Pam Mitchell, Pat Gowens, Patti Capel Swartz, Paula Gunn Allen, Rachel Lanzerotti, Randy Albelda, Rebecca Johnson, Rebecca Ratcliff, Rita Arditti, Roberta James, Robin Morgan, Roxana Pastor, Sabrina Sojourner, Sandra Antoinette Jaska, Sharon Cox, Sharon Gonsalves, Sonia Shah, Susan Eisenberg, Susan Moir, Susan Shapiro, Suzanne Pharr, Terri Richards, Tori Joseph, Tracey Rogers, Tracy McDonald.	Essay Authors
