= Robert Thacker =

Robert Thacker may refer to:

- Robert J. Thacker, Canadian professor and astronomer
- Robert E. Thacker (1918–2020), United States Air Force test pilot
