= Lesley Crewe =

Canadian writer

- Born: 27 June 1955 (age 71); Montreal, Quebec, Canada
- Education: Concordia University
- Occupation: Writer
- Writing career
- Genre: Fiction
- Notable awards: Dartmouth Book Award (2021)
- Website: www.lesleycrewe.com

Signature
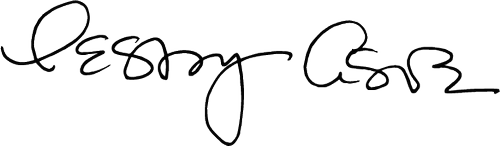

Lesley Crewe (born 27 June 1955) is a Canadian writer based in Nova Scotia. She published her first book, Relative Happiness, in 2005. The book was later adapted into a feature-length film, which premiered at the Carlton Cinema in Toronto in 2015. Crewe was the winner of the 2021 Jim Connors Dartmouth Book Award at the Atlantic Book Awards for her 2020 novel The Spoon Stealer, which was also longlisted for Canada Reads in 2022.

== Early life and education ==
Crewe was born on 27 June 1955 in Montreal, Quebec. She graduated from Concordia University with a degree in English and education. As a child, Crewe's mother took her to Cape Breton for two months every summer, which inspired her desire to live there.

== Career ==
Crewe began writing when she was 50 years old. Her first published novel, Relative Happiness (2005), follows a 30-year-old woman seeking romance in Cape Breton. The book was adapted for film in 2015, premiering at the Carlton Cinema in Toronto. Crewe wrote the initial two drafts of the screenplay. The film was directed by Deanne Foley.

Her second novel, Shoot Me (2006), follows a recently divorced social worker and her household, including her two adult daughters, sister, and ex-husband. The household becomes chaotic when the protagonist's 91-year-old aunt writes a letter to her informing her that she is returning to live the final days of her life in the house, and is convinced of treasure hidden within it. The book was not well-received by critics, being described in Quill & Quire as "read[ing] like a genre-writing class project gone wrong".

Her fourth novel, Hit & Mrs (2009), follows a group of four friends from Montreal who visit New York City for their 40th birthdays. The story takes a dark turn when a member of the group accidentally swaps luggage with a diamond smuggler at LaGuardia Airport, leading her to later kill an organized crime member using pepper spray. The book was praised for its humour and fast-paced plot. Hit & Mrs was followed by Kin (2012), another novel set in Cape Breton; and Amazing Grace (2015), Crewe's eighth novel, which she promoted in a tour across Ontario and Western Canada.

Crewe's 2020 novel The Spoon Stealer was the winner of the 2021 Jim Connors Dartmouth Book Award at the Atlantic Book Awards, and was long listed for Canada Reads in 2022. Crewe's books are particularly popular in her home of Cape Breton, with The Spoon Stealer and others holding five out of 20 spots on the Cape Breton Regional Library's list of most borrowed books in 2024. Also included on the list is her 2022 book Nosy Parker, a novel about a young girl growing up in the Notre-Dame-de-Grace neighbourhood of Montreal in the 1960s. The book was praised for its balance of humour and emotion.

Crewe's 15th novel, Recipe for a Good Life (2023), is once again set in Cape Breton and was inspired by the summers she spent there as a child. The book follows a mystery writer from Montreal who struggles with her life in the city, and decides to move to Cape Breton. For the launch of Recipe for a Good Life, Crewe worked with the Sydney-based tea company Teamancy to create a custom tea blend referred to as "Crewe Brew", which was served at events held to promote the book.

Her next book, Death and Other Inconveniences (2024), follows a newly-widowed woman who is "stunned and furious" following the death of her husband, who choked on a ham sandwich while watching the Stanley Cup playoffs. Crewe went on a tour in the Maritimes to promote the launch of the book, including stops in Amherst and Sackville, New Brunswick.

== Publications ==
- Crewe, Lesley (2005). Relative Happiness. Halifax, NS: Vagrant Press. ISBN 978-1-5510-9549-3. OCLC 60834160.
- — (2006). Shoot Me. Halifax, NS: Vagrant Press. ISBN 978-1-5510-9588-2. OCLC 185095099.
- — (2008). Ava Comes Home. Halifax, NS: Nimbus Publishing. ISBN 978-1-7710-8964-7. OCLC 1232108490.
- — (2009). Hit and Mrs. Halifax, NS: Vagrant Press. ISBN 978-1-5510-9725-1. OCLC 364977606.
- — (2012). Kin. Halifax, NS: Vagrant Press. ISBN 978-1-5510-9922-4. OCLC 799130144.
- — (2015). Amazing Grace. Halifax, NS: Vagrant Press. ISBN 978-1-7747-1085-2. OCLC 1286373193.
- — (2016). Mary, Mary. Halifax, NS: Vagrant Press. ISBN 978-1-7710-8454-3. OCLC 1314057908.
- — (2018). Beholden. Halifax, NS: Vagrant Press. ISBN 978-1-7710-8657-8. OCLC 1055273162.
- — (2019). Are You Kidding Me?!: Chronicles of an Ordinary Life. Halifax, NS: Nimbus Publishing. ISBN 978-1-7710-8792-6. OCLC 1110581407.
- — (2020). The Spoon Stealer. Halifax, NS: Vagrant Press. ISBN 978-1-7710-8881-7. OCLC 1157287180.
- — (2021). Her Mother's Daughter. Halifax, NS: Vagrant Press. ISBN 978-1-7747-1032-6. OCLC 614855851.
- — (2021). I Kid You Not!: Chronicles of an Ordinary Family. Halifax, NS: Nimbus Publishing. ISBN 978-1-7747-1073-9. OCLC 1250392758.
- — (2022). Nosy Parker. Halifax, NS: Vagrant Press. ISBN 978-1-7747-1042-5. OCLC 1263743718.
- — (2023). Chloe Sparrow. Halifax, NS: Vagrant Press. ISBN 978-1-7747-1190-3. OCLC 1348636799.
- — (2023). Recipe for a Good Life. Halifax, NS: Nimbus Publishing. ISBN 978-1-7747-1204-7. OCLC 1404814600.
- — (2024). Death and Other Inconveniences. Halifax, NS: Vagrant Press. ISBN 978-1-7747-1279-5. OCLC 1393913508.
- — (2025). The Spirit of Scatarie. Halifax, NS: Vagrant Press. ISBN 978-1-7747-1456-0. OCLC 1515077501.

== Recognition ==
- Atlantic Book Awards: Winner of Jim Connors Dartmouth Book Award for Fiction for The Spoon Stealer (2021)
- Canada Reads longlist for The Spoon Stealer (2022)

== See also ==
- Literature of Nova Scotia
- List of writers from Nova Scotia
