= Joan Dawson =

Canadian writer

Joan Dawson is a Canadian writer and historian in Nova Scotia. Originally from London, England, she moved to Winnipeg in 1954, later settling in Halifax. She has written a variety of articles concerning maps and Nova Scotian history, as well as several books. She is a fellow of the Royal Nova Scotia Historical Society.

== Biography ==
Joan Dawson is from London, England. She met her husband while attending Oxford University, and moved with him to Winnipeg, Manitoba in 1954, where she taught French and ran a library in an independent girls' school. She later moved to Halifax, Nova Scotia, where she had two sons.

Dawson has written a wide variety of articles on the topics of maps and Nova Scotian history. She has published several books, among them The Mapmakers' Legacy in 2007, A History of Nova Scotia in 50 Objects in 2015, and Nova Scotia's Historic Inland Communities in 2022.

Dawson is a member of the Lunenburg County Historical Society and the Heritage Trust of Nova Scotia. She is a fellow of the Royal Nova Scotia Historical Society.

== Publications ==
- Dawson, Joan (1988). The Mapmaker's Eye: Nova Scotia Through Early Maps. Halifax, NS: Nimbus Publishing and Nova Scotia Museum. ISBN 0-921-05-4122. OCLC 30624538.
- — (2007). The Mapmakers' Legacy: Nineteenth-Century Nova Scotia Through Maps. Halifax, NS: Nimbus Publishing. ISBN 978-1-5510-9607-0. OCLC 77549900.
- — (2009). Nova Scotia's Lost Highways: The Early Roads That Shaped the Province. Halifax, NS: Nimbus Publishing. ISBN 978-1-5510-9732-9. OCLC 428868484.
- — (2012). Nova Scotia's Historic Rivers: The Waterways That Shaped the Province. Halifax, NS: Nimbus Publishing. ISBN 978-1-5510-9932-3. OCLC 798415593.
- — (2015). A History of Nova Scotia in 50 Objects. Halifax, NS: Nimbus Publishing. ISBN 978-1-7710-8295-2. OCLC 901995609.
- — (2018). Nova Scotia's Lost Communities: The Early Settlements That Helped Build the Province. Halifax, NS: Nimbus Publishing. ISBN 978-1-7710-8604-2. OCLC 1035246426.
- — (2020). Nova Scotia's Historic Harbours: The Seaports That Shaped the Province. Halifax, NS: Nimbus Publishing. ISBN 978-1-7710-8859-6. OCLC 1139556965.
- — (2022). Nova Scotia's Historic Inland Communities: The Gathering Places and Settlements That Shaped the Province. Halifax, NS: Nimbus Publishing. ISBN 978-1-7747-1079-1. OCLC 1286079973.
- — (2025). Nova Scotia's Historic Ferries: The Boats That Bridged the Province. Halifax, NS: Nimbus Publishing. ISBN 978-1-7747-1473-7. OCLC 1523260859.
