= Robert J. Thacker =

Canadian astronomer

- Education: University of Nottingham (BA); King's College London (MSc); University of Alberta (PhD)
- Known for: Past President of the Canadian Astronomical Society (CASCA); Science Outreach
- Awards: CASCA Qilak Award for Astronomy Communications, Public Education, and Outreach (2018)
- Scientific career
- Fields: Astronomy
- Institutions: Saint Mary's University
- Website: Personal website

Robert J. Thacker is a Canadian astronomer, professor in the Department of Astronomy and Physics at Saint Mary's University in Halifax, Nova Scotia, director of the Science Outreach Centre at Saint Mary’s, and Past President of the Canadian Astronomical Society (CASCA). He is also a board member of the Royal Astronomical Society of Canada.

== Education ==
Thacker received a Bachelor of Science in Mathematical Physics from the University of Nottingham in 1992. He went on to receive a Master of Science in mathematics from King's College London in 1993 and a PhD in physics from the University of Alberta in 1999.

== Career ==
Thacker uses computer simulations to study the large-scale structure of the Universe and galaxy formation.

=== Public engagement ===
Since championing the International year of Astronomy in 2009, Thacker has given numerous public lectures and has participated in over 350 media interviews and sciences programs.

Thacker co-hosted 46 episodes of the show Science Files on CJNI-FM in Halifax in 2016, and co-hosted an hour-long segment Science Files within The Rick Howe Show, after the original show was canceled. He is also the host of a weekly segment Sounds of Science on the CBC Radio Halifax program Mainstreet NS.

== Awards and recognition ==
Thacker held a Tier 2 Canada Research Chair in Astronomy and Astrophysics from 2007 - 2017.

He received the Nova Scotia "Science Champion" award from the Discovery Centre of Nova Scotia in 2015. In 2018, he received the Qilak Award for Astronomy Communications, Public Education, and Outreach from the Canadian Astronomical Society.
