= Renée Belliveau =

Canadian writer and archivist

- Born: Shediac, New Brunswick, Canada
- Education: Mount Allison University (BA); University of Waterloo (MA); University of Toronto (MI)
- Occupations: Writer, archivist
- Writing career
- Language: French, English
- Genres: Historical fiction, memoir
- Notable works: Les étoiles à l'aube (2012); The Sound of Fire (2021); A Sense of Things Beyond (2025)

Renée Belliveau is a Canadian writer and archivist from New Brunswick.

== Biography ==
Renée Belliveau is an Acadian author originally from Shediac, New Brunswick. She graduated from Mount Allison University with a Bachelor of Arts, followed by the University of Waterloo with a Master of Arts, and finally the University of Toronto with a Master of Information. She resides in Dartmouth, Nova Scotia, where she is employed as an archivist. Her 2012 French-language memoir Les étoiles à l'aube recounts her father's fight with cancer.

Belliveau draws inspiration for her writing from her archival work. Her first novel was The Sound of Fire (2021), a work of historical fiction set in New Brunswick which recalls a devastating fire at Mount Allison University in 1941. The novel was named a book of the year for 2021 by Quill & Quire and was shortlisted for the ReLit Novel Award. Her next novel, A Sense of Things Beyond (2025), is set in Nova Scotia in 1922 and follows the story of a couple rebuilding their lives in the aftermath of the First World War. The novel was inspired by real people; a nurse who served on the front lines, and a man who was imprisoned in a German internment camp. The novel was shortlisted for the Thomas Raddall Atlantic Fiction Award and the Dartmouth Book Award for Fiction in March 2026.

== Publications ==
- Belliveau, Renée (2012). Les étoiles à l'aube (in French). Caraquet, N.B.: Les Editions de la Francophonie. ISBN 978-2-8962-7311-9.
- — (2021). The Sound of Fire. Halifax, N.S.: Nimbus Publishing. ISBN 978-1-7747-1018-0.
- — (2025). A Sense of Things Beyond. Halifax, N.S.: Vagrant Press. ISBN 978-1-7747-1452-2.
