= Hélène Boudreau =

Canadian children's author and artist

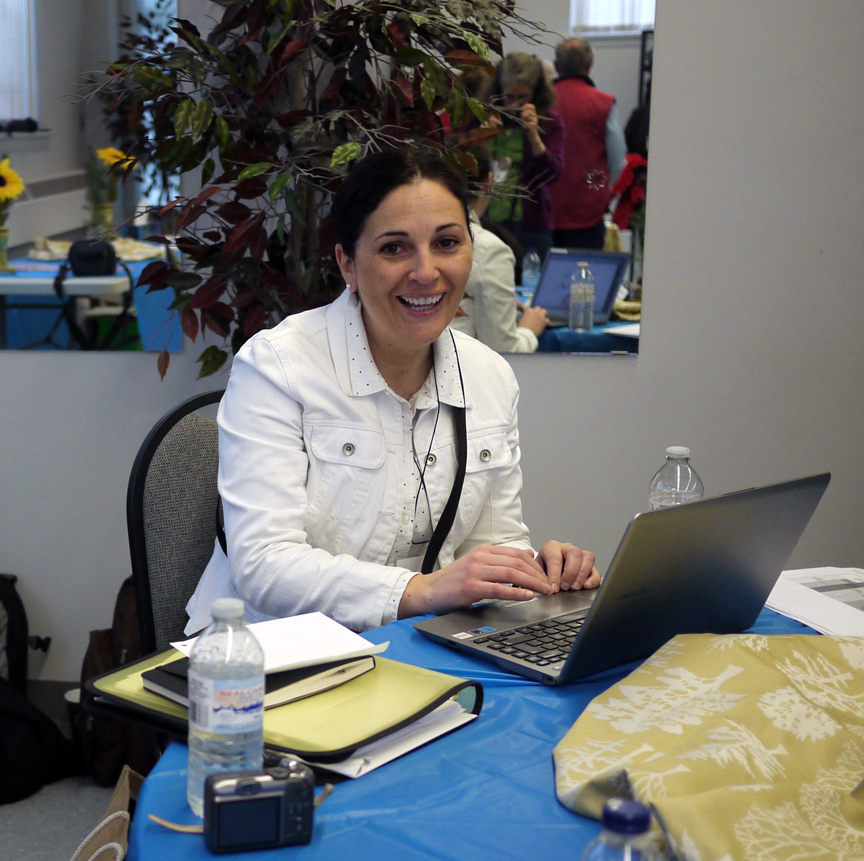
- Born: 16 June 1969 (age 57); Petit-de-Grat, Nova Scotia, Canada
- Occupations: Children's author, artist
- Writing career
- Period: Present
- Website: heleneboudreau.com

Hélène Boudreau (born June 19, 1969) is an Acadian artist and author of children's books, whose writing has appeared in various Canadian publications and her Maritime-themed art has been exhibited by the Toronto Public Library and other local vicinities.

== Early life ==
Hélène Boudreau was born and raised in Petit de Grat, Cape Breton, Nova Scotia, in a French Acadian community to parents of Acadian descent and can speak both English and French fluently. She grew up in a large family having had three brothers and four sisters. After graduating from Isle Madame District High School in 1987, Boudreau attended Dalhousie University where she earned a degree in biology and began working as a Park Interpreter for the Canadian Parks Service. Afterwards she began training as a Registered Respiratory Therapist at the Victoria General School of Allied Health. It wasn't until she was in her late twenties when she moved to Ontario from her Maritime hometown in order to begin her career as a children's author.

== Career ==
When asked what inspired Boudreau to become a children's author, she recalled:

I first thought of a being a children's author in 4th/5th grade when a teacher of mine published a picture book. It was very inspirational for me to see someone I knew accomplish such an unimaginable feat. That day, I went straight home and wrote and illustrated a picture book of my own but it wasn't until much later (almost thirty years) when I actually put that dream of being an author into action.

In 2007, Boudreau was short-listed in the Surrey International Writing Contest, in the "Writing For Young People" category for With Measured Breath: A YA short story. Shortly afterwards, Boudreau began working on her first book called Acadian Star after many years of having settled in Ontario. The novel was aimed at middle school children and tells the adventures of a young girl named Meg Gallant who takes part in a home town competition with her friend Neve, called the Acadian Star. It was published in 2008, by Nimbus Publishing and was soon nominated for the 2009/2010 Hackmatack Children's Choice Award. Acadian Star also took 2nd place in the 2008 Writers Federation of New Brunswick Literary Competition, at which time Boudreau began accumulating a local fan base among younger readers in Eastern Canada.

The year 2010 saw the publishing of two more novels of Boudreau's titled KEEP OUT!, by Nimbus Publishing and Real Mermaids Don't Wear Toe Rings, by Jabberwocky Publishing about "an aquaphobic mer-girl trying to balance the drama of two-legged teenage life with her quest to rescue her mermaid mother from really scary mer-dudes". The second was to become her best known book, a Crystal Kite Member Choice Finalist, and served as a prequel to Real Mermaids Don't Hold Their Breath (May, 2012) and Real Mermaids Don't Have Two Left Feet (February 2013). Ironically, Boudreau wrote most of her first novel in the Real Mermaids series, Real Mermaids Don't Wear Toe Rings, on her feet. An avid walker, she stated "I find when you're on the move, it helps your thoughts be on the move, too."

== Personal life ==
Boudreau married Gordon Clarke, a retired lieutenant and former President of the Royal Military Colleges Club of Canada. They have two daughters together, Charlotte and Marcelle. Although the family resides in Markham, Ontario, presently, Boudraeu's "birthplace [of Petit de Grat] greatly influences the themes of [her] writing for children." Boudreau is known to be "...a compulsive walker, a chicklet wrangler and a lover of cheese and cheap chocolate." Authors that inspire Boudreau include Madeleine L'Engle, Louis Sachar, Katherine Paterson and Kate DiCamillo. She is also an active member of The Writers' Union of Canada.

== Bibliography ==
=== Real Mermaids series ===
- Real Mermaids Don't Wear Toe Rings (Jabberwocky, 2010)
- Real Mermaids Don't Hold Their Breath (Jabberwocky, 2012)
- Real Mermaids Don't Need High Heels (Jabberwocky, 2013)
- Real Mermaids Don't Sell Seashells (Jabberwocky, 2013)

=== Red Dune Adventures series ===
- KEEP OUT! (Nimbus Publishing, 2010)
- Water Hazard (Nimbus Publishing, 2010)

=== Non-fiction ===
- Crimebusting and Detection (Crabtree Publishing, 2009)
- Swimming Science (Crabtree Publishing, 2009)
- Miraculous Medicines (Crabtree Publishing, 2009)
- Life In A Residential City (Crabtree Publishing, 2010)
- Life in a Fishing Community (Crabtree Publishing, 2010)

=== Other ===
- Acadian Star (Nimbus Publishing, 2008)
- I Dare You Not To Yawn (Candlewick, 2013)
- Evangeline (Nimbus Publishing, 2013)
