= Lorri Neilsen Glenn =

Canadian poet, ethnographer, essayist and educator

Lorri Neilsen Glenn is a Canadian poet, ethnographer, essayist and educator.

Born in Winnipeg (Treaty One), and raised on the Prairies, she moved to Nova Scotia in 1983. Neilsen Glenn is the author and editor of several books of creative nonfiction, poetry, literacy, ethnography, and essays (scholarly and literary). She was Poet Laureate for Halifax from 2005 to 2009, the first Métis to hold the position. Her writing focuses on women, arts-based research, and memoir/life stories; her work is known for its hybrid and lyrical approaches. She has published book reviews in national and international journals and newspapers. Neilsen Glenn has received awards for her poetry, creative nonfiction, teaching, scholarship and community work.

Neilsen Glenn is a professor emerita at Mount Saint Vincent University and has served as a mentor in the University of King's College MFA program in creative nonfiction since the program's inception

== Biography ==
Her first book of poetry, All the Perfect Disguises, winner of the Poet's Corner Award, was published in 2003. In 2007, a chapbook, Saved String (Rubicon Press) and the collection Combustion (Brick Books) were published. Neilsen Glenn published 'Lost Gospels' (Brick Books) in 2010. A collection of essays on poetry and loss, Threading Light, was published in 2011 by Hagios Press. The best-selling anthology of poetry and prose about mothers, "Untying the Apron: Daughters Remember Mothers of the 1950s" was published in 2013 by Guernica Editions.

Neilsen Glenn was appointed Poet Laureate for the Halifax Regional Municipality in 2005, a role she held through 2009. She lives in Halifax and has served as a juror for provincial, regional and national writing awards. Neilsen Glenn was President of the Writers' Federation of Nova Scotia from 2020 to 2021 and has served several terms on the WFNS board. She was awarded the Queen Elizabeth II Platinum Jubilee Medal in 2023 for her work in the arts.

Neilsen Glenn' poetry has won or has been shortlisted for the National Magazine Awards, Poets' Corner Award, Short Grain Contest, CBC Literary Awards, Bliss Carman Poetry Award, CV2 Poetry Contest, The Malahat Open Season Award, ReLit Award, among others. Her creative nonfiction has won awards in Grain, Event Magazine, and Prairie Fire. Among her honours are awards for research excellence and innovative teaching (Mount Saint Vincent University) and a Halifax Progress Club Women of Excellence award for her work in the arts.

Neilsen Glenn has taught writing (poetry, creative nonfiction (memoir, the lyric essay, life writing) across Canada, as well as in Ireland, Australia, Chile, and Greece. She has worked extensively with writers in all walks of life since 1983. She has served on juries for local, regional and national awards such as The Governor General's Award for Nonfiction and The Hilary Weston Prize for Nonfiction.

Neilsen Glenn's historical memoir in hybrid form, Following the River: Traces of Red River Women, compiles portraits of her Indigenous grandmothers and their contemporaries in 19th Century Rupertsland / Red River, Manitoba and was published by Wolsak and Wynn in Fall 2017. It won The Miramichi Reader's Best Nonfiction Award for 2018 and was short-listed for the Evelyn Richardson Award for Nonfiction. Her 2024 memoir, The Old Moon in Her Arms: Women I Have Known and Been was published by Nimbus Publishing and explores a long life in short prose pieces.

== Bibliography ==
- The Old Moon in Her Arms: Women I Have Known and Been , Nimbus Publishing, 2024
- Following the River: Traces of Red River Women, Wolsak and Wynn, 2017
- Untying the Apron: Daughters Remember Mothers of the 1950s, Guernica Editions, 2013
- Salt Lines (Editor, with Carsten Knox), Backalong Books, 2012
- Threading Light the former Hagios Press, 2011
- Lost Gospels, Brick Books, 2010
- The Art of Visual Inquiry (co-editor), Backalong Books, 2007
- Saved String, Rubicon Press, 2007
- Combustion, Brick Books, 2007
- Provoked by Art, (co-editor). Backalong Books, 2004
- All the Perfect Disguises, Broken Jaw, 2003
- The Art of Writing Inquiry, (lead editor). Backalong Books, 2001
- Knowing her Place, Caddo Gap, 1998
- A Stone in my Shoe: Literacy in Times of Change, Peguis Publishers, 1992
- Literacy and Living, Heinemann Books, 1989
