= Vernon Oickle =

Canadian writer

- Occupation: Writer; journalist
- Genres: Fiction; Non-fiction; Folklore
- Notable awards: Queen Elizabeth II Diamond Jubilee Medal (2012); Atlantic Journalism Hall of Fame (2020)

Vernon Oickle is a Canadian writer and journalist from Nova Scotia. Born in Liverpool, Oickle began his career in journalism at The Liverpool Advance. He was the recipient of the Queen Elizabeth II Diamond Jubilee Medal in 2012, and was inducted into the Atlantic Journalism Hall of Fame in 2020. Oickle has written extensively on regional folklore and ghost stories, publishing over 40 books across his career.

== Biography ==
Vernon Oickle was born in Liverpool, Nova Scotia. He graduated high school in 1979, subsequently moving to Lethbridge, Alberta, where he attended the Lethbridge Community College, graduating in 1982 with an honours diploma in journalism. After graduating, Oickle returned to Nova Scotia and began his career in journalism at The Liverpool Advance, where he was later appointed editor. After leaving The Advance in 1994, Oickle became the editor of The Bridgewater Bulletin and The Lunenburg County Progress Bulletin in Bridgewater, a position he held until 2014. He was the recipient of the 2013 Best Local Editorial Award from the Canadian Community Newspapers Association.

In 2012, Oickle was awarded the Queen Elizabeth II Diamond Jubilee Medal. The same year, he received the Golden Quill award presented by the International Society of Weekly Newspaper Editors, becoming the third Canadian to win the award. He was inducted into the Atlantic Journalism Hall of Fame in 2020.

Oickle has written extensively on regional folklore and ghost stories, publishing his 47th book in 2025. He was invited by Acadia Broadcasting to start a new column on YourSouthShore.ca in 2026, writing a monthly feature on Nova Scotian topics called In My Backyard.

== Publications ==
- Oickle, Vernon (1993). Jane Hurshmann-Corkum: Life and Death After Billy. Halifax, NS: Nimbus Publishing. ISBN 978-1-5510-9035-1. OCLC 499155271.
- — (1997). Busted: Nova Scotia's War on Drugs. Halifax, NS: Nimbus Publishing. ISBN 978-1-5510-9227-0. OCLC 37372198.
- — (1999). Queen's County. Bridgewater, NS: Lighthouse Publishing. ISBN 978-0-9683-8430-5. OCLC 43427422.
- — (2001). Ghost Stories of the Maritimes. Edmonton, AB: Lone Pine Publishing. ISBN 978-1-5510-5329-5. OCLC 46810061.
- — (2001). Dancing With The Dead. Saint John, NB: DreamCatcher. ISBN 978-1-8943-7212-1. OCLC 50623285.
- — (2007). Disasters of Atlantic Canada: Stories of Courage and Chaos. Edmonton, AB: Folklore Publishing. ISBN 978-1-8948-6415-2. OCLC 137231193.
- — (2008). Canada's Haunted Coast: True Ghost Stories of the Maritimes. Edmonton, AB: Ghost House Books. ISBN 978-1-5510-5598-5. OCLC 213525787.
- — (2010). One Crow Sorrow. Chester, NS: Bryler Publications. ISBN 978-0-9866-4252-4. OCLC 667805583.
- — (2010). Angels Here Among Us. Edmonton, AB: Folklore Publishing. ISBN 978-1-9266-7770-5. OCLC 1518340168.
- — (2011). Red Sky at Night. Lunenburg, NS: MacIntyre Purcell Publishing. ISBN 978-1-9269-1610-1. OCLC 726556394.
- — (2011). Two Crows Joy. Chester, NS: Bryler Publications. ISBN 978-1-9270-0315-2. OCLC 754318700.
- — (2012). Three Crows a Letter. Chester, NS: Bryler Publications. ISBN 978-1-9270-0334-3. OCLC 784293244.
- — (2012). Four Crows a Boy. Chester, NS: Bryler Publications. ISBN 978-1-9270-0387-9. OCLC 819846635.
- — (2013). Beaches of Lunenburg Queens. Lunenburg, NS: MacIntyre Purcell Publishing. ISBN 978-1-9270-9752-6. OCLC 1260819817.
- — (2014). Kiss the Cod: Superstitions, Traditions, Omens and Old Wives' Tales of Atlantic Canada. Edmonton, AB: Blue Bike Books. ISBN 978-1-9267-0062-5. OCLC 902919569.
- — (2014). Nova Scotia Outstanding Outhouse Reader. Lunenburg, NS: MacIntyre Purcell Publishing. ISBN 978-1-9270-9766-3. OCLC 883940122.
- — (2014). I'm Movin' On: The Life and Legacy of Hank Snow. Halifax, NS: Nimbus Publishing. ISBN 978-1-7710-8138-2. OCLC 867897485.
- — (2015). Red Coat Brigade. Lunenburg, NS: MacIntyre Purcell Publishing. ISBN 978-1-9270-9781-6. OCLC 907096220.
- — (2015). Ghost Stories of Nova Scotia. Lunenburg, NS: MacIntyre Purcell Publishing. ISBN 978-1-9270-9777-9. OCLC 910775754.
- — (2016). Newfoundland and Labrador Outstanding Outhouse Reader. Lunenburg, NS: MacIntyre Purcell Publishing. ISBN 978-1-7727-6012-5. OCLC 946215612.
- — (2016). Strange Nova Scotia. Lunenburg, NS: MacIntyre Purcell Publishing. ISBN 978-1-9270-9798-4. OCLC 941443737.
- — (2017). Where Evil Dwells: The Nova Scotia Anthology of Horror. Lunenburg, NS: MacIntyre Purcell Publishing. ISBN 978-1-7727-6075-0. OCLC 987578604.
- — (2017). Five Crows Silver. Lunenburg, NS: MacIntyre Purcell Publishing. ISBN 978-1-7727-6058-3. OCLC 967787973.
- — (2018). Bluenosers' Book of Slang. Lunenburg, NS: MacIntyre Purcell Publishing. ISBN 978-1-7727-6093-4. OCLC 1035246854.
- — (2018). The Nova Scotia Book of Lists. Lunenburg, NS: MacIntyre Purcell Publishing. ISBN 978-1-7727-6109-2. OCLC 1080219243.
- — (2019). More Ghost Stories of Nova Scotia. Lunenburg, NS: MacIntyre Purcell Publishing. ISBN 978-1-7727-6132-0. OCLC 1099277416.
- — (2019). We Love Nova Scotia: A People's Portrait. Lunenburg, NS: MacIntyre Purcell Publishing. ISBN 978-1-7727-6119-1. OCLC 1083348442.
- — (2020). Nova Scotia Outstanding Outhouse Reader #2. Lunenburg, NS: MacIntyre Purcell Publishing. ISBN 978-1-7727-6146-7. OCLC 1149392650.
- — (2022). Six Crows Gold. Granville Ferry, NS: Moose House Publications. ISBN 978-1-9901-8757-5. OCLC 1367237075.
- — (2023). Seven Crows a Secret Yet to be Told. Granville Ferry, NS: Moose House Publications. ISBN 978-1-9981-4920-9. OCLC 1426043251.
- — (2023). Forerunners: Harbingers of Death in Nova Scotia. Lunenburg, NS: MacIntyre Purcell Publishing. ISBN 978-1-7727-6179-5. OCLC 1382403113.
- — (2024). Eight Crows for a Wish. Granville Ferry, NS: Moose House Publications. ISBN 978-1-9981-4937-7. OCLC 1500187626.
- — (2024). Grandma's Home Remedies: A Collection of Tried-and-True Nova Scotian Cures. ISBN 978-1-7727-6181-8. OCLC 1423077042.
- — (2025). Nine Crows for a Kiss. Granville Ferry, NS: Moose House Publications. ISBN 978-1-9981-4981-0. OCLC 1516194714.
- — (2025). Even More Ghost Stories of Nova Scotia. Lunenburg, NS: MacIntyre Purcell Publishing. ISBN 978-1-7727-6192-4. OCLC 1517659348.
- — (2025). Ten Crows for a Time of Joyous Bliss. Granville Ferry, NS: Moose House Publications. ISBN 978-1-9978-2707-8.
