= Niki Jabbour =

Canadian vegetable gardener

Niki Jabbour is a Canadian vegetable gardener and horticulturalist from Nova Scotia. She is the author of four books on the subject of vegetable gardening.

== Biography ==
Niki Jabbour is based in Halifax, Nova Scotia. She graduated from Dalhousie University with a Bachelor of Arts in 1995, receiving a diploma in horticulture from the Nova Scotia Agricultural College the same year. Her first book about gardening, The Year-Round Vegetable Gardener, was published in 2011 and was very well-received, being awarded the 2012 American Horticultural Society Book Award. She hosted the popular radio show The Weekend Gardener on News 95.7 in Halifax, and is the garden expert for CBC Maritime Noon. Jabbour's writing has appeared in several magazines, such as Fine Gardening and Birds & Blooms.

Her 2018 book Niki Jabbour's Veggie Garden Remix was the winner of the 2019 American Horticultural Society Book Award, the 2019 Media Awards Gold Medal of Achievement, and the 2019 Taste Canada Silver Award for Culinary Narratives.

== Publications ==
- Jabbour, Niki (2011). The Year-Round Vegetable Gardener. North Adams, MA: Storey Publishing. ISBN 978-1-6034-2785-2.
- — (2014). Groundbreaking Food Gardens. North Adams, MA: Storey Publishing. ISBN 978-1-6034-2844-6.
- — (2018). Niki Jabbour's Veggie Garden Remix. North Adams, MA: Storey Publishing. ISBN 978-1-6121-2670-8.
- — (2020). Growing Under Cover. North Adams, MA: Storey Publishing. ISBN 978-1-6358-6132-7.

== See also ==
- List of writers from Nova Scotia
