= Jane Reisman =

Broadway lighting designer

Maritza Jane Reisman (March 25, 1937 - December 1, 2017), known as Jane Reisman, was an American lighting designer for Broadway, ballet and opera.

== Early life ==
Reisman's parents were Lillian Castleman and Leo Reisman, a violinist and big band leader. Reisman spent her childhood in Manhattan and Massachusetts and attended Vassar college with a degree in drama. She then moved to London to begin her career.

== Career ==
Reisman worked as a professional lighting designer beginning in 1963.

=== Work ===
Reisman designed the lighting for shows both on and off-Broadway as well as for ballet and opera companies around the world. Notable work includes designs for ABT, Rome Opera Ballet, and the Royal Winnipeg Ballet as well as over 50 opera productions. Reisman and her husband, Neil Peter Jampolis, collaborated on the Tony-nominated lighting design for the Broadway musical Black and Blue. They again teamed up on Forever Plaid a musical show along with the 2009 film adaptation on which Reisman designed the lighting and Neil designed the production. The show has been performed globally since originally opening in New York City in 1989.

=== Teaching ===
Reisman taught Lighting Design at Emerson College, Bennington College and UCLA. She also taught master classes at Banff for seven years.

=== Legacy ===
Reisman and her husband founded a trust in 2003 that stipulated their home on the shores of the Minas Basin to be left to a non-profit organization that would use it as a retreat for writers and artists. The cottage in Avonport, Nova Scotia was donated to the Writers' Federation of Nova Scotia fulfilling its intended purpose. Applications for self-directed and sponsored retreats are detailed on the Writers' Federation of Nova Scotia website.

== Notable productions ==
=== Broadway ===
WARP - Opened February 14, 1973

Me Jack, You Jill - Opened March 14, 1976

G.R. Point - Opened April 16, 1979

Black and Blue - Opened January 26, 1989

=== Off-Broadway ===
Shadow of Heroes - Opened December 5, 1961

Breakfast Conversations in Miami - January 1984

A Breaking the Prairie Wolf Code - Opened November 13, 1985

Faith, Hope and Charity - Opened December 1988

Forever Plaid - Opened May 20, 1990

Tale of Two Cities - April 1990

Who Will Carry The Word? - November 1993

Beauty's Daughter - Opened January 25, 1995

Saint Lucy's Eyes - Opened March 28, 2001

=== Other ===
Cornet Christoph Rilke's Song of Love and Death (Manhattan School of Music) - December 1990

The Postman Always Rings Twice (Boston Lyric Theatre) - March 1994

Turn of the Screw (Manhattan School of Music) - April 1994
