= Lezlie Lowe =

Canadian writer and journalist

- Born: Halifax, Nova Scotia, Canada
- Occupations: Writer; journalist; professor
- Employer: University of King's College
- Notable work: No Place to Go (2018); The Volunteers (2022)
- Website: lezlielowe.com

Lezlie Lowe is a Canadian writer and journalist from Nova Scotia. She is the author of two books: No Place to Go: How Public Toilets Fail our Private Needs (2018), and The Volunteers: How Halifax Women Won the Second World War (2022). She teaches journalism at the University of King's College, and has written an extensive body of articles for The Chronicle Herald since 2009.

== Biography ==
Lowe is from Halifax, Nova Scotia. She teaches journalism at the University of King's College.

Lowe began writing for the Halifax newspaper The Chronicle Herald in 2009. She resigned from her position as a columnist with the newspaper in 2016, following the publication of a controversial story concerning refugee children attending the Chebucto Heights Elementary School in Cowie Hill.

In 2018, Lowe published an article in The Chronicle Herald detailing three men who had caused harm to her in the past, referred to in the article as her "MeToo stories". While she did not name the three men discussed in the article, one chose to contact her following its publication, apologizing for his inappropriate actions when they were teenagers. Lowe stated that his apology was "exceptional", and that the man took full responsibility for his prior actions.

Lowe released her first book in 2018, titled No Place to Go: How Public Toilets Fail our Private Needs. The book was published by Coach House Books of Toronto, Ontario. It discusses the importance of public bathrooms in urban planning, arguing that city planners have historically neglected to provide adequate public bathroom facilities when designing city spaces. No Place to Go was listed amongst "25 works of Canadian nonfiction to watch" by CBC Books in 2018, and was a finalist for the Dartmouth Book Award for Non-fiction at the 2019 Atlantic Book Awards.

Her second book, The Volunteers: How Halifax Women Won the Second World War, was published in 2022 by Nimbus Publishing. The book concerns the role of women volunteers in Halifax during the Second World War, at a time when housing and commodities were in short supply in the city.

In 2023, Lowe led a walking tour in Halifax with fellow Nova Scotia author Rebecca Rose, intended to highlight landmarks of historical significance to the LGBT community in the city. Locations in the tour included those mentioned in Lowe's book The Volunteers and Rose's book Before the Parade.

== Publications ==
- Lowe, Lezlie (2018). No Place to Go: How Public Toilets Fail our Private Needs. Toronto, ON: Coach House Books. ISBN 978-1-5524-5370-4. OCLC 1022779702.
- — (2022). The Volunteers: How Halifax Women Won the Second World War. Halifax, NS: Nimbus Publishing. ISBN 978-1-7747-1054-8. OCLC 1286373255.
