= Lunenburg Progress Enterprise =

Canadian newspaper in Nova Scotia

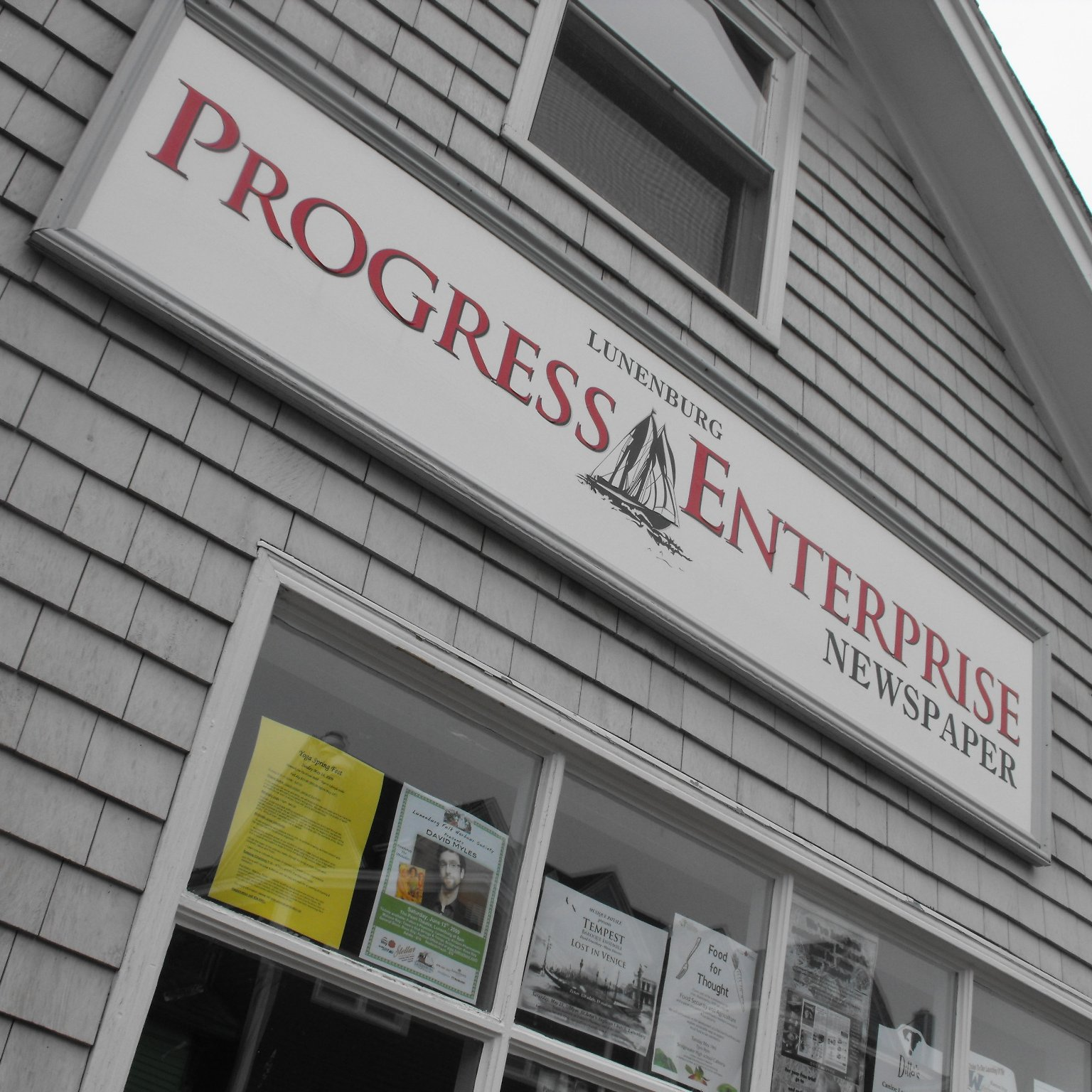
- Type: Weekly newspaper
- Format: Broadsheet
- Founded: 1876
- Ceased publication: May 3, 2011
- Price: lighthousenow.ca/archives.php
- Website: www.southshorenow.ca

The Lunenburg Progress Enterprise was a weekly community newspaper published on Nova Scotia’s South Shore by Lighthouse Publishing Ltd, one of the last family-owned newspapers in Canada. On May 3, 2011, the Bridgewater Bulletin and the Progress Enterprise merged to become one single paper, the Lunenburg County Progress Bulletin. In November 2014, the newspaper rebranded its name, becoming the LighthouseNOW Progress Bulletin. Lighthouse employs approximately 50 professionals and maintains two offices, its main printing and production facility in Bridgewater and a satellite office located in historic Old Town Lunenburg, a UNESCO World Heritage site. Lighthouse’s newspapers and website are recent winners of the Canadian Community Newspaper Association Better Newspapers competition.

== History ==
- Many newspapers have served the South Shore of Nova Scotia since Henry Fisher began The Nova Scotia Farmer in 1863. Only The Progress Enterprise in Lunenburg, founded by E.I. Nash in 1876, and The Bulletin in Bridgewater, founded by C.J. Cragg in 1888, survived.
- Margaret and Ralph Hennigar purchased the newspapers and printing business in the late 1960s and early 1970s. Lighthouse Publishing is one of the few remaining family-owned newspaper operations in Canada. Today, most newspapers are under group or chain ownership.
- The Bulletin and the Progress Enterprise have a combined circulation of about 12,000. The Lighthouse Log is a 26,000 controlled-circulation advertising vehicle distributed free throughout Lunenburg and Queens Counties.
- In 1995 the weekly papers were redesigned by editor Vernon Oickle and his staff, and changed format from broadsheet to 11 x 17-inch tabloid. Lighthouse Publishing gradually moved from the original hot lead makeup to cut-and-paste layout and design, and then to full pagination. Now it has gone digital and has moved from computer to plate, rather than from computer to negative to plate.
- Lynn Hennigar became president and general manager of Lighthouse Publishing in 1995, replacing her father, Ralph Hennigar. Marg Hennigar, publisher, internationally recognized editorial writer and long-time columnist died, but not before completing a media literacy book for children entitled No News Is Bad News.
