= Poet Laureate of Halifax, Nova Scotia =

Canadian municipal poet laureate

The Poet Laureate of Halifax, Nova Scotia is a poet laureate position appointed by the municipal government of the Halifax Regional Municipality, Nova Scotia, Canada. The position was first created in 2001, and has been held by nine poets as of 2024.

== Poets Laureate ==
- Sue MacLeod (2001–2005)
- Lorri Neilsen Glenn (2005–2009)
- Shauntay Grant (2009–2011)
- Tanya Davis (2011–2013)
- El Jones (2013–2015)
- Rebecca Thomas (2015–2018)
- Afua Cooper (2018–2020)
- Susan Goyette (2020–2024)
- Anna Quon (2024–present)
