= Michelle Wamboldt =

Canadian writer

Michelle Wamboldt is a Canadian writer and journalist from Truro, Nova Scotia. Her 2022 novel Birth Road was the winner of the Margaret and John Savage First Book Award for Fiction at the Atlantic Book Awards in 2024.

== Biography ==
Wamboldt was born and raised in Truro, Nova Scotia. She is married, and has two children. She attended Dalhousie University where she earned a Bachelor of Arts in English literature, subsequently studying journalism in Toronto. Her debut novel, Birth Road, is a work of historical fiction set in Truro inspired by the life of her grandmother. The book follows Helen, a pregnant woman in Truro dealing with an abusive marriage. The book is illustrated with a map of Truro by Kim Danio, and was praised for its strong emotional narrative. Birth Road was the winner of the Margaret and John Savage First Book Award for Fiction at the Atlantic Book Awards in 2024.

Wamboldt has previously worked in government communications, and has contributed to publications such as CTV National News and The Chronicle Herald.

== Publications ==
- Wamboldt, Michelle (2022). Birth Road. Halifax, NS: Vagrant Press. ISBN 978-1-7747-1040-1. OCLC 1263742846.
- — (2022). "Meeres Rausch". The Dalhousie Review. 101 (3). Halifax, NS: Dalhousie University.

== Recognition ==
- 2024 Atlantic Book Awards: Margaret and John Savage First Book Award for Fiction for Birth Road
