= Dean Jobb =

Canadian writer and journalist

Dean Jobb is a Canadian writer and journalist from Nova Scotia. He has been awarded three Atlantic Journalism Awards across his 40+ years in journalism, and has authored several nonfiction books. Jobb is professor emeritus at the University of King's College.

== Biography ==
Dean Jobb is from Wolfville, Nova Scotia. His career in journalism spans over 40 years, including a 20-year career at The Chronicle Herald; he has received three Atlantic Journalism Awards in recognition of his work. Jobb is an associate professor at the University of King's College, and was named professor emeritus of the university's School of Journalism.

Jobb has authored several nonfiction books, particularly in the area of true crime. His book Calculated Risk: Greed, Politics and the Westray Tragedy (1994) was the winner of the City of Dartmouth Book Award. His 2015 book Empire of Deception was named the Chicago Writers Association Book of the Year, won the Crime Writers of Canada Arthur Ellis Award, and was a finalist for the Hilary Weston Writers' Trust Prize for Nonfiction.

== Publications ==
=== Nonfiction books ===
- Jobb, Dean (1991). Crime Wave. Lawrencetown Beach, NS: Pottersfield Press. ISBN 0-9190-0168-8.
- — (1994). Calculated Risk. Halifax, NS: Nimbus Publishing. ISBN 978-1-5510-9070-2.
- — (2015). Empire of Deception. Toronto, ON: HarperCollins. ISBN 978-1-4434-4109-4.
- — (2021). The Case of the Murderous Dr. Cream. Toronto, ON: HarperCollins. ISBN 978-1-4434-5332-5.
- — (2022). The Acadian Saga. Halifax, NS: Nimbus Publishing. ISBN 978-1-7747-1127-9.
- — (2024). A Gentleman and a Thief. Toronto, ON: HarperCollins. ISBN 978-1-4434-6853-4.

=== True crime collections ===
- Jobb, Dean (2020). Daring, Devious and Deadly. Lawrencetown Beach, NS: Pottersfield Press. ISBN 978-1-9897-2523-8.
- — (2021). Madness, Mayhem & Murder. Lawrencetown Beach, NS: Pottersfield Press. ISBN 978-1-9897-2561-0.

=== Reference works ===
- Jobb, Dean; Cribb, Robert; McKie, David; Vallance-Jones, Fred (2006). Digging Deeper. Oxford University Press. ISBN 978-0-1954-2127-9. (Note: Third edition published in 2015. ISBN 978-0-1990-0849-0. "Borrowable copy" – via the Internet Archive.)
- Jobb, Dean (2023). Media Law in Canada (4th ed.). Toronto, ON: Emond Publications. ISBN 978-1-7746-2341-1.
