= Brian Tucker (writer) =

Canadian writer

Brian Tucker is a Canadian writer, whose debut novel Big White Knuckles was a finalist for the Chapters/Books in Canada First Novel Award and the ReLit Award for Fiction in 2008.

The novel was published in 2007 by Vagrant Press. Originally from New Waterford, Nova Scotia, Tucker was living in Trout Brook, New Brunswick at the time of the novel's publication.
