= Ruth Holmes Whitehead =

Canadian ethnologist (1947–2023)

Ruth Holmes Whitehead ONS
- Born: 10 October 1947; Charleston, South Carolina, United States
- Died: 29 August 2023 (aged 75); Halifax, Nova Scotia, Canada
- Occupations: Historian; ethnologist; museum curator

Ruth Holmes Whitehead ONS (10 October 1947 – 29 August 2023) was a Canadian historian, ethnologist, and museum curator at the Nova Scotia Museum.

== Biography ==
Ruth Holmes Whitehead was born on 10 October 1947 in Charleston, South Carolina, to parents Ruth Holmes Humphreys Everett and Hobart Ray Everett. She attended Agnes Scott College in Decatur, Georgia, graduating with a degree in Spanish. She moved to Canada in 1968 before returning to Charleston to continue her education, graduating with a Bachelor of Arts from the College of Charleston.

Whitehead moved to Nova Scotia in 1972, where she took a position with the Nova Scotia Museum. She worked there until her retirement in 2003, following which she was named Curator Emeritus and remained as a research associate until 2019. Across her career, she wrote or co-authored 18 books, and contributed articles to a variety of magazines and academic journals. Her book Black Loyalists: Southern Settlers of Nova Scotia's First Free Black Communities won the Atlantic Book Award for Scholarly Writing in 2014.

In 1995, Whitehead was awarded an honorary Doctor of Laws by St. Francis Xavier University. She was inducted as a member of the Order of Nova Scotia in 2014.

Whitehead died in Halifax, Nova Scotia, on 29 August 2023. Her funeral took place at the Halifax Shambhala Centre on 1 September.

== Publications ==
- Whitehead, Ruth Holmes (1980). Elitekey: Micmac Material Culture from 1600 A.D. to the Present. Halifax, N.S.: Nova Scotia Museum. ISBN 978-0-9196-8013-5.
- — (1982). Micmac Quillwork: Micmac Indian Techniques of Porcupine Quill Decoration, 1600–1950. Halifax, N.S.: Nova Scotia Museum. ISBN 978-0-9196-8022-7.
- —; McGee, Harold Franklin (1983). The Micmac: How Their Ancestors Lived Five Hundred Years Ago. Halifax, N.S.: Nimbus Publishing. ISBN 978-0-9208-5221-7.
- — (1988). Stories from the Six Worlds: Micmac Legends. Halifax, N.S.: Nimbus Publishing. ISBN 0-9210-5406-8.
- — (1989). Six Micmac Stories. Halifax, N.S.: Nimbus Publishing. ISBN 0-9196-8035-6.
- — (1991). The Old Man Told Us: Excerpts from Mi'kmaw History, 1500–1950. Halifax, N.S.: Nimbus Publishing. ISBN 0-9210-5483-1.
- — (2002). Tracking Doctor Lonecloud: Showman to Legend Keeper. Fredericton, N.B.: Goose Lane Editions. ISBN 978-0-8649-2356-1.
- —; Robertson, Carmelita (2003). Life of Boston King. Halifax, N.S.: Nimbus Publishing. ISBN 978-1-5510-9451-9.
- — (2013). Black Loyalists: Southern Settlers of Nova Scotia's First Free Black Communities. Halifax, N.S.: Nimbus Publishing. ISBN 978-1-7710-8016-3.
- — (2015). Niniskamijinaqik: The Mi'kmaq in Art and Photography. Halifax, N.S.: Nimbus Publishing. ISBN 978-1-7710-8263-1.
- — (2020). Nova Scotia and the Great Influenza Pandemic, 1918–1920. Halifax, N.S.: Nimbus Publishing. ISBN 978-1-7710-8915-9.
