= Dan Soucoup =

Canadian writer and journalist

Dan Soucoup is a Canadian writer and journalist from New Brunswick.

== Biography ==
Dan Soucoup was born in Moncton, New Brunswick. He graduated from Harrison Trimble High School in the 1960s, following which he attended the University of New Brunswick and the University of Ottawa. Soucoup began his career in the book publishing industry in 1980; he was the general manager of Nimbus Publishing, retiring in 2012. Soucoup wrote a history column for the Times & Transcript for several years, and has written various works on the history of New Brunswick and Nova Scotia. In 2009, he received the Halifax Regional Municipality Mayor's Award for Literary Achievement.

== Publications ==
- Soucoup, Dan (1997). Historic New Brunswick. Lawrencetown Beach, N.S.: Pottersfield Press. ISBN 978-1-8959-0009-5.
- — (1998). Edwardian Halifax: Postcard Glimpses of an Era, 1900–1920. Halifax, N.S.: Nimbus Publishing. ISBN 978-1-5510-9261-4.
- — (1999). Glimpses of Old Moncton. Halifax, N.S.: Maritime Lines. ISBN 978-1-8944-2003-7.
- — (1999). The Maritime Book of Days. Lawrencetown Beach, N.S.: Pottersfield Press. ISBN 978-1-8959-0026-2.
- — (2002). Looking Back: From the Pages of the Times & Transcript. Halifax, N.S.: Maritime Lines. ISBN 978-1-8944-2007-5.
- — (2005). McCully's New Brunswick: Historic Aerial Photographs, 1931–1939. Toronto: Dundurn Press. ISBN 978-1-5500-2587-3.
- — (2006). The New Brunswick Phrase Book. Lawrencetown Beach, N.S.: Pottersfield Press. ISBN 978-1-8959-0084-2.
- — (2007). The Nova Scotia Phrase Book. Dartmouth, N.S.: Maritime Lines. ISBN 978-1-8944-2030-3.
- — (2009). Know New Brunswick: The Essential History. Halifax, N.S.: Maritime Lines. ISBN 978-1-8944-2032-7.
- — (2010). Railways of New Brunswick: A History. Halifax, N.S.: Nimbus Publishing. ISBN 978-1-8944-2035-8.
- — (2011). Logging in New Brunswick: Lumber, Mills, & River Drives. Halifax, N.S.: Nimbus Publishing. ISBN 978-1-8944-2036-5.
- — (2012). Maritime Firsts: Historic Events, Inventions & Achievements. Halifax, N.S.: Nimbus Publishing. ISBN 978-1-8944-2037-2.
- — (2012). The Christmas Secret: An Atlantic Canadian Christmas Reader. Halifax, N.S.: Nimbus Publishing. ISBN 978-1-5510-9933-0.
- — (2013). Failures and Fiascos: Atlantic Canada's Biggest Boondoggles. Halifax, N.S.: Nimbus Publishing. ISBN 978-1-7710-8042-2.
- — (2013). A Short History of Moncton. Halifax, N.S.: Nimbus Publishing. ISBN 978-1-8944-2038-9.
- — (2014). A Short History of Halifax. Halifax, N.S.: Nimbus Publishing. ISBN 978-1-7710-8184-9.
- — (2014). The Finest Tree and Other Christmas Stories From Atlantic Canada. Halifax, N.S.: Nimbus Publishing. ISBN 978-1-7710-8170-2.
- — (2015). A Short History of Fredericton. Halifax, N.S.: Nimbus Publishing. ISBN 978-1-7710-8301-0.
- — (2017). Winter: Atlantic Canadian Stories. Halifax, N.S.: Nimbus Publishing. ISBN 978-1-7710-8558-8.
- — (2017). Explosion in Halifax Harbour 1917. Halifax, N.S.: Nimbus Publishing. ISBN 978-1-7710-8554-0.
- — (2019). Atlantic Canada's Greatest Storms. Halifax, N.S.: Nimbus Publishing. ISBN 978-1-7710-8773-5.
