= Writers' Federation of Nova Scotia =

Canadian writers' organization

- Abbreviation: WFNS
- Established: 1976; 50 years ago
- Type: Non-profit charitable organization
- Purpose: Writers' organization
- Location: Halifax, Nova Scotia, Canada
- Region served: Nova Scotia
- Members: 700+
- Executive Director: Oriana Duinker
- Funding: Nova Scotia Department of Communities, Culture, Tourism and Heritage
- Award: Creative Community Impact Award (2024)
- Website: writers.ns.ca

The Writers' Federation of Nova Scotia (WFNS) is a Canadian non-profit charitable organization supporting the profession of creative writing in Nova Scotia. Established in 1976, the Federation has over 700 members at various career stages. It offers several programs intended to support and recognize Nova Scotian writers, and administers literary awards at the Atlantic Book Awards and the Nova Scotia Book Awards.

== History ==
The Writers' Federation of Nova Scotia was established by a group of writers in 1975, incorporated as a non-profit organization in 1976, and received official charitable status in 1990. Initial funding for the WFNS was provided by the Cultural Affairs Division of the Nova Scotia Recreation Department. The first Executive Director of the WFNS was Geraldine Gaskin, appointed in the fall of 1975 by the interim committee. The poet and journalist Greg Cook, a founding member of the WFNS, served as its Executive Director in the late 1970s.

The Dramatists' Co-op of Nova Scotia was an offshoot of the WFNS established in 1976 by the playwrights Christopher Heide, Andrew Wetmore, and John Culjak. The co-op established a small publishing house, and worked to promote Nova Scotian plays. It was discontinued in 1991.

The WFNS was the winner of the Creative Community Impact Award at the 2024 Creative Nova Scotia Awards.

== Membership and administration ==
The Writers' Federation of Nova Scotia has a two-tiered membership structure. Anyone may join the organization as a general member, irrespective of writing experience or place of residence, to receive their newsletter and participate in workshops and other events. Skilled writers who have produced a professional body of work may apply to join the Writers' Council, the Federation's professional wing, and become eligible for compensated opportunities offered through WFNS programs. The Writers' Council is a permanent designation, and its members retain their position for life. As of 2025, the WFNS has a membership of over 700 writers at various career stages.

The WFNS is administered through a combination of professional staff and elected leadership. The Executive Director, hired by the Federation, manages its day-to-day operations and business affairs. The Board of Directors, working closely with the Executive Director, is responsible for the general management and policy of the WFNS. Its members serve two-year terms, elected by the general membership. The Board of Directors comprises eight to twelve members, including four board officers: the President, Vice President, Treasurer, and Secretary.

== Programs ==
=== Booktoberfest ===
Booktoberfest is an annual literary festival administered by the Writers' Federation of Nova Scotia. Beginning in 2022, the festival is hosted at the Halifax Central Library and features creative writing workshops, public readings, and books for sale from local authors.

=== Writers in The Schools ===
With financial support from the provincial government, the WFNS offers a "Writers in The Schools" program, through which Nova Scotian writers provide presentations and workshops in elementary and secondary schools. The program is intended to support youth literacy in the province, and has been received positively by school staff and students. Participants have included writers such as Martine Jacquot, Julian Mortimer Smith, and Pamela Hickman.

=== Poetry in Motion ===
Poetry in Motion, a public poetry project, was created by the WFNS in 2019. The program asked Nova Scotia residents to submit short poems to be featured on advertisements in bus and ferry terminals across the Halifax Regional Municipality. The poems were also featured on digital signs in libraries and community centres, and printed on postcards. Intended to showcase local poetry and "enhance Halifax's reputation as a cultural destination", Poetry in Motion was inspired by similar public poetry projects in other North American cities.

=== Jampolis Cottage ===
The WFNS owns Jampolis Cottage, a 230-year-old house in Avonport used for writers' residency programs. The cottage was purchased by Neil Jampolis and his wife Jane Reisman in 1996, and in 2003 they placed it in a living trust with the stipulation that it would be donated and converted into a writers' or artists' retreat after their death. After Jane died in 2017 and Neil in 2019, the trustee of the property approached six different organizations about acquiring it, and the WFNS replied swiftly with much excitement. The Jampolis Living Trust officially offered the cottage to the Writers' Federation of Nova Scotia in September 2021, with the Federation assuming ownership in December 2022.

=== Awards ===
The Writers' Federation of Nova Scotia administers several literary awards at the Atlantic Book Awards and the Nova Scotia Book Awards, including the Thomas Raddall Atlantic Fiction Award, the J. M. Abraham Poetry Award, the Evelyn Richardson Non-Fiction Award, and the Ann Connor Brimer Award. In 2020, the WFNS established the Maxine Tynes Nova Scotia Poetry Award, named in memory of the poet Maxine Tynes.

== See also ==
- List of writers from Nova Scotia
- Literature of Nova Scotia
- Writers' Union of Canada
