= Neil Peter Jampolis =

Lighting designer (1943–2019)

- Born: March 14, 1943; Brooklyn, New York, U.S.
- Died: December 15, 2019; Los Angeles, California, U.S.
- Known for: Lighting Design
- Spouse: Jane Reisman
- Awards: Tony Award; Drama Desk Award for Outstanding Lighting Design

Neil Peter Jampolis was a light designer, set designer, and stage director. He was best known for the light designing he did for the Royal Shakespeare Theatre’s 1975 production of Sherlock Holmes for which he won a Tony Award and a Drama Desk Award. Jampolis went on to win an American Theatre Wing Hewes Design Award in 1982 and three more Tony Award nominations for The Innocents, Black and Blue, and Orpheus Descending. He also won a Los Angeles Drama Critics Circle Award for lighting Lily Tomlin and Jane Wagner's Signs of Intelligent Life in the Universe. Jampolis had also worked as either a light designer, set designer, or stage director with Pilobolus Dance Theatre the Vienna State Opera, La Scala, the Metropolitan Opera, the Santa Fe Opera, Opera Pacific, the New York City Opera, Pasadena Playhouse, and Hollywood's Matrix Theatre among others. He was most recently one of the main light designers for the Seattle Opera and a distinguished professor of theatre at UCLA's School of Theatre, Film, and Television. He also occasionally worked as a stage director and set designer for Seattle Opera.
