= Margaret King Robinson =

American oceanographer

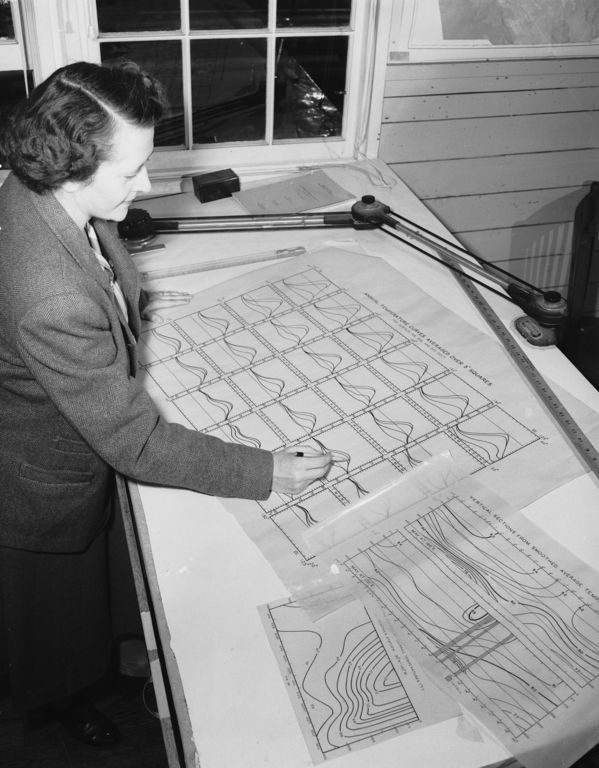
- Margaret King Robinson in 1953
- Born: Margaret King; February 23, 1906; Provo, Utah, U.S.
- Died: February 20, 2006 (age 99)
- Other names: Margaret King McCeney
- Occupation: Oceanographer
- Relatives: William H. King (uncle); David S. King (cousin)

Margaret King Robinson (February 23, 1906 – February 20, 2006) was an American oceanographer. She was head of the Bathythermograph Unit at the Scripps Institution of Oceanography in California, and "a pioneer in the use of computers to analyze world-wide oceanographic data."

== Early life and education ==
Margaret King was born in Provo, Utah and raised in Salt Lake City, the daughter of Samuel Andrew King and Anna Maynetta Bagley King. Her father was an attorney, and her brother Karl Vernon King was a judge. Her uncle was William H. King, a United States senator. Her cousin David S. King was a congressman from Utah.

King graduated from the University of Utah in 1928, having majored in French and German. She pursued further language studies in Europe, and at the University of California, Berkeley. She trained as a stenographer in Casper, Wyoming. She earned a master's degree in oceanography from the University of California, Los Angeles in 1951.

== Career ==
During World War II, Robinson trained as a draftswoman, and was a tool designer at an aircraft company in San Diego. She started working at the Scripps Institution of Oceanography as a stenographer after the war; in 1947 she became a laboratory technician, and in 1949 an engineering aide (doing work similar to the "human computers"). Scripps director Harald Sverdrup cautioned her from becoming more involved in the scientific work of the institution, saying "Women will never be accepted as oceanographers."

Robinson was nonetheless promoted to assistant oceanographer in 1952, and became associate special oceanographer in 1962. She headed the Bathythermograph Unit beginning in February 1957, analyzing ocean temperature changes at various depths, over time and space, using computers to manage the large data sets involved. Her work had applications in tracking submarines, tuna migration, and hurricanes, among other fields. She retired from Scripps in 1973.

Robinson consulted as a technical expert to the Royal Thai Navy in the 1960s, supported by UNESCO. She was also vice president of Compass Systems, Inc., of San Diego. She belonged to the American Association for the Advancement of Science, the American Geophysical Union, the Arctic Institute of North America, and Phi Kappa Phi. Later in life, Robinson was active in local politics. In 1976 was elected to the Democratic Party's central committee for San Diego County; she held this seat through the 1980s. In 1983, the University of Utah Alumni Association honored Robinson with a Merit of Honor Award.

== Publications ==
- "The use of a common reference period for evaluating climatic coherence in temperature and salinity records from Alaska to California" (1960 report)
- "Statistical evidence indicating no long-term climatic change in the deep waters of the north and south Pacific oceans" (1960)
- "Temperature Structure in the Transition Region of the North Pacific" (1965, with John Northrop)
- "Atlas of Monthly Mean Sea Surface and Subsurface Temperature and Depth of the Top of the Thermocline: North Pacific Ocean" (1971, with Roger A. Bauer)
- "Atlas of Monthly Mean Sea Surface and Subsurface Temperature and Depth of the Top of the Thermocline; Gulf of Mexico and Caribbean Sea" (1973 technical report)
- "The physical oceanography of the Gulf of Thailand, Naga Expedition; Bathythermograph (BT) temperature observations in the Timor Sea, Naga Expedition, Cruise S11" (1974 report)

== Personal life ==
Margaret King was married to James P. McCeney from 1932 until their divorce in 1936. She married journalist Arthur Goodwin Robinson in 1937; he died in 1966. She had two children, Renan and Creighton, both named for her older siblings. She died in 2006, at the age of 99. Her papers are at the University of California, San Diego.
