= CJNI-FM =

Radio station in Halifax, Nova Scotia (2005–2026)

Coordinates: 44°39′03″N 63°39′25″W

- Final CJNI-FM logo from 2025 to 2026.
- Halifax, Nova Scotia; Canada
- Broadcast area: Halifax Regional Municipality
- Frequency: 95.7 MHz
- Branding: 95.7 NewsRadio Halifax

Programming
- Format: News--Talk--Sports
- Affiliations: CityNews; The Canadian Press; ABC News Radio; Associated Press; Bloomberg Radio; Westwood One Sports; Halifax Mooseheads Radio Network; Montreal Canadiens Radio Network; Toronto Blue Jays Radio Network

Ownership
- Owner: Rogers Radio; (Rogers Media, Inc.)
- Sister stations: CFLT-FM

History
- First air date: October 11, 2005; 20 years ago
- Last air date: July 7, 2026; 17 days ago
- Call sign meaning: News and Information

Technical information
- Class: C1
- ERP: 65,000 watts horizontal polarization only
- HAAT: 224.1 metres (735 ft)

Links
- Webcast: Listen Live
- Website: halifax.citynews.ca

CJNI-FM (95.7 MHz) was a Canadian radio station in Halifax, Nova Scotia. CJNI had a news--talk--sports format branded as 95.7 NewsRadio Halifax. The station was owned by Rogers Radio, a division of Rogers Sports & Media, which also owned sister station CFLT-FM. CJNI-FM was the only commercial news/talk/sports station in Atlantic Canada. Studios and offices were on Young Street in Halifax, while the transmitter was located on Washmill Lake Drive in Clayton Park.

== Programming ==
On weekdays, CJNI had an all-news block during morning drive times. Middays and afternoons, two talk shows were heard, hosted by Todd Veinotte and Jeff Marek. Overnight and early weekend mornings, CJNI carried the national Rogers all-news service, shared with CFTR Toronto, CKWX Vancouver and CFFR Calgary.

"An Hour To Give" with Sam Laprade and "The Big Story" podcast ran on the weekend mornings, along with "The Weekend Gardener" with Niki Jabbour during the noon hours.

In the evening and weekend afternoons, CJNI carried Westwood One Sports. The station featured play-by-play from three teams: Toronto Blue Jays, Montreal Canadiens, and the Halifax Mooseheads in the QMJHL.

== History ==
On November 26, 2004, Rogers Communications received approval from the Canadian Radio-television and Telecommunications Commission (CRTC) for a new English-language News/Talk commercial FM radio station in Halifax to operate at 95.7 MHz. The station officially signed on the air on October 11, 2005, at 5:30a.m.

The station was networked with CKNI-FM in Moncton, and CHNI-FM in Saint John, until August 2014, when those two stations were sold to separate owners and flipped to music formats.

In June 2021, Rogers announced that it would rebrand CJNI and its other all-news and news/talk radio stations under the CityNews brand beginning October 18, 2021. This was despite the fact that Citytv did not operate in the region, only being available in Atlantic Canada on cable and satellite as an out-of-market distant signal.

In July 2024, the station rebranded as 95.7 NewsRadio Halifax.

On July 7, 2026 Rogers Sports and Media announced that CJNI-FM had shut down as one of six radio station closures in various locations across the country, with license being returned to the CRTC.

== See also ==
- Rick Howe
