= Peter Evander McKerrow =

Peter E. McKerrow
- Born: Peter Evander McKerrow; February 23, 1841; Antigua
- Died: December 22, 1906 (aged 65); Halifax, Nova Scotia
- Occupations: Furrier; Church Clerk; Author

Peter Evander McKerrow (February 23, 1841 – December 22, 1906) was the first Afro-Caribbean-Canadian author and the first Black historian in Nova Scotia.

== Early life ==
Peter Evander McKerrow was born in Antigua, British West Indies, on February 23, 1841.

== Career ==
As a young British West Indies sailor, he made his way to Nova Scotia. Eventually, he established himself as a merchant and businessman in Halifax. By the early 1880s, Peter E. McKerrow was conducting business under the firm Thomas & Company as a hatter and furrier. He worked in partnership with Thomas Fur Co. until 1894.

He became a committed member of Halifax's African Baptist Church in 1874 and was appointed secretary in 1875, a role he held for thirty consecutive years. When the African Baptist Church was incorporated as Cornwallis Street Baptist Church (now New Horizons Baptist Church), he held roles as trustee, deacon, and Sunday school superintendent.

On April 1, 1884, a delegation of community and religious leaders, including Peter E. McKerrow, appeared before a legislative committee on bills to advocate for equal treatment of schoolchildren whose families paid taxes, regardless of race.

His book, "A Brief History of the Coloured Baptists of Nova Scotia and Their First Organization as Churches, A.D. 1832," was published in 1895, which gave him the distinction of being the first Black historian of the province. Richard Preston was among those documented by the African Baptist Association secretary.

== Personal life ==
On February 9, 1863, he married Mary Thomas in Halifax.

== Death ==
McKerrow died from tuberculosis in Halifax, Nova Scotia, Canada, on December 22, 1906.

== See also ==
- New Horizons Baptist Church
