= Barbara Grantmyre =

Canadian writer (1908–1977)

Barbara Lucas Grantmyre (1908 – 1977) was an English-Canadian writer.

Born in Bolton, Lancashire, she emigrated in 1911 with her family, settling in Nova Scotia. She is known for several works of nonfiction including Lunar Rogue (1963) about the criminal Henry More Smith and The River that Missed the Boat (1975) about the Shubenacadie Canal. She also wrote short stories including a collection published as A Rose for Minnie Mullet in 1964. She was a contemporary of Thomas Raddall.

Her husband was Thomas Grantmyre and they lived in Elmsdale, Nova Scotia. She had four children - Merritt , Gretchen, Leigh and Brenda.

Barbara also wrote several short stories including the Christmas Goose.
