= Rick Howe =

Canadian radio personality (1954–2024)

- Born: Eric Fred Howe; 14 May 1954
- Died: 31 January 2024 (aged 69)
- Occupations: Radio personality; writer
- Years active: 1972–2021
- Known for: Hotline; The Rick Howe Show

Rick Howe (14 May 1954 – 31 January 2024) was a Canadian radio personality and writer from Nova Scotia, best known for his radio programs Hotline on CJCH-FM and The Rick Howe Show on News 95.7 in Halifax. He was the recipient of a Lifetime Achievement Award at the RTDNA Atlantic Awards in 2012, and wrote three books across his career: Radio Talk (2010), Behind the Mic (2022), and Eyewitness (2023).

== Early life ==
Howe was born Eric Fred Howe on 14 May 1954 in Oakville, Ontario, to parents Fred and Norma Howe (née Silliker). He had two younger brothers. His father served in the Canadian Armed Forces as a helicopter mechanic, and Howe spent several years living in Germany where his father was posted. While in Germany, he volunteered at a military radio station.

== Career ==
Howe began his career in radio in December 1972 at CKNB in New Brunswick, doing hockey play-by-play announcing. He joined CFBC in 1976 as the only news reporter at the station. He then became employed at CJCH-FM in Halifax in 1978, where he was the host of the radio program Hotline, one of the longest-running radio programs in Atlantic Canada until 2008.

Following the end of Hotline, Howe joined News 95.7 in Halifax where he hosted The Rick Howe Show. In 2012, he was the recipient of a Lifetime Achievement Award at the RTDNA Atlantic Awards. After an extended leave from the station due to an illness, Howe retired from News 95.7 in 2021 and moved to an oceanfront cottage with his wife, CBC journalist Yvonne Colbert.

Howe wrote a column for The Halifax Daily News, and was the author of three books across his career: Radio Talk (2010), Behind the Mic (2022), and Eyewitness (2023).

== Death and legacy ==
Howe died of cancer on 31 January 2024, at the age of 69. He was remembered by the Premier of Nova Scotia Tim Houston as "one of the most recognizable voices on radio in our region". Halifax MP Andy Fillmore issued a statement following Howe's death, writing that "his unmistakable voice kept us engaged and informed. He asked tough questions of decision makers — always with respect and his usual vigour".

Following his death, the CityNews broadcast studio in Halifax was renamed the Rick Howe Studio in honour of his contributions to radio in the Maritimes.

== Publications ==
- Howe, Rick (2010). Radio Talk: Four Decades Covering the News in Atlantic Canada. Lawrencetown Beach, NS: Pottersfield Press. ISBN 978-1-8974-2619-7. OCLC 612718920.
- — (2022). Behind the Mic: Five Decades of Covering the News in the Maritimes. Lawrencetown Beach, NS: Pottersfield Press. ISBN 978-1-9897-2597-9. OCLC 1303565604.
- — (2023). Eyewitness: Atlantic Canadians Experience History in Their Own Words. Lawrencetown Beach, NS: Pottersfield Press. ISBN 978-1-9907-7025-8. OCLC 1381795955.

== See also ==
- Robert J. Thacker, co-host of The Science Files on The Rick Howe Show
