= Anna Quon =

Canadian poet and novelist

Anna Quon is a Canadian poet and novelist from Nova Scotia, currently serving as the Poet Laureate of Halifax since 2024. She is the author of three novels, the first of which was released in 2009. She wrote and produced the film Me & My Teeth in 2022, with financial support from the Lunenburg Doc Fest.

== Biography ==
Quon is from Dartmouth, Nova Scotia. She published her first novel, Migration Songs, through Invisible Publishing in 2009. The book was the winner of the Salty Ink Judge a Book By Its Cover Contest in 2010. In 2013, she released her next novel, Low, also published by Invisible. Her 2022 novel Where The Silver River Ends explores themes of self discovery and prejudice, and re-introduced characters from her previous two novels.

In 2022, Quon was awarded CA$20,000 by the Lunenburg Doc Fest to go towards production of her film, Me & My Teeth. The film premiered the following year at the 2023 Lunenburg Doc Fest.

Quon was appointed as the ninth Poet Laureate of Halifax on 23 April 2024, serving until 2027.

== Publications ==
- Quon, Anna (2009). Migration Songs. Halifax, NS: Invisible Publishing. ISBN 978-0-9782-1856-0. OCLC 434559531.
- — (2013). Low. Halifax, NS: Invisible Publishing. ISBN 978-1-9267-4332-5. OCLC 825745557.
- — (2021). Body Parts. Kentville, NS: Gaspereau Press. ISBN 978-1-5544-7222-2. OCLC 1251928732.
- — (2022). Where The Silver River Ends. Halifax, NS: Invisible Publishing. ISBN 978-1-9887-8487-8. OCLC 1262124253.
