= El Jones =

Canadian journalist, professor, activist

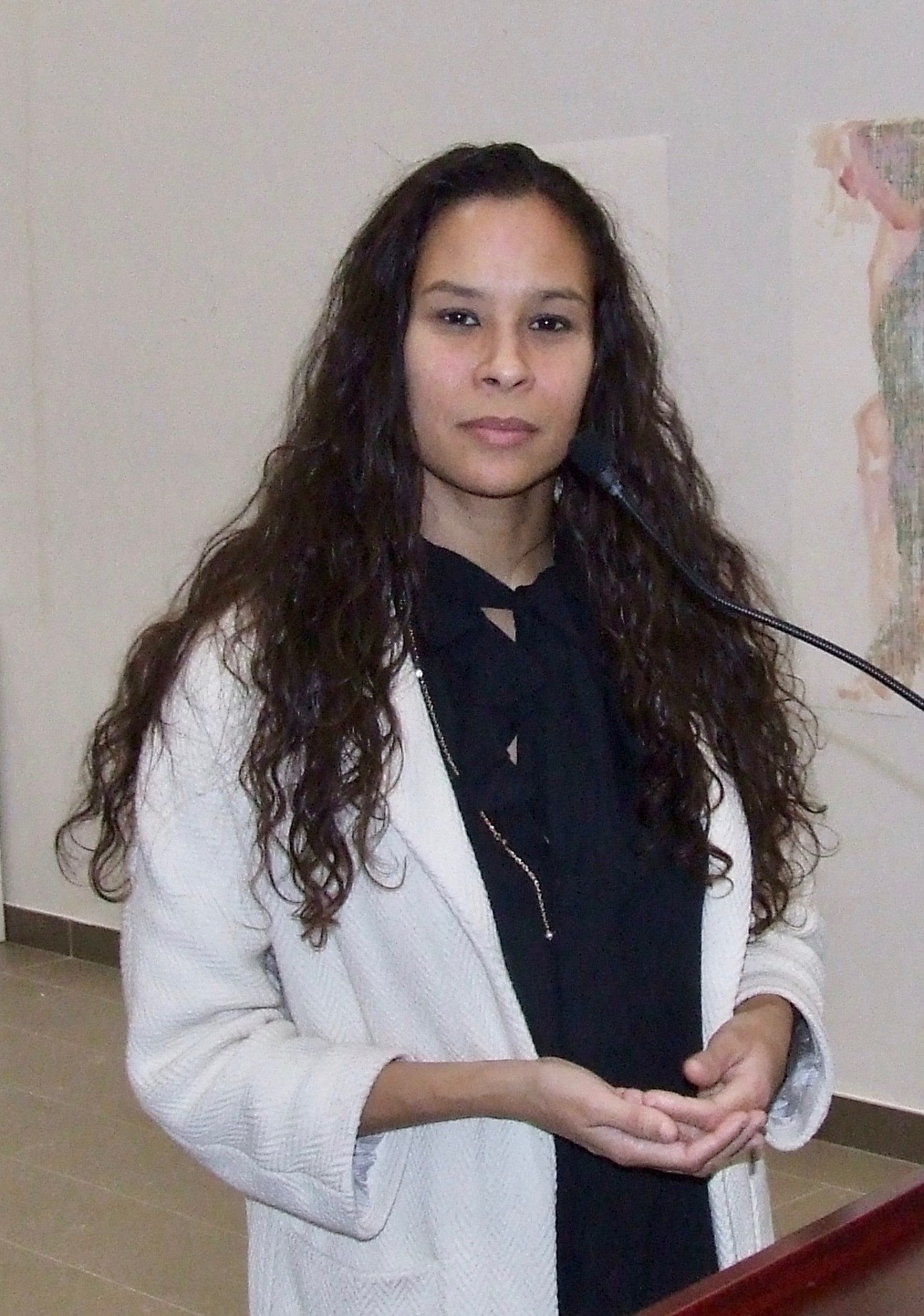
- Jones in 2018
- Born: Wales
- Occupation: Poet, journalist, columnist, professor
- Subject: Racism, colonialism, prison reform, human rights, social justice

El Jones is a poet, journalist, professor and activist living in Halifax, Nova Scotia. She is currently an assistant professor in the Department of Political and Canadian Studies at Mount Saint Vincent University. Her work has appeared in publications including CBC, the Globe and Mail and the Washington Post.

== Biography ==
El Jones was born in Wales and grew up in Winnipeg. She holds a PhD in Cultural Studies from Queen's University.

She was the fifth Poet Laureate of Halifax, Nova Scotia from 2013 to 2015.

Jones' first book, Live From the Afrikan Resistance! published in 2014 by Roseway, an imprint of Fernwood Publishing, is a collection of poems about resisting white colonialism.

In 2015, she was a resident at the International Writing Program at University of Iowa. Her work focuses on social justice issues such as feminism, prison abolition, anti-racism, and decolonization; she wrote in The Washington Post in June 2020 about "the realities of white-supremacist oppression that black people in Canada have long experienced."

Since 2016, she has co-hosted a radio show called Black Power Hour on CKDU-FM, an educational program which provides information on Black history and culture aimed at incarcerated people. Listeners from prisons call in to rap and read poetry that they have written, providing a voice to people who rarely get a wide audience. She is a contributor to the Halifax Examiner and has contributed to HuffPost. She has taught at Dalhousie University, Acadia University, Nova Scotia Community College, Saint Mary's University and Mount Saint Vincent University.

From 2017 to 2019, she was the 15th Nancy's Chair in Women's Studies at Mount Saint Vincent University.

In 2021, Jones became a contributor to The Breach, a Canadian alternative news website. In the same year, she was writer-in-residence at the University of Toronto Scarborough.

In March 2022, she was amongst 151 international feminists signing Feminist Resistance Against War: A Manifesto, in solidarity with the Russian Feminist Anti-War Resistance. (Note: This manifesto was criticized by both Ukrainian feminists and members of the Feminist Anti-War Resistance themselves.) In November 2022, her book, Abolitionist Intimacies, was published by Fernwood Publishing.

Jones was interviewed and featured in the award-winning documentary feature film Reimagining Safety (2023) by director Matthew Solomon. The film covers defunding the police and the George Floyd protests.

In 2024, Jones received an honorary Doctor of Letters from Acadia University.

== Awards and honours ==
- National Slam Champion (2007, 2008).
- Named a Bold Visionaryby the A Bold Vision National Leadership Conference (2014).
- Dr. Allan Burnley (Rocky) Jones Individual Award at the Nova Scotia Human Rights Award (2016) for her "commitment to advancing human rights, equity and inclusion."
- 2017/18 Poet in Residence for Poetry in Voice.
- Atlantic Journalism Award for Commentary: Any Medium (2018).
- Atlantic Journalism Award for Commentary: Any Medium (2019).
- Honorary Doctor of Letters from Acadia University.
