= H. Percy Blanchard =

Canadian lawyer and author (1862–1939)

H. Percy Blanchard was a Canadian lawyer and science fiction author. Blanchard was born in Windsor, Nova Scotia in 1862. He later resided in Baddeck, Nova Scotia. He died in 1939. He is known for his novel After the Cataclysm: A Romance of the Age to Come. He also authored Draft of an Imperial Constitution, With Comments, a legal document proposing a constitution for the British Empire.
