= Carol Bruneau =

Canadian author

Carol Bruneau (born November 21, 1956 in Halifax, Nova Scotia) is a Canadian writer who has published novels, short fiction, and non-fiction.

== Biography ==
She lives in Halifax, Nova Scotia, where she has taught writing at NSCAD (Nova Scotia College of Art and Design University) and Dalhousie University.

She has a master's degree in English literature from Dalhousie University and a master's degree in journalism from the University of Western Ontario, and has worked extensively as a workshop leader and mentor to new and emerging writers.

Two of her novels have been published internationally. Her articles, reviews and essays have been published nationwide in newspapers, journals and anthologies.

Her literary influences include fairy tales that her father read aloud and family stories she overheard from her mother, historical fiction and the novels of Lucy Maud Montgomery in grade school, and Margaret Laurence and Thomas Head Raddall in high school.

== Career ==
Her first novel Purple for Sky (2000) won the Thomas Head Raddall Award and the Dartmouth Book Award for fiction in 2001. The book was also shortlisted that year for the Pearson Readers' Choice Award.

Her novel Glass Voices was a Globe and Mail Best Book for 2007.

Her short story collection A Bird on Every Tree (2018) was shortlisted for the Thomas Raddall Atlantic Fiction Award and the Dartmouth Book Award for Fiction.

A Circle on the Surface (2018) won the 2019 Dartmouth Book Award for Fiction.

Her novel Brighten the Corner Where You Are (2020) is inspired by the life and art of Nova Scotian folk artist Maud Lewis.

== Publications ==
- After the Angel Mill. Cormorant, 1995
- Depth Rapture. Cormorant, 1998
- Purple for Sky. Cormorant, 2000 (U.S. title: A Purple Thread for Sky)
- Why Men Fish Where They Do. Gaspereau, 2001
- Berth. Cormorant, 2005
- Glass Voices. Cormorant, 2007, re-released Nimbus Publishing/Vagrant Press, 2018
- These Good Hands. Cormorant, 2015
- A Bird on Every Tree. Nimbus Publishing/Vagrant Press, 2018
- A Circle on the Surface. Nimbus Publishing/Vagrant Press, 2018
- Brighten the Corner Where You Are: A Novel Inspired by the Life of Maud Lewis. Nimbus Publishing/Vagrant Press, 2020
- No Ordinary Magic: The Art of Laurie Swim. Goose Lane Editions, 2023
- Threshold. Nimbus Publishing/Vagrant Press, 2024
