= Margaret Robinson (activist and scholar) =

Canadian activist (born 1973)

- Born: 1973 (age 52–53); Eskikewa'kik, Nova Scotia
- Education: University of Toronto
- Occupations: Scholar and activist
- Years active: 20 years

Margaret Robinson (born 1973) is a Canadian Mi’kmaw feminist scholar and activist noted for her research on sexuality, specifically bisexuality, sexual and gender minority people's experiences of mental health and Indigenous health. She is currently an associate professor at Dalhousie University.

== Biography ==
Robinson received a M.A. in Theology in 2001 and a Ph.D in Theology in 2009, both from the University of Toronto. She was a past co-chair of the Dyke March, project coordinator of the Risk & Resilience project, and project lead for the Bisexuality Disclosure Kit. She is a vegan, presents at conferences and community events on Indigenous veganism, and has written on the topic of veganism and Mi'kmaw stories.

== Career ==
Robinson's publications have included topics such as bisexual women's use of cannabis, the experiences of bisexual people in seeking mental health supports, and bisexuality, poverty and mental health. Robinson and co-authors developed a measure for bisexual women's experiences of microaggressions and microaffirmations. From 2014 to 2016 Robinson was the Researcher in Residence in Indigenous Health at the Ontario HIV Treatment Network in Toronto. Robinson has received numerous fellowships and major grants, including a 2015 Canada Council for the Arts grant for Aboriginal Writing used towards a residency at the Banff Centre. In 2017, Robinson was appointed vice-chair of the Canadian Institute of Health Research's Indigenous Health Advisory Board.

== Activism ==
In 2011, Robinson was the Project Coordinator of the "This is Our Community" poster and postcard campaign, developed with Rainbow Health Ontario in order to challenge biphobia. The project, which consisted of four posters featuring identities "erased" via biphobia (such as bisexual and femme, bisexual and Black, bisexual and trans) received international attention, including coverage in The Advocate. She is a former facilitator with both the Toronto Bisexual Network and Bisexual Women of Toronto groups, as well as director of the Toronto Bisexuality Education Project.
