= Nimbus Publishing =

Publishing company

Nimbus Publishing Ltd.
- Founded: 1978
- Country of origin: Canada
- Headquarters location: Halifax, NS
- Distribution: Self-Distributed (Canada); Baker & Taylor Publisher Services (US)
- Publication types: Books
- Imprints: Vagrant Press
- Owners: Terrilee Bulger & Heather Bryan
- No. of employees: 17
- Official website: www.nimbus.ca

Nimbus Publishing is a publishing company based in Halifax, Nova Scotia. The company specializes in subjects relevant to the Atlantic Provinces.

Until 2016, the company published an average of 35 to 40 new titles a year, but expanded its output to 55 titles in 2017. The company publishes in a broad span of genres including children’s picture and fiction books, non-fiction, history, nature photography, current events, biography, sports, and cultural issues.

It is the largest Canadian-English language publisher east of Toronto.

In 2005, Nimbus introduced a new fiction imprint called Vagrant Press. In 2012, owner John Marshall sold the company and general manager Dan Soucoup retired. Two employees, Terrilee Bulger and Heather Bryan, bought the company in order to prevent acquisition by a larger publishing house.

In March 2018, the publishing house moved to a warehouse on Strawberry Hill Street in Halifax. At that time, a coffee shop and bookstore were added to the premises.

== Notable authors ==
- Sheree Fitch
- Jill Barber
- Graham Steele
- Bette MacDonald
- Paul Hollingsworth
- Janet Kitz
- John Boileau
- Nancy Regan
- Carol Bruneau

== Notable titles ==
- Bud the Spud and Hockey Night Tonight, by Stompin' Tom Connors
- Shattered City: The Halifax Explosion and the Road to Recovery, by Janet Kitz
- We Were Not the Savages, by Daniel N. Paul

== See also ==
- Literature of Nova Scotia
- List of writers from Nova Scotia
