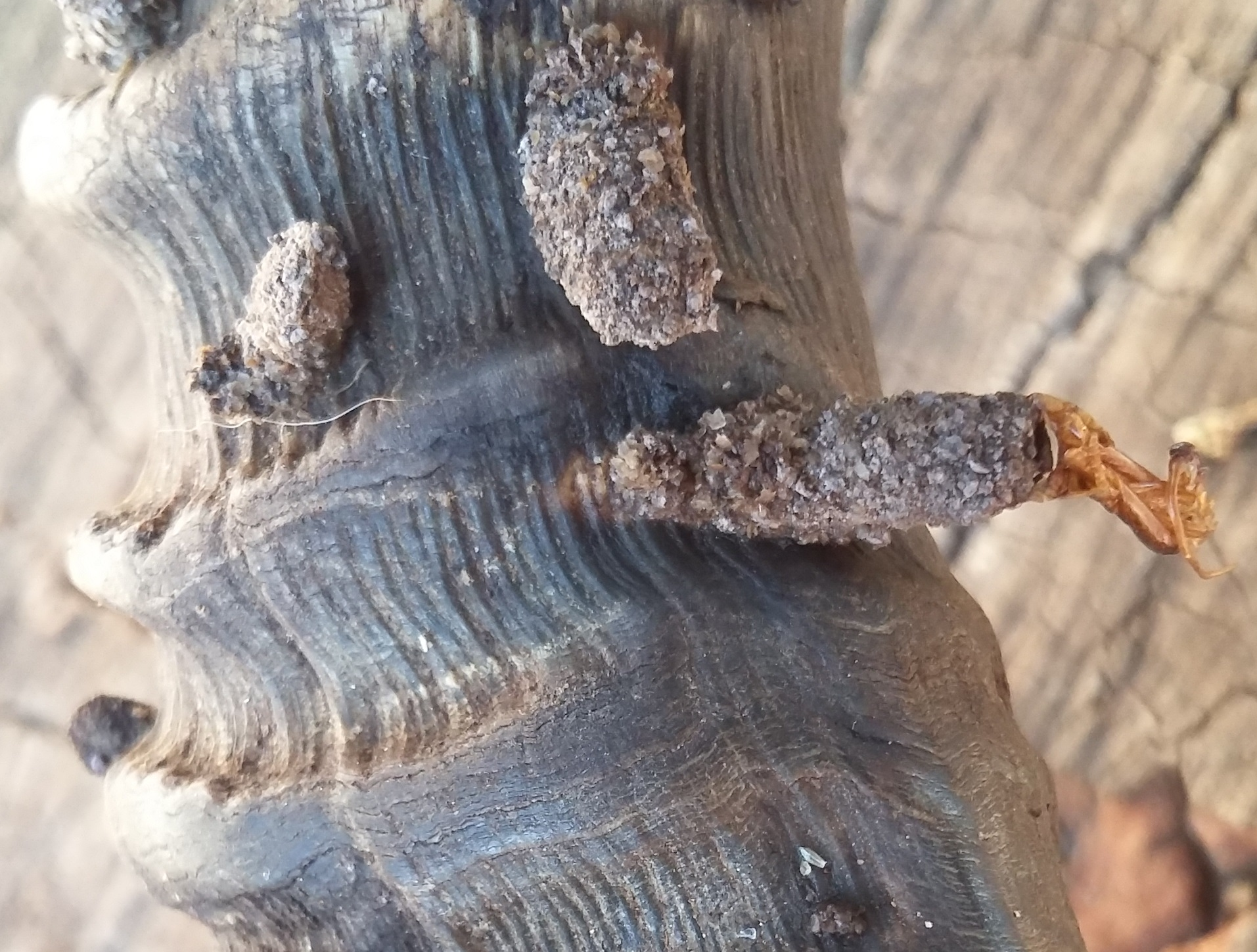

Scientific classification
- Kingdom: Animalia
- Phylum: Arthropoda
- Class: Insecta
- Order: Lepidoptera
- Family: Tineidae
- Genus: Ceratophaga
- Species: C. vastella

Binomial name
- Ceratophaga vastella (Zeller, 1852)

Synonyms
- Euplocamus (Scardia) vastellus Zeller, 1852; Tinea vastella Auct.; T. gigantella Stainton, 1860; T. lucidella Walker, 1863

= Ceratophaga vastella =

Species of moth

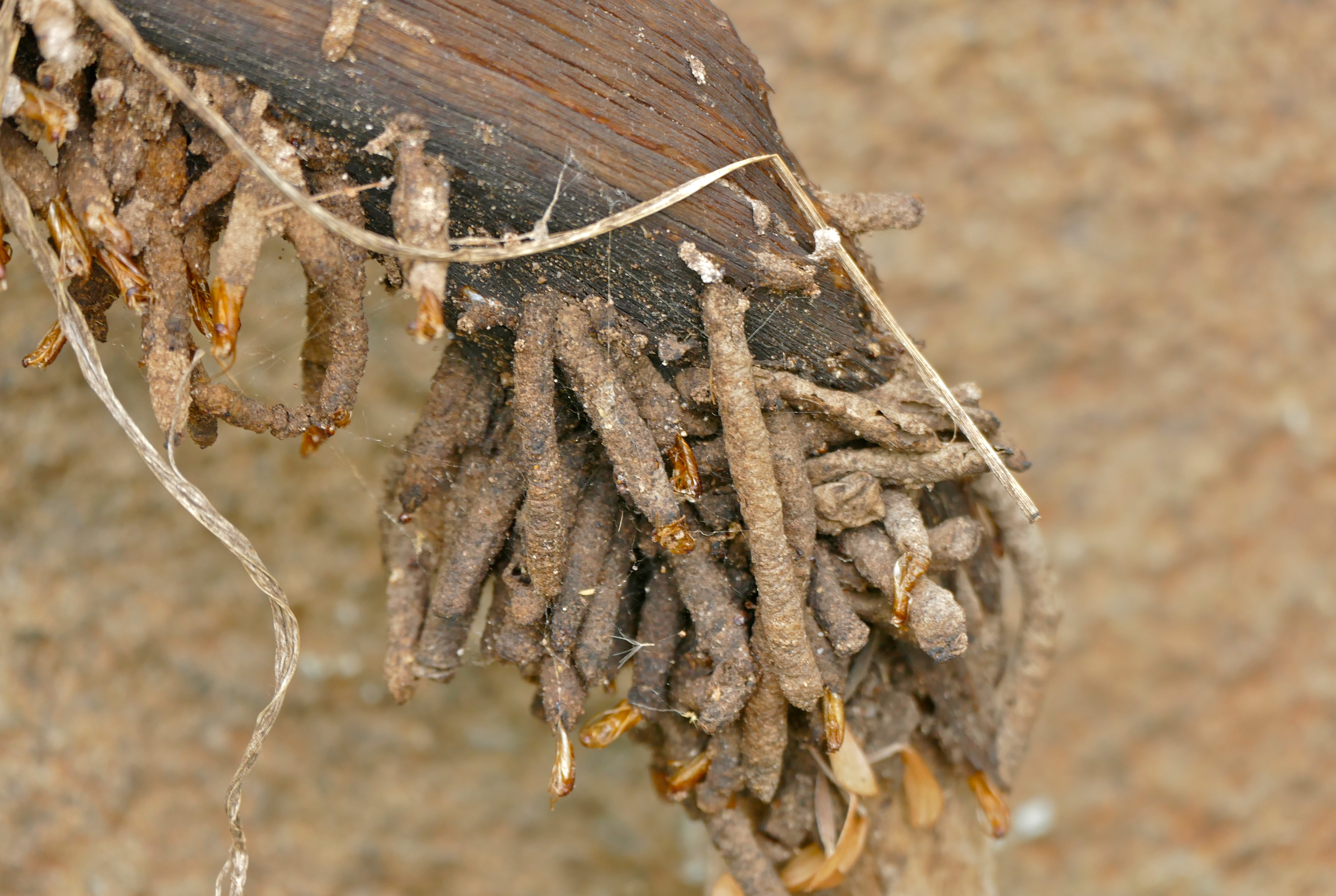
Larval towers on old kudu horn

Ceratophaga vastella, the horn moth, belongs to the clothes moth family Tineidae and is noted for its larva's ability to feed on keratin from the horns and hooves of dead ungulates, and occasionally on dried fruit or mushrooms. Keratin, a protein which makes up skin, hair, nails and feathers, is extremely resistant to proteolysis by the enzymes from specialised micro-organisms such as fungi and bacteria.

Ceratophaga vastella is widespread in the Afrotropical realm. Thus far there are 16 described species in the genus, with 12 found in Africa, three in Asia and one, C. vicinella, from the Americas, which feeds on the shells of Gopherus polyphemus, a tortoise from the southeastern United States, but also feeds on the horns of cattle in the US.

Larvae are cream-coloured and thick-set, with brown head and tip of abdomen. Usually the larval cases are noticed on the surface of old horns. The adult moth is a typical tineid, having a conspicuous tuft of yellow hair on the head. Other Tineidae share C. vastella's diet of keratin, dried animal hides and wool - C. ethadopa (Meyr.), Monopis rejectella (Wlk.), Tinea pellionella and Tineola bisselliella.

The entomologist Thomas de Grey (1843–1919) suggested that the larvae of this species may occasionally be found in the horns of living animals.

Mr. Haliday made some remarks on two pairs of antelope's horns, exhibited to the meeting by J. M. Neligan, M.D. These horns belonging, one pair to Oreas canna (pi. i., fig. 3), the other to Kobus ellipsiprymnus were brought home from the Gambia by J. Fitzgibbon, Esq., M.D., who lately purchased them from some natives in the market at Macarthy's Island, being struck with their appearance, as they were perforated by grubs enclosed in cases which projected abundantly from the surface of the horns, although these were taken from freshly-killed animals, the blood not having dried up on them when brought to market. The most remarkable point was the evidence that the horns had been thus infested while the animal was yet living which bore them. As the fibrous substance of the horn undergoes little or no change at the death of the animal, there seems to be no reason why the moth should not deposit its eggs when the living animal is at rest, nor why the larva should not penetrate the horn; but the question must be considered to be "sub judice".

— Thomas de Grey, 6th Baron Walsingham - Micro-Lepidoptera

Zeller and Roland Trimen, however, expressed their doubts about larvae feeding off the horn of a living animal and were supported in this view by Lieutenant Colonel the Hon. Wenman Coke, a soldier and hunter.

Thomas de Grey also wrote: "I have in my own collection a pair of horns of Kobus ellipsiprymnus, which are bored by the larvae of this species, the substance of the horn itself being visibly perforated in several places up to one-fourth from the base". This is a clear suggestion that the larvae do not confine themselves to keratin, but will also venture into the bony part of the horn.
