= Constance Piers =

Canadian journalist, poet, editor

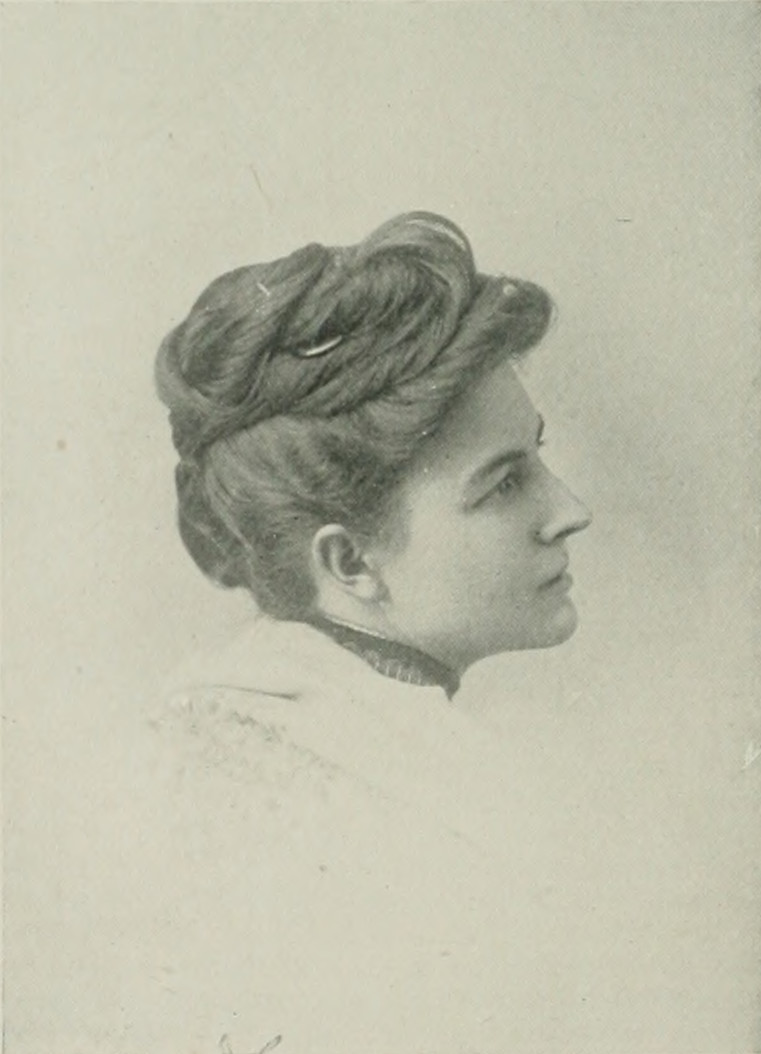
- Photo in A Woman of the Century
- Born: Constance Fairbanks; May 10, 1866; Dartmouth, Nova Scotia, Canada
- Died: 1939 (aged 72–73)
- Occupations: Journalist, poet, editor
- Spouse: Harry Piers (m. 1901)
- Children: 1
- Writing career
- Language: English
- Notable works: Frankincense and Myrrh: Selections From the Poems of the Late Mrs. William Lawson

Constance Piers (née, Fairbanks; May 10, 1866 – 1939) was a Canadian journalist, poet, and editor from Nova Scotia. Despite an irregular early education due to ill health, she became a voracious reader and was largely self-taught. Piers began her career as a secretary and gradually took on more editorial responsibilities, eventually serving as assistant editor of the Halifax Critic and associate editor of The Caledonian-Record. She wrote numerous articles and poems for various periodicals, and her work was included in Dr. Theodore Harding Rand's A Treasury of Canadian Verse.

== Early life and education ==
Constance Fairbanks was born in Dartmouth, Nova Scotia, Province of Canada, May 10, 1866. She belonged to an old provincial family nearly all of whose representatives demonstrated literary ability, and several of whom were long associated with the history of Nova Scotia. She was the second child and oldest daughter of Lewis Piers Fairbanks and Ella Augusta (DeWolfe) Fairbanks, granddaughter of Charles Rufus Fairbanks, and was one of a family of nine children.

Owing to delicate health when a child, Piers was able to attend school in Dartmouth only in an irregular manner, but, being fond of the company of those older than herself, her education occurred outside of the schoolroom. At the age of thirteen, she ceased to have systematic instruction, and with patient determination, she continued her education by careful reading.

== Career ==
Piers' father's financial troubles obliged her to work for a living, which was highly exceptional among daughters of the upper middle class. Finding it necessary to obtain employment, she became, in 1887, secretary to Charles Frederick Fraser, the blind editor of the Critic, and in that position, gained a practical knowledge of the work which became her occupation. Gradually, as her ability to write became known, and as she developed a keen recognition of what was required by the public, Piers was placed in charge of various departments of the paper, until in June, 1890, the management of the editorial and certain other departments was virtually transferred to her. She took editorial charge of the Critic, as assistant editor, 1890–1892; and associate editor of The Caledonian-Record in St. Johnsbury, Vermont, 1893–1894.

Frankincense and myrrh

Interested in music, literature, and art, Piers wrote numerous articles in the Critic, the Caledonian-Record, and other periodicals. Many of her poems appeared in The Week, Canadian Magazine, and other journals. Some of her poems were included in Dr. Rand's A Treasury of Canadian Verse. She contributed papers to the Halifax Ladies' Musical Club and various literary societies. She selected and edited, jointly with her husband, the poems of Mary Jane Katzmann, published under the title of Frankincense and Myrrh: Selections From the Poems of the Late Mrs. William Lawson (Halifax, 1893). She was a member of the Ladies' Musical Club, a society organized for the study of music and of the lives of composers and their works.

== Personal life ==
On January 7, 1901, in Halifax, she married Harry Piers, curator of the Provincial Museum of Nova Scotia, and librarian of the Provincial Science Library. They had one son, Edward Stanyan Fairbanks Piers.

In religion, she was a member of the Church of England.

She favored woman suffrage, but not militant methods.

Constance Fairbanks Piers died in 1939.

== Selected works ==
- Piers, Harry & Fairbanks, Constance (ed.), Frankincense and myrrh. Selections from the poems of Mrs. William Lawson, 1893 (text) via Internet Archive
