= Nova Scotia Museum of Natural History =

Coordinates: 44°38.714′N 63°35.110′W

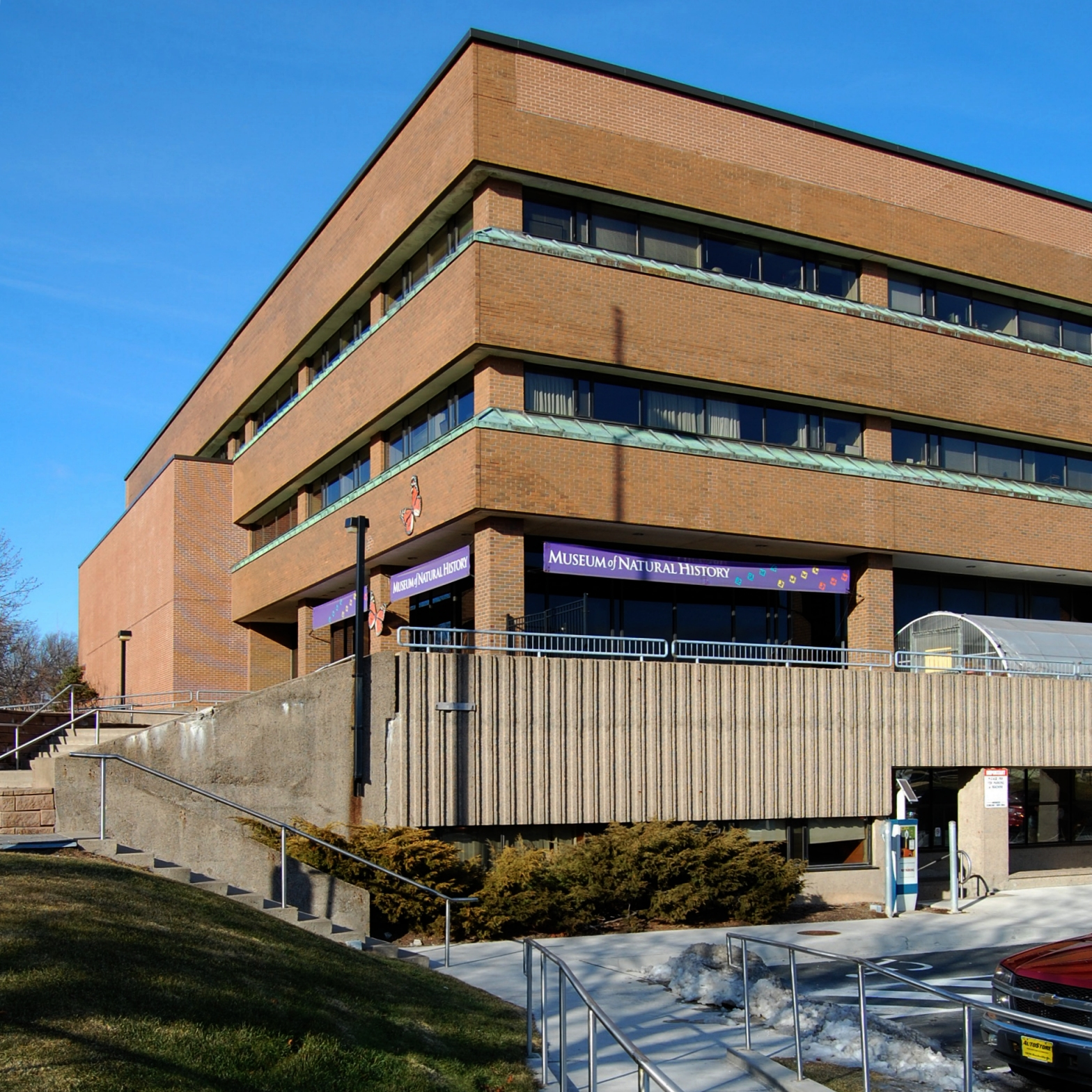
- Museum of Natural History, Halifax, 2008
- Established: 1868
- Location: 1747 Summer Street, Halifax, Nova Scotia, Canada
- Type: Natural history museum
- Director: Stephanie Smith
- Website: naturalhistory.novascotia.ca

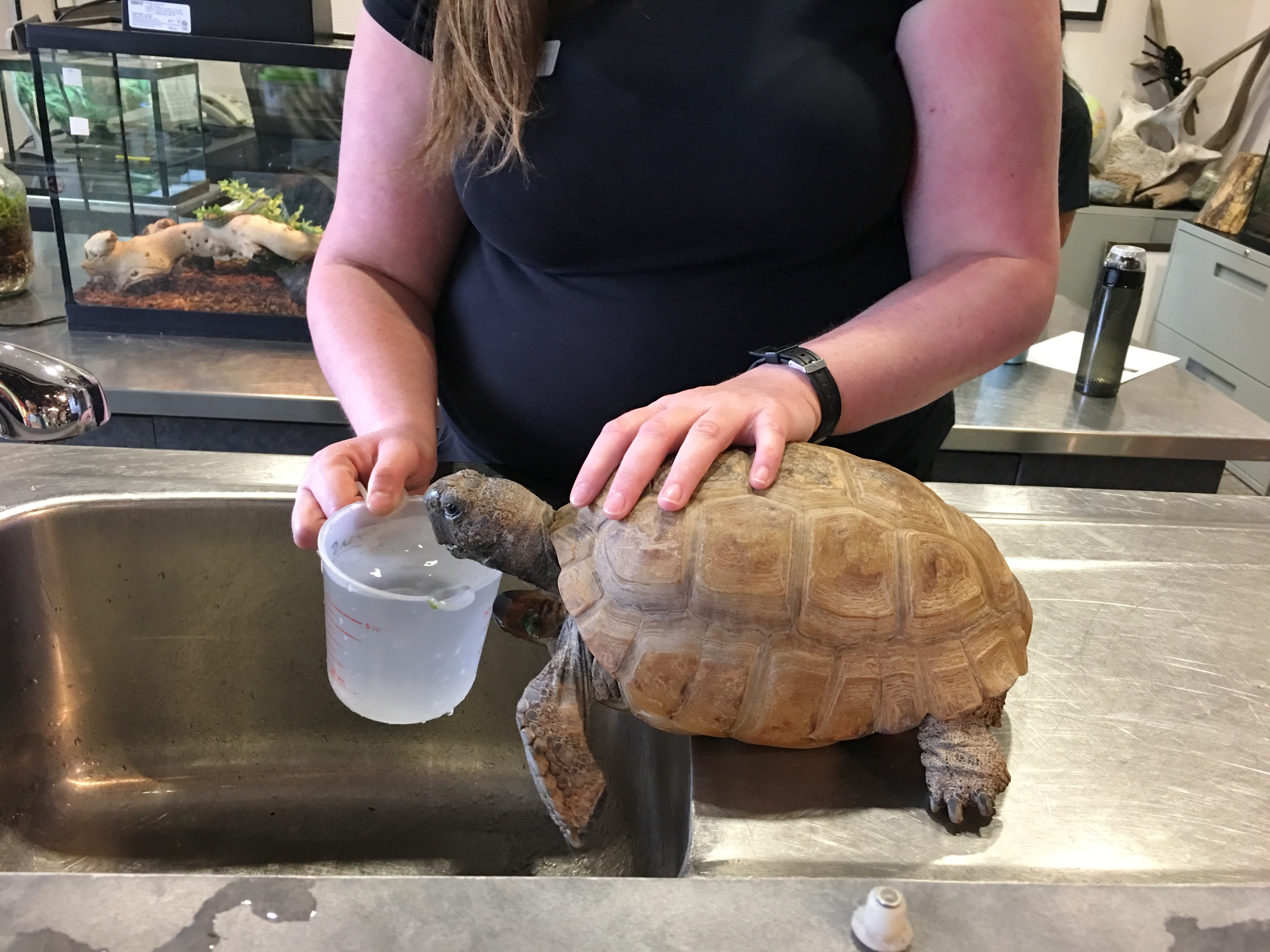
Gus (August 2019)

The Nova Scotia Museum of Natural History, part of the Nova Scotia Museum, is located in downtown Halifax, Nova Scotia. The museum includes collections and exhibits concerning the natural sciences as well as artifacts of cultural significance to Nova Scotia.

Gus, the oldest known gopher tortoise, has lived at the museum for most of his life, after being purchased by a former curator of the museum, Donald Crowdis. The museum celebrated Gus's 97th birthday on August 11, 2019.

== History ==
The Provincial Museum was first established in 1868. In 1910, it moved into the Nova Scotia Technical College on Spring Garden Road (the building now home to Dalhousie University's Faculty of Architecture and Planning). It was renamed the Nova Scotia Museum of Science in 1947. In 1970, the museum moved to the current building on Summer Street. In 1993, the Museum of Natural History was created as a constituent institution of the wider Nova Scotia Museum system. The Nova Scotia Museum headquarters is located in the same building as the Museum of Natural History.

The Carbon Arc Cinema screens a regular program of rep theatre films in the museum's theatre.
