= Ceratophaga =

Scientific classification
- Kingdom: Animalia
- Phylum: Arthropoda
- Class: Insecta
- Order: Lepidoptera
- Family: Tineidae
- Subfamily: Tineinae
- Genus: Ceratophaga; Petersen, 1957

Species
- Ceratophaga haidarabadi Zagulajev, 1966; Ceratophaga orientalis Ceratophaga vastella Ceratophaga vicinella

Genus of moths

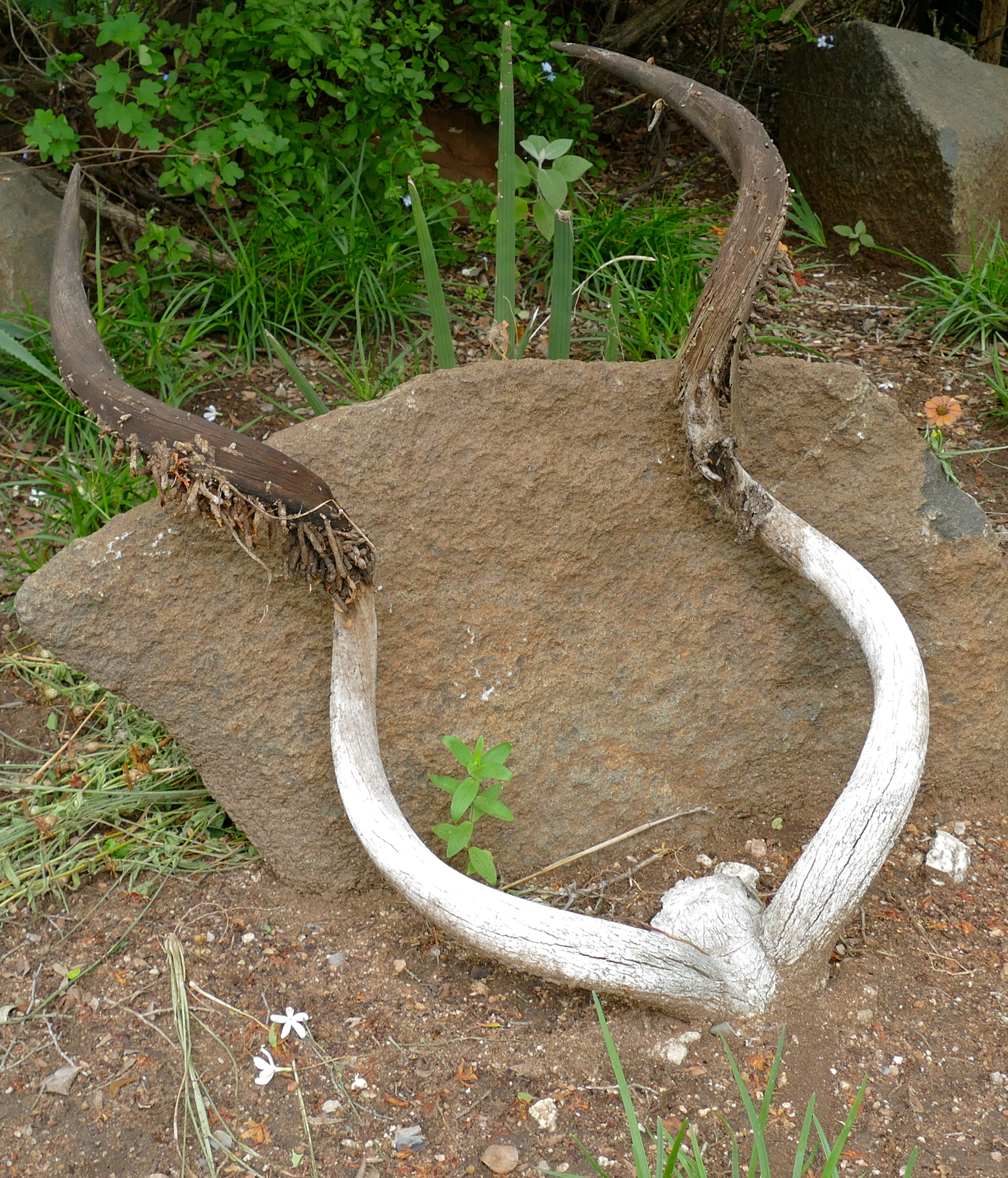
An African species of horn moth, Ceratophaga vastella, on old kudu horns. Cases with the exuviae of the emerged moths protruding from the open ends are empty, while intact cases with their ends still closed, contain larvae or pupae of the moths.

Ceratophaga is a genus of moths belonging to the family Tineidae. The genus name comes from Ancient Greek κέρας (kéras), meaning 'horn', and φάγος (phágos), meaning 'eater'. Sixteen species are currently recognised, widespread in the Afrotropical realm and Asia. In the Americas one species has been described: Ceratophaga vicinella, which occurs in the southeastern United States. Twelve of the known species occur in Africa, and of those Ceratophaga vastella is perhaps the best-known.

The larvae of most Tineidae (of which clothes moths are the most familiar) have adapted to feeding on non-herbaceous material, but Ceratophaga are remarkable in that they feed, apparently exclusively, on solid keratin from dead vertebrates. For most species this usually means the horns and hooves of ungulates, but the North American Ceratophaga vicinella feeds on the shells of the tortoise Gopherus polyphemus.
