= Donald Crowdis =

Canadian educator, museum curator, broadcaster and blogger

- Born: December 24, 1913; Halifax, Nova Scotia, Canada
- Died: November 27, 2011 (aged 97); Toronto, Ontario, Canada
- Occupations: T.V. Host, Museum Curator and Director, Blogger

Donald Crowdis (December 24, 1913 – November 27, 2011) was a Canadian educator, museum curator, broadcaster, and one of the world's oldest bloggers. He created The Nature of Things for CBC Television in 1960, which remains one of the longest running and most successful programs in Canada, and was a member of the executive team which oversaw the establishment of the Ontario Science Centre. Crowdis was also one of the last living survivors of the Halifax Explosion.

== Life and career ==
Born in Halifax, Nova Scotia, he received degrees in science, arts and education from Dalhousie University. He later studied education administration at Columbia University and museum studies at the Buffalo Museum of Science on a Carnegie fellowship. He worked initially as a school teacher, rising to a school administrator, before transitioning to museum administration.

=== Museum administration ===
In 1940, he succeeded the Harry Piers as curator and director of the Nova Scotia Museum. He served at the museum for 25 years, focusing on the growth of its science collections until his departure in 1965. Notable initiatives included the creation of the first public planetarium in Canada, and live exhibits aimed at attracting children, including the development of innovative fish tanks which would come to be emulated elsewhere by public aquariums. Among the live exhibits he introduced was a 20-year-old gopher tortoise, now known as Gus, purchased in 1942. The tortoise still thrives in 2019 as one of the museum's most popular attractions. His role transitioned from that of curator to director as he hired several specialist curators in various sciences. In 1947, he was a founding member and later President of the Canadian Museums Association. While still with the museum, Crowdis accepted an invitation to spearhead efforts to establish a permanent library for Halifax. This eventually resulted in the construction of the Halifax Memorial Library, designed by Leslie Fairn and completed in 1951. It was later known as the Spring Garden Road Memorial (Main) Branch of the Halifax Public Libraries system).

As Canada was preparing for its centennial year, federal matching funds were made available to provincial and municipal governments to undertake significant public projects (see Canadian Centennial). Frustrated that the Nova Scotia Museum was overlooked for such funding in favor of a competing initiative, Crowdis moved to Toronto in 1965. There he became a member of the executive team which oversaw the establishment of the “Centennial Centre of Science and Technology” which would come to be known as the Ontario Science Centre. He afterwards worked for the Ontario Education Communications Authority. He consulted in later years.

=== Broadcasting ===
As part of his outreach efforts with the Nova Scotia museum, Crowdis embraced the medium of radio, appearing on local radio programs in Halifax for more than two decades. One of his shows was called "Things of Nature". When it transitioned to television, he adapted the name as The Nature of Things He was an early host of the popular CBC television series, which continues to air new episodes as The Nature of Things with David Suzuki.

=== Blogger ===
Late in his life (from age 91 to 95), he wrote a blog named Don To Earth, making him Canada's, and one of the world's, oldest bloggers. His brief blogs, which he kept "no longer than a page," were principally meditations on Instincts of the Herd in Peace and War by Wilfred Trotter. Said, Crowdis, "this column is for the single purpose of urging my readers to read it. I have read it myself several times a year for over thirty years. I'll stop this now, and you go read."

== Honours ==
- Recipient of the Canadian Centennial Medal
- Fellow, Canadian Museums Association
- Fellow, Royal Society of Arts
- Fellow, Ontario Institute for Studies in Education
- Nova Scotia Discovery Centre Hall of Fame.
