= Harry Piers =

Canadian historian (1870–1940)

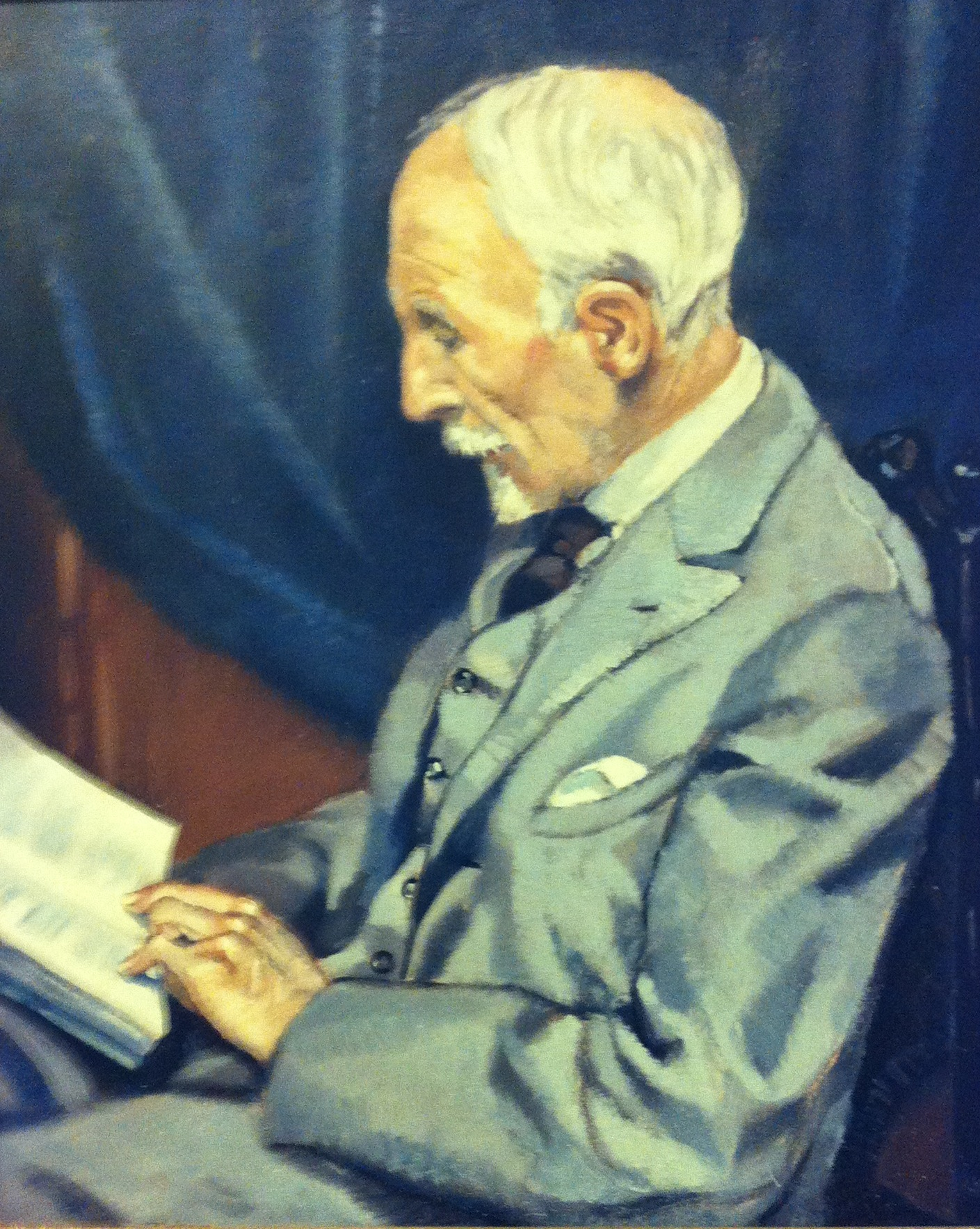
- Harry Piers, Harry Piers Room, Nova Scotia Museum of Natural History
- Born: February 12, 1870; Halifax, Nova Scotia
- Died: January 24, 1940 (aged 69)
- Occupation: Historian
- Spouse: Constance Fairbanks

Harry Piers (1870–1940) was a Canadian historian. He was a long-serving and influential historian and curator at the Nova Scotia Museum in Halifax, Nova Scotia. Piers was born on February 12, 1870, in Halifax.

He became the second curator of the Nova Scotia Museum in 1899, when he succeeded David Honeyman. Piers also served as librarian of the Provincial Science Library from 1900 and as Deputy Keeper of Public Records of Nova Scotia from 1899 until 1931, when the Public Archives of Nova Scotia opened. He did extensive work with Jerry Lonecloud documenting Mi'kmaq people's culture and history. He died on January 24, 1940, and is buried in Halifax at Camp Hill Cemetery. He was succeeded as curator of the Nova Scotia Museum by Donald Crowdis.

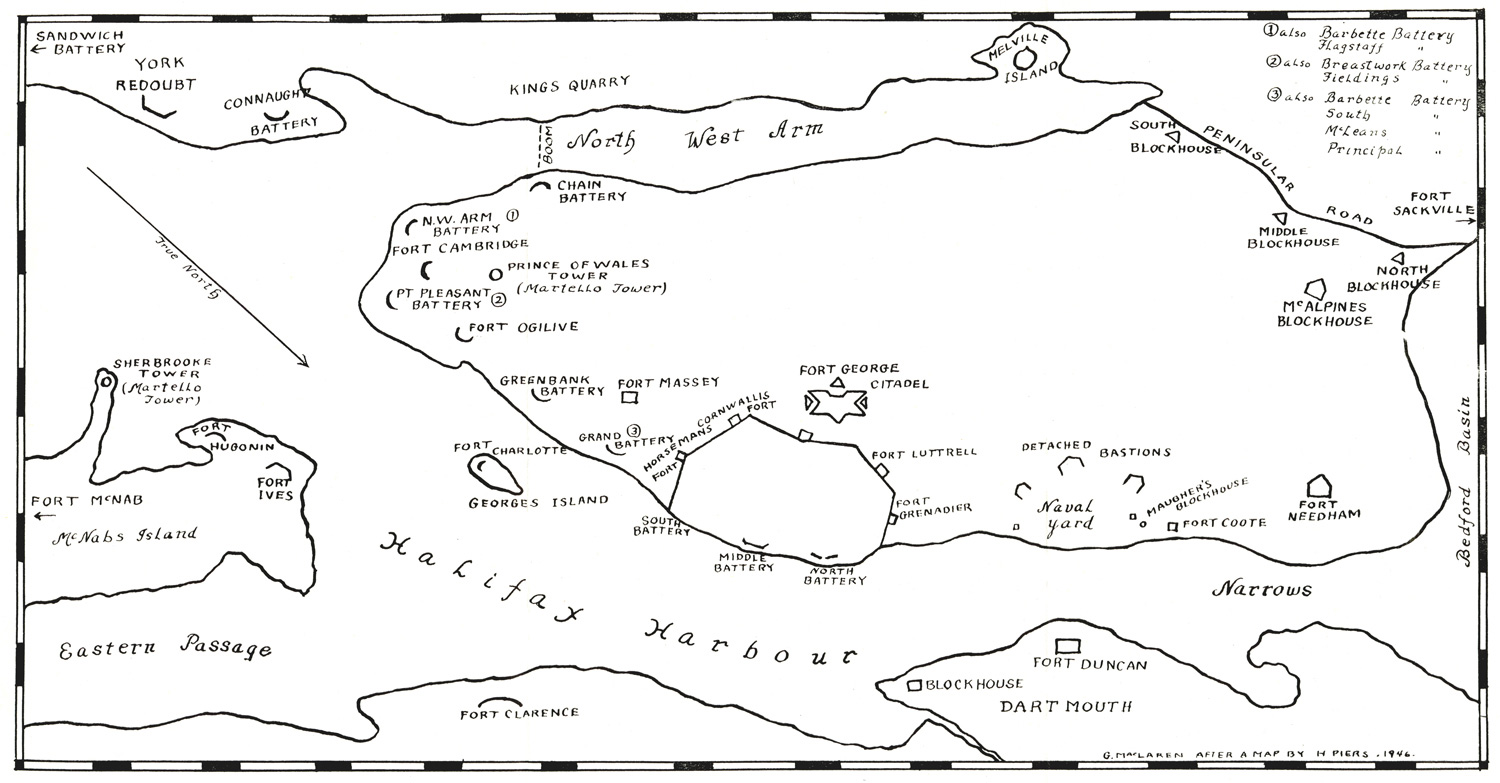
Piers influential mapping of Halifax defences in The Evolution of the Halifax Fortress

Piers was an active writer, publishing on a wide range of subjects, from the history of the military to the habits of the winter wren, a tiny bird found in Nova Scotia forests. His last book, The Evolution of the Halifax Fortress 1749-1928, was published in 1947 just after his death and played a key role in restoring the Halifax Citadel and York Redoubt.

Piers was also known for his assistance to other authors. In 1893, he edited Mary Jane Katzmann's Akins Prize-winning History of the Townships of Dartmouth, Preston and Lawrencetown, Halifax County, N.S. posthumously for publication. History and fiction writer Thomas Raddall received crucial encouragement and assistance from Piers, who became Raddall's mentor for historical research.

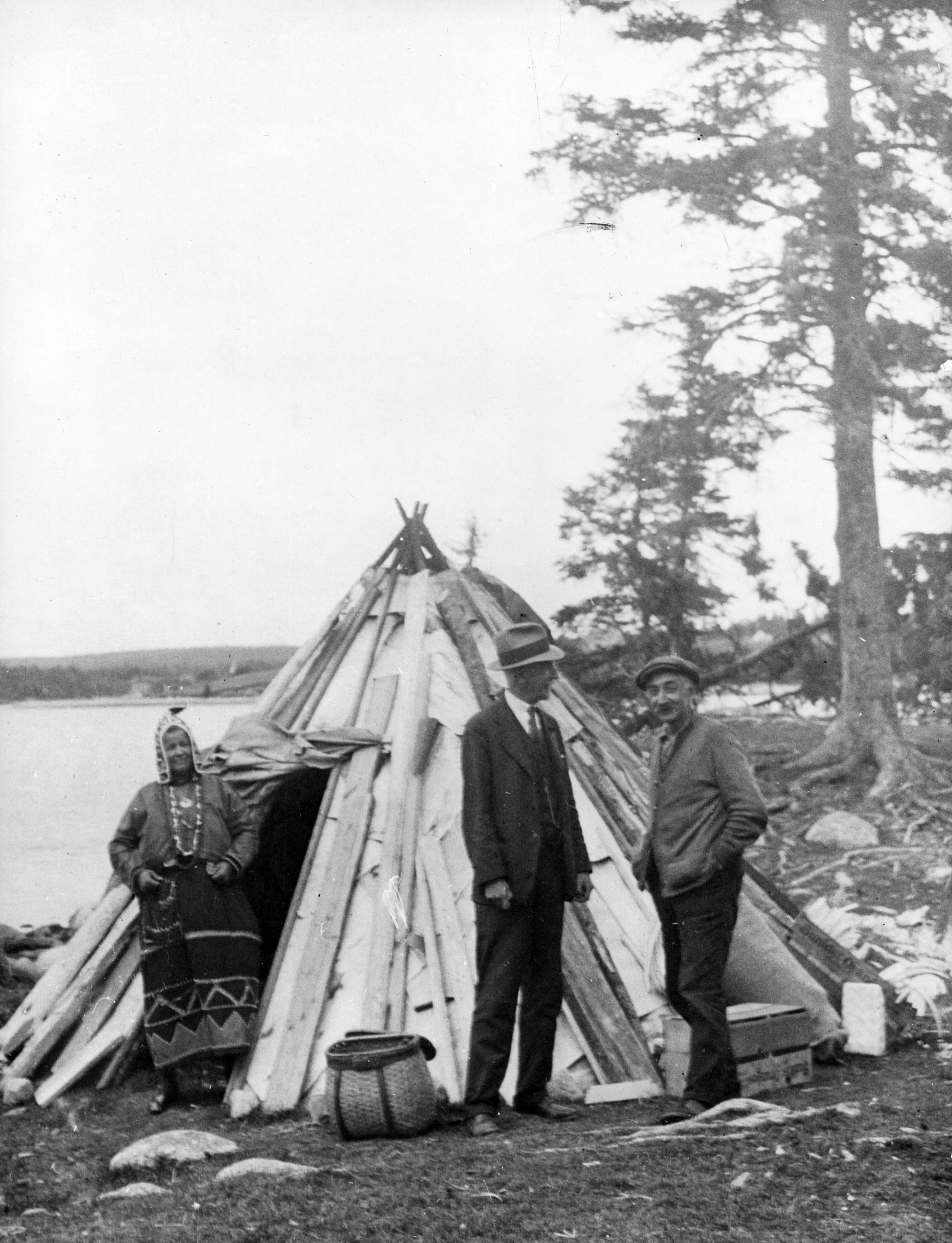
Harry Piers (centre) conducting field work with a Mi'kmaw family

Piers worked with precision and diligence for many years as virtually a one-man museum for Nova Scotia. His obituary in the Halifax Chronicle Herald noted, "Many called him a 'human book of knowledge'. His tall stately figure was familiar in the community life of Halifax, and he played a prominent role in numerous activities in the City and Province.". Piers' museum work was multi-disciplinary, collecting artifacts and specimens for human and natural history. His collection documentation set high standards of research and description that were ahead of their time and stand out today as instructive examples of museum work. A Parks Canada historian in recent times lauded him as a "renaissance man of this province's cultural history. It matters not where the modern researcher penetrates — history, archaeology, material culture, geology, botany — it is almost certain that you will find his footprint of decades ago. At a time when nobody else cared, he and his museum did, and between them they preserved and recorded much that would otherwise have vanished utterly."

He was a long-term member of the Royal Nova Scotia Historical Society.

== Selected works ==
- Piers, Harry, Robert Field: Portrait Painter in Oils, Miniature and Water-Colours and Engraver, New York, 1927.
- Harry Piers. Artists of Nova Scotia. Nova Scotia Historical Society. 1914.
- Harry Piers, "The Fortieth Regiment, Raised at Annapolis Royal in 1717; And Five Regiments Subsequently Raised in Nova Scotia," Nova Scotia Historical Society (1927)
- Piers, Harry, The Evolution of the Halifax Fortress 1749-1928, Public Archives of Nova Scotia, 1947
- Piers, Harry The Evolution of the Halifax Fortress 1749-1928. University of Calgary.
- Harry Piers.Relics of the stone age in Nova Scotia (1896)
- Leading Citizens NS
- Harry Piers, "The Old Peninsular Blockhouses and Road at Halifax, 1751; Their History, Description and Location," Collections of the Nova Scotia Historical Society, Vol. 22, Halifax

== Legacy ==
- Piers Avenue, Halifax, Nova Scotia
