= Gus (tortoise) =

104-year-old gopher tortoise

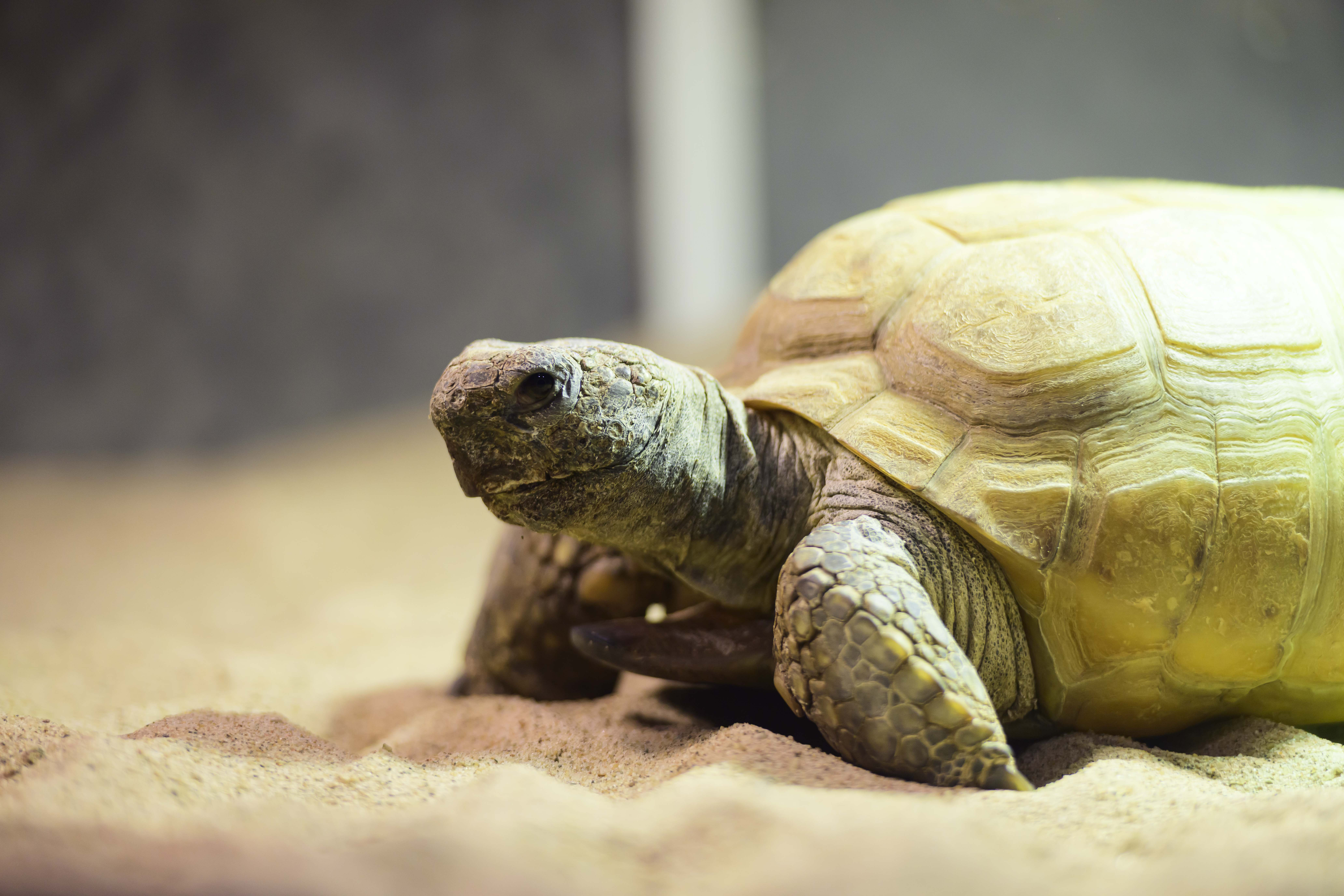
- Gus in March 2026
- Species: Gopher tortoise (Gopherus polyphemus)
- Sex: Male
- Hatched: c. 1922 (age 103–104); Florida
- Residence: Nova Scotia Museum of Natural History
- Named after: John Augustus Gilhen

Gus is a 104-year-old gopher tortoise living at the Nova Scotia Museum of Natural History, considered to be an icon of Halifax. He has been asserted to be the world's oldest living gopher tortoise.

== Life ==
Gus began his life in Florida around 1922, and spent his early days at the Ross Allen Reptile Institute in Silver Springs. The precise day which he hatched is unknown, but his birthday is celebrated in August. In 1942, he was purchased for five dollars by Don Crowdis, the director of the Nova Scotia Provincial Museum. Crowdis returned Gus to Nova Scotia, where he began living at the Nova Scotia Museum of Natural History. Gopher tortoises typically only live to be around 60 years old, and Gus's longevity is attributed to a lack of external threats. He has been said to be the world's oldest living gopher tortoise.

Originally, Gus would roam freely throughout the museum, but he is now kept in an enclosure when he is not out for a walk. When he was still walking the halls freely, he would sometimes exit the museum and wander onto Spring Garden Road, until a passerby returned him. Some sources claim he went missing for an indeterminate length of time in the early 1950s, though this has been disputed by the museum's former zoology curator.

A birthday celebration was held for Gus for the first time in 1980. To commemorate the occasion, a portrait of Gus was painted by the Lower Sackville artist Michael Gaudet. The portrait depicts Gus wearing a stetson.

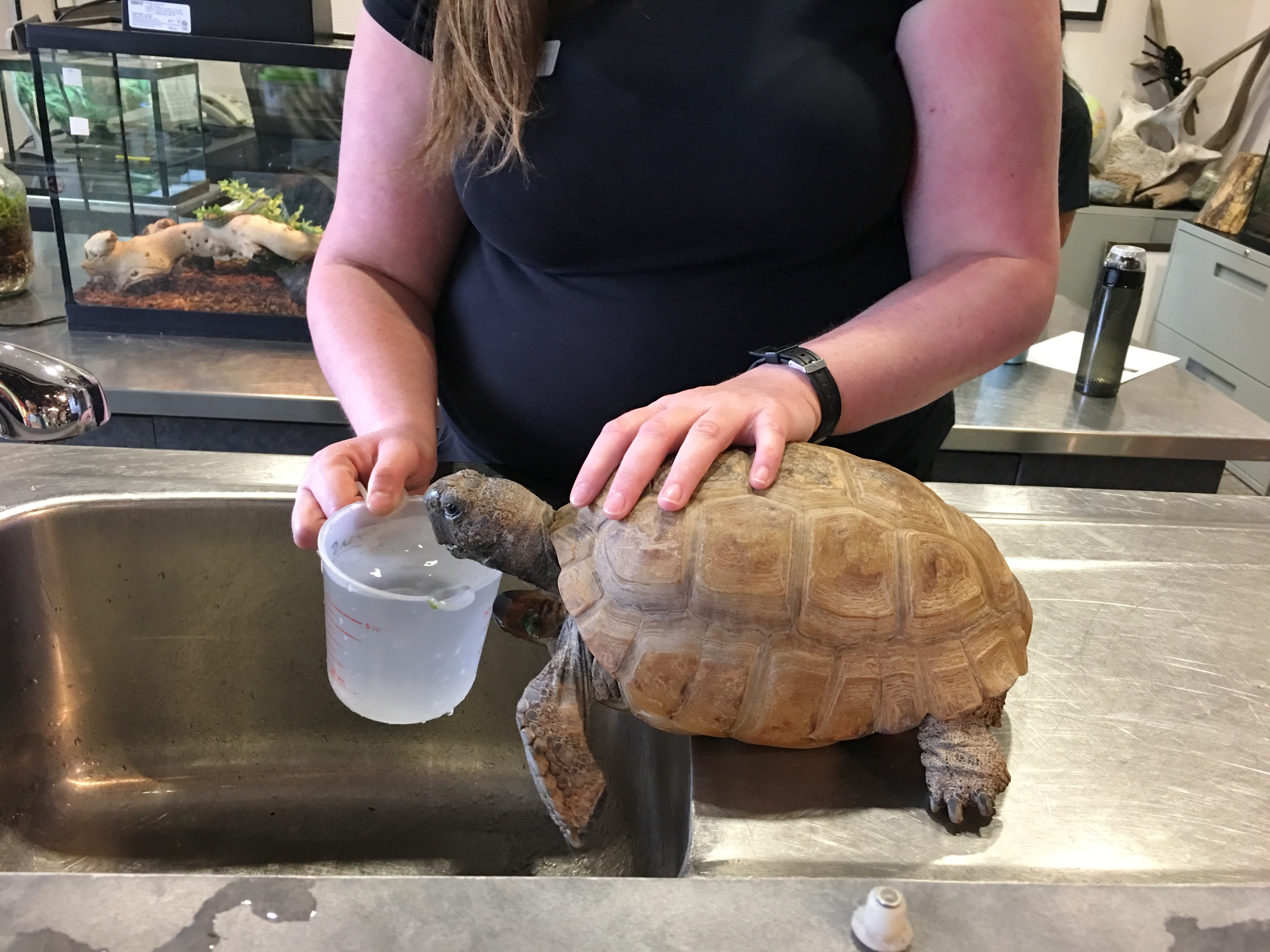
Gus having a drink (2019 photo)

Gus can be found on supervised walks through the museum halls, and is no longer allowed to be touched by visitors. During nice weather, Gus will roam in the backyard of the museum. He visited the Halifax Public Gardens to take a walk in 2025. His favourite foods are blueberries, bananas, and romaine lettuce. He also loves grasses and clovers, as well as fresh dandelions.

Gus received his name in 1952. He is named after John Augustus Gilhen, who devoted his time to helping at the museum throughout the 1950s. Gus had a particular fondness for Gilhen, who would give him snacks. Having lived at the museum for so long, Gus is considered to be an icon of Halifax. In 2018, the Halifax newspaper The Coast nominated Gus for the Order of Nova Scotia.

In October 2026 Gus underwent a successful surgery to remove a bladder stone.

== Media ==
Gus the Tortoise Takes a Walk is a children's book featuring Gus, published in 2012 by Nimbus Publishing. Written by Erin Arsenault and illustrated by Richard Rudnicki, the book tells the story of his first day at the museum.

Gus was again the subject of a children's book in Nova Scotia Loves Gus, published in 2024 by Acorn Press. The book tells the story of his life, written and illustrated by Doretta Groenendyk.
