= Ceratophaga vicinella =

Scientific classification
- Kingdom: Animalia
- Phylum: Arthropoda
- Class: Insecta
- Order: Lepidoptera
- Family: Tineidae
- Genus: Ceratophaga
- Species: C. vicinella

Binomial name
- Ceratophaga vicinella Dietz, 1905

Species of moth

Ceratophaga vicinella is a species of moth belonging to the family Tineidae. It is found in the southeastern United States.

== Description ==
The adult is a fairly typical tineid, blackish brown with a tiny white spot on each forewing and a prominent tuft of cream-colored hair on the head.

== Distribution ==
The species has a restricted range in the southeastern United States, mainly in Florida and Mississippi.

== Ecology ==
This species appears to be in decline, almost certainly because the gopher tortoise (Gopherus polyphemus) is under threat; the moth relies on the tortoise in a unique way. All Ceratophaga larvae feed, uniquely among Lepidoptera, on solid keratin. Most species feed on the horns and hooves of dead ungulates but C. vicinella feeds exclusively on the shells of dead gopher tortoises.

The larvae of C. vicinella, whitish with a dark brown head, feed gregariously on the keratin shells and construct a mass of silk tubes on the underside which act as anchors, penetrating the soil to a depth of 10 cm, possibly also serving to protect the larvae from temperature extremes and parasitoids. They feed, and eventually pupate, within the protection of these tubes.
