= Mary Jane Katzmann =

Canadian author, editor, historian and poet

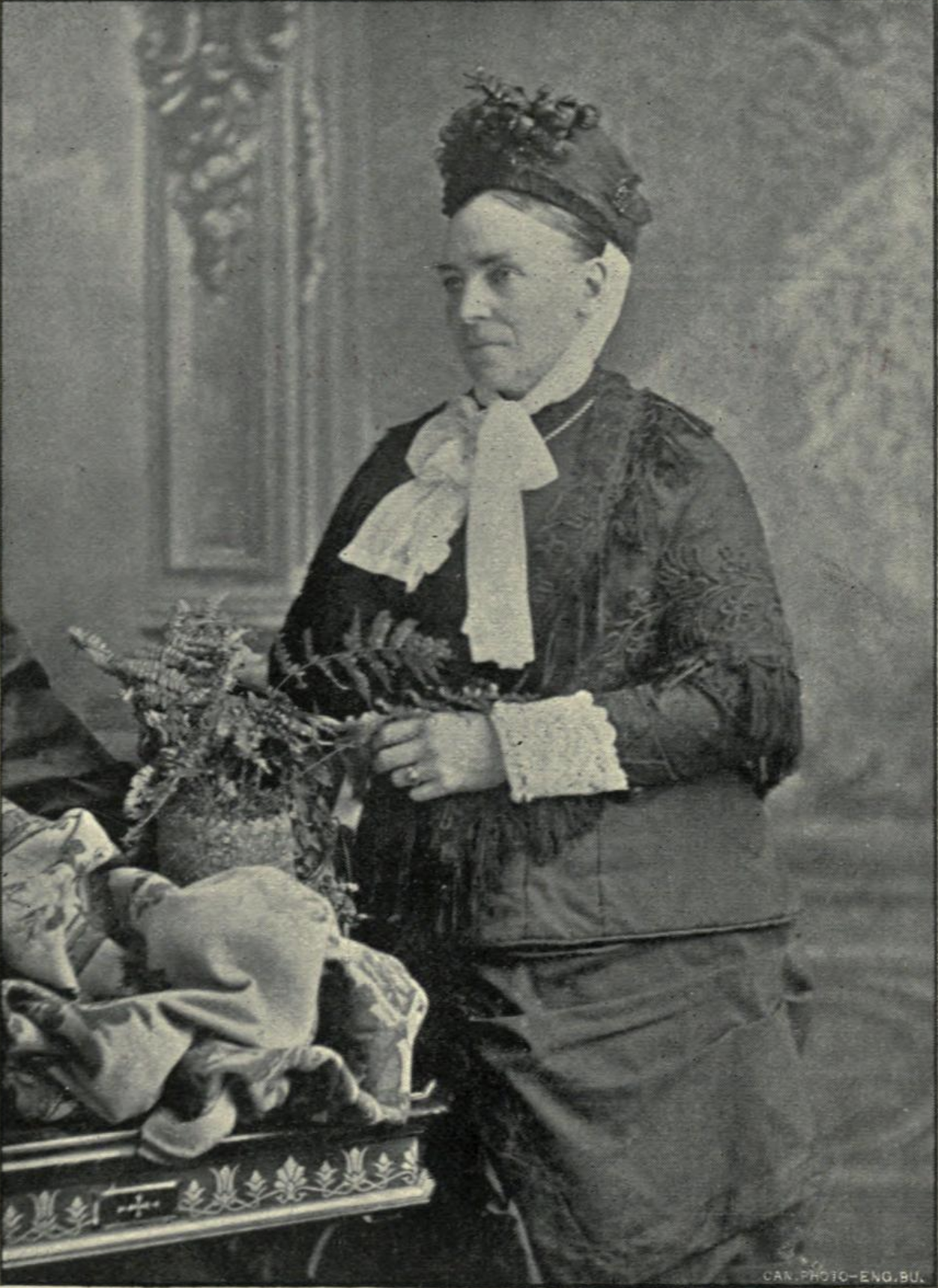
- Born: January 15, 1828; Preston, Nova Scotia, Canada
- Died: March 23, 1890 (aged 62); Halifax, Nova Scotia, Canada
- Citizenship: British subject
- Occupations: author, editor, historian, poet
- Spouse: William Lawson (m. 1869)
- Writing career
- Pen name: M. J. K.; M. J. K. L.
- Language: English
- Notable works: Frankincense and Myrrh, History of the Townships ...
- Notable awards: Akins Historical Prize

Mary Jane Katzmann (also known as, Mrs. William Lawson; sobriquet, M. J. K. and later, M. J. K. L.; January 15, 1828 – March 23, 1890) was a Canadian writer, editor, historian, and poet. Publishing short poems from time to time, she went on to become a regular contributor to various periodicals and newspapers, including the Colonist, the Record, and the Guardian. For two years, she edited the Provincial Magazine, one of the earliest of its kind published in Halifax, Nova Scotia. For this, she wrote "Tales of our Village,"—sketches of the early history of Dartmouth and Preston interwoven with local traditions. She invariably signed all she wrote with her initials, M. J. K., and by this sobriquet, became well known to all her friends.

In 1869, she married William Lawson, Esq., of Halifax, in which town she was then living. After her marriage, her time was largely given to work among the poor, and to social and benevolent schemes, particularly those connected with the Church of England, of which she was a devoted member. She preserved to the end of her life that love for literary work which she had early displayed, and any event of interest in the community was sure to call forth sympathetic lines which were now signed with the initials M. J. K. L. In 1887, she obtained the Akins Historical Prize of King's College, Windsor, for her History of the, Townxhi* of Dartmouth, Preston, and Lawrencetown. She died at Halifax, on Sunday, March 23, 1890, after several weeks of painful illness, leaving one child, a daughter.

== Early life and education ==
Mary Jane Katzmann was born at "Maroon Hall" in Preston, Nova Scotia, the second daughter of Mary Prescott and Lieutenant Christian Conrad Casper Katzmann. Her father, who was a native of Hanover, Germany, came to Nova Scotia with H. M. 60th Regiment, or King's German Legion, in which he was a Lieutenant. earned a British Army commission in the Peninsular War. When he left the regiment, about 1822, he settled in Preston, where he resided until his death on December 15, 1843. Her mother was a Nova Scotian, a granddaughter of Dr. Jonathan Prescott, of Massachusetts, who came to Nova Scotia and settled there with other New England Loyalists. Through him the family claims relationship with the historian Prescott.

From a very early age, Katzmann showed unusual intelligence and signs of that love for literature which always characterized her. She could read at the age of three, and from that time devoured eagerly the limited number of books which were at her disposal in Maroon Hall. Scott's Tales of a Grandfather and Chambers Journal were her especial favourites. Owing to the remoteness of the country district in which she lived, educational advantages were few; and, save for the help given by her own family, she was almost entirely self-taught. Her quickness of perception and wonderful memory no doubt compensated to a great extent for the lack of other advantages.led there with other New England Loyalists. Through him the family claims relationship with the historian Prescott.

== Career ==
In 1845, her poetry came to the attention of Joseph Howe, who praised it in his "Nights with the Muses" column in The Nova Scotian. Between 1848 and 1851, Katzmann published a large amount of verse in the Halifax Guardian.

In January 1852, she became editor of The Provincial, a new literary journal, "and under her expert guidance it became possibly the best of the early Nova Scotian periodicals. The format and printing were superior, and the quality of the contributions was commendable.... Katzmann tailored her publication to attract a wide audience, both male and female; she also strove to include articles of regional origin rather than selected reprints."

The magazine "was well received by its readers but sufficient subscriptions were not forthcoming, and publication ceased with the December 1853 issue. Nothing further is known of the editor until 1866, when she was operating the Provincial Bookstore in Halifax."

In 1869, Katzmann married Halifax businessman William Lawson. She turned over the bookstore to her sister, and became a proper non-working Victorian wife (though she continued to write). She spent much time on "charitable and social causes, particularly those associated with the Church of England." They had one daughter.

Lawson worked a series she had written in the Provincial, "Tales of Our Village," into the book, History of the Townships of Dartmouth, Preston and Lawrencetown, Halifax County, N.S., for which she won the Akins Historical Prize from King's College in 1887.

She died of cancer in Halifax in 1890.

Her two books, Frankincense and Myrrh (a collection of her poetry) and History of the Townships of Dartmouth, Preston, and Lawrencetown, Halifax County, N.S.," were published posthumously in 1893, edited by poet Constance Fairbanks and historian Harry Piers.

== Reception ==
"As a poet Katzmann was prone to generalities, melodramatic effects, and dull religious and moral didacticism — characteristics that mark the verse of contemporary ‘female poets’ in Britain and the United States upon whom she patterned herself," says the Oxford Companion to Canadian Literature, "but she was always technically competent, at her best when writing descriptive verse or charming song-like lyrics."

The Dictionary of Canadian Biography (DCBO) calls her prize-winning historical study, History of the Townships of Dartmouth, Preston and Lawrencetown, Halifax County, N.S., "her enduring contribution to Canadian literature. Although it relies heavily on description and anecdote, and reads much like a Victorian travelogue, the book nevertheless reveals a fine sense of historical detail and comprehension." As well, "although it can in no way be compared to a modern sociological study, it does convey, in a fashion which many early regional histories lack, a colourful sense of the people and the times."

== Recognition ==
The DCBO says of Katzmann's career: "In an age when women accomplished little beyond the circle of home and charity, her success, although limited to the provincial sphere, was threefold: as the capable and youthful editor of a successful, if short-lived, periodical, as an able businesswoman in a circle dominated by male initiative, and as one of the first native Nova Scotian women to achieve literary recognition, and certainly the first to make an enduring impression."

== Selected works ==
- Frankincense and Myrrh: Selections from the poems of the late Mrs. William Lawson (M.J.K.L.). Harry Piers and Constance Fairbanks ed. Halifax, 1893. (poetry)
- History of the Townships of Dartmouth, Preston, and Lawrencetown, Harry Piers ed. Halifax, 1893. Halifax: Morton, 1980. (prose)
- Provincial, or Halifax Monthly Magazine, 1852–53. (edited)

(Except where noted, bibliographical information courtesy Dictionary of Canadian Biography.)
