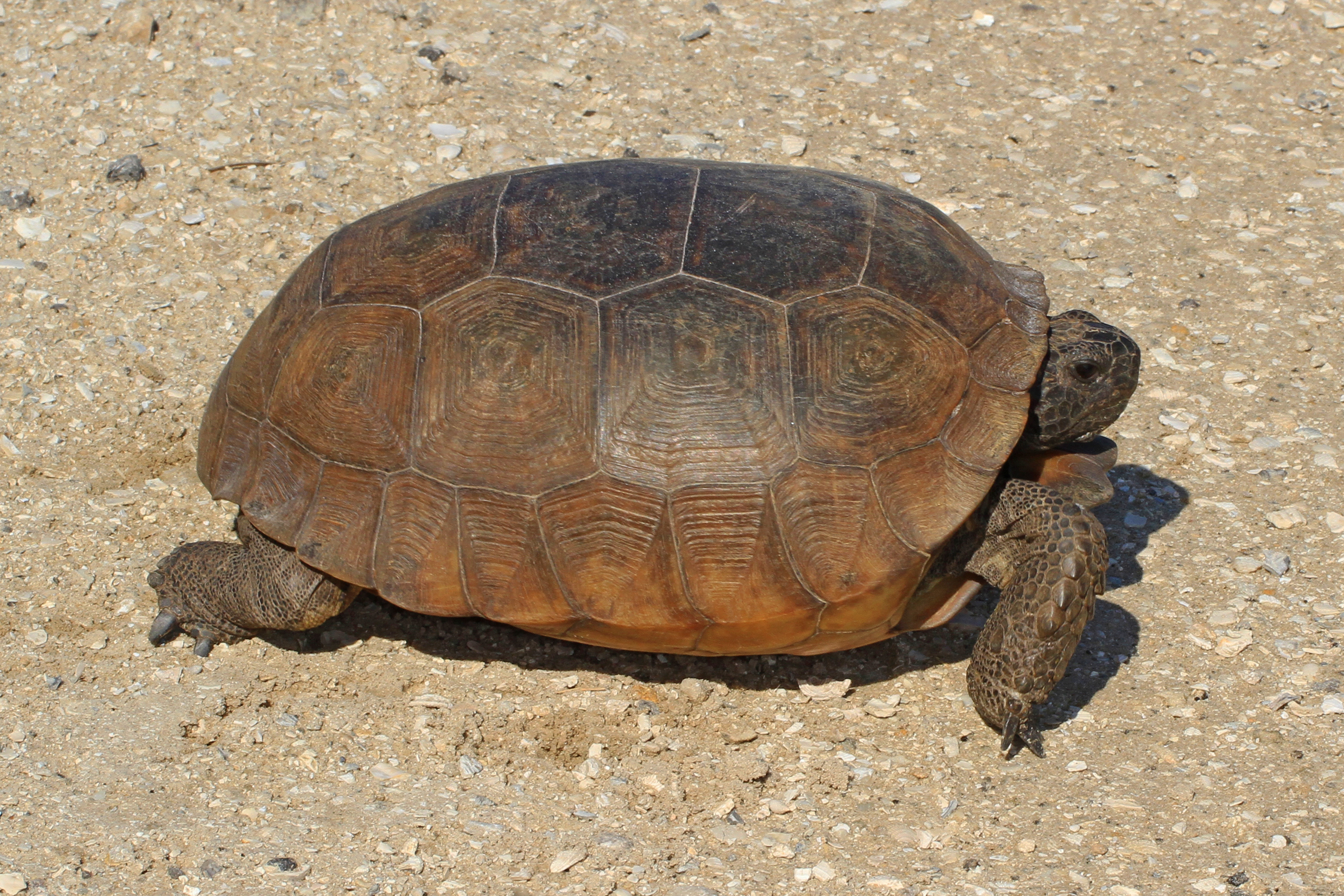
- In Highlands County, Florida, U.S.

Conservation status
- Critically Endangered (IUCN 3.1)
- CITES Appendix II

Scientific classification
- Kingdom: Animalia
- Phylum: Chordata
- Class: Reptilia
- Order: Testudines
- Suborder: Cryptodira
- Family: Testudinidae
- Genus: Gopherus
- Species: G. polyphemus

Binomial name
- Gopherus polyphemus Daudin, 1802
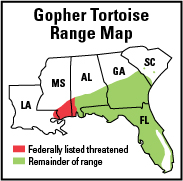

Synonyms
- List: Testudo polyphaemus Bartram, 1791 (nomen nudum); Testudo polyphemus Daudin, 1801; Emys polyphemus — Schweigger, 1812; Testudo depressa Cuvier in Guérin-Méneville, 1829; Gopherus polyphemus — Rafinesque, 1832; Testudo gopher Gray, 1844; Xerobates gopher — Gray, 1873; Xerobates polyphemus — True, 1881; Gopherus praecedens O.P. Hay, 1916; Gopherus polyphemus polyphemus — Mertens & Wermuth, 1955

= Gopher tortoise =

Species of reptile

The gopher tortoise (Gopherus polyphemus) is a species of tortoise in the family Testudinidae. The species is native to the Southeastern United States. The gopher tortoise is seen as a keystone species because it digs burrows that provide shelter for at least 360 other animal species. G. polyphemus is threatened by predation and habitat destruction. The IUCN Red List of Threatened Species lists the gopher tortoise as "critically endangered," primarily because of habitat fragmentation and loss, and human exploitation; the animals are considered threatened in some states, while they are endangered in others.

The gopher tortoise is placed in the genus Gopherus, which contains the only tortoises native to North America. The gopher tortoise is the state reptile of Georgia and the state tortoise of Florida.

== Etymology ==
Tortoises of the genus Gopherus are so named because of some species' habit of digging large, deep burrows like those of gophers. The specific name, polyphemus, refers to the cave-dwelling giant, Polyphemus, of Greek mythology.

== Description ==
The gopher tortoise is a terrestrial reptile that possesses forefeet that are well adapted for burrowing, and elephantine hind feet. These features are common to most tortoises. The front legs have scales to protect the tortoise while burrowing. G. polyphemus is dark brown to gray-black in overall color, with a yellow plastron (bottom shell). A gular projection is evident on the anterior plastron where the head projects from the shell. Sexual dimorphism is evident, with the male gopher tortoise having a concave plastron, while that of the female is flat. In addition, the gular projection of a male plastron is generally longer than that of a female. Straight carapace lengths of adults usually range from 6 to 11 in (15 to 28 cm), with a maximum of 17.32 in (44.0 cm). The carapace is at least twice as long as it is high. Anal width (distance between the extreme posterior points of the anal shields) and anal notch (distance between the posterior end of the plastron at midline and the posterior edge of the carapace) are dimorphic, but does not become distinctly dimorphic until sexual maturity is attained. Body mass averages 4 kg (8.8 lb), with a range of 2–6 kg (4.4–13.2 lb). They are the only extant species of the genus Gopherus found east of the Mississippi River.

== Behavior ==
=== Diet ===
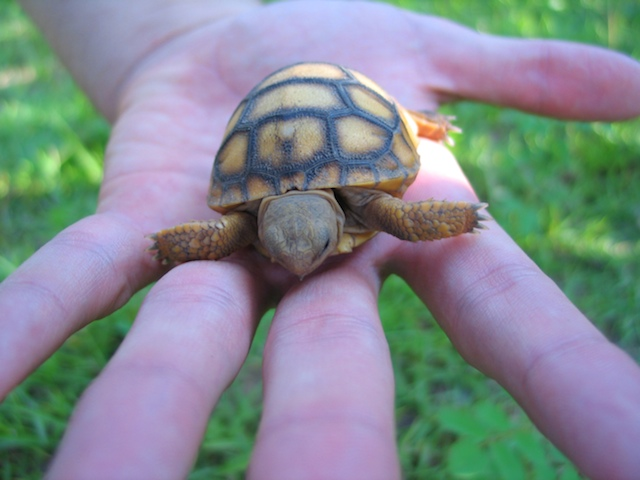
Carapaces of hatchlings are yellow, but they take on a darker color as they mature.

Gopher tortoises are herbivore scavengers and opportunistic grazers. Thus, their diets contains over 300 species of plants, with the dominant plants within their environment likely making up the bulk of their diet. They consume a very wide range of plants, but mainly eat broad-leaved grass, regular grass, wiregrass, and terrestrial legumes. However, other plant parts, including shoots, stems, leaves, and pine needles are also eaten. They also eat mushrooms, and fruits such as gopher apple, pawpaw, blackberries, and saw palmetto berries. In addition, gopher tortoises eat flowers from the genera Cnidoscolus (nettles), Tillandsia (Spanish and ball moss), Richardia, and Dyschoriste. A very small portion of the tortoises' diet is composed of fungi, lichens, carrion, bones, insects, and feces, eaten more commonly by females before and after nesting time. Juvenile tortoises tend to eat more legumes, which are higher in protein, and fewer grasses and tough, fibrous plants than mature tortoises. As gopher tortoises usually get water from the food they eat, they usually only drink standing water in times of extreme drought. During wetter seasons, gopher tortoises have been known switch to a more frugivorous diet, seeking out fruits when they are more plentiful. Fruits, being high in sugar and other easily digestible carbohydrates, provide the energy needed for gopher tortoises to mate and burrow.

=== Burrowing ===
Gopher tortoises, like other tortoises of the genus Gopherus, are known for their digging ability. They spend most of their time (up to 80%) in long burrows. On average, these burrows are 15 feet (4.6 m) long and 6.5 feet (2.0 m) deep, but can extend up to 48 feet (15 m) in length and 9.8 feet (3.0 m) deep. The length and depth of the burrow vary with the depth of sand and depth of the water table. In these burrows, the tortoises are protected from summer heat, winter cold, fire, and predators, and a variety of activities happen within the burrow and its apron, such as courting and basking in the sun. The burrows are especially common in longleaf pine savannas, where the tortoises are the primary grazers, playing an essential role in their ecosystem. Except during breeding season, gopher tortoises are solitary animals, inhabiting a small home range. Within their range, they dig several burrows. On average, each gopher tortoise needs about 4 acres (16,000 m^{2}) to live. In addition to providing a shelter for themselves, gopher tortoise burrows are used by 60 vertebrate species and 300 invertebrate species, including many rare species (i.e. eastern indigo snake, gopher frog, and Florida mouse). The term that describes these species, as well as others that use the burrows, is "commensals". Because of the importance of their burrows, gopher tortoises are known as keystone species; without them, the biodiversity of their respective ecosystems will deteriorate.

=== Movement ===
The species is known to move short distances when foraging and seems to stay within 100 m or less, but when on the hunt for a new foraging site, gopher tortoises may travel up to 2 miles. Their activity levels vary depending on temperature, with activity increasing alongside the spring and summer's warmer months.

=== Life span ===
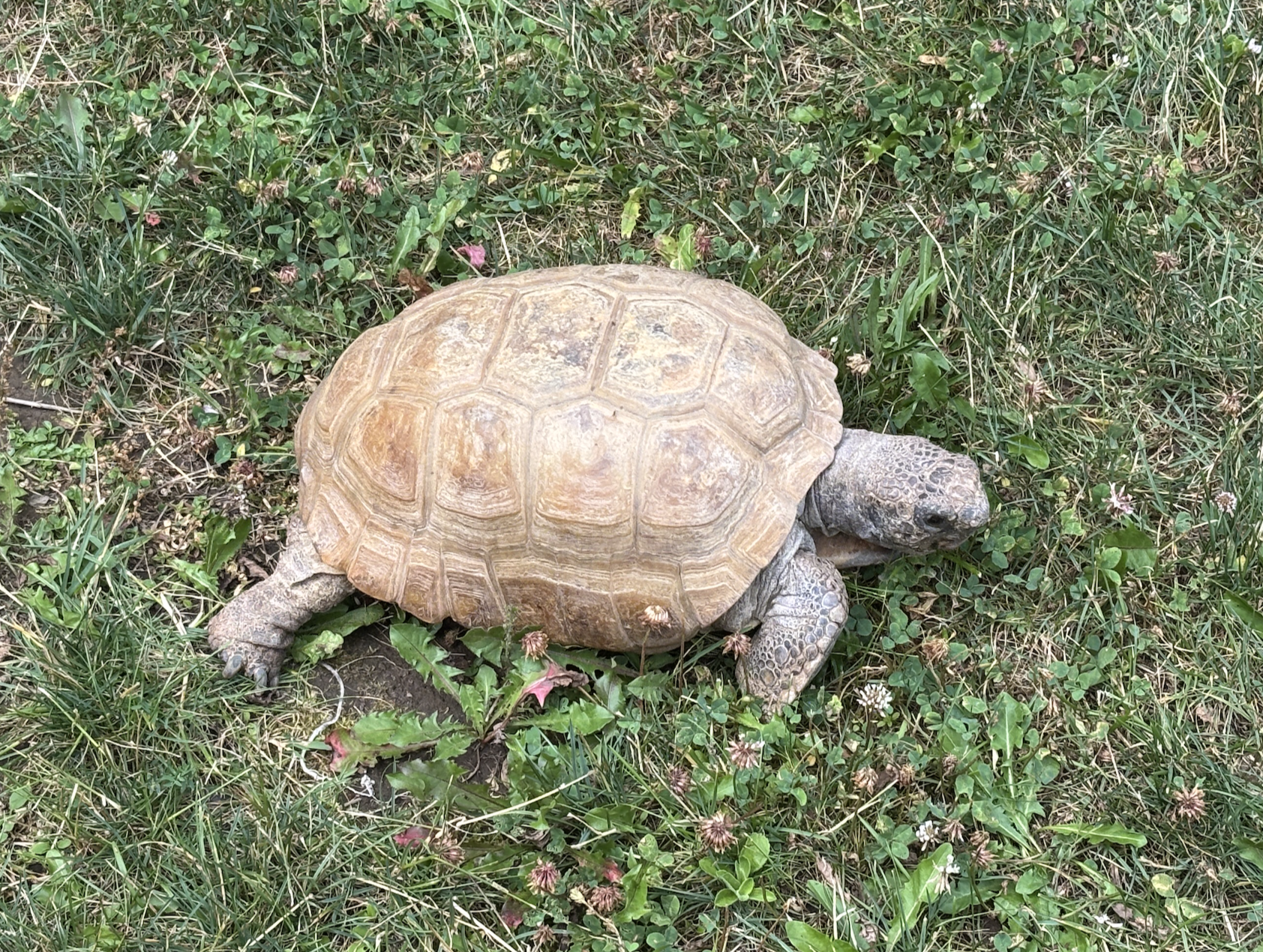
Gus, now 103 years old, going for a walk

Gopher tortoises can live more than 40 years. One current specimen, Gus (age 104—the oldest known living gopher tortoise—as of 2026), has been living continuously in captivity at the Nova Scotia Museum of Natural History in Halifax for 84 years as of 2026 and is believed to have hatched between 1920 and 1925. Additionally, a specimen in North Texas reportedly has a verified age of 75–78 years old.

The gopher tortoise reaches maturity around 10–15 years of age, when its shell is around 9 in (23 cm) long. Male tortoises reach adulthood around 9–12 years of age, and females take up to 10–21 years to reach maturity. Maturation time may vary based on local resource abundance and latitude. Gopher tortoises prefer to live solitary lifestyles, burrowing alone and only breaking this during mating season

=== Breeding and reproduction ===
Courtship ritual and mating

Mating

Gopher tortoises reach sexual maturity between 9 and 20 years of age, depending on sex and what region the species chooses to populate. Sexual reproduction involves courtship rituals. During the mating season, females only produce one clutch annually between April and November, females lay up to 25 eggs. The clutch size is positively correlated with female plastron length. These clutches are incubated underground for 70–100 days. The sex of the eggs is determined by the temperature where they are incubated in a nest laid below sand. If the sand is over 30 °C, hatchlings are female and if below 30 °C, they are male. Incubation can last from 80 to 90 days in Florida and 110 days in South Carolina. The eggs stay in the uterus of the female for 60 days until oviposition occurs; they their uterine epithelium to supply "pumping water" and transport important nutrients to the eggs.

Gopher tortoises may mate from February through September, with a peak throughout May and June. Females typically lay clutches of 3–14 eggs, but can lay up to 25, depending on body size, in a sandy mound very close to the entrance of their burrow. Reproduction rates and clutch sizes are positively impacted by higher temperatures. Warmer temperatures stimulate a female gopher tortoise's endocrine system, which helps trigger vitellogenesis, or yolk formation.

About 90% of clutches may be destroyed by predators such as armadillos, raccoons, foxes, skunks, and alligators before the eggs hatch, and fewer than 6% of eggs are expected to grow into tortoises that live one year or more after hatching. As the tortoises age, they have fewer natural predators. Egg predation rates are unchanged regardless of whether nests are close to or remain far from burrows. Additionally, a denser soil composition may affect hatchlings' ability to emerge due to their apparent inability to dig themselves out of the nest.

Each hatchling has a straight carapace length of 1–2 in (2.5–5.1 cm).

=== Social behavior ===
Gopher tortoises, more than other tortoise species, are thought to exhibit social behavior. While primarily solitary creatures, they live in well-defined colonies that are similar to those of highly social animals such as the prairie dog. The distribution and proximity of burrows might be the consequence of social relationships between tortoises. Both males and females have been found to use chemical signals to communicate with each other. These chemical signals are secreted from the tortoises' mental gland on their chins.

Some females have been observed visiting the burrows of a particular female repeatedly, even if other tortoises are nearby. This may be a sort of "friendship", but such terms are not normally used to describe the relationships between animals. Female gopher tortoises generally do not relocate once they have moved into a colony, and larger males usually have their burrows adjacent to females in the spring. Males can travel up to 500 m (1,600 ft) to visit females and their burrows. Juvenile gopher tortoises have been known to occasionally cohabitate burrows, but this hinders their ability to escape or deter predators. If one juvenile blocks another from entering or moving within the burrow, aggression and occasionally combat may ensue.

== Conservation concerns ==
=== Historically ===
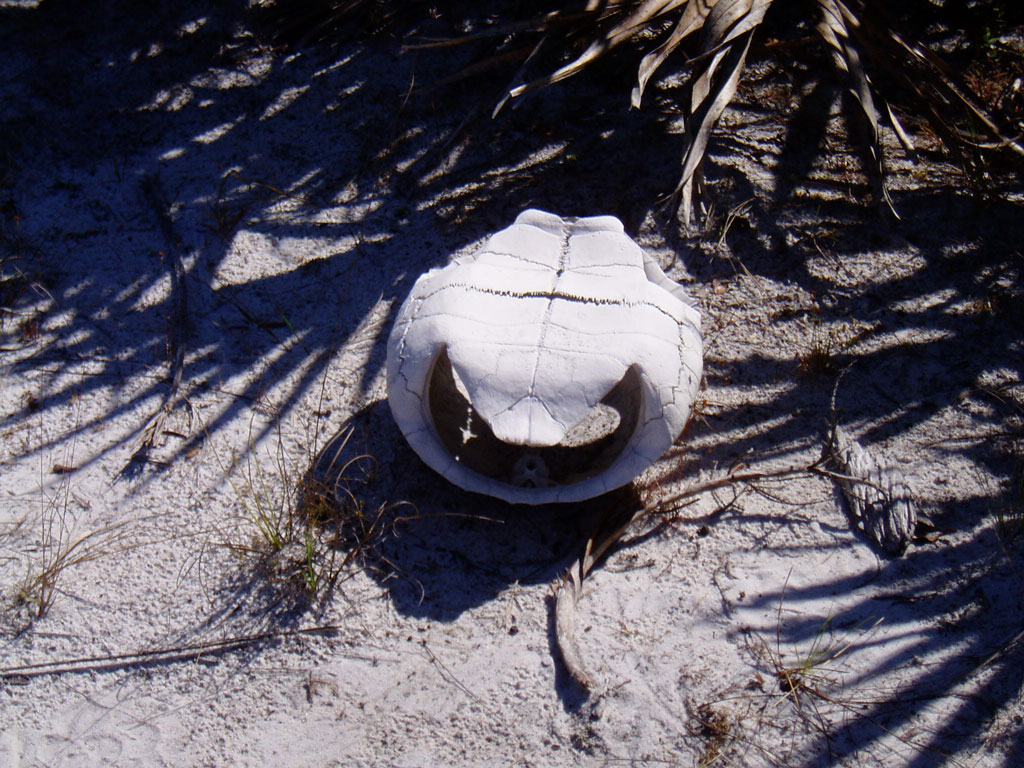
Bleached shell of dead gopher tortoise

Since July 7, 1987, the U.S. Fish and Wildlife Service (FWS) has listed Gopherus polyphemus as "threatened" wherever the tortoises are found west of the Mobile and Tombigbee Rivers in Alabama, Mississippi, and Louisiana. On November 9, 2009, the FWS proposed rulemaking to include the eastern population of G. polyphemus in the List of Threatened Wildlife. In October 2022, the FWS announced that the species overall and its eastern distinct population segment (DPS) did not warrant listing at that time. G. polyphemus appears on the IUCN Red List as a "Vulnerable" species; however, it has not been assessed for the purposes of this list since 1996. In July 2011, the FWS determined that listing the eastern DPS as threatened under the Endangered Species Act is warranted, but it is precluded from doing so at this time due to higher priority actions and a lack of sufficient funds to commence proposed rule development. In the interim, the FWS would place the eastern DPS on its candidate species list until sufficient funding is available to initiate a proposed listing rule. In 2018, the IUCN Tortoise and Freshwater Turtle Specialist Group recommended a reassessment and reclassification of all six Gopherus species This reclassification would move G. polyphemus from vulnerable to endangered. NatureServe considers the species to be Vulnerable.

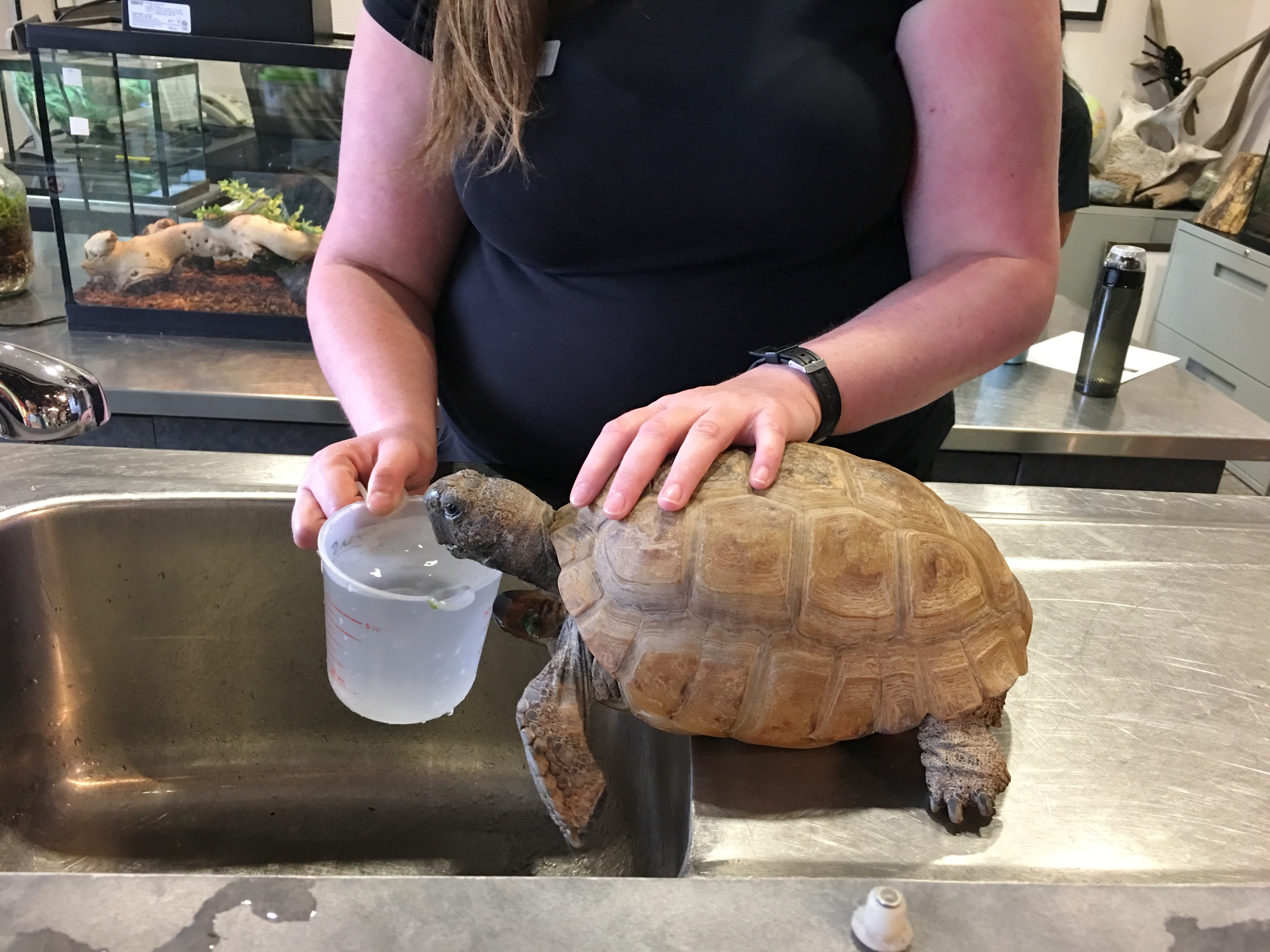
Gus, the oldest known gopher tortoise, lives at the Nova Scotia Museum of Natural History. (August 2019)

The Conservation Clinic at the University of Florida's Levin College of Law describes five main threats to the tortoise population - habitat loss through human development, habitat loss through poor supervision, human desire to use it as a pet or eat it as meat (see human predation), relocation causing population disruption, and disease caused by relocation.

In Mississippi along State Route 63, chain-link fences were built to prevent gopher tortoise mortality from traffic. These fences, made from heavy-gauge wire for durability, are 3 ft (1 m) high and are buried 1 ft below the surface. The fences have "turnarounds" at either end, which are angled fences that redirect tortoises back into the area from which they come. As of 2003, no roadside gopher tortoise deaths had been reported along Route 63 since the construction of the fences.

On July 27, 2016, the Florida Fish and Wildlife Conservation Commission issued a warning to residents and visitors to the state not to paint the shell of a gopher tortoise, as the paint can hinder their ability to convert vitamins they need by sunlight, cause respiratory problems, allow toxic chemicals into the bloodstream, and other harmful effects. The commission has also stated that it is illegal to do so otherwise.

Head-start and release programs have been shown to be effective methods of combating gopher tortoise population decline. At the Yuchi Wildlife Management Area in Burke County, Georgia, during 2014 and 2015, 145 tortoises were released and tracked. Survival was variable throughout the study, but site fidelity remained high. Since tortoises were staying in the same area after release it could be a viable method of population recovery. Release strategy and predator mitigation are essential to its success.

=== Keystone species ===
Gopher tortoises are known as a keystone species. The Florida Fish and Wildlife Conservation Commission states the gopher tortoise provides temporary or permanent refuge for as many as 350 to 400 species, whether the gopher tortoise is present or not. Gopher tortoise burrows create thermally stable microhabitats that buffer environmental conditions. These species include gopher frogs (Rana capito), several species of snakes, such as the eastern indigo snake (Drymarchon couperi), small invertebrates, Bachman's sparrow (Peucaea aestivalis being the most common bird seen around aprons_, and burrowing owls (Athene cunicularia). Several species associated with gopher tortoise burrows are listed as endangered, threatened, or species of special concern by the FWS. Therefore, conservation efforts focused on the gopher tortoise aid these species, as well. The largest threats to gopher tortoises are habitat destruction, habitat degradation, and human predation.

Caterpillars of the moth Ceratophaga vicinella feed on the shells of dead gopher tortoises.

Additionally, gopher tortoise burrows may benefit plant life by exposing mineral soil favorable for germination.

=== Habitat conversion ===
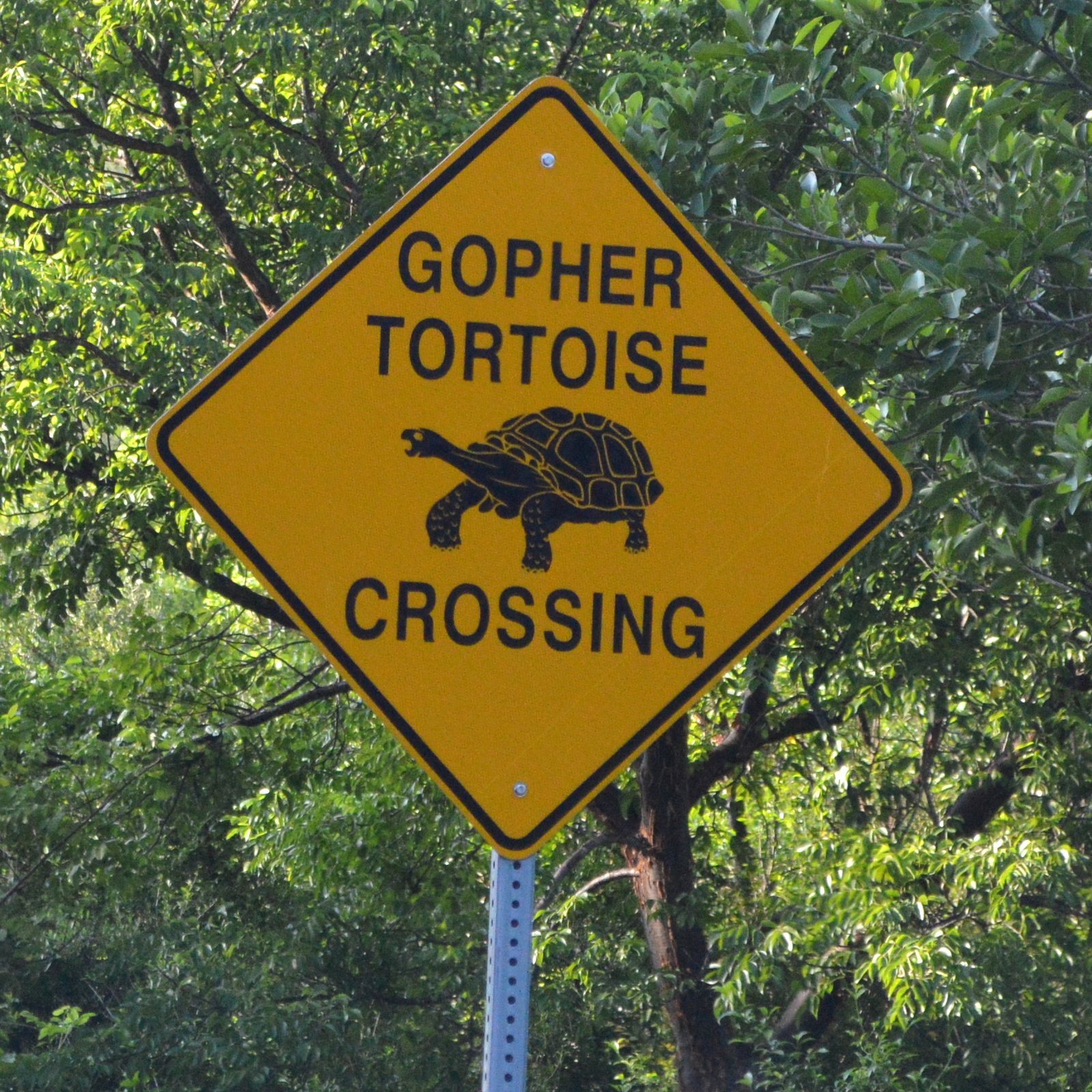
Road sign in Sanibel Island, Florida

Conversion of gopher tortoise habitat to urban areas, croplands, and pasture, along with adverse forest management practices, has drastically reduced their historic range. They often cross roads, which leads to many fatalities by vehicles. The taking of gopher tortoises for sale or use as food or pets has also had a serious effect on some populations, magnified by the length of time required for tortoises to reach maturity and their low reproductive rate. According to the website of the Brevard Zoo in Melbourne, Florida, current estimates of human predation and road mortality alone are at levels that could offset any annual addition to the population, and sightings of gopher tortoises have become rare in many areas, with the ones sighted being much smaller than in the past. A number of other species also prey upon gopher tortoises; predators of eggs and young include raccoons, coyotes, bobcats, wild boars, striped skunks, eastern spotted skunks, red-tailed hawks, red-shouldered hawks, bald eagles, and a number of snake species, including eastern diamondback rattlesnakes, eastern indigo snakes, coachwhips, eastern racers, common kingsnakes, and Florida cottonmouths. Red imported fire ants destroy many eggs and young tortoises. Adult gopher tortoises are less vulnerable to predation, but they are sometimes killed by coyotes, bobcats, and domestic dogs and cats. Nine-banded armadillos may indirectly cause mortality by trapping them in caved-in burrows as they dig their own dens. A 1980 report indicated clutch and hatchling losses often approach 90 percent.

In the past, about 83,955 gopher tortoises were incidentally taken (destroyed) and 137,759 acres of gopher tortoise habitat were permitted for development in Florida, as developers could acquire Florida Fish and Wildlife Conservation Commission (FFWC) incidental take permits to build in the gopher tortoises' natural habitat. Additional gopher tortoise habitat was lost due to issuance of both special and standard tortoise relocation permits, but the total acreage of habitat lost and total number of gopher tortoises relocated cannot be estimated due to issuance of these two types of permits. Both the tortoise and their burrows are now protected under state laws. On July 31, 2007, the FFWC implemented new permitting rules requiring developers to relocate tortoises. Starting on April 22, 2009, three types of permits were available in Florida for developers wishing to build on gopher tortoise habitat. Two of these permits allow for the relocation of gopher tortoises, either to some other place on the site being used for construction, or to a recipient site that has been certified by the FFWC. The third type of permit allows for temporary relocation of tortoises while major utility lines are installed. In the third case, the tortoises are returned to their habitat after construction is complete.

In Florida, gopher tortoises may be eaten by some growth stage of invasive snakes such as Burmese pythons, reticulated pythons, southern African rock pythons, central African rock pythons, boa constrictors, yellow anacondas, Bolivian anacondas, dark-spotted anacondas, and green anacondas.

=== Natural disaster threats ===
Gopher tortoises are sensitive to the stability or quality of the environment where they live. Many anthropogenic disturbances to gopher tortoise habitat have occurred, such as fire regimens to maintain healthy ecosystems, disrupting potential vegetation that is essential to their diet. Though most research has been conducted on upland habitats for gopher tortoises, they also inhabit sand dune ecosystems. Far less is known about these tortoises' role and niche within these coastal environments. This also means that they are threatened by human activity, causing these tortoises to be subject to sea level rise and irregular and intense hurricane patterns. An increase in storm intensity can lead to the ultimate destruction of these coastal habitats and the species that occupy them, or at the very least displacement into other unsuitable habitats. Many of these habitats are located on Florida beaches, which have decreased due to development and have left less than 86,000 acres of wild lands. As a result of these storms, tortoises have been moving up in elevation and residing in abandoned burrows that are deeper be protected from the hurricanes. Researchers have growing concerns over coastal gopher tortoises continuing to lose their habitat as populations are required to move to higher elevations, leading to higher burrow density and burrow sharing. Inhabitation of higher elevation habitats may result in more human contact, which may reduce coastal populations over time. Since many beaches in Florida run parallel to trafficked roads and are therefore fragmented ecosystems, this may directly decrease the survival of these coastal gopher tortoises before there is adequate research done to understand the ecological importance that the coastal gopher tortoises contribute.

=== Human predation ===
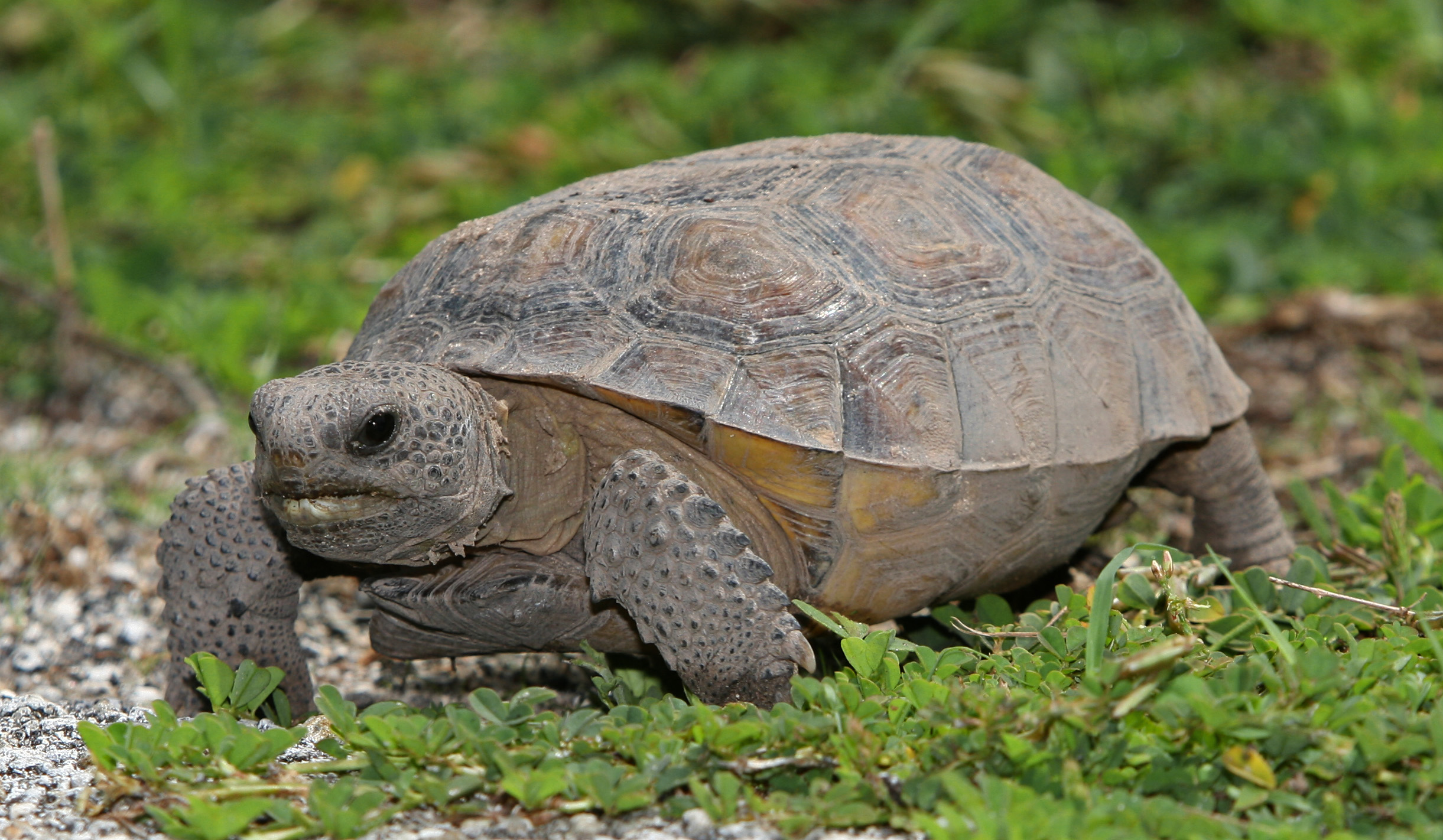
Now protected in most locales, the gopher tortoise was once eaten widely in the Southern United States.

Tortoises are subjected to predation by other animals, including humans. People have eaten gopher tortoises for thousands of years. During the Great Depression, the gopher tortoise was known as the "Hoover chicken" because they were eaten by poor people out of work. Some people see gopher tortoise meat as a delicacy or as simply a free source of meat. Although hunting gopher tortoises or possess their meat or shells is now illegal, hunting was still taking place as of 2008 at an unsustainable rate, with some colonies being driven to extirpation. In 2006, police uncovered "five pounds of tortoise meat in [a] man's refrigerator" after they spotted empty tortoise shells along a highway in Florida. In 19 counties in Alabama, as of 2007 tortoise was listed as "game species", though one with "no open season".

Gopher tortoises have been kept as pets, preventing them from reproducing in their local populations. Captured gopher tortoises had been raced in tortoise races, but this practice was banned in Florida in 1989. Moving a tortoise can lead to harmful consequences to the environment from which it came, because the tortoise is often not returned to where it was found. Also, as tortoise racing involves several tortoises in close proximity to one another, diseases can easily spread. If an infected captive tortoise is then returned to the environment, other tortoises may be infected.

=== Climate change ===
Climate change poses another challenge for the gopher tortoise through alteration of habitat, but they are adapting by way of natural selection. According to the FFWC, rising temperatures and changes in rainfall patterns may increase the numbers of invasive species, which, if are more adapted to these environmental changes, could drive out native plants essential for tortoise's diet. Invasive species can cause habitat fragmentation and increase stress to gopher tortoises and other native animals. Warmer temperatures cause sea level to rise and more extreme weather to occur. Extreme periods of rainfall and drought can cause fewer areas to become available. Also, increases or decreases in water availability can occur. A 1-meter rise in sea level leads to loss of 20% of existing conservation lands and 30% of the natural habitats. Based on current sea level rise, though, a 1-meter rise in ocean levels would occur only after several centuries. Rising sea level moves storms affects both coastal and marine environments. Species may move inland as less land is accessible. This can increase the spread of diseases or disrupt food cycles and reproduction.

=== Habitat loss ===
In 1987, human urbanization and various human activities in Mississippi, Louisiana, and Alabama caused dramatic declines in the tortoise population, and the FWS listed them as "endangered". Though the population declined in Florida, Georgia, and South Carolina, they were not yet listed as threatened at the time. However, in recent years, habitat loss is increasing as southern states continue to experience human population growth and expand on highway road construction. The southeast has had a 20% increase in human population between 1990 and 2000.

One of the most suitable habitats for gopher tortoises is the longleaf pine ecosystem, which provides suitable, well-drained and sandy soils for tortoises to inhabit. Longleaf pine forests include abundant low herbaceous plant growth and open canopy/space for tortoise's eggs to incubate. Since European settlement, longleaf pine decreased in area by an estimated 96%, which has contributed to an 80% decrease in population densities of gopher tortoises. Over 80% of gopher tortoise habita is now privately owned. Although federal, state, and privately managed forest lands can harbor a significant number of tortoises, pine plantations with high tree densities can become unsuitable due to the area having an increase in shaded areas, leading to a decrease in ground-cover species. These habitats are also pyrogenic which means that fragmentation has direct effects on the natural fire regime and therefore reduced habitat quality.

Over its range in the southeast, four large core areas still provide the opportunity to protect large areas of tortoise habitat, as well the biological diversity of the coastal plain. They are (from west to east) De Soto National Forest, Eglin Air Force Base, Apalachicola National Forest, and Okefenokee Swamp in Florida. These areas offer an opportunity to restore forest stands and land areas containing populations of native vertebrate animals threatened by habitat fragmentation. Restoring the natural causal factors of fire, especially, and flooding would also assist in restoring the plant and animal communities.

If Florida's population doubles, 7,000,000 acres (11,000 sq mi; 28,000 km^{2}) of land, which is the size of Vermont, could be developed. 3,000,000 acres (4,700 sq mi; 12,000 km^{2}) of agricultural lands and 2,700,000 acres (4,200 sq mi; 11,000 km^{2}) of unused land will be developed. This will cause more competition for water resources between animals and humans. The low reproductive rate of the tortoise makes it more vulnerable to declines in longleaf ecosystem and extinction.

=== Habitat fragmentation ===
Anthropogenic activity appears to not only result in habitat loss, but also habitat fragmentation. Turtles and tortoises are strongly impacted by railways, which can act as barriers to movement. Radio telemetry data show that gopher tortoises cross railways significantly less frequently than expected. Tortoises also have poor ability to escape from railways after entering the area between the rails. Railway-habituated tortoises (those believed to live near railways and interact with them) and naïve tortoises (those unlikely to frequently interact with railways) do not differ substantially in their railway escape behavior, suggesting that prior experience may not improve tortoises' ability to escape from railways that they have entered. Trenches dug beneath railways can facilitate movement across and escape from railways. As railways are prevalent throughout the gopher tortoise's geographic range, implementation of railway trenches may improve population connectivity and reduce habitat fragmentation.

=== Diseases ===
Gopher tortoises are known to contract upper respiratory tract diseases (URTDs) caused by various microorganisms, including the bacterium Mycoplasma agassizii and iridovirus and herpes viruses. Symptoms of URTDs include serous, mucoid, or purulent discharge from the nares, excessive tearing to purulent ocular discharge, conjunctivitis, and edema of the eyelids and ocular glands. M. agassizii is known to exist in tortoises without showing obvious symptoms. Little is known about why some tortoises test positive and live for years, while others become seriously ill and die. The antibiotic enrofloxacin has been used to treat bacterial URTDs in G. polyphemus. However, there is no cure for URTD.

Although long-term studies indicate URTDs can cause population declines in desert tortoise populations 10–15 years after initial infection, studies of such length have not been performed on G. polyphemus. One study, which observed G. polyphemus tortoises in Florida from 2003 to 2006, returned the unexpected observation that tortoises that were seropositive for URTD antibodies were less likely to die over that time than seronegative tortoises. However, the habitats of more seropositive populations had more remains of dead tortoises. The investigators offered the explanation that seropositive tortoises had survived an initial infection, then developed chronic disease. This evidence may imply a possible acute effect on mortality, followed by chronic disease in surviving individuals. Further studies are needed to more fully understand the effects of URTD on this species.

A study found that 14 of 35 Florida gopher tortoises tested positive for a bacterium provisionally called "candidatus Anaplasma testudinis". These tortoises came into the animal hospitals with anemia and cytoplasmic vacuolization. This bacterial species can cause anaplasmosis, thought to damage red blood cells. It can spread by ticks or other biological vectors and is transmittable, but not contagious. Since this disease was so prevalent within the tortoises studied, this disease is believed to occur frequently and is common in wild populations. This then becomes a pressing issue in terms of the conservation efforts put forward to decrease the likelihood of this disease affecting the population. Ticks are the predicted biological vectors, but identification of other potential carriers and which tick species are more likely to spread diseases to gopher tortoises are needed.

== Longleaf forest conservation ==
Since the preservation of the longleaf pine ecosystem in particular is required for the maintenance of the gopher tortoise, conservation efforts are needed to maintain this endangered ecosystem. The longleaf pine ecosystem provides extreme conditions such as "nutrient" deprived soil and "sandy sites" for the gopher turtle's habitat. The longleaf pine is a relatively long-lived tree for this region of the world, with individual trees often persisting for several centuries. Conserving these forests would provide the natural habitat gopher tortoises need. The geographic range of the gopher tortoise once encompassed much of the longleaf pine forests of the southeastern United States.

Successful reforestation efforts have been made. According to the Environmental Defense Fund's website, environmentalists and private landowners are working together to maintain wildlife habitat, while maintaining crop productivity. Groups provide assistance to private landowners to ensure funding for conservation incentives to landowners who are willing to preserve wildlife on their soil. Most lands in the East are privately owned. Landowners use "prescribed burns" to restore favorable habitat conditions. Prescribed burns managed by the Safe Harbor Agreement benefits U.S. Fish & Wildlife, serve under Federal Endangered Species Act help reduces and prevents the amount of invasive species that are threatening to the tortoise. Invasive species, such as the cogongrass (Imperata cylindrica) and fire ants that disrupt gopher tortoise's habitat and kill tortoise eggs, can be controlled. Prescribed fire is one method to provide sufficient ground for the tortoise and its eggs to survive and maintain biodiversity. In terms of the biodiversity within longleaf pine ecosystems, the gopher tortoise and the burrows it creates help protect various types of fauna, reinforcing its ecological importance.

== Sources ==
- Guyer, Craig; Johnson, Valerie M.; Hermann, Sharon M. (2012). "Effects of Population Density on Patterns of Movement and Behavior of Gopher Tortoises (Gopherus Polyphemus)". Herpetological Monographs. 26 (1): 122–134. doi:10.1655/HERPMONOGRAPHS-D-10-00004.1. S2CID 86079337.
- Shearer, Benjamin F.; Shearer, Barbara S. (1994). State names, seals, flags, and symbols (2nd ed.). Westport, Connecticut: Greenwood Publishing Group. ISBN 978-0-313-28862-3.
