= University of King's College =

Canadian university in Halifax, Nova Scotia

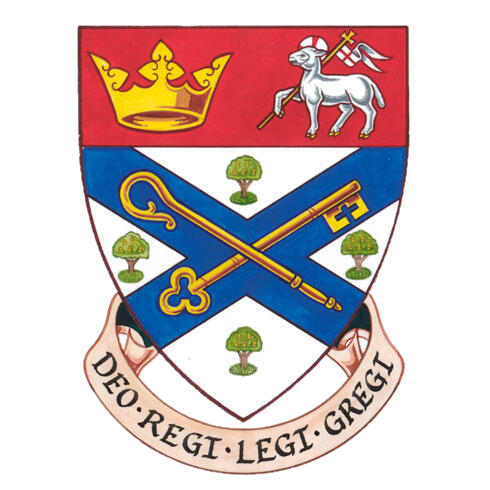
- Motto: Deo Legi Regi Gregi (Latin)
- Motto in English: For God, Law, King, People
- Type: Public university
- Established: 1789; 237 years ago
- Affiliations: Dalhousie University, AUCC, CUP.
- Endowment: $51.4 million
- Chancellor: Debra Deane Little
- President: Dr. Timothy Vine
- Vice-president: Sarah Clift
- Visitor: Sandra Fyfe ex officio as the Anglican Bishop of Nova Scotia and Prince Edward Island
- Faculty: 64
- Students: 983 (Fall 2026)
- Undergraduates: 862
- Postgraduates: 121
- Location: Halifax, Nova Scotia; 44°38′15″N 63°35′43″W
- Campus: Urban, 5-acre (2.02 ha)
- Colours: Blue and White
- Website: www.ukings.ca

The University of King's College is a public liberal arts university in Halifax, Nova Scotia. Established in 1789, it is the oldest chartered university in Canada, and the oldest English-language university in the Commonwealth outside the United Kingdom. The university is regarded for its Foundation Year Program (FYP), a comprehensive first-year curriculum designed to study a variety of intellectual developments—past and present—through great books and ideas. It is also known for its upper-year interdisciplinary programs, particularly in contemporary studies, early modern studies, and the history of science and technology. In addition, the university has a journalism school that attracts students from across the world for its intensive graduate programs in journalism, writing, and publishing.

The university was founded by royal charter in Windsor, Nova Scotia as the King's Collegiate School in 1788, but the school moved to its current location in Halifax after a fire destroyed a large portion of the original university in 1920. The relocation was made possible with the help of Dalhousie University, which has since maintained a joint Faculty of Arts and Sciences with King's, which provides students with access to Dalhousie's facilities and services. Furthermore, students from King's and Dalhousie can enrol in courses offered at either institution as the campuses are located adjacent to each other. Despite this academic partnership, the University of King's College remains independent under its own charter.

== History ==
=== Late 18th century and 19th century ===
During the British evacuation of New York in 1783, Charles Inglis, the rector of Trinity Church, led the flight of Loyalists, later called United Empire Loyalists (UEL), to Windsor, Nova Scotia. In 1788, the resettled Loyalists founded the King's Collegiate School in Windsor, named after King George III. In the following year, the University of King's College emerged from the collegiate while an act was passed for "the permanent establishment and effectual support of a college at Windsor," and £400 per annum was granted towards its maintenance. The college opened in 1790, and received a royal charter from George III in 1802, becoming Canada's first English-speaking, degree-granting university. Even though the University of New Brunswick traces its history to another King's College at Fredericton established in 1785, it did not initially receive degree-granting powers through a Royal Charter until 1827. Similarly, McGill University traces its origins to 1801 but did not receive a Royal Charter until 1821.

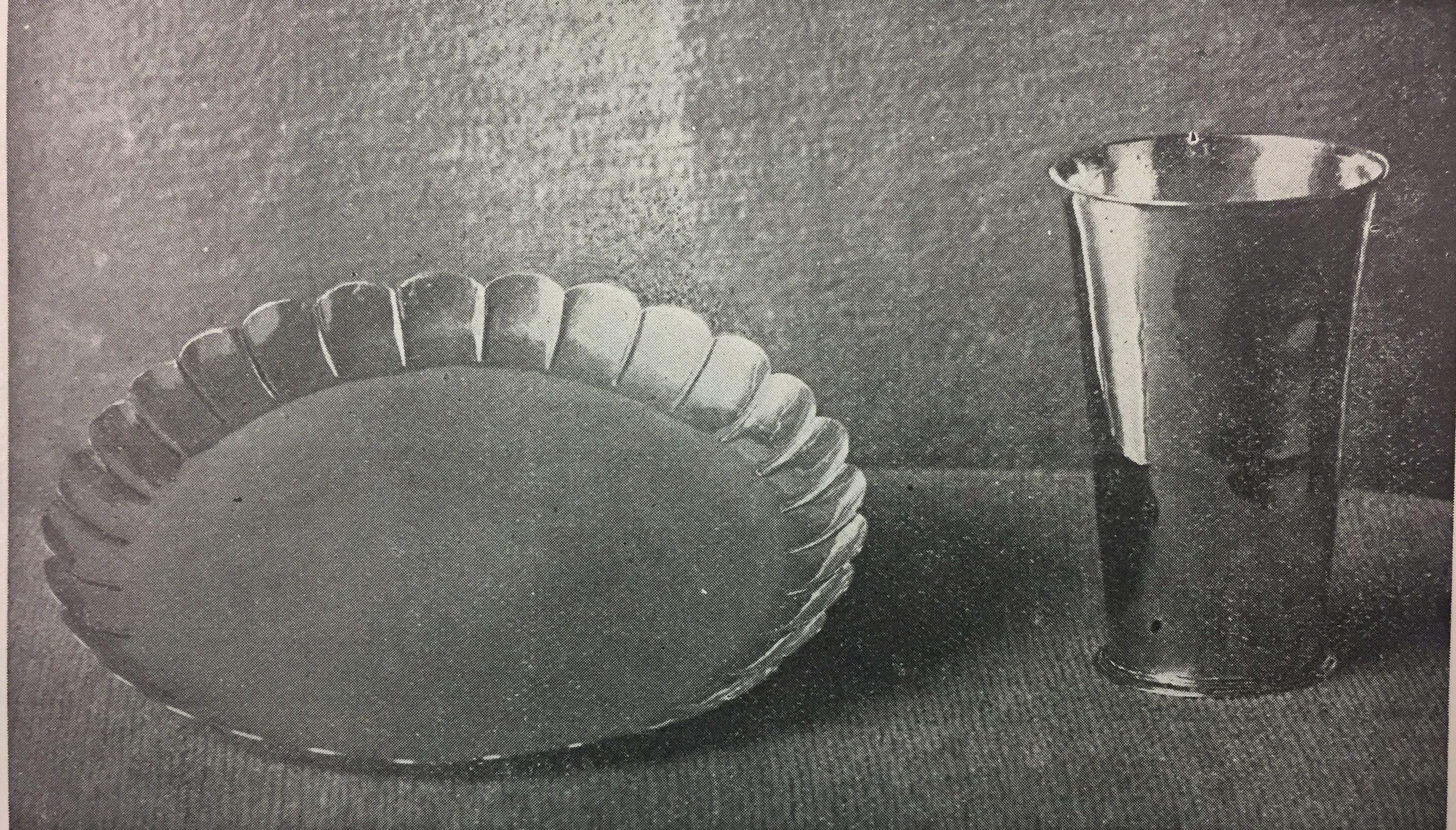
In 1891, King's chapel acquires the oldest (c. 1663) Anglican chalice in Canada

Windsor was chosen as the location of the college, as it was described at the time as "a cherished semi-rural retreat for generations of Nova Scotians." A significant reason for the establishment of King's College was to discourage young, male Nova Scotians from studying in the United States, where they might be exposed to republican ideals.

The founding of a College or Seminary of learning on a liberal plan in that province [Nova Scotia] where youth may receive a virtuous education and can be qualified for the learned professions, is, we humbly conceive, a member of great consequence, as it would diffuse religious literature, loyalty, and good morals among His Majesty's subjects there. If such a seminary is not established the inhabitants will have no means of educating their sons at home, but will be under the but will necessity of sending them for that purpose either to Great Britain... or else some of the states of this continent, where they will soon imbibe principles that are unfavourable to the British Constitution.

On this, Inglis, the Archbishop of Nova Scotia and a founder of the college, was clear:

...one of the principle motives for pushing [the college] forward was to prevent the importation of American Divines and American politics into the province. Unless we have a seminary here, the youth of Nova Scotia will be sent for their education to the Revolted Colonies—the inevitable consequences would be a corruption of their religious and political principle.

Another significant reason for the founding of the college was to prevent the spread of regional varieties of English in Nova Scotia:

A very principal object of the new institution would be accomplished by assimilating the manner of the rising generation to those of the parent state . . . to teach the genuine use, practice and pronunciation of the English language, which in distant colonies is apt to degenerate, and that the purity of the language, undebased by local or national accents and solecisms, is undeniably to be found in the Kingdom of England.

These ideas continued during the development and appointments of the college's board, principals, and faculty. Influence in the development of the college came from the highest levels, including the first Bishop of Nova Scotia and Archbishop of Canterbury. The first Board of Governors include the colony's governor, lieutenant governor, chief justice, the secretary of the colony, the speaker of the House of Assembly, the attorney general, and the solicitor general.

The university was residential, tutorial, and closely tied to the Anglican Church. Only white, Anglican men could attend the college, and during the 19th century these students were required to adhere to the Thirty-nine Articles of the Anglican Church. As a result, several groups were barred from attending, including the Mi'kmaq, Francophones, Catholics, non-Anglican Protestants, and slaves, including those slaves owned by the founders of the town of Windsor.

==== Other facts ====
Upon discovering the chalice and paten of St. Peter's Anglican Church (West LaHave, Nova Scotia) were being sold in Halifax, Senator William Johnston Almon purchased them and donated them to the King's College Chapel (1891). The chalice is reported to be the oldest Anglican chalice in Canada, dated to c. 1663.

The Town of Windsor assert that students at King's College invented ice hockey c. 1800 on Long Pond adjacent to the campus. A similar game developed, perhaps independently, in Kingston, Ontario, several years later which has led to occasional confusion about the sport's origins.

=== Early and mid-20th century ===
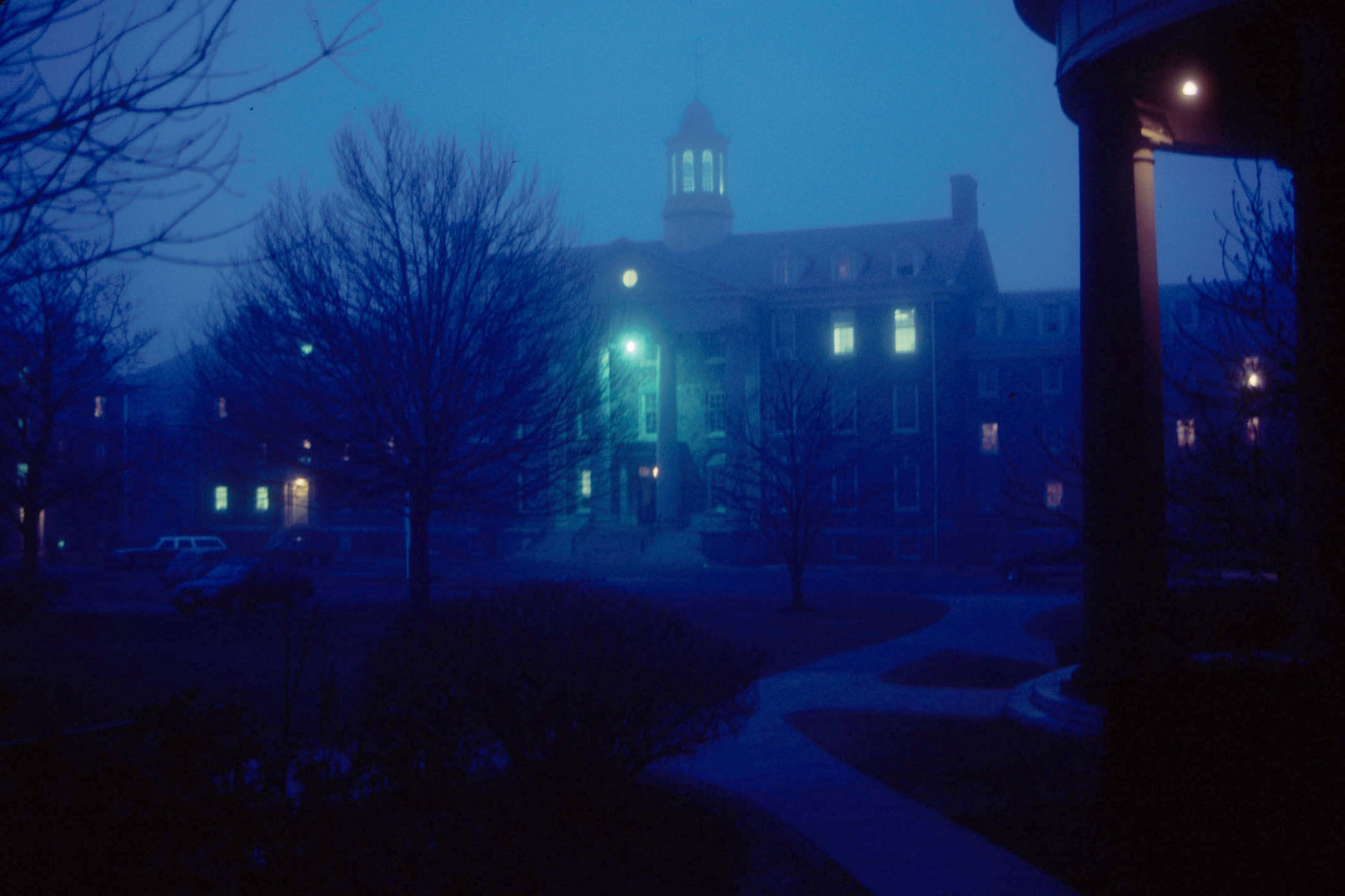
A view of the Arts & Administration Building, North Pole Bay, and Cochran Bay from across the Quad in a spring fog

On February 5, 1920, a fire consumed many of the university's buildings. Although the cause of the blaze is still unknown, legend states it was caused by students playing with matches in a dormitory. Due to frozen fire hydrants at the time of the event, the blaze could not be put out and a majority of the 28-hectare campus burned to the ground.

In 1922, the Carnegie Foundation offered a conditional grant to rebuild King's College. Among the provisions were that King's College was to be rebuilt in Halifax, the capital of Nova Scotia, and that it was to enter into an association with Dalhousie University. The partnership required King's to pay the salaries of select Dalhousie professors, who, in return, would help manage King's College. In addition, students at King's would be permitted to study at Dalhousie, while Dalhousie students would be permitted to study at King's with the exception of divinity; the granting of all other degrees outlined in the 1802 charter was to be temporarily halted. The conditions were in hope that one day all of Nova Scotia's universities would merge into a single body, much like the University of Toronto. As consolidation was a way to strengthen a small and financially insecure institution, King's College accepted the funding and relocated to the northwest corner of Dalhousie's Studley Campus, at the intersection of Oxford Street and Coburg Road. Alongside the move, the institution renamed itself “University of King's College”. Other universities in Halifax similarly did not follow through with the Carnegie Foundation's merger plan.

In the formative years of King's College, many more types of degrees were offered than the institution offers today; for example, the University of New Brunswick Faculty of Law traces its history to the "King's College Law School" that was established in 1892 by King's College (in Windsor). While the University of King's College has never lost nor relinquished interest in these granting powers, they are held in abeyance due to agreements with the University of King's College's partner, Dalhousie University, as part of the agreement to allow the portion of Dalhousie's campus to be used by the University of King's College. In addition, professional education in the 19th century expanded beyond the traditional fields of theology, law, and medicine — thus, graduate training based on the German model of specialized course work and the completion of a research thesis was introduced at the school.

In 1923, the former site of King's College in Windsor was designated a National Historic Site.

When World War II broke out, King's was requisitioned by the military for the training of naval officers between 1941 and 1945. King's functioned as a "stone frigate", providing a facility for navigation training before officers were sent to their ships. This role is highlighted in the 1943 Hollywood feature film, Corvette K-225, a part of which was filmed on the university campus. The academic life of the college carried on during those years elsewhere in Halifax, aided by Dalhousie University and the United Church's Pine Hill Divinity Hall. In reflection of this naval past, the student bar on campus is known as the HMCS King's Wardroom, often referred to as "The Wardroom" or "The Wardy".

During the war, the Germans would occasionally broadcast names of Allied ships they had sunk. As ships had to keep radio silence, these reports could not be verified, and it was suspected that many were false. Allies circulated lists of non-active ships in the hopes of feeding the Germans misinformation; when the Germans broadcast that they had sunk HMCS King's, their ruse was exposed.

After the war, the campus was returned to the university. The policy of university education initiated in the 1960s responded to population pressure and the belief that higher education was a key to social justice and economic productivity for individuals and for society.

=== Late 20th century and 21st century ===
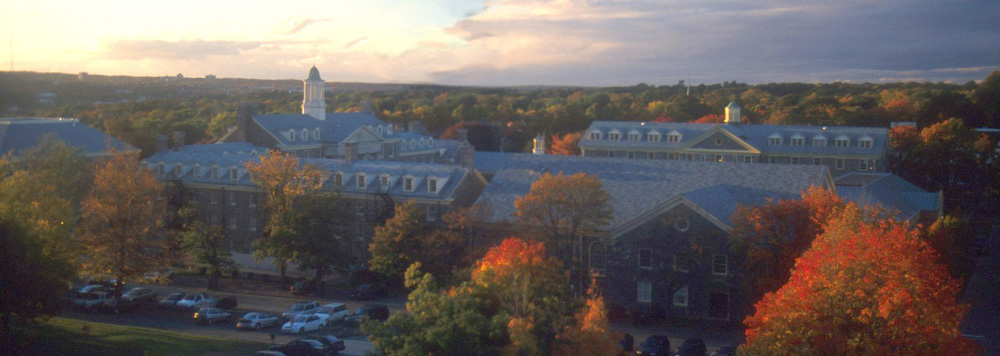
University of King's College in Autumn with Castine Way along the foreground

Until the spring of 1971, the university granted graduate theological degrees as well as undergraduate degrees. In the same year, the Faculty of Divinity was moved to Pine Hill, where it was formally amalgamated into the Atlantic School of Theology, an ecumenical venture with the United Church of Canada and the Roman Catholic Church. While this new institution now grants its own degrees, King's holds in abeyance its rights to grant divinity credentials and still continues to grant annual honorary degrees.

In 1972, King's faculty and alumni created the Foundation Year Program (FYP), a first-year great books course that would count for four of a student's five first-year credits. The program consisted of six sections from The Ancient World to The Contemporary World, in which students would read the work of major philosophers, poets, historians and scientists, receive lectures from a range of experts in all these areas, write critical papers and engage in small-group discussion and tutorials. The program initially had 30 students; it now draws almost 300 a year, most of whom live in residence on campus. Many of those who taught in the program in its early days were colleagues and students of the philosopher James Doull, who exercised a considerable degree of influence on the program in its formative stages. In 1989, Doull was awarded an honorary doctorate by the university.

In 1977, King's introduced two Bachelor of Journalism programs: a four-year honours degree and a one-year compressed degree for students who already hold a bachelor's degree.

In 1989, a campus library building was erected to commemorate the bicentennial of the university. It replaced a smaller library in the Arts and Administration building. The library has won numerous architectural awards. In 2000, the same architect designed the school's New Academic Building. In 2001, additional residence rooms were added in the basement of Alexandra Hall to accommodate some of the new students. Residence can currently accommodate 274 students, and nearly all on-campus living spaces are reserved for FYP students, though some spaces are reserved for upper-year students. All buildings on the present campus are celebrated reconstructions and derivations of the buildings of the original 1789 campus in Windsor, Nova Scotia. A system of tunnels connects the residences to the other buildings of the campus, a feature particularly common to North American universities.

The King's Library houses a collection not only of rare Anglican church documents and a collection of original artwork, Renaissance and medieval books, and extensive archival material of relevance both to the history of Nova Scotia and the university. It also has ancient artifacts, along with the Weldon Collection of fine imported china. Many of the rare books stem from the original, private collection of university founder, Charles Inglis. Recently, the blueprints for the buildings of the current campus were consulted in the library to restore the famed cupola crowning the Arts & Administration Building to its original 1920's condition.

In 1993, King's created the Contemporary Studies program. In 1999, King's launched the Early Modern Studies program. In 2000, King's commenced the History of Science and Technology program. Each of these programs can constitute one component of a jointly conferred combined honours degree with Dalhousie. The Upper Year Program, like the FYP, place an emphasis on historical contextualized, interdisciplinary study as opposed to traditional university departmentalization.

In 2001, the FYP class was 274 students, with slightly over a hundred of these students coming from Ontario. The growing number of students from out of province reflects King's growing academic reputation and its transformation from a small, local college to a nationally acclaimed university. However, King's maintains ties to its host city and province and the number of Nova Scotians attending King's rose 23 per cent between 1994 and 2004.

The largest FYP class was in 2004 with 309 students. However, the administration has resolved to cap future classes at just under 300. The number of students leaving after first year has dropped significantly since the introduction of the upper year inter-disciplinary programs.

In terms of teaching quality, King's has been placed in the same academic league as top Canadian research universities like McGill and Toronto. An academic commentator summed up King's growing renown for its quality of teaching and eccentric student culture by remarking "If there is a Harvard of the North, it’s more likely King’s than McGill — although a better analogy would be a cross between Harry Potter’s Hogwarts and Camp Wanapitei in Temagami." The new programs, combined with a rigorous set of academic expectations and a cooperative academic culture, have proven a hit with high achieving high school students. Conservative estimates put the entrance average of first year King's students at 87%, or a strong A in Canadian high school marks.

In October 2003, Dr. William Barker was installed as president and vice-chancellor, replacing Dr. Colin Starnes. Dr. Barker and the rest of the university administration have declared that King's has grown as much as it can and should. They describe the coming years as "a time of consolidation", with a focus on retention and development of new programs.

The university's growth has changed some King's traditions. Formal meals, with Latin grace and academic gowns, formerly held at regular intervals, were suspended from 2001 until 2003. Only with the arrival of Dr. Barker were they reinstated. They now take place on the first Wednesday of every month.

In July 2006, the King's Student Union founded the King's Co-op Bookstore. The bookstore is a student-owned co-operative which functions separately from both the student union and the university.

King's College administration has not avoided controversy. After the Sodexo cleaning staff unionized in 2004, the housekeeping contract was awarded to a different company during the summer. The King's Student Union had been involved in encouraging the workers to unionize in order to improve their working conditions, and there were strenuous objections to the awarding of the new contract.

The University of King's College's arms were registered with the Canadian Heraldic Authority on August 15, 2007.

== Academics ==
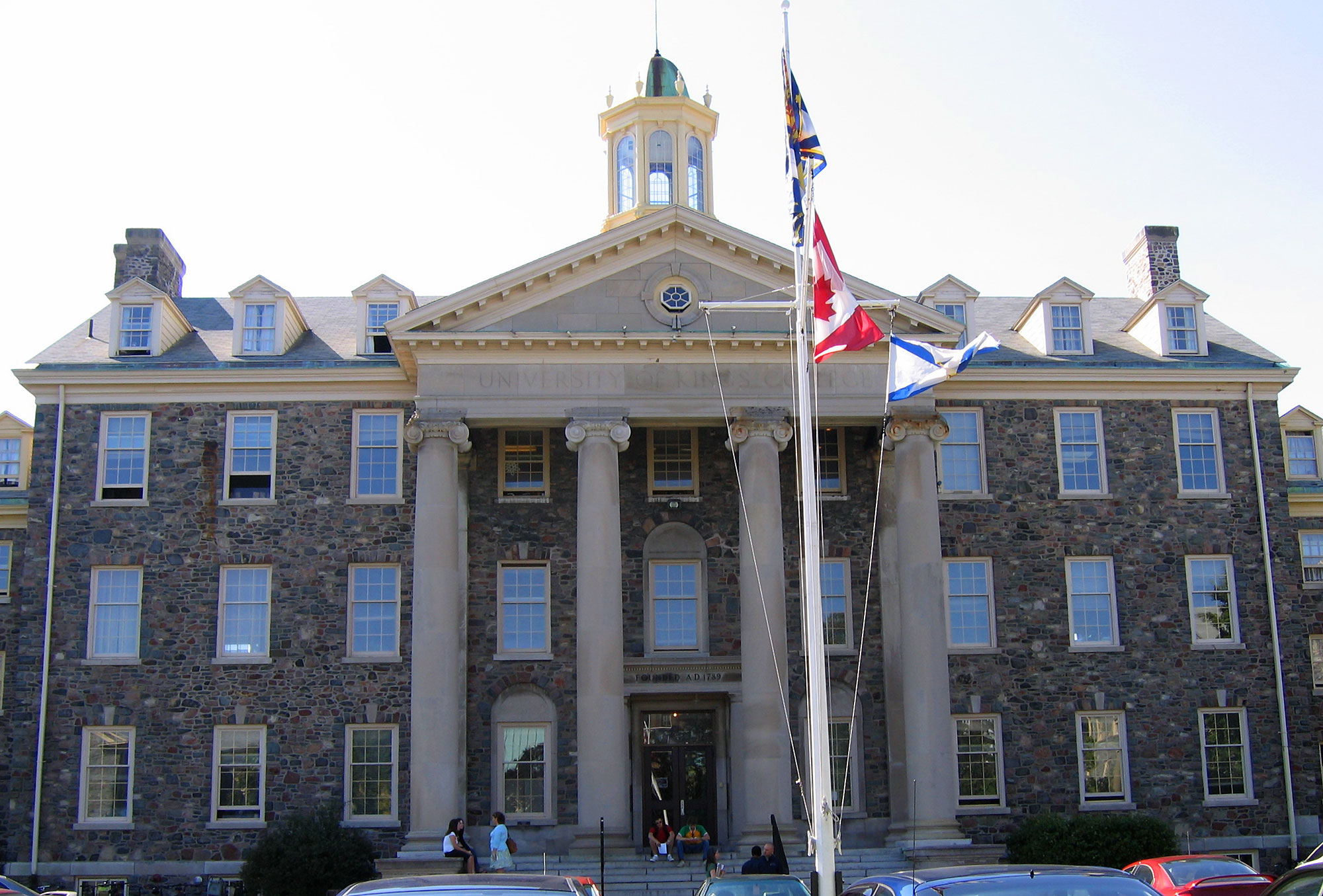
The Arts & Administration Building

Since 1972, King's has been offering its Foundation Year Program (FYP) for undergraduate students, an intensive survey course of history, philosophy, and literature in the Western tradition. The core texts program has "a national reputation for excellence as an alternative first-year of undergraduate studies", and is regarded as a prototype for similar liberal arts programs elsewhere. The Canadian news magazine Maclean's likewise reflected this view in a discussion of small, specialized undergraduate programs in Canada, expressing "it's unlikely that any of the other programs would exist if not for the Foundation Year at King's". In 2008 and 2009, the FYP program was ranked first in Canada by the National Survey of Student Engagement.

King's students take the FYP in their first year, then choose a specific degree program to pursue in their final three years. Furthermore, the college offers First-Year Interest Groups (FIGs), which are small study groups meant to supplement student learning in the FYP as well as the individual's academic interests; these are open to students from any program and generally consist of tutorials, study sessions, and social events. Because of King's affiliation with Dalhousie, it is common for students at King's to take some classes for their major and/or minor through Dalhousie University. With the exception of the journalism program, King's students graduate with joint degrees from both institutions. King's students are also eligible to complete these degrees in any subject from Dalhousie's Faculty of Arts and Social Sciences or Faculty of Science.

The specialized Contemporary Studies Program (CSP), the Early Modern Studies Program (EMSP), and the History of Science and Technology Program (HOST) are offered jointly with Dalhousie University as combined honours degrees requiring a second honours discipline. If the students decide to do a King's subject as their primary honours subject, they are required to write an honours thesis, varying in length from program to program. A Bachelor of Journalism program is offered as either a four-year honours degree or an intensive one-year program to students already holding a bachelor's degree. King's College and Dalhousie University also jointly offer a 10-month Master of Journalism program and a two-year limited residency Master of Fine Arts degree in Creative Nonfiction program.

== Student life ==
=== Traditions ===
Once every two months, formal meals are held. Students wearing traditional academic gowns are led into the meal hall by a bagpiper. Once they have found their seat, a Latin grace is said. Afterwards, the catered meal begins. These meals were formerly held at regular intervals, but were suspended from 2001 until 2003. They were reinstated during the presidency of William Barker at his behest.

The UKing's Literary Society (formerly the Haliburton Society), a student-run literary society, has hosted discussions concerning poetry and prose since 1884. The society remains the longest-standing university literary society throughout the Commonwealth of Nations and North America. The society took its original name from the Canadian politician Thomas Chandler Haliburton. It adopted its current name in 2020, as a result of a long-standing controversy over Haliburton's pro-slavery views.

=== Residence ===
The residences are built in the Georgian style typical of the original campus. Each "bay", as the original residences were termed in Windsor, is modelled on the system of 'staircases' at England's Oxford University. Each has also been named with a seemingly ironic moniker: North Pole Bay sits atop the university's boiler rooms, and is arguably the warmest location on campus; Chapel Bay is named after the campus chapel, but is located the furthest distance from it; Radical Bay originally housed the refined, quiet divinity students; Middle Bay, which was named for its location as it is between Chapel and Radical, is named ironically as being the only non-ironic name; in addition, there is Cochran Bay, named after the first president of the college, William Cochran, and is the closest to the campus chapel.

Often residence-wide parties, known as 'bay parties,' occurred, but were cancelled in 2003. However, there was a brief revival during the 2005–2006 school year, with both Radical Bay and Cochran Bay hosting several highly successful events. In place of this tradition, each Bay now organizes a themed-event on campus during different times of the school year.

Another consequence of increased enrolment has been a more unbalanced composition of the residences. Traditionally, students from all years of study have lived in residence, but increasingly, very few upper year students continue to live on campus, thus making way for more first years. In 2006, Alexandra Hall, traditionally the all-women's residence, was made co-ed for the first time with rooms in the basement alternating between male and female occupants as well as one wing of the first floor becoming all-male. In addition, two of the five bays were re-converted to co-ed living spaces in 2006.

=== Annual events ===
==== Alex Fountain Memorial Lecture ====
Since 2011, an annual memorial lecture is given by an individual chosen each year by the student body. After a nomination process at the beginning of the winter semester, a long list of twenty is narrowed to a short list of ten by student election. The short list is then prioritized by a student committee, which includes the program directors and president. The lecture is free, open to the public, and concludes in a question and answer period. Previous lecturers and lectures include Michaëlle Jean on 'Building Social Change Locally and Globally', Charles Taylor on 'Is Democracy in Danger?', Michael Ondaatje on 'Mongrel art: A discussion of literature and its neighbours', Jan Zwicky on 'What Meaning Is and Why It Matters', and Tanya Tagaq on 'Climate, culture, and collaboration', as well as Canadian author Joseph Boyden.

The event is held in memorial after Alex Fountain, a student who died by suicide on 22 August 2009 at the age of 20. His family donated $1 million to the mental health program at the Queen Elizabeth II Health Sciences Centre, as well as additional contributions to other mental health programs at Dalhousie University, the IWK Health Centre and Capital Health. In addition, they founded the lecture series.

=== Athletics ===
King's is a member of the Atlantic Colleges Athletic Association (ACAA). The Varsity athletics teams at the University of King's College are named the Blue Devils. Sporting teams include men's and women's basketball, soccer, badminton and rugby, and women's volleyball.

=== King's College Chapel ===
The King's College Chapel is a multi-purpose space at the University of King's College in Halifax, Nova Scotia. It serves as a venue for religious services, musical performances, and community events. While it follows the Anglican tradition, the chapel is open to all members of the university community and is used for both spiritual and secular activities.

== People ==
=== Chancellors ===
- Edwin Gilpin (1891–1897)
- Edward Jarvis (1897–1911)
- Sir Charles J. Townshend (1912–1922)
- John Hackenley (1937–1943)
- Ray Lawson (1948–1956)
- Lionel Avard Forsyth (1956–1957)
- H. R. Milner (1957–1963)
- Robert H. Morris (1964–1969)
- Norman H. Gosse (1971–1972)
- Roland Ritchie (1974–1988)
- G. Hamilton Southam (1988–1996)
- Trevor Eyton (1996–2001)
- Michael Meighen (2001–2013)
- Kevin G. Lynch (2013–2018)
- Debra Deane Little (since 2020)

=== Presidents ===
- William Cochran (1789–1804)
- Thomas Cox (1804–1805)
- Charles Porter (1805–1836)
- George McCawley (1836–1875)
- John Dart (1875–1885)
- Isaac Brock (1885–1889)
- Charles E. Willets (1889–1904)
- Ian Hannah (1904–1906)
- C. J. Boulden (1906–1909)
- T. W. Powell (1909–1914)
- Charles E. Willets (Acting President, 1914–1916)
- T. S. Boyle (1916–1924)
- A. H. Moore (1924–1937)
- A. Stanley Walker (1937–1953)
- H. L. Puxley (1954–1963)
- H. D. Smith (1963–1969)
- F. Hilton Page (Acting President, 1969–1970)
- J. Graham Morgan (1970–1977)
- John Godfrey (1977–1987)
- Marion G. Fry (1987–1993)
- Colin Starnes (1993–2003)
- William Barker (2003–2011)
- Anne Leavitt (2011–2012)
- George Cooper (2012–2016)
- William Lahey (2016–present)

=== Notable current and former faculty ===
- Michael Bishop - Author of The Endless Theory of Days and Scholar of French Contemporary. Director of Editions VVV Editions
- George Bain - Director of the School of Journalism, 1979–85
- Robert D. Crouse - Chair of Classics department at Dalhousie, co-founder of Dionysius
- Sir Charles G. D. Roberts - prominent member of the group known as the Confederation Poets
- Henry How - Chemist and mineralogist, described two minerals new to science: howlite and mordenite
- Stephen Kimber - Rogers Communications Chair in Journalism, prominent journalist and columnist for The Daily News
- Neil Robertson - founding director of the early modern Studies program, author of Leo Strauss: An Introduction
- Stephen Snobelen - Director of the History of Science and Technology Program; Featured in BBC documentary Newton: The Dark Heretic
- Walter Stewart - Director of the School of Journalism
- Laura Penny - Author of Your Call Is Important To Us: The Truth About Bullshit and More Money Than Brains: Why School Sucks, College is Crap, and Idiots Think They're Right

== See also ==
- List of Anglo-Catholic churches
- Royal eponyms in Canada
- List of oldest universities in continuous operation
- Higher education in Nova Scotia
- List of universities in Nova Scotia
- Canadian university scientific research organizations
- List of National Historic Sites in Nova Scotia
