= Wayne Hankey =

Canadian philosopher (1944–2022)

- Born: November 7, 1944; Lower Sackville, Nova Scotia
- Died: February 5, 2022 (aged 77)
- Awards: Dalhousie University Medal in Philosophy (1965), University of Dallas Aquinas Medal (2015)

Academic background
- Education: University of King's College

Academic work
- Main interests: Neoplatonism, Islamic and Jewish philosophy in the middle ages, Relations between Hellenistic Judaism, Christianity and Islam, Medieval philosophy, Contemporary French philosophy

Wayne John Hankey (November 7, 1944 – February 5, 2022) was a Canadian religious philosopher. Hankey had a lengthy career in academia, holding the title of professor emeritus in the Classics department at Dalhousie University until charged with historic sexual assault in February 2021. Hankey died on February 5, 2022, before standing trial on sexual abuse charges.

== Early life and education ==
Hankey was raised in Lower Sackville, Nova Scotia. He studied classics, philosophy, and theology at University of King's College, Dalhousie University, Trinity College, the University of Toronto, and Oxford University.

During his time as a student at King's, Hankey was a founder of the university's student union and one of its first presidents.

== Career ==
Hankey spent several years conducting research in Rome and Paris and held research positions at the universities of Oxford, Cambridge, Harvard, and Boston College. In 1981 he completed his doctoral studies in theology at the University of Oxford, St. Peter's College, with his thesis "The Structure of the first forty-five Questions of St. Thomas Aquinas' Summa Theologiae" and was later ordained a priest in the Anglican Church of Canada. For many years, until being suspended from public ministry and then becoming a Roman Catholic, Hankey was a staunch opponent against reforms in the Anglican Church.

In 1965 he was first hired by Dalhousie University to teach second-year Greek, and he would continue to teach university classes for more than 45 years, including four years at York University. He initiated the foundation year program at the University of King's College and was the program's first director from 1972 to 1978. He also designed and spearheaded the development and subsequent construction of the university's new library during his time as librarian of the college (1981–1993). He was responsible for the creation of the religious studies program at Dalhousie University and for seven years until 2015 chaired the Department of Classics with Religious Studies and Arabic.

Hankey published four books and edited seven volumes. His first monograph, God in himself : Aquinas' doctrine of God as expounded in the "Summa theologiae", treated the Neoplatonic sources and structure of the doctrine of God in the Summa Theologica of Thomas Aquinas and was published by Oxford University Press in 1987; OUP republished it in 2000 in its Oxford Scholarly Classics series. According to WorldCat, the book is held in 552 libraries. Since his book One Hundred Years of Neoplatonism in France: A Brief Philosophical History he published three jointly-edited volumes and has in press "Aquinas' Neoplatonism in the Summa Theologiae on God. A Short Introduction", South Bend, Indiana, St Augustine's Press. He published almost 100 academic articles and reviews, and produced many journalistic, theological, and devotional publications and addresses. Since 1997, he was secretary and editor of Dionysius.

Following his retirement, Hankey was appointed Professor Emeritus in Classics at Dalhousie University and taught one evening seminar each academic term, prior to February 2021 when he agreed to step down from the course in light of criminal accusations.

== Legal history ==
=== 1990—91: Allegations of impropriety ===
In 1990 David Harris, who graduated from King's in 1981 and was then an editor for the Chronicle Herald, made an official complaint to both the University of King's College and the Anglican Diocese of Nova Scotia alleging sexual impropriety by Hankey dating from the 1970s during his time as an undergraduate. Harris was 32 at the time of the accusation and the abuses were alleged to have happened when he was a teenager, although it is unclear whether he was a minor. The accusation was made only before the Anglican Diocese and the college; it was not a criminal complaint, and did not involve police or the provincial courts.

The ecclesiastical court, appointed by Bishop Arthur Peters and made up of two priests and a layman, convened in August 1991, and finding Harris' claims credible convicted Hankey on charges of sexual immorality. Hankey was deprived of ecclesiastical duties, and although he remained a priest in the Anglican Church he no longer had any authority to function as one, as he was suspended from practicing any office related to the priesthood or from receiving any benefits of such office. The ecclesiastical court ordered this suspension to hold for an appointed period of two years, during which time Hankey would attend compulsory counselling until such time that he was deemed fit to resume ecclesiastical office—and if not, face defrocking. Hankey refused these rulings however, and converted to Roman Catholicism, so the threat of defrocking was no longer an issue.

In separate proceedings, Hankey was faulted by a King's College disciplinary committee and suspended from the university for one year (the sentence was to take place one year following the committee's ruling, when Hankey was scheduled to return from a year's sabbatical). Hankey resumed his role at King's in 1993, and he became a full professor at Dalhousie in 1996.

==== Earlier allegations ====
Prior to the allegations made in 1991, Hankey faced some scrutiny at King's due to an incident alleged to have occurred in 1983, when it became known that a security guard had found a professor of the college and a male student nude in the university's swimming pool. No official action was taken against Hankey following this incident.

=== 2021: Sexual assault charges ===
In response to a report made to Halifax Regional Police in September 2020, on February 1 the following year Hankey was charged with sexual assault related to an alleged incident with a male student in 1988. The incident allegedly occurred in student housing on the University of King's College campus. Hankey was an employee of the university at the time and was living in residence.

Following an advisory email sent to students and faculty on February 1, 2021, university president William Lahey sent an email to alumni saying that the portrait of Hankey, which had been prominently installed in the King's College Library for his retirement party in 2017, was removed in October 2020 and returned to Hankey. It is not known whether this decision was made by the university based on foreknowledge of the impending criminal charges.

In March 2021, King's College announced that Janice Rubin of Rubin Thomlinson LLP would conduct an independent review concerning the historic incidents that led to the charges laid against Hankey, to determine facts and an appropriate response to the matter. The second part of the review is to make recommendations on the steps King's might take to ensure a safe environment for the community, in accordance with its Sexual Violence Awareness and Response Policy. On May 20, 2021, King's received the interim report from Rubin Thomlinson, a PDF of which was made available to students, faculty, and alumni on May 31, with an affirmation that "the university unequivocally accepts all recommendations set forth in the Interim Report".

The partially redacted final report was released on March 15, 2023.

== Death ==
Before he could stand trial, Hankey died on February 5, 2022, at the age of 77. Initial media reports did not disclose the cause of death, although one report said that he had suffered a heart attack.

== Bibliography ==
- God in Himself, Aquinas' Doctrine of God as Expounded in the Summa Theologiae, Oxford Theological Monographs (Oxford: Oxford University Press, 1987), 196 pages. (Reprinted in 2000 for the Oxford Scholarly Classics series). ISBN 9780198267249
- Pantokrator, the Cosmic Christ: A Theology of Nature. (Charlottetown: St. Peter's Publications, Inc., 2005). ISBN 9780921747253
- Aquinas’ Neoplatonism in the Summa Theologiae on God. A Short Introduction. (South Bend, Indiana: St. Augustine’s Press, 2019). ISBN 9781587310201
