= Morden, Nova Scotia =

Community in Nova Scotia, Canada

Coordinates: 45°6′10.91″N 64°56′44.29″W

Morden in Nova Scotia

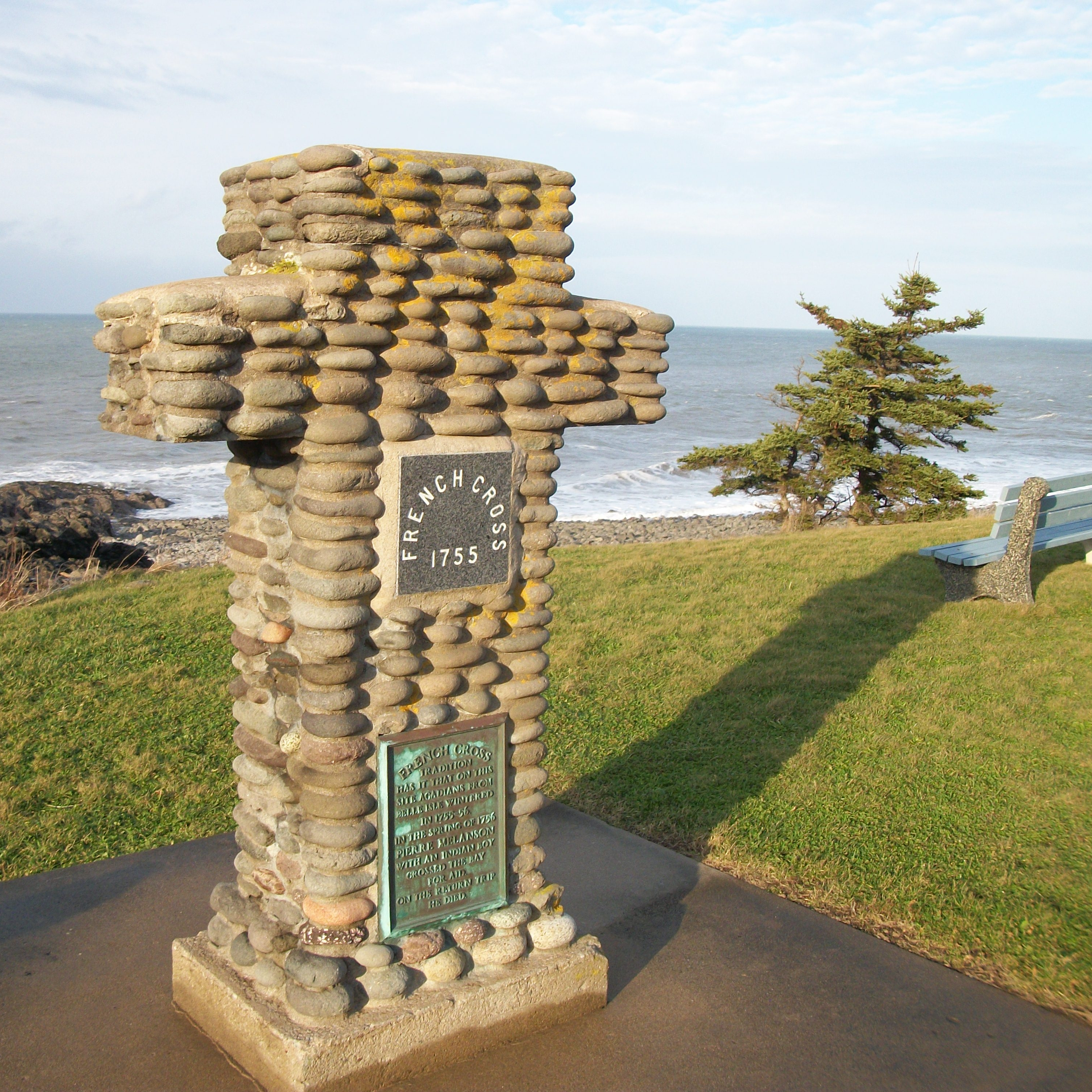
Memorial cross at Morden, Nova Scotia.

Morden is a community in the Canadian province of Nova Scotia, located in Kings County. The community was first known as "French Cross" after a cross marking Acadian refugees who fled the Expulsion of the Acadians in 1755. The village was later named Morden after James Morden who received the first land grant in the area in 1783.

Situated on the Bay of Fundy coast, it had a public wharf and fishing weirs although they have now disappeared. Today Morden hosts a mix of year-round and seasonal residents. The zeolite mineral Mordenite was named for the town of Morden when Henry How discovered it in 1864.

== See also ==
- John Handfield
