= Ptilolite =

Ptilolite may refer to the following zeolite minerals:

- Clinoptilolite
- Mordenite
