= Michael Bishop (literary scholar) =

Canadian academic

- Born: 19 April 1938 (age 88); London, England

Academic background
- Education: Victoria University of Manchester; University of Manitoba; University of Kent at Canterbury
- Thesis: Pierre Reverdy (1977)

Academic work
- Discipline: Literature
- Sub-discipline: French literature
- Institutions: Dalhousie University; University of King's College

Michael Bishop (born 1938) is emeritus McCulloch Professor of French at Dalhousie University and most recently affiliated with the contemporary studies programme at the University of King's College in Halifax, Nova Scotia.

His work focuses largely on contemporary French artists and writers and French women's poetry. He is also a poet, translator, and editor.

He is the director of Éditions VVV Editions, a small publishing house located in Halifax, Nova Scotia.

== Education ==
- B.A. Hons: Victoria University of Manchester, England
- M.A.: University of Manitoba, Canada
- Ph.D.: University of Kent at Canterbury, England

== Published works ==
- Vérités d'hiver/Winter Truths. William Blake & Co., 2024. Poèmes, édition bilingue.
- The Secret Life of James William Bishop, Éditons VVV Editions, 2023.
- Jean-Paul Michel : Le 'là' de l'être-là et la présence à soi du 'poème-comme-poème'. William Blake & Co., 2024. Traduction de Michael Bishop, édition bilingue.
- La grande arborescence, NU(e) 81, Poesibao, 2023. 17 études sur la poésie féminine contemporaine.
- Jenn-Paul Michel : Un feu se ces feux - ne savoir, Éditions VVV, 2023. Traduction de Michael Bishop. Édition bilingue.
- Earth and Mind : Dreaming, Writing, Being. Nine Contemporary French Poets. Brill, 2018.
- Dystopie et poïein, agnose et reconnaissance. Seize études sur la poésie française et francophone contemporaine. Rodopi, 2014.
- Béatrice Bonhomme : Deux paysages pour, entre les deux, dormir. Éditions VVV, 2018. Accompagné d'un Palimpseste de Michael Bishop.
- Yves Bonnefoy's La grande ourse : Two Essays. Éditions VVV, 2016. With Aaron Prevots.
- Genesis Now, followed by The Theory of Love. Éditions VVV, 2009.
- Contemporary French Art 1. Rodopi, 2008
- Contemporary French Art 2. Rodopi, 2011.
- Snowing, followed by Grace. Éditions VVV, 2007.
- La genèse maintenant, suivi de La théorie de l'amour. William Blake & Co., 2010
- Michel Deguy. Rodopi, CRMLFC VII, 1988.
- René Char. Les dernières années. Rodopi, CMRLFC, XIV, 1990.
- Nineteenth-Century French Poetry. Twayne Publishers, New York, 1993.
- Salah Stétié : Cold Water Shielded. Selected Poems. Bloodaxe Books / UNESCO, 2000. Edited, translated and introduced by Michael Bishop.
- The Contemporary Poetry of France. Rodopi, 1985
- Jacques Prévert. From Film and Theater to Poetry, Art and Song. Rodopi, CHIASMA 12, 2002.
- Thirty Voices in the Feminine. Rodopi, Faux Titre 114, 1996. Edited by Michael Bishop.
- Jean-Paul Michel : Un cri, chose et signe. Éditions VVV, 2021. Translation by Michael Bishop.*
- Contemporary French Women Poets, volume 1. CHIASMA, Rodopi, 1995.
- Contemporary French Women Poets, volume 2. CHIASMA, Rodopi, 1995.
- Marie Joqueviel : Le corps des disparus, Le Corps des vivants. Éditions VVV, 2021. Traduction de Michael Bishop.
- Women's Poetry in France 1965-1995. A bi←lingual anthology selected, translated and introduced by Michael Bishop.
- Esther Tellermann : Nos racines se ressemblent. Édition VVV, 2022. Traduction et Reflets de Michael Bishop.
- Poésie, langue, image. Dalhousie French Studies, 111, 2018. Études dirigées par Michael Bishop et Christopher Elson.
- Altérités d'André du Bouchet. De Hugo, Shakespeare et Poussin à Celan, Mandelstam et Giacometti. Rodopi, CMRLFC XXXVIII, 2003.
- Jean-Paul Michel : Placer l'être en face de lui-même. Carnets de Sicile (été 1994). William Blake & Co./Éditions VVV, 2010. Translation by Michael Bishop.
- Fluvial, Agnose et autres poèmes. Editions de la revue NU(e), 2014.
- French Prose in 2000. Faux Titre, Rodopi, 2002. Edited with Christopher Elaon.
- André du Bouchet : Un m0t : ce n'est pas le sens... Éditions VVV, 2013. Trois inédits préparés par Victor Martinez, avec La langue biface de V. Martinez; traductions et Le point monde de Michael Bishop.
- The Endless Theory of Days. The Art and Poetry of Gérard Titus-Carmel. CHIASMA 22, Rodopi, 2007.
- Yves Bonnefoy : Passant, veux-tu savoir? précédé de Alès Stenar. Éditions VVV, 2006. Traduction de Michael Bishop.
- Yves Bonnefoy aujourd'hui. Dalhousie French Studies, 60, 2002. Etudes réunies par Michael Bishop et ChrisTopher Elson.
- Jean-Luc Nancy : Langue apocryphe. Editions VVV, 2014. Tradction de Michael Bishop.
- 'Quand on vient d'un monde d'Idées, la surprise est énorme...'. William Blake & Co./Editions VVV, 2013. 40 poèmes choisis, traduits et postfacés par Michael Bishop.
- Gérard Titus-Carmel : Quatre images mémorables : Picasso, Ernst, Caillebottte, Bram. Editions VVV, 2009. Translation and postface by Michael Bishop.
- La Poésie québecoise depuis 1975. Dalhousie French Studes, 1980. Essais, tÉmoignages et inédits dirigés par Eva Kushner et Michael Bishop.
- Bernard Noël : La bouche du temps. Editions VVV, 2015. Traduction de Michael Bishop.
- 'Jean-Paul Michel : 'Stupeur et joie de devoirs nouveaux'. Editions VVV, 2009. Translation by Michael Bishop.
- Yves Bonnefoy : Disorder, précédé de Poésie et théâtre. Editions VVV, 2012. Translation by Michael Bishop.
- Yves Bonnefoy : Une variante de la sortie du jardin, suivi de Bouche Bée. Editions VVV, 2006. Traduction et Note de Michael Bishop.
- Salah Stétié : Night of Substance. Editions VVV, 2008. Translation by Michael Bishop.
- Christian Jaccard : The Art of Fire and Knot-works. Editions VVV, 2005. Translation by Michael Bishop.
- Simone de Beauvoir et les féminismes contemporains. Dalhousie French Studies, 13, 1987. Études dirigées par Nicole Trèves et Michael Bishop.
- Salah Stétié : Fluidité de la mort. Editions VVV, 2007. Traduction de Michael Bishop.
