= Colin Starnes =

Colin John Starnes is a professor, author, and former President of the University of King's College in Halifax, Nova Scotia, Canada.

Starnes joined the faculty of King's in 1972, and the Dalhousie University faculty in 1977. He taught at both of the linked universities, retiring in 2005. Although he is retired, he still lectures on certain topics in the Foundation Year Programme at King's, including The Divine Comedy. He holds degrees from Bishop's University, Harvard University, McGill University, and Dalhousie.

Starnes was the President of King's from 1993 until 2003. He replaced Marion Golda Fry and was succeeded by William Barker.

Starnes is an authority on Saint Augustine and Thomas More. His published works include the book The New Republic: A Commentary on Book I of More's Utopia Showing Its Relation to Plato's Republic (Wilfrid Laurier University Press 1990), and Augustine's Conversion: A Guide to the Argument of Confessions, I-IX. He contributed a paper on Virgil and Plato to a volume commemorating the philosopher James Doull, and in addition has published a number of articles in Dionysius and elsewhere.

The civil servant, diplomat, and novelist John Kennett Starnes was his father and his brother is the novelist Patrick Starnes.
