= Laura Penny =

Canadian academic

- Born: Cape Breton, Nova Scotia, Canada
- Occupation: author
- Writing career
- Period: 2000s–present
- Notable works: Your Call is Important to Us: The Truth About Bullshit, More Money Than Brains: Why School Sucks, College is Crap, and Idiots Think They're Right

Laura Penny (born 1975) is a Canadian academic and the author of the bestselling Your Call is Important to Us: The Truth About Bullshit, a study of the phenomenon of bullshit and its role in modern society.

== Education ==
Penny holds a PhD in Comparative Literature from the University at Buffalo.

== Academic career ==
From 2002 to 2006, she taught at the University of King's College in Halifax, Nova Scotia, where she was a Senior Fellow in the Foundation Year Programme. She then went on to teach at Halifax's Mount Saint Vincent University and Saint Mary's University while still giving occasional lectures at King's College. Penny published More Money Than Brains: Why School Sucks, College is Crap, and Idiots Think They're Right, a consideration of anti-intellectualism and a defence of the arts and humanities in 2010. Penny was featured on 60 Minutes with Princeton professor Harry Frankfurt, author of the similarly themed treatise, On Bullshit. Penny is an occasional contributor to The Globe and Mail. She has also written for the National Post, Saturday Night, Chatelaine, and Toronto Life (for which she is also a contributing editor). As of March 2015, she has returned to King's, teaching courses in the Contemporary Studies & Early Modern Studies programs.

== Bibliography ==
- — (2005). Your Call Is Important To Us: The Truth About Bullshit. Crown. ISBN 978-1-4000-8103-5. OCLC 58563184.
- — (2010). More Money Than Brains: Why School Sucks, College is Crap, and Idiots Think They're Right. McClelland & Stewart. ISBN 978-0-7710-7048-8. OCLC 440089889.
