= Howlite =

Inoborate mineral

General
- Category: Inoborates
- Formula: Ca_{2}B_{5}SiO_{9}(OH)_{5}
- IMA symbol: How
- Strunz classification: 6.CB.20
- Dana classification: 25.3.5.1
- Crystal system: Monoclinic
- Crystal class: Prismatic (2/m) (same H-M symbol)
- Space group: P2_{1}/c
- Unit cell: a = 12.82 Å, b = 9.351(1) Å c = 8.608(2) Å; β = 104.84(2)°; Z = 4

Identification
- Color: White, colorless
- Crystal habit: Massive to nodular, occurs as tabular prisms flattened parallel to [100]
- Cleavage: None
- Fracture: Conchoidal, uneven
- Mohs scale hardness: 3.5
- Luster: Subvitreous, glimmering
- Streak: white
- Diaphaneity: Translucent
- Specific gravity: 2.53 – 2.59
- Optical properties: Biaxial (−), colorless (transmitted light)
- Refractive index: n_{α} = 1.583 – 1.586 n_{β} = 1.596 – 1.598 n_{γ} = 1.600
- Birefringence: δ = 0.017
- 2V angle: 73°

Howlite, a calcium borosilicate hydroxide (Ca_{2}B_{5}SiO_{9}(OH)_{5}), is a borate mineral found in evaporite deposits.

== History ==
Howlite was discovered near Windsor, Nova Scotia, in 1868 by Henry How (1828–1879), a Canadian chemist, geologist, and mineralogist. How was alerted to the unknown mineral by miners in a gypsum quarry, who found it to be a nuisance. He called the new mineral silico-boro-calcite; it was given the name howlite by the American geologist James Dwight Dana shortly thereafter.

== Geology ==
The most common form of howlite is irregular nodules, sometimes resembling cauliflower. Crystals of howlite are rare, having been found in only a couple localities worldwide. Crystals were first reported from Tick Canyon in the Sierra Pelona Mountains of California, and later at Iona, Nova Scotia. Crystals reach a maximum size of about one centimeter. The nodules are white with fine grey or black veins in an erratic, often web-like pattern, opaque with a sub-vitreous luster. The crystals at Iona are colorless, white or brown and are often translucent or transparent.

Its structure is monoclinic with a Mohs hardness of 3.5 and lacks regular cleavage. Crystals are prismatic and flattened on {100}. The crystals from Tick Canyon are elongated along the 010 axis, while those from Iona are elongated along the 001 axis.

== Jewelry ==
Howlite is commonly used to make decorative objects such as small carvings or jewelry components. Because of its porous texture, howlite can be easily dyed to imitate other minerals, especially turquoise because of the superficial similarity of the veining patterns. Howlite is also sold in its natural state, sometimes under the trade names of "white turquoise" or "white buffalo turquoise," or the derived name "white buffalo stone" and is used to produce jewelry similar to how turquoise is used. Varieties of the unrelated gemstone turquoise which are white instead of the typical blue or green color have been mined in the US States of Arizona and Nevada, and are also marketed as "white buffalo turquoise". Most of the white varieties of turquoise are chalk-like with a Mohs hardness of 1, and are not as hard or durable as howlite, and subsequently require stabilization in order to be used in jewelry, which has resulted in howlite being more popular for use in jewelry than the artificially stabilized white forms of the mineral turquoise.

== Gallery ==
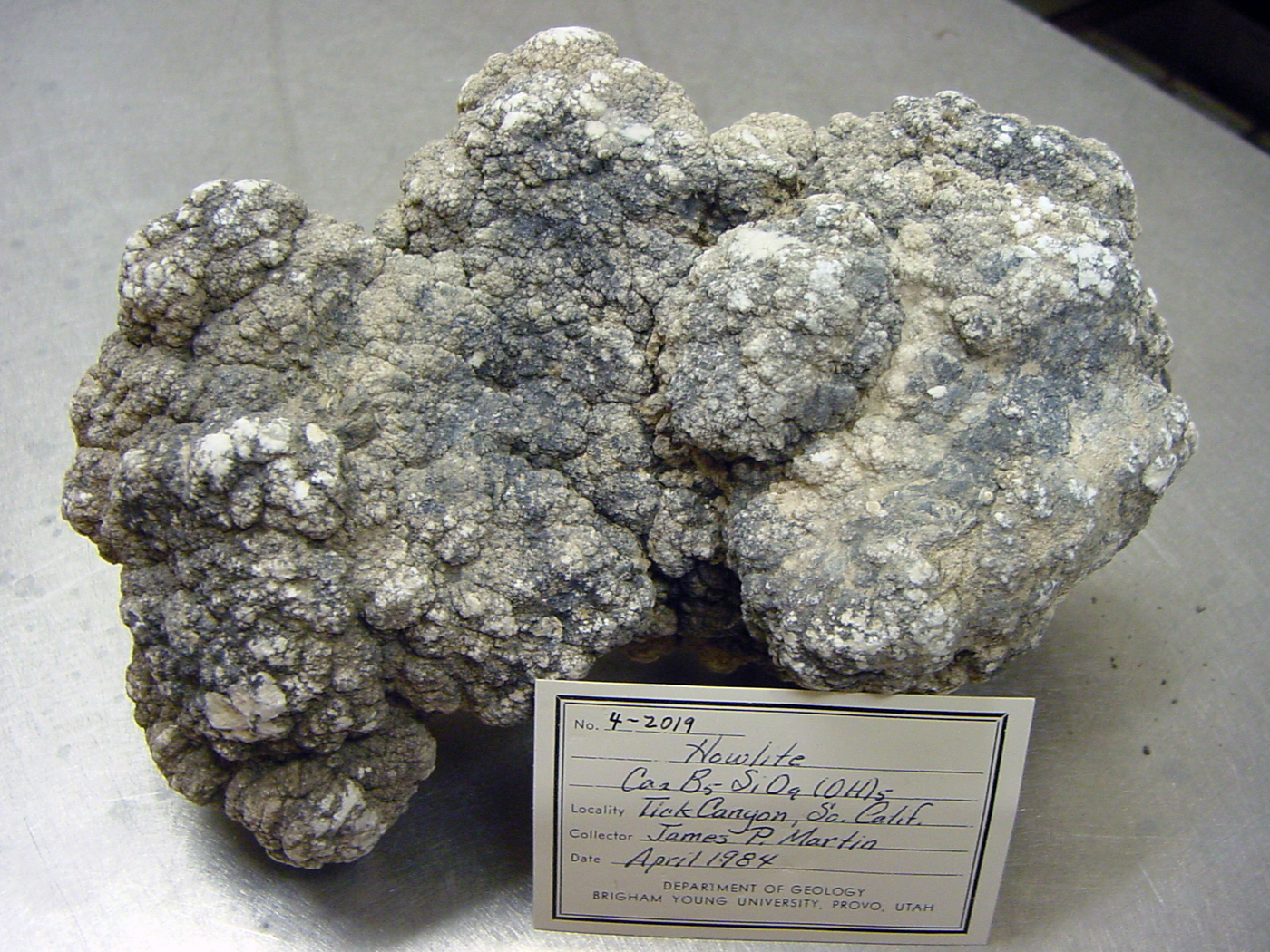
Howlite, as collected, southern California.

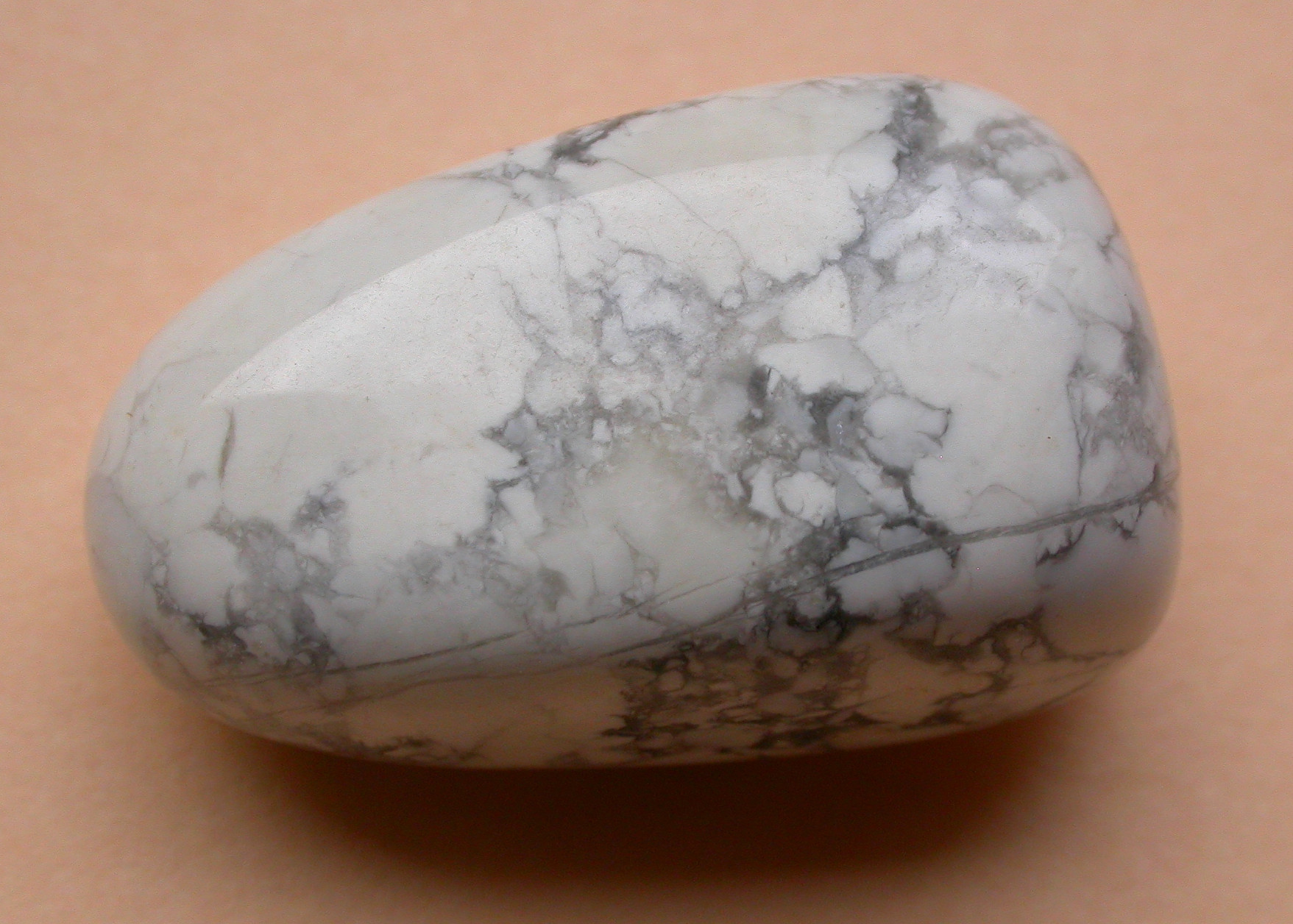
A polished mass showing veining.

Form of howlite crystals from Iona, Nova Scotia.

Form of howlite crystals from Tick Canyon, California.

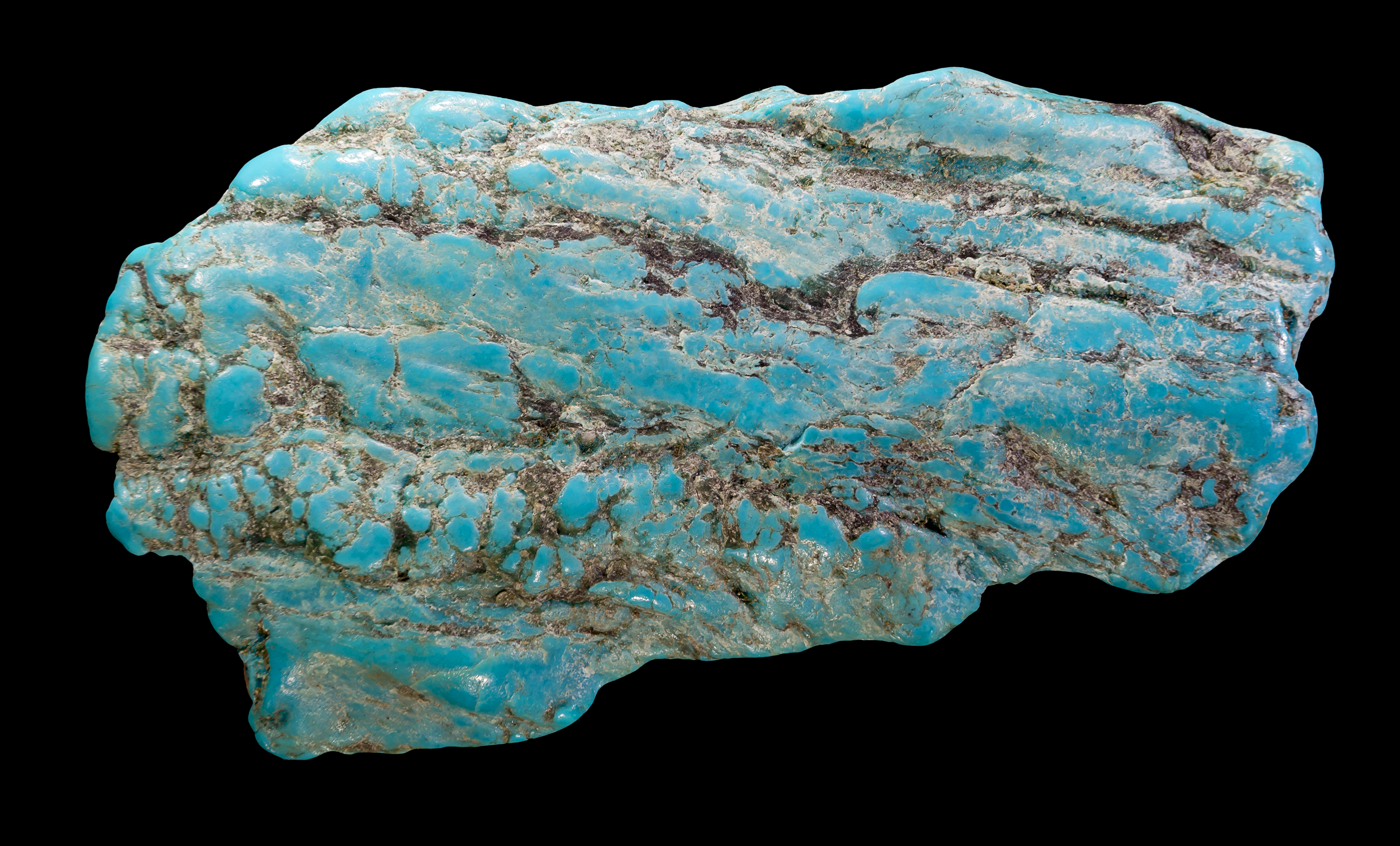
Howlite artificially colored in blue, and sold under the name turquenite.

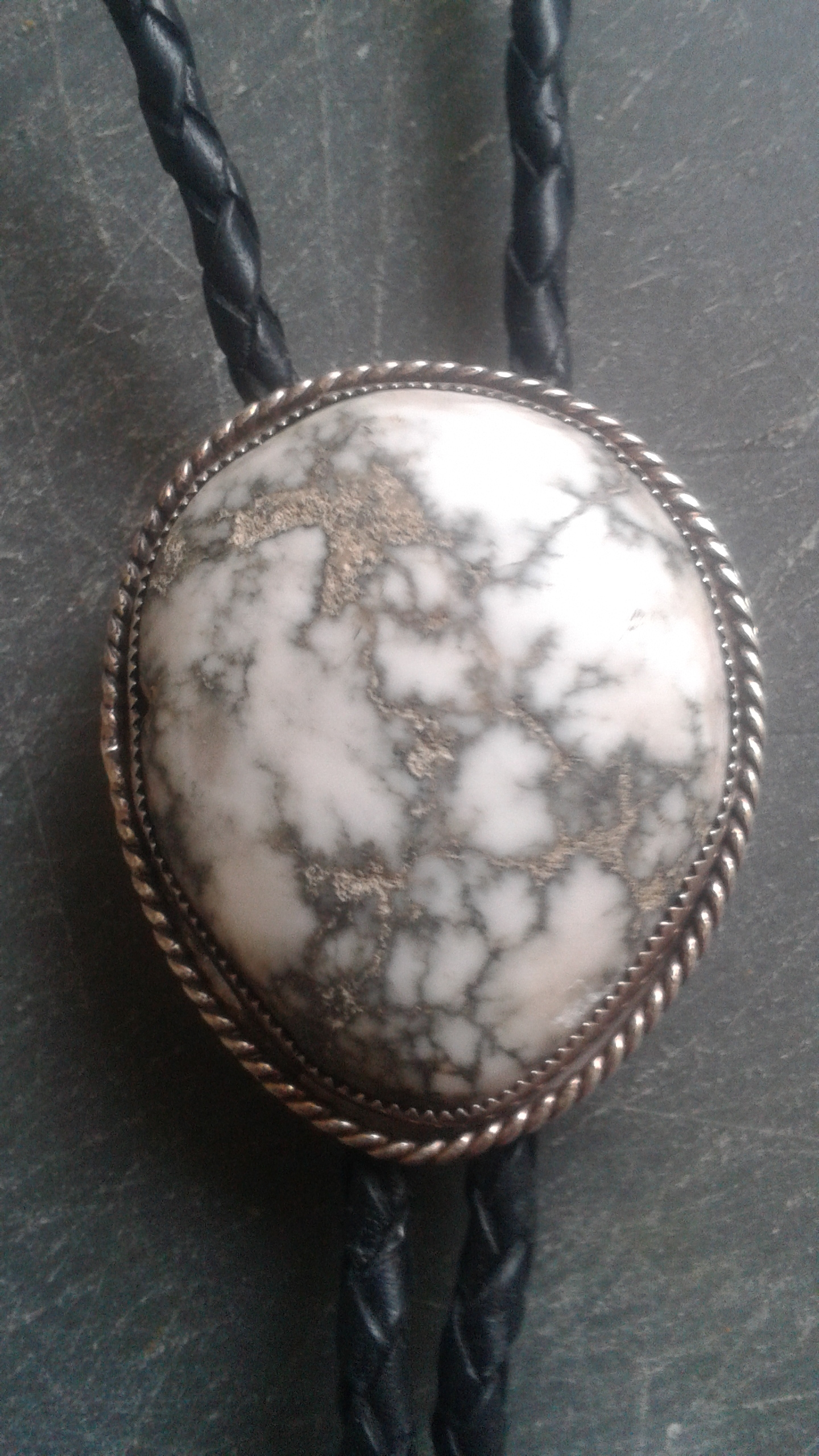
Howlite and Silver Bolo tie with small inclusions of tiny, brownish howlite crystals. This howlite specimen is from Tick Canyon

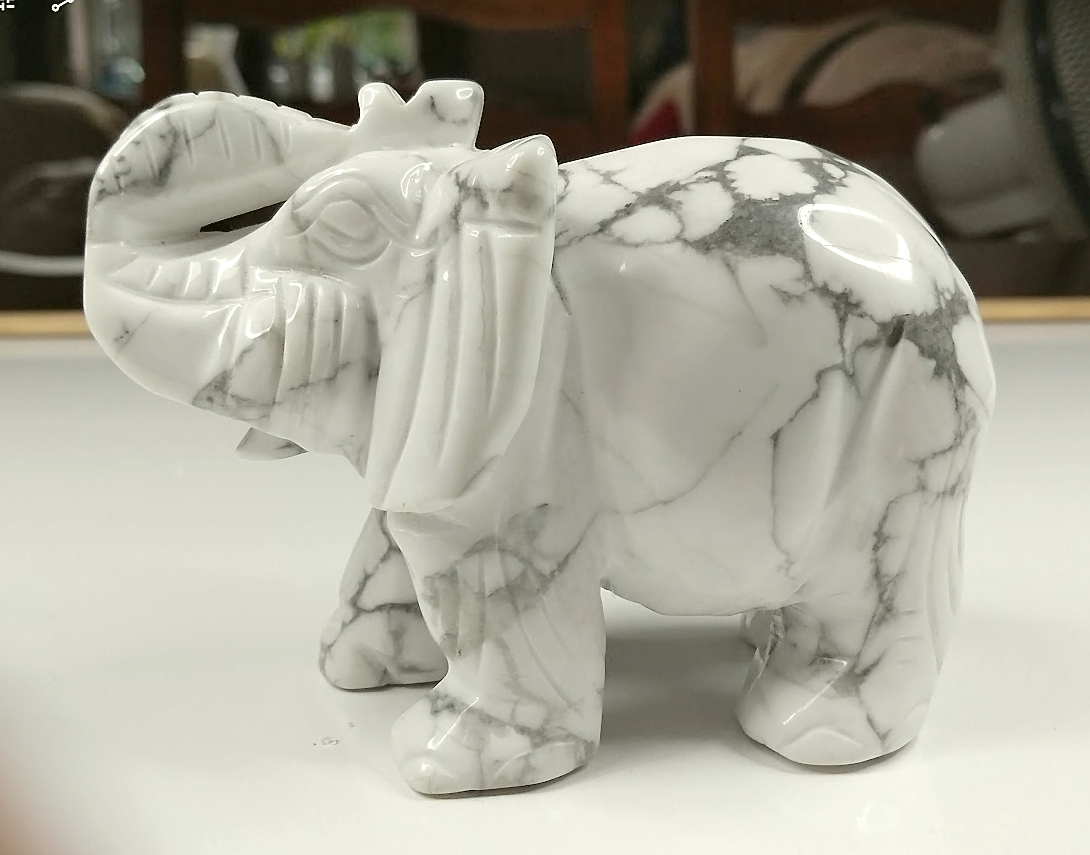
Elephant carved from howlite. Length 10 cm (4 in).

== See also ==
- List of minerals
- List of minerals named after people
- Borate minerals

== Bibliography ==
- Palache, P.; Berman H.; Frondel, C. (1960). "Dana's System of Mineralogy, Volume II: Halides, Nitrates, Borates, Carbonates, Sulfates, Phosphates, Arsenates, Tungstates, Molybdates, Etc. (Seventh Edition)" John Wiley and Sons, Inc., New York, pp. 362–363.
