= William Lahey =

Canadian lawyer and university Vice-Chancellor

Gerard William Lahey
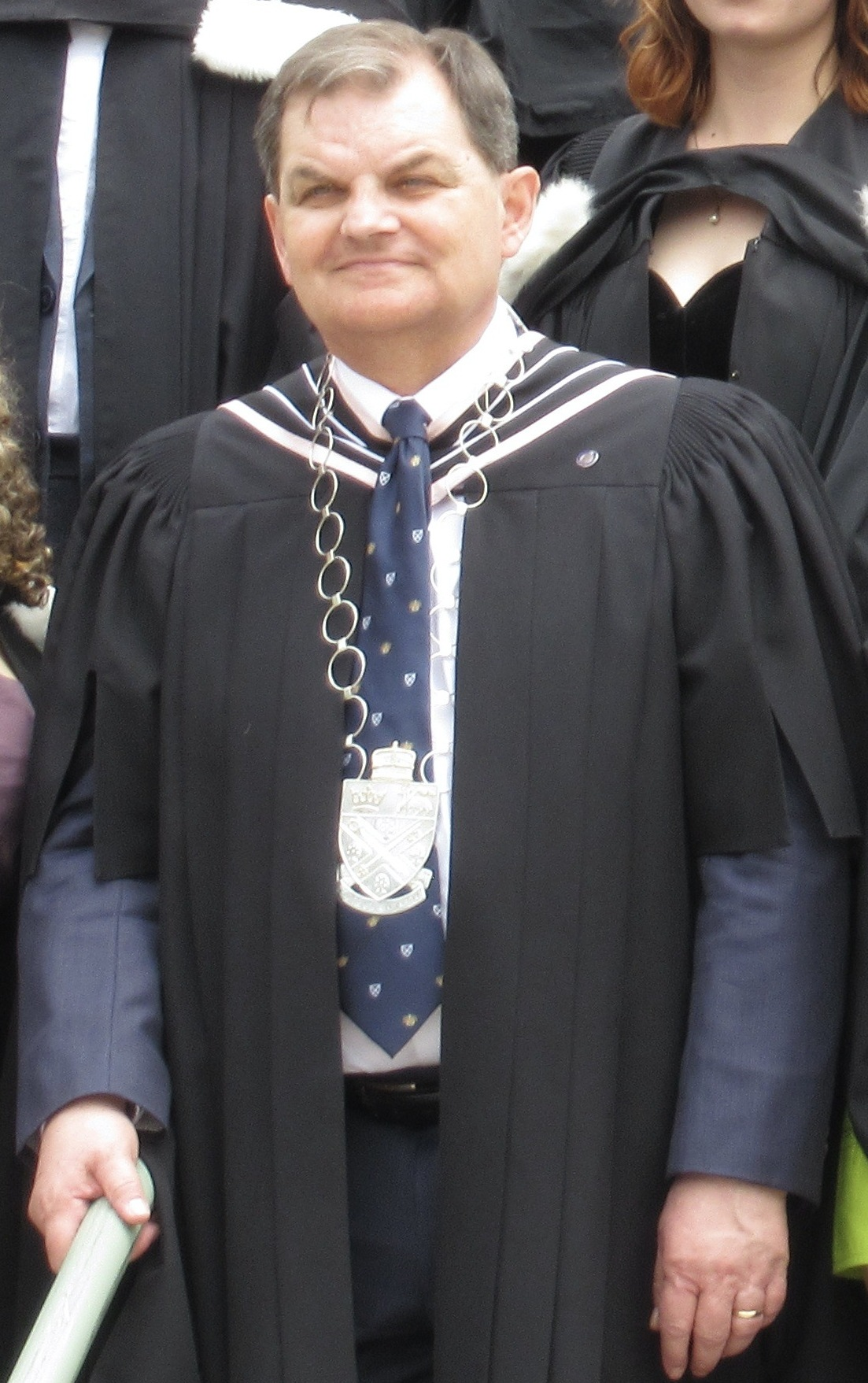
- Lahey in 2022 at the University of King's College
- Born: May 30, 1961 (age 65); Miramichi, New Brunswick
- Education: Mount Allison University (B.A.); Oxford University (B.A. Juris.); University of Toronto (LL.M.)
- Occupations: President and vice-chancellor of the University of King's College

William Lahey (born May 30, 1961 in Miramichi, New Brunswick) is a Canadian lawyer, public servant, and the 25th president and vice-chancellor of the University of King's College in Halifax, Nova Scotia.

Lahey received his undergraduate arts degree from Mount Allison University, followed by degrees in jurisprudence from Oxford University, where he was a Rhodes Scholar, and a Master of Laws from the University of Toronto.

Lahey began his career as clerk for Mr. Justice La Forest of the Supreme Court of Canada and later practiced with the Halifax firm of McInnes, Cooper & Robertson. After eight years in the Nova Scotia public service, including as Assistant Deputy Minister of Health, he joined the faculty of Dalhousie University’s Schulich School of Law in 2001, where he remains a professor and where he served as the director of the Dalhousie Health Law Institute between 2007 and 2011. From 2004 to 2007 he was deputy minister of Nova Scotia’s Department of Environment and Labour, on leave from Dalhousie Law School.

As Deputy Minister, Department of Environment and Labour from 2004 to 2007, Lahey spearheaded the development of the Environmental Goals and Sustainable Prosperity Act, a far-reaching piece of legislation designed to "improve environmental law and policy and to make Nova Scotia a leader in integrating economic growth and environmental protection objectives."

Lahey became the 25th President and Vice-Chancellor of the University of King's College on 1 July 2016. Lahey was reappointed to serve another five-year term on January 14, 2021.

In August 2018, Lahey published An Independent Review of Forest Practices in Nova Scotia which proposes a shift toward a so-called "new paradigm of 'ecological forestry'". The sustainable forestry practices proposed in the "Lahey Report", including but not limited to reduced clearcutting on Crown lands, are currently under consideration by the Nova Scotia Ministry of Land and Forests. During the 2021 Liberal leadership race Iain Rankin pledged to implement the Lahey Report in its entirety by the end of 2021, this was cut short however by a Progressive Conservative upset victory in the 2021 Nova Scotia general election.

In December 2024, the University of King’s College Board of Governors announced that Lahey would not seek to extend his term as president beyond his current contract, which is set to conclude on June 30, 2026, following a ten-year tenure.
