= Mordenite =

Zeolite mineral

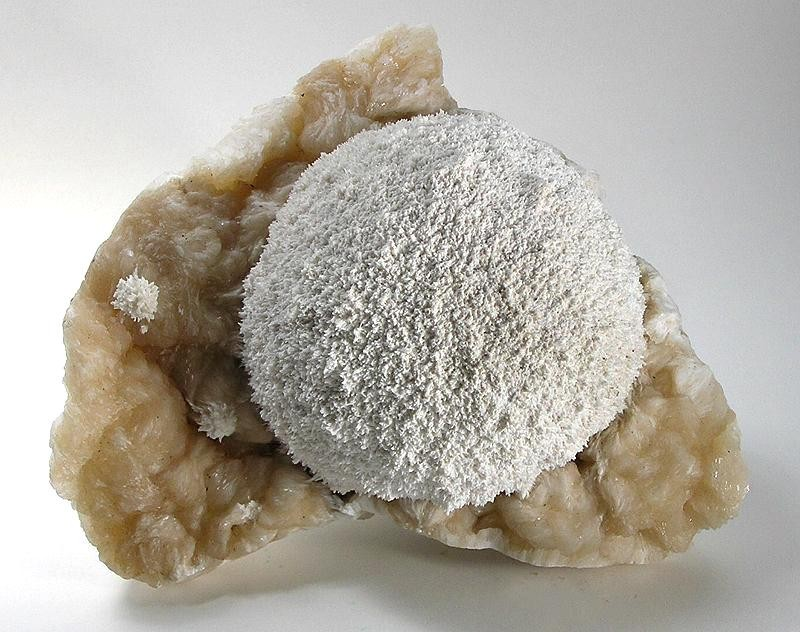

General
- Category: Tectosilicate minerals
- Group: Zeolite group
- Formula: (Na_{2},Ca,K_{2})_{4}(Al_{8}Si_{40})O_{96}·28H_{2}O
- IMA symbol: Mor
- Strunz classification: 9.GD.35
- Crystal system: Orthorhombic
- Crystal class: Pyramidal (mm2) (same H-M symbol)
- Space group: Cmc2_{1}

Identification
- Crystal habit: radiating crystals, fibrous asbestiform needles

Mordenite is a zeolite mineral with the chemical formula (Na_{2},Ca,K_{2})_{4}(Al_{8}Si_{40})O_{96}·28H_{2}O. and it is one of the six most abundant zeolites and is used commercially.

It was first described in 1864 by Henry How. He named it after the small community of Morden, Nova Scotia, Canada, along the Bay of Fundy, where it was first found.

Mordenite is orthorhombic (a,b,c unequal & all angles 90 degree). It crystallizes in the form of fibrous aggregates, masses, and vertically striated prismatic crystals. It may be colorless, white, or faintly yellow or pink. It has Mohs hardness of 5 and a density of 2.1 g/cm^{3}. When it forms well developed crystals they are hairlike; very long, thin, and delicate.

Mordenite’s molecular structure is a framework containing chains of five-membered rings of linked silicate and aluminate tetrahedra (four oxygen atoms arranged at the points of a triangular pyramid about a central silicon or aluminium atom). Its high ratio of silicon to aluminum atoms makes it more resistant to attack by acids than most other zeolites.

Mordenite is one of the most abundant zeolites in altered volcanic deposits; it is found in volcanic rock such as rhyolite, andesite, and basalt. It is associated with other zeolites such as stilbite and heulandite. Good examples have been found in Iceland, India, Italy, Oregon, Washington, and Idaho. It is also found in marine sediments, as in the Ural Mountains and in dikes where water has attacked and altered volcanic glasses, as on the Isle of Arran in Scotland.

== Use ==
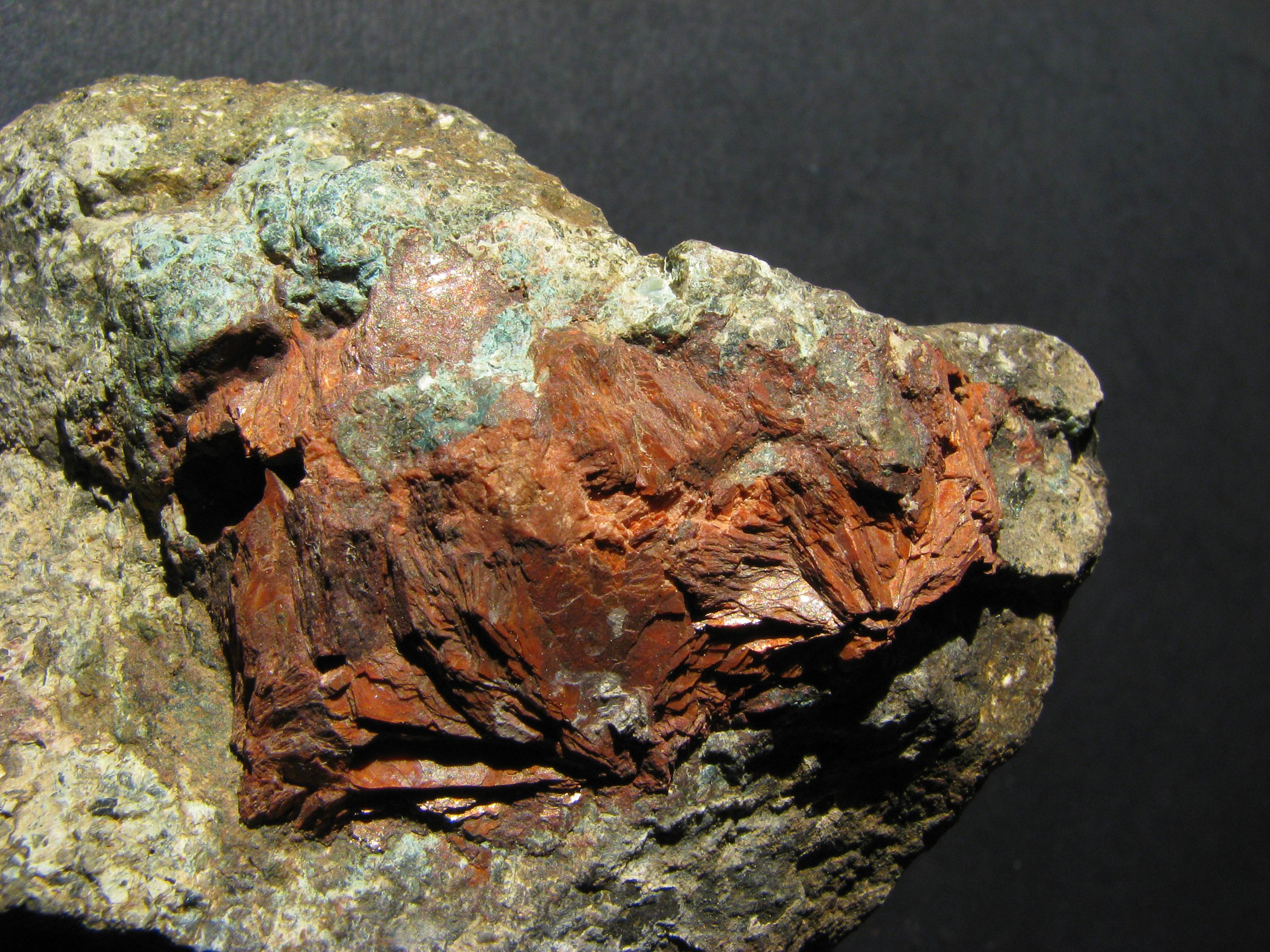
Mordenite from Italy

- Synthetic Mordenite is used as a catalyst in the petrochemical industry for the acid-catalyzed isomerisation of alkanes and aromatics.
- In New Zealand mordenite-bearing zeolitic tuff is dried and crushed to produce a variety of products including adsorbents for soaking up oil/chemical spills and animal wastes, animal feed supplements, water treatment, and sports turf and slow release fertilizer.
- Sedimentary deposits of mordenite are present in several countries, especially in Bulgaria, Hungary, Japan and the United States. Quarried material is generally substantial, e.g., a recent estimate of the yearly production in Japan is 150,000 tons.
- Apart from generic applications in the fields of agriculture and building industry (as dimension stone), uses are known as sorbent and molecular sieve
- Gas separation processes are reported for the production of high-grade O_{2} from air by pressure-swing operating generators. Full-scale plants based on mordenite-rich tuffs have been operating in Japan since the end of the 1960.
