= Henry How =

British-Canadian chemist, geologist and mineralogist

- Born: 11 July 1828; London, England
- Died: 28 September 1879 (aged 51); Windsor, Nova Scotia, Canada
- Education: Royal College of Chemistry
- Scientific career
- Fields: Geology

Henry How (11 July 1828 – 28 September 1879) was a British-Canadian chemist, geologist and mineralogist.

== Career ==
In 1847, How and August Wilhelm von Hofmann were co-workers at the Royal College in London. How was a professor of chemistry and natural history at King's College in Windsor, Nova Scotia.

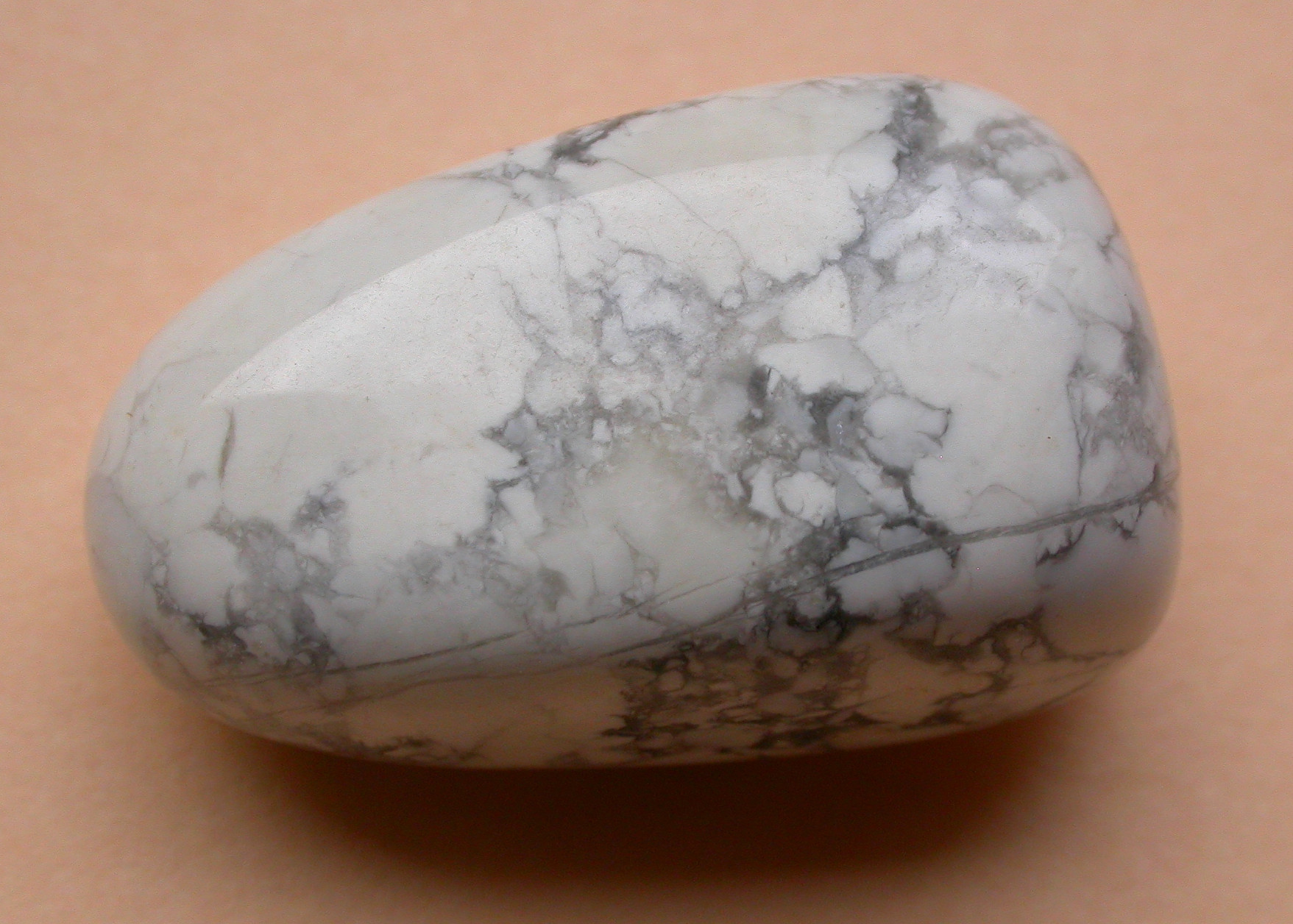
The mineral howlite is named for Henry How.

In 1864 How published the description of a new zeolite mineral, that he named mordenite, from along the shores of the Bay of Fundy. In 1868, he described a new borate mineral found just south of Windsor. How named it silicoborocalcite but was renamed howlite in his honor by James Dwight Dana. He studied many other zeolites and related minerals from the Bay of Fundy basalts, borates from the gypsum and anhydrite deposits, as well as ores of manganese and iron.

== Personal life ==
How married Louisa Mary Watkins (11 May 1830 - 9 July 1910) and they had five children. The grave of one of their children is next to Henry How's and reads, Louisa P. Juliet, second child of Henry How and Louisa M. How, died 8 July 1862 aged 4 years and 6 months.

Gravestone of Henry How, Windsor, Nova Scotia

== Publications ==
- (1857) On the Occurrence of Natro-Boro-Calcite with Glauber Salt in the Gypsum of Nova Scotia. The Edinburgh New Philosophical Journal, 6, 54-60.
- (1858) Chemical Analysis of Faroelite and some other Zeolites occurring in Nova Scotia. American Journal of Science and Arts, Second Series, 26(77), 30-34.
- (1861) On Natro-boro-calcite and another Borate occurring in the Gypsum of Nova Scotia. The American Journal of Science and Arts, Second Series, 32, 9-13.
- (1864) On mordenite, a new mineral from the trap of Nova Scotia. Journal of the Chemical Society, 17, 100-104.
- (1866) Contributions to the Mineralogy of Nova Scotia, Pt. I, Manganite, Pyrolusite, Wad. Philosophical Magazine, 165-170.
- (1867) On the waters of the mineral springs of Wilmot, N.S. Proceedings and Transactions of the Nova Scotian Institute of Natural Science, 1(2), 26-33.
- (1867) On magnesia-alum, or pickeringite, containing a little nickel and cobalt, occurring in slate in Hants Co.. Nova Scotian Institute of Natural Science, 1, 85-87.
- (1867) Notes on the economic mineralogy of Nova Scotia, Part 1. Proceedings and Transactions of the Nova Scotian Institute of Natural Science, 1(2), 78-86.
- (1867) Notice of the occurrence of a trilobite in the lower carboniferous limestone of Hants. Co. Proceedings and Transactions of the Nova Scotian Institute of Natural Science, 1(1), 87-88.
- (1867) Notes on the economic mineralogy of Nova Scotia, Part II: The ores of manganese and their uses. Proceedings and Transactions of the Nova Scotian Institute of Natural Science, 1(3), 128-138.
- (1867) Notes on the economic mineralogy of Nova Scotia: Part III.; limestone and marble. Proceedings and Transactions of the Nova Scotian Institute of Natural Science, 1(4), 58-66.
- (1867) Remarks on the minerals prepared for the Paris Exhibition. Proceedings and Transactions of the Nova Scotian Institute of Natural Science, 2(1), 25-35.
- (1867) On some brine springs of Nova Scotia. Proceedings and Transactions of the Nova Scotian Institute of Natural Science, 1(3), 75-80.
- (1868) II. Contributions to the mineralogy of Nova Scotia. III. Borates and other minerals in anhydrite and gypsum. Silicoborocalcite, a new mineral. The London, Edinburgh, and Dublin Philosophical Magazine and Journal of Science, 35, 32-41.
- (1868) Notes on the economic mineralogy of Nova Scotia. Part IV: Gypsum and anhydrite and the borates and other minerals they contain. Proceedings and Transactions of the Nova Scotian Institute of Natural Science, 2(2), 26-36.
- (1969) The Mineralogy of Nova Scotia. A Report to the Provincial Government. Charles Annand (Publisher), Halifax, Nova Scotia.
- (1869) Notes on the economic mineralogy of Nova Scotia: Part V., coals and allied minerals. Proceedings and Transactions of the Nova Scotian Institute of Natural Science, 2(3), 128-140.
- (1870) Contributions to the Mineralogy of Nova Scotia, Part 5. Philosophical Magazine and Journal of Science, Fourth Series, 275-280.
- (1872) Brief notes on the flora of Nova Scotia. Part I. Proceedings and Transactions of the Nova Scotian Institute of Natural Science, 3(2), 174-176.
- (1875) On the analysis of two Spring Hill coals. Proceedings and Transactions of the Nova Scotian Institute of Natural Science, 4(1), 98-101.
- (1877) Additions to the list of Nova Scotian plants. Proceedings and Transactions of the Nova Scotian Institute of Natural Science, (4)3, 312-341.
- (1878) The East Indian herbarium of King's College, Windsor. Proceedings and Transactions of the Nova Scotian Institute of Natural Science, 4(4), 369-379.
- Contributions to the Mineralogy of Nova Scotia 1868-78

== See also ==
- Howlite
- List of minerals named after people
