= Michael Bate =

Canadian media entrepreneur

- Born: 1947 (age 78–79); England
- Occupation: Media entrepreneur
- Known for: Founder of the Ottawa edition of Frank

Michael Bate (born c. 1947) is a Canadian media entrepreneur and one of the founders of the Ottawa edition of gossip magazine Frank.

Born in England, he grew up in Canada, attending the University of Victoria in 1965, and later studying history at Carleton. Bate was a long time Ottawa musician (pedal steel guitar) who worked as a radio producer and as a computer games developer (working on such titles as B.C.'s Quest for Tires, B.C. II: Grog's Revenge, and Ace of Aces). He also worked as a reporter for Canadian Press.

In 1989, Bate became a business partner with David Bentley to expand Frank from its Halifax roots by launching an Ottawa edition. Bentley eventually returned to Halifax and, under Bate's direction, the Ottawa edition of Frank grew in the mid-1990s. Paid circulation of the magazine peaked at under 20,000 copies nationally but it earned a notoriety that far exceeded its readership. The magazine infuriated then-Prime Minister Brian Mulroney for a mock contest to "deflower" his daughter. Mulroney said in a television interview that he "wanted to take a gun and go down there and do serious damage to these people". Bate defended the piece as an attempt to show that the unpopular prime minister was exploiting his daughter for political gain.

Soon after he started at Frank, he was named by Chatelaine magazine as one of Canada's sexiest men. Robert Fulford, for example, called him Frank's "slanderer-in-chief"

Bate purchased Bentley's share of Ottawa Frank during the 1990s and later sold the franchise to Fabrice Taylor in 2003. Taylor moved the magazine's headquarters to Toronto and said he planned to turn it into a serious satire magazine. Circulation declined after the sale and the magazine went out of business in December 2004.

Bate regained ownership of the property and started an online version of the Ottawa edition of the magazine called eFrank.ca on September 27, 2005, with a print version following in late November 2005. Within a month of publication, his new venture had its first lawsuit. For a publisher who thrived on controversy, Bate was pleased, "It's just like the old days. Now it's official. We're back." Bate decided to cease publishing in October 2008 as subscriptions had declined once again. Frank, said Bate, was a victim of the Internet. At the time, Bate said he was contemplating a book on the publication's controversial run.

In an interview with The Globe and Mail in May 2013, he said the new Frank would have a metered paywall, which would enable readers to read a few stories before having to pay "about 50 cents a day, or $15 a month." In the past two years, hundreds of publications, large and small, have erected paywalls. Bate pointed to Andrew Sullivan's The Dish, which instituted a metered paywall earlier in the year, as a financial model for the new Frank.

Bate is featured prominently in the 2001 muckraking documentary film The Frank Truth which premiered at the Toronto International Film Festival.
