= Media in Halifax, Nova Scotia =

Halifax, Nova Scotia, is the largest population centre in Atlantic Canada and contains the region's largest collection of media outlets.

== Radio ==
As of 2009, all radio stations in Halifax broadcast on the FM dial. Halifax's last AM radio station 780 CFDR moved to the FM dial at 92.9 MHz in the summer of 2009, becoming CFLT-FM. CFDR had previously been licensed to move to 88.9 FM, however the subsequent purchase of CKUL by parent company Newcap Broadcasting made this conversion impossible due to concentration of media ownership rules. Sale to Rogers Communications was approved by the CRTC on November 24, 2008, and the station has moved to FM 92.9 and started up August 7, 2009 at 12:00 pm AST.

On July 29, 2016, CJCH-FM was rebranded to "Virgin Radio" marking the first ever entry into the Atlantic Canadian market for that branding.

Frequency	Call sign	Branding	Format	Owner	Notes
88.1 FM	CKDU-FM	CKDU 88.1 FM	campus radio	CKDU-FM Society	Associated with Dalhousie University
89.9 FM	CHNS-FM	89.9 The Wave	classic hits	Maritime Broadcasting System	
90.5 FM	CBHA-FM	CBC Radio One	public news/talk	Canadian Broadcasting Corporation	
91.5 FM	CBAX-FM	Ici Musique	public music	Canadian Broadcasting Corporation	French
92.3 FM	CBAF-FM-5	Ici Radio-Canada Première	public news/talk	Canadian Broadcasting Corporation	French
92.9 FM	CFLT-FM	Jack 92.9	adult hits	Rogers Communications	
93.9 FM	CJLU-FM	Harvesters FM	Christian	International Harvesters for Christ Evangelistic Association	
95.7 FM	CJNI-FM	City News 95.7	news/talk/sports	Rogers Communications	Signed off the air permanently July 7, 2026.
96.5 FM	CKUL-FM	96.5 The Breeze	adult contemporary	Stingray Group	
98.5 FM	CKRH-FM	Radio Halifax Métro	community radio	Coopérative Radio-Halifax-Métro limitée	French
99.1 FM	CHHU-FM		multicultural	Radio Moyen-Orient	
99.3 FM	CHSB-FM	Hilltop FM	Christian	Bedford Baptist Church	
100.1 FM	CIOO-FM	Move 100	hot adult contemporary	Bell Media Radio	
101.3 FM	CJCH-FM	101.3 Virgin Radio	contemporary hit radio	Bell Media Radio	
101.9 FM	CHFX-FM	FX101.9	country music	Maritime Broadcasting System	
102.7 FM	CBH-FM	CBC Music	adult music format with a variety of genres	Canadian Broadcasting Corporation	
103.5 FM	CKHZ-FM	Hot Country 103.5	country music	Acadia Broadcasting	
104.3 FM	CFRQ-FM	Q104	active rock	Stingray Group	
105.1 FM	CKHY-FM	Surge 105	modern rock	Acadia Broadcasting	
105.9 FM	CFEP-FM	Seaside FM	community radio	Seaside Broadcasting	licensed to Eastern Passage
106.9 FM	CHCN-FM		community radio	Cole Harbour Community Radio Society	licensed to Cole Harbour

=== Internet radio stations ===
Frequency	Branding	Format	owner	Notes
Internet only	International Voice of Deliverance Radio	Evangelical	Pastor Sean Bonitto	https://www.internationaldeliveranceministries.org/ivd-radio

== Television ==
=== Locally produced shows ===
Several television shows are created in Halifax including the CBC news satire show This Hour Has 22 Minutes, the children's program Theodore Tugboat and the mockumentary show Trailer Park Boys.

=== Television stations ===
Several television stations operate in HRM; however, due to the large size of the municipality they have to be retransmitted:

OTA virtual channel (PSIP)	OTA channel	Eastlink Cable	Bell Aliant FibreOP TV	Call Sign	Network	Notes
3.1	32 (UHF)	11	3	CBHT-DT	CBC Television	also channel 11 in Sheet Harbour
5.1	15 (UHF)	9	6	CJCH-DT	CTV	also channel 2 in Sheet Harbour
8.1	8 (VHF)	6	4	CIHF-DT	Global	
–	–	7	5	CTV 2 Atlantic	CTV 2	
–	–	95; 630	401	Legislative Television	Legislative Television Broadcast and Recording Services	Proceedings from the Nova Scotia House of Assembly
–	–	10	–	–	EastLink TV	Community channel for EastLink Cable subscribers
–	–	13	–	–	EastLink TV	Real estate listings channel for EastLink Cable subscribers
–	–	–	1	–	TV1	Community channel for Bell Aliant FibreOP TV subscribers

The CTV and Global stations broadcast to the entire region of The Maritimes. CTV 2 Atlantic broadcasts to all of Atlantic Canada. HRM was formerly served by CBHFT-TV, a rebroadcaster of the Ici Radio-Canada Télé station CBAFT-DT in Moncton, but the transmitter was shut down in 2012 due to budget cuts.

Several specialty digital television channel licenses have also been developed in HRM in recent years by Salter Street Films. Cable services are provided by Eastlink. IPTV provided by Bell Aliant.

== Print ==
=== Newspapers ===
The Chronicle Herald is a daily broadsheet and the provincial newspaper of Nova Scotia with news bureaus across the province. The paper is independently owned, and usually has a moderate conservative editorial policy. It is considered Nova Scotia's newspaper of record.

StarMetro Halifax was the city's other daily paper, which was launched as a free handout by Transcontinental Media on February 14, 2008. It replaced The Daily News, a daily tabloid paper, focusing primarily on Halifax, which published from 1974 until February 11, 2008. Transcontinental had purchased The Daily News in 2002, and closed the publication saying the paper operated at a loss.

The Coast is a free "alternative weekly" focused primarily on HRM's urban core, especially the Halifax Peninsula. The independently owned paper is known for its generally left leaning or progressive editorial policy.

The Trident Newspaper is a bi-weekly publication of Maritime Forces Atlantic and Canadian Forces Base Halifax that focuses on the military community of the Halifax area.

There are also several student newspapers in the city's universities and colleges: The Sentinel at Mount Saint Vincent University, the Gazette at Dalhousie University, and The Journal at St. Mary's University. The Transcript, The Signal, and the Halifax Commoner are published by students attending the award-winning journalism program at the University of King's College.

=== Magazines ===
Magazines published in Halifax include the locally themed Unravel Halifax, Faces Magazine, East Coast Living, Our Children] and Saltscapes. Halifax's Buddhist community publishes Buddhadharma and Lion's Roar (formerly the Shambhala Sun).

A Maritimes gossip tabloid Frank Magazine was established in Halifax and subsequently expanded into central Canada; it has since retracted to focusing on the Maritimes. It ceased production in 2022.

Wayves, an LGBT outlet, produced print magazines from 1983 to 2012, and now publishes solely online. YGA was a magazine published for LGBT youth.

== Online ==
In addition to the significant online presence of all traditional Halifax news outlets, the city is home to several online newspapers.

AllNovaScotia is a daily news website founded by David Bentley with a focus on business and political news throughout the province. It has a reputation for investigative journalism and had a newsroom staff of 18 in February 2016. The subscription-based service operates behind a paywall and has nearly 10,000 subscribers. It is popular among those in the business community and in government.

The Halifax Examiner is another subscription-supported local news website run by investigative journalist Tim Bousquet, former news editor of The Coast. The outlet is a self-described "independent, adversarial news site devoted to holding the powerful accountable".

Haligonia.ca is a free website with a more blog-like format that focuses on light local news.

The Halifax Media Co-op was founded in February 2009. It published "grassroots news" that often aimed to amplify underrepresented voices. The outlet went on "indefinite hiatus" from June 2016 due to a limited budget and the fact that some of their core volunteers had moved on to other work.

Halifax ReTales is a free website that focuses on retail-related news in the Halifax Metro region. The website publishes weekly, and each "Weekly Recap" is split into 6 segments. These segments include "Coming" (includes retail businesses coming to the Halifax region), "Open" (includes recently open retail businesses to the Halifax region), "Closing" (includes retail businesses closing in the Halifax region), "Closed" (includes recently closed retail businesses in the Halifax region), "Updates" (includes updates to retail businesses coming/leaving the Halifax region) and "HodgePodge". The "HodgePodge" segment is written at the end of the weekly newsletter and usually features stories or reviews of retail businesses.
