= Halifax Examiner =

Canadian news website

- Type: Online newspaper
- Publisher: Tim Bousquet
- Founded: May 18, 2014; 12 years ago
- City: Halifax, Nova Scotia
- Website: www.halifaxexaminer.ca

The Halifax Examiner is an online newspaper based in Halifax, Nova Scotia. It was founded in 2014 by Tim Bousquet, former news editor of The Coast alternative weekly paper. Bousquet, known for covering local politics and undertaking long-term investigations and media analysis, describes the outlet as an "independent, adversarial news site devoted to holding the powerful accountable".

The website is supported by subscribers. Most daily stories are free, while more in-depth stories and investigative pieces are behind a paywall. A standard subscription costs $12 per month. The website is ad-free, as Bousquet has expressed an aversion to advertising.

The investigative journalist Joan Baxter is a regular contributor to the Halifax Examiner.

== See also ==
- AllNovaScotia
- Local Xpress
- Media in Halifax, Nova Scotia
