= Atlantic Book Award for Scholarly Writing =

Canadian literary award

The Atlantic Book Award for Scholarly Writing is a Canadian literary award administered by the Atlantic Book Awards & Festival for the best work of scholarly writing published in the previous year by a writer from the Atlantic provinces. The award was established in 2013, sponsored by Marquis Imprimeur, and is worth CA$1,000. The award was last presented in 2023.

== Winners and nominees ==
Year	Writer	Title	Result	Ref.
2013	Susan Dodd	The Ocean Ranger	Winner	
2013	Shannon Ryan	A History of Newfoundland in the North Atlantic to 1818	Finalist	
2013	Trudy Sable and Bernie Francis	The Language of This Land, Mi'kma'ki	Finalist	
2014	Ruth Holmes Whitehead	Black Loyalists	Winner	
2014	Jonathan Fowler and Earle Lockerby	Jeremiah Bancroft at Fort Beauséjour and Grand-Pré	Finalist	
2014	David Bell	Loyalist Rebellion in New Brunswick	Finalist	
2015	Richard Starr	The Tumultuous and Troubled History of a Great Canadian Idea	Winner	
2015	Katherine Dewar	Those Splendid Girls	Finalist	
2015	Adrian Tanner	Bringing Home Animals	Finalist	
2016	Geoffrey McCormack and Thom Workman	The Servant State	Winner	
2016	Brian Cuthbertson	Stubborn Resistance	Finalist	
2016	Michael Newton	Seanchaidh na Coille / Memory Keeper of the Forest	Finalist	
2017	Alex Marland	Brand Command	Winner	
2017	Greg Marquis	The Vigilant Eye	Finalist	
2017	Erin Wunker	Notes from a Feminist Killjoy	Finalist	
2018	Joan Baxter	The Mill	Winner	
2018	Rachel Bryant	The Homing Place	Finalist	
2018	Karolyn Smardz Frost	Steal Away Home	Finalist	
2019	Ingrid R. G. Waldron	There's Something in the Water	Winner	
2019	Lars Osberg	The Age of Increasing Inequality	Finalist	
2019	Suzanne Stewart	The Tides of Time	Finalist	
2020	L. Jane McMillan	Truth and Conviction	Winner	
2020	Rie Croll	Shaped by Silence	Finalist	
2020	Linden MacIntyre	The Wake	Finalist	
2021	Andrea Procter	A Long Journey	Winner	
2021	Alan MacEachern	The Miramichi Fire	Finalist	
2021	Margaret Conrad	At the Ocean's Edge	Finalist	
2022	Ardath Whynacht	Insurgent Love	Winner	
2022	George Elliott Clarke	Where Beauty Survived	Finalist	
2022	Matthew W. Betts and M. Gabriel Hrynick	The Archaeology of the Atlantic Northeast	Finalist	
2023	Carol Lynne D'Arcangelis	The Solidarity Encounter	Winner	
2023	Mark David Turner	Inuit TakugatsaliuKatiget / On Inuit Cinema	Finalist	
2023	Elizabeth Yeoman	Exactly What I Said	Finalist	
