= Frank (magazine) =

Canadian satirical magazine

Frank is a satirical magazine founded in 1987 in Halifax, Nova Scotia.

A separate publication in Ottawa, Ontario, of the same name was published from 1989 to 2004, revived from 2005 to 2008 and began publication again in 2013. This publication was a legally separate entity, although it spawned from the Halifax publication.

Both editions came under the same ownership in March 2023. The Ottawa edition is now online-only, while the Halifax edition has both a print and online presence.

== Halifax edition ==
The idea for Frank can be traced to Halifax-area newspaper publisher David Bentley. Using money he received from the sale of The Daily News, Bentley, along with Lyndon Watkins and Dulcie Conrad, started a bi-weekly "gossip rag" or "scandal magazine" which they gave the name Frank.

The first issue was published in November 1987 and focused on gossip about the private lives of the rich, famous and politically connected in the Maritimes. It was designed to sell the sensational news coverage that mainstream press in the Maritimes was averse to covering and was somewhat of an extension to Bentley's vision for The Daily News during the 1970s and early 1980s.

Bentley followed a successful formula with Frank by feeding the need for sensational gossip among the rich and powerful as well as the average citizen. The publication found its niche in a Canadian media which was traditionally reluctant to pry into the personal lives of politicians and other notables, often covering material found nowhere else. All articles in Frank are published anonymously although some of its contributors have at times been revealed to be reporters working for more mainstream media outlets.

Unusually, the magazine had no real advertising and operated solely from its subscriptions, although it does contain a great deal of satirical "advertising".

Bentley expanded the Frank franchise to include an Ottawa edition in 1989 with the help of former Canadian Press reporter Michael Bate, while continuing with his publication of the Halifax edition. The Halifax edition of Frank gained considerable coverage after scooping local and national media to reveal the charges of sexual assault against former Premier of Nova Scotia and Trudeau-era cabinet minister Gerald Regan. Regan was subsequently acquitted. Local targets of the magazines satire and gossip have frequently included members of the billionaire Sobey, Irving and McCain families, as well as prominent local media personalities and politicians in all three provinces.

Dulcie Conrad sold her share of the Halifax edition of Frank in the mid-1990s to Bentley and Watkins. In September 2000, Bentley and Watkins sold an equity stake in the Maritime edition of Frank to one of the magazine's reporters, Clifford Boutilier.

From 2002 to 2004, David Bentley's daughter Caroline Wood was the editor/publisher of the Maritime edition.

In 2004, Wood handed control of the magazine to John Williams, previously a Frank staff reporter. No money changed hands.

Williams sold Frank Magazine to Cape Breton-born businessman Douglas Rudderham for an undisclosed sum in November 2010, in order to concentrate efforts on his gay publication, Gaze Magazine. Based in Montreal, Rudderham is also the president and CEO of Pharmacy Wholesale Services, primarily a supplier of diabetic supplies.

In June 2011 conventional media outlets such as CBC and The Chronicle Herald reported that the publication's newsroom underwent a massive shakeup when four of its five reporters left, three having been fired by managing editor Andrew Douglas and one resigning. CBC reported that the first reporter to be fired, Mairin Prentiss, occurred after she had questioned a recent column on sexism. The firing of Prentiss apparently triggered Walsh's resignation, which was followed by terminations for Neal Ozano and Jacob Boon who allegedly acted insubordinately.

In July 2025, Frank was, under Nova Scotia's Intimate Images and Cyber-protection Act, ordered to take down an article that included a topless photo of a woman who said the magazine published it without her consent. Frank complied with the order. The woman subsequently launched legal action against the magazine.

== Ottawa edition ==
Bentley's expansion of the Frank franchise from its Halifax base to include an Ottawa edition in 1989, with the help of Michael Bate, proved extremely successful during its first decade of publication, as the edition quickly outsold its Maritime cousin by feeding off the void of gossip news among mainstream media in the nation's capital.

Bate subsequently bought out Bentley and his other partners to make the Ottawa edition of Frank independent of its Halifax roots, although both magazines maintained similar coverage and continued much as before.

Bate did make several changes including adding a "Remedial Media" section which printed gossip tidbits on the internal politics of Canadian media outlets. Michael Coren, whose humour column "Aesthete's Diary" was retitled "Michael Coren's Diary" after he revealed his true identity, was one of the few contributors ever to use his real name in the magazine.

The final page of the Ottawa edition of Frank also featured a humour column, usually satirizing the point of view of a real Canadian political figure such as Sheila Copps or Preston Manning. In later years, the back page column was titled "Dick Little's Canadian Beef". Little was not a real figure, but a curmudgeonly caricature holding mostly conservative views meant to satirize a typical "angry Canadian."

The Ottawa edition of Frank received notoriety in 1991 when the magazine ran a satirical advertisement for a contest inviting young Tories to "deflower Caroline Mulroney." Mulroney's father, then-Prime Minister Brian Mulroney, was upset and threatened to "take a gun and go down there and do serious damage to these people" on television. Bate would call the spoof "clumsy", and state that it was intended to target Brian, rather than Caroline, though not regretting the incident as a whole.

The Ottawa edition of Frank broke a number of notable stories, including being the first to publish the tale of Mel Lastman's wife's shoplifting arrest and was the only Canadian publication to cover the divorce trial of cabinet minister Paul Dick. Other Frank targets included serial killer Karla Homolka, CBC Radio host Peter Gzowski, and comedian Dan Aykroyd. Frank continuously followed the marriages of personalities, such as CBC Television news anchor Peter Mansbridge with fellow journalist Wendy Mesley then with actress Cynthia Dale, and Bank of Montreal CEO Matthew Barrett with pin-up model Anne Marie Sten. The magazine was also known for outing public figures as gay, lesbian or bisexual; most notably, a 1996 cover story on musician Ashley MacIsaac's sexuality spurred MacIsaac to come out.

Other regular features of the magazine included parody movie or television advertisements and a two-page fumetti comic which used television screenshots, usually of newscasts, to mock journalists and politicians through the use of satirical dialogue balloons.

Many of those who had been written about or "Franked," threatened lawsuits, and many issues toward the end of Michael Bate's ownership contained printed apologies as a means to warding off the expense of lawyers' fees. The magazine bit the bullet on only two legal battles—one to a Quebec judge and one to Mike Duffy, a Canadian television journalist whom the magazine deemed a "fat-faced liar" and had called "Mike Puffy" (in reference to his physical appearance). Although the magazine settled on the latter case, the legal expenses launched the Ottawa edition into a downward financial spiral.

In 2002 Bate made it known that he was looking for a buyer. A bid was soon on offer by Theo Caldwell, who had no publishing background and was apparently returning to Canada after a bid to become a Hollywood actor. Caldwell offered $150,000 for the company, and claimed to be interested in making Frank a "kinder, gentler" magazine. Bate rebuffed the offer due to his rejection of Caldwell's vision for the publication.

The next year, another offer was made by a group of Toronto investors led by Fabrice Taylor, former business reporter for The Globe and Mail. After a reportedly bizarre meeting at Bate's house, he sold the magazine to Taylor's group. Taylor moved the magazine to Toronto and relaunched it in late 2003 — however, circulation dropped dramatically, and lingering financial difficulties resulting from libel lawsuits ended with the final issue on December 3, 2004. The Halifax edition was unaffected and continued publishing.

The Ottawa edition of Frank was resurrected after Bate reportedly reacquired the property from Taylor, returning the satire magazine to the nation's capital. The new ownership created an online magazine using the name efrank.ca, with the first issue publishing on September 27, 2005. Several features from the original printed version of the Ottawa edition were retained and a full print version returned to newsstands in late November 2005 (issues are numbered as "Volume 2"). With the print version, subscription-by-mail again became available.

An announcement was sent on October 28, 2008 that the print and web versions of the publication were ceasing publication.

In May 2013, Bate announced an intention to revive Frank as an online publication in September or October 2013. Frank relaunched as a digital publication on October 1 with a metered paywall, in a blog format described as similar to Andrew Sullivan’s The Dish, with a subscription price between $10–15 per month. It came out in December 2013 and biweekly after that in both digital and print editions.

== See also ==
- Media in Canada
