= AllNovaScotia =

Online newspaper

allNovaScotia
- Type: Online newspaper
- Founder: David Bentley
- Founded: March 2001; 24 years ago
- City: Halifax, Nova Scotia
- Website: www.allnovascotia.com

allNovaScotia is an online newspaper based in Halifax, Nova Scotia, Canada.

== History ==
Founded in March 2001 by David Bentley and his daughter Caroline Wood, the subscription news service focuses on business and political news throughout the province.

All articles are protected by a hard paywall, which prevents non-subscribers from viewing any content.

As of 2013, the newspaper claimed to have over 7,000 subscribers and employed 15 paid journalists.

The company launched its sister-publication allNewfoundlandLabrador in St. John's, Newfoundland and Labrador in 2016.

== See also ==
- Halifax Examiner
- Local Xpress
- Media in Halifax, Nova Scotia
