= Ardath Whynacht =

Canadian feminist writer

Ardath Whynacht is a Canadian feminist writer and researcher whose book Insurgent Love won the Atlantic Book Award for Scholarly Writing in 2022. She is an associate professor of sociology at Mount Allison University.

== Education and career ==
Whynacht holds a Bachelor of Arts/Bachelor of Science (Combined Honours) from the University of King's College, a Master of Arts from Dalhousie University, and a PhD from Concordia University. She is an associate professor of sociology at Mount Allison University, where she also serves as the director of the health studies program. Her research is focused on community response to sexual assault and family violence, particularly involving applications of transformative justice.

In 2022, Whynacht's book Insurgent Love: Abolition and Domestic Homicide won the Atlantic Book Award for Scholarly Writing.

== Publications ==
- Whynacht, Ardath (2021). Insurgent Love: Abolition and Domestic Homicide. Fernwood Publishing. ISBN 978-1-7736-3483-8.
