= Joan Baxter =

Canadian writer and journalist

Joan Baxter is a Canadian writer and journalist based in Nova Scotia. Baxter lived and worked in Africa between 1982 and 2003, and returned to Canada permanently in 2016, where she writes for the Halifax Examiner. She won the Evelyn Richardson Award for Non-Fiction in 2001 for her book A Serious Pair of Shoes: An African Journal, and in 2018 she won the Atlantic Book Award for Scholarly Writing for The Mill: Fifty Years of Pulp and Protest.

== Career ==
=== Journalism ===
Baxter's career in journalism was inspired by her travels in Guatemala during the Guatemalan Civil War, where she was conducting primatology research on the social life of spider monkeys [Ateles geoffreyi] for her Masters degree in Anthropology, which she earned in 1979 from the University of Alberta, where she was granted an Honours MA degree in 1978. After returning to Canada from Central America, she earned a Bachelor of Journalism with Distinction from the University of King's College in Halifax in 1982. Baxter lived in Burkina Faso while the country was under the rule of Thomas Sankara, during which she reported for the BBC World Service; she left the country in 1987 after Sankara was assassinated. She lived and worked in seven African countries between 1982 and 2003, and continued to travel to Africa before returning to Canada permanently in 2016.

From 1997 until 2003, she was the Mali correspondence for the BBC World Service, and reported for several other media outlets, including the Associated Press and the Canadian Broadcasting Corporation (CBC).

From 1993 until 1996, Baxter worked as a senior science writer with the International Centre for Agroforestry (ICRAF), based in Nairobi, Kenya.

Baxter is an independent reporter at the Halifax Examiner, and conducts investigative journalism on the mining industry.

=== Books ===
Baxter's first book, Graveyard for Dreamers: One Woman's Odyssey in Africa, was published in 1994 by Pottersfield Press. The book describes her experiences living in West Africa, and provides commentary on the failed revolution in Burkina Faso, tribal conflicts in Ghana, and other regional conflicts.

Her next book, A Serious Pair of Shoes: An African Journal was published in 2000. The book was the winner of the Evelyn Richardson Award for Non-Fiction at the 2001 Atlantic Book Awards.

In 2017, Baxter released The Mill: Fifty Years of Pulp and Protest, which covers the Northern Pulp mill in Pictou. The information in the book was documented over 50 years and supported by more than 800 references. While writing the book, Baxter requested interviews with Northern Pulp officials, the former Premier of Nova Scotia John Hamm, who chairs the board of Northern Pulp, and Premier Stephen McNeil. All of her interview requests were refused or left unanswered. Workers at Northern Pulp were critical of the book for "depicting their workplace in such negative unbalanced fashion". The company's communications director referred to it as "a non-factual rhetoric filled account of the mill" and threatened the bookstore Coles with a boycott if they allowed a planned book signing event in New Glasgow to take place. The event was subsequently cancelled. Baxter claimed in response that Northern Pulp was "so used to bullying to get their way over there that they don't even realize that it's unacceptable". At the 2018 Atlantic Book Awards, The Mill won the Atlantic Book Award for Scholarly Writing.

== Publications ==
- Baxter, Joan (1994). Graveyard for Dreamers: One Woman's Odyssey in Africa. Lawrencetown Beach, NS: Pottersfield Press. ISBN 978-0-9190-0188-6. OCLC 30976908.
- — (1996). Strangers Are Like Children: Stories of Africa. Lawrencetown Beach, NS: Pottersfield Press. ISBN 978-0-9190-0198-5. OCLC 35342528.
- — (2000). A Serious Pair of Shoes: An African Journal. Lawrencetown Beach, NS: Pottersfield Press. ISBN 978-1-8959-0030-9. OCLC 47056533.
- — (2008). Dust from our Eyes: An Unblinkered Look at Africa. Hamilton, ON: Wolsak and Wynn. ISBN 978-1-8949-8730-1. OCLC 229035864.
- — (2017). The Mill: Fifty Years of Pulp and Protest. Foreword by May, Elizabeth. Lawrencetown Beach, NS: Pottersfield Press. ISBN 978-1-9882-8617-4. OCLC 988154806.
- — (2017). Seven Grains of Paradise: A Culinary Journey in Africa. Lawrencetown Beach, NS: Pottersfield Press. ISBN 978-1-9882-8602-0. OCLC 962129429.
- — (2021). The Hermit of Gully Lake: The Life and Times of Willard Kitchener MacDonald. Lawrencetown Beach, NS: Pottersfield Press. ISBN 978-1-9897-2550-4. OCLC 1232083826.
