= Katherine Dewar =

Canadian historian (1943–2026)

- Born: Katherine Elizabeth Dewar; 13 December 1943; Summerside, Prince Edward Island
- Died: 6 March 2026 (aged 82); Charlottetown, Prince Edward Island
- Occupations: Nurse; historian

Katherine Elizabeth Dewar (13 November 1943 – 6 March 2026) was a Canadian nurse and historian from Prince Edward Island whose work focused on the role of women in the World Wars.

== Biography ==
Katherine Dewar was born on 13 November 1943 in Summerside, Prince Edward Island, to parents Robert and Mae Dewar. She graduated from the Summerside School of Nursing in 1971, following which she earned a Bachelor of Arts in sociology from the University of Prince Edward Island in 1979 and a Master of Adult Education from St. Francis Xavier University in 1989. She had a long career in nursing, teaching for over two decades at the PEI School of Nursing and remaining active in the Canadian Nurses Association.

Following her retirement from nursing, Dewar turned her attention to local history, with a focus on the role of women in the World Wars. She wrote three books on the subject; her 2014 book Those Splendid Girls: The Heroic Service of Prince Edward Island Nurses in the Great War was shortlisted for the Atlantic Book Award for Scholarly Writing in 2015, and her 2021 book We'll Meet Again: Prince Edward Island Women of the Second World War was named Publication of the Year by the PEI Museum and Heritage Foundation.

In 2017, Dewar was one of five nurses from Prince Edward Island honoured by the Canadian Nurses Association during the 150th anniversary of Confederation. She was presented with the Frances O. Perry Good Neighbour of the Year Award by the City of Summerside in 2020.

Dewar died on 6 March 2026 at the Queen Elizabeth Hospital in Charlottetown, at the age of 82.

== Publications ==
- Wright, Wayne; Dewar, Katherine (2001). This Caring Place: The History of Prince County Hospital and School of Nursing. Prince County Hospital Foundation. ISBN 978-0-9688-6670-2.
- Dewar, Katherine (2014). Those Splendid Girls: The Heroic Service of Prince Edward Island Nurses in the Great War. Charlottetown: Island Studies Press. ISBN 978-0-9190-1380-3.
- — (2018). Called to Serve: Georgina Pope, Canadian Military Nursing Heroine. Charlottetown: Island Studies Press. ISBN 978-1-9886-9203-6.
- — (2021). We'll Meet Again: Prince Edward Island Women of the Second World War. Charlottetown: Island Studies Press. ISBN 978-1-9886-9249-4.
