= Local Xpress =

Canadian online newspaper

- Type: Online newspaper
- Publisher: Halifax Typographical Union
- Founded: January 30, 2016
- Ceased publication: August 10, 2017
- City: Halifax, Nova Scotia

Local Xpress was an online newspaper based in Halifax, Nova Scotia, Canada. It was founded in 2016 by 57 members of the Halifax Typographical Union's newsroom unit while on strike from The Chronicle Herald, the city's daily newspaper. The Herald continued to publish during the strike using strikebreakers writing anonymously.

The strike began on 23 January 2016. Local Xpress was launched a week later, initially with a blog-like interface. The striking writers worked on the Local Xpress on a volunteer basis. In May 2016, as the strike dragged on, the website was revamped as a full-service online newspaper in partnership with Village Media, an Ontario digital media company. It aimed to compete with the Herald, expanding to offer national and international news, event listings, columnists, weather, and other features.

The strikers stated that if the strike was resolved, Local Xpress would be shut down. In a round of bargaining in October 2016, Herald management demanded that the strikers not only close the Local Xpress, but also hand over all content produced during the strike, as well as the Local Xpress URL, to the Herald.

The parties reached a deal in August 2017 and the website was subsequently closed, although Village Media announced it would relaunch a similarly formatted community news website called HalifaxToday.

== See also ==
- Media in Halifax, Nova Scotia
