= Lars Osberg =

Canadian economist

Academic background
- Education: Yale University

Academic work
- Discipline: Economic development
- Institutions: Dalhousie University (Halifax, Nova Scotia, Canada
- Awards: Doug Purvis Memorial Prize (2019)
- Website: Information at IDEAS / RePEc

Lars Osberg (PhD. Yale) has been a member of the Economics Department at Dalhousie University (Halifax, Nova Scotia, Canada) since 1977. He also worked for a brief period at the University of Western Ontario. He is well known internationally for his contributions in the field of economics. His major research interests are the measurement and determinants of inequality, social exclusion and poverty, measurement of economic well-being, leisure co-ordination and economic well-being, time use and economic development, economic insecurity.

== Books ==
- Not Fair: Inequality of Opportunity in Canada University of Toronto Press, 2025, 257 pages
- The Scandalous Rise of Inequality in Canada James Lorimer Publishers, Toronto, 2024, 286 pages
- The Age of Increasing Inequality James Lorimer Publishers, Toronto – 2018
- The Economic Implications of Social Cohesion (edited) University of Toronto Press, Toronto, 2003, 249 pages
- Principles of Microeconomics: Fourth Edition – 2012 McGraw-Hill Ryerson, Toronto - joint with Frank/Bernanke/Cross/MacLean
- Principles of Macroeconomics: Fourth Edition – 2012 McGraw-Hill Ryerson, Toronto - joint with Frank/Bernanke/Cross/MacLean
- Hard Money, Hard Times (edited with P. Fortin) James Lorimer Publishers, Toronto, Ontario, 1998, 202 pages.
- The Unemployment Crisis: All for Naught (edited with B. MacLean) McGill/Queen's University Press (1996) 251 pages.
- Unnecessary Debts, (edited with P. Fortin), (ed.), James Lorimer Publishers, Toronto, Ontario, 1996, 200 pages.
- Vanishing Jobs: Canada's Changing Workplaces (with F. Wien and J. Grude), James Lorimer Publishers, Toronto, Ontario (1995) 215 pages.
- A Social Charter for Canada (edited with S. Phipps) C.D. Howe Institute, Toronto, Ontario, February (1992).
- Economic Inequality and Poverty: International Perspectives (editor) M.E. Sharpe Ltd. Armonk, New York (1991), 257 pages.
- The Information Economy: the Implications of Unbalanced Growth (with W. Baumol & E.N. Wolff) Institute for Research on Public Policy (1989), 114 pages.
- Economic Inequality in the United States, M.E. Sharpe Ltd., Armonk, New York (1984), 288 pages.
- Economic Inequality in Canada, Butterworth Publishing Co., Toronto, Ontario (1981), 236 pages.

== Refereed journal articles ==
- Bechert, Insa; Osberg, Lars (2023). "A few people make all the difference – an international comparison of 'fair' pay differentials". International Journal of Sociology. 53 (6): 421–447. doi:10.1080/00207659.2023.2274713.
- Watson, Barry; Law, Stephen; Osberg, Lars (2022). "Are Populists Insecure About Themselves or About Their Country? Political Attitudes and Economic Perceptions". Social Indicators Research. 159 (2): 667–705. doi:10.1007/s11205-021-02767-8. PMC 8332002. PMID 34366546.
- Watson, Barry; Daley, Angela; Rohde, Nicholas; Osberg, Lars (2020). "Blown off-course? Weight gain among the economically insecure during the great recession". Journal of Economic Psychology. 80 102289. doi:10.1016/j.joep.2020.102289. hdl:10072/402291.
- Rohde, Nicholas; Tang, Kam Ki; d'Ambrosio, Conchita; Osberg, Lars; Rao, Prasada (2020). "Welfare-based income insecurity in the us and germany: Evidence from harmonized panel data". Journal of Economic Behavior & Organization. 176: 226–243. doi:10.1016/j.jebo.2020.04.023. hdl:10072/399129.
- Kong, Nancy; Osberg, Lars; Zhou, Weina (2019). "The shattered 'Iron Rice Bowl': Intergenerational effects of Chinese State-Owned Enterprise reform". Journal of Health Economics. 67 102220. doi:10.1016/j.jhealeco.2019.06.007. PMID 31330471.
- Chen, Kelly; Osberg, Lars; Phipps, Shelley (2019). "Unequal opportunities and public policy: The impact of parental disability benefits on child postsecondary attendance". Canadian Journal of Economics/Revue Canadienne d'Économique. 52 (4): 1401–1432. doi:10.1111/caje.12408.
- Watson, Barry; Osberg, Lars (2019). "Can positive income anticipations reverse the mental health impacts of negative income anxieties?". Economics & Human Biology. 35: 107–122. doi:10.1016/j.ehb.2019.05.003. PMID 31319364.
- Watson, Barry; Osberg, Lars (2018). "Job insecurity and mental health in Canada". Applied Economics. 50 (38): 4137–4152. doi:10.1080/00036846.2018.1441516.
- Osberg, Lars (2017). "On the Limitations of Some Current Usages of the Gini Index". Review of Income and Wealth. 63 (3): 574–584. doi:10.1111/roiw.12256.
- Chen, Kelly; Osberg, Lars; Phipps, Shelley (2019). "Unequal opportunities and public policy: The impact of parental disability benefits on child postsecondary attendance". Canadian Journal of Economics/Revue Canadienne d'Économique. 52 (4): 1401–1432. doi:10.1111/caje.12408.
- Watson, Barry; Osberg, Lars (2017). "Healing and/Or breaking? The mental health implications of repeated economic insecurity". Social Science & Medicine. 188: 119–127. doi:10.1016/j.socscimed.2017.06.042. PMID 28750246.
- Rohde, Nicholas; Tang, Kam Ki; Osberg, Lars; Rao, D.S. Prasada (2017). "Is it vulnerability or economic insecurity that matters for health?". Journal of Economic Behavior & Organization. 134: 307–319. doi:10.1016/j.jebo.2016.12.010. hdl:10072/340364.
- Rohde, Nicholas; Tang, KK; Osberg, Lars (2017). "The self-reinforcing dynamics of economic insecurity and obesity". Applied Economics. 49 (17): 1668–1678. doi:10.1080/00036846.2016.1223826.
- MacDonald, Bonnie-Jeanne; Osberg, Lars; Moore, Kevin D. (2016). "How Accurately Does 70% Final Employment Earnings Replacement Measure Retirement Income (In)Adequacy? Introducing the Living Standards Replacement Rate (LSRR)". Astin Bulletin. 46 (3): 627–676. doi:10.1017/asb.2016.20.
- Osberg, Lars (2017). "On the Limitations of Some Current Usages of the Gini Index". Review of Income and Wealth. 63 (3): 574–584. doi:10.1111/roiw.12256.
- Watson, Barry; Osberg, Lars; Phipps, Shelley (2016). "Economic Insecurity and the Weight Gain of Canadian Adults: A Natural Experiment Approach". Canadian Public Policy. 42 (2): 115–131. doi:10.3138/cpp.2015-064.
- Rohde, Nicholas; Tang, K.K.; Osberg, Lars; Rao, Prasada (2016). "The effect of economic insecurity on mental health: Recent evidence from Australian panel data". Social Science & Medicine. 151: 250–258. doi:10.1016/j.socscimed.2015.12.014. hdl:10072/142628. PMID 26826683.
- "Prevalence, Frequency and Persistence of Being Bullied for Canadian Adolescents: A Longitudinal Analysis" with Lihui Zhang and Shelley Phipps revise and resubmit Social Science Journal
- Chen, Kelly; Osberg, Lars; Phipps, Shelley (2015). "Inter-generational effects of disability benefits: Evidence from Canadian social assistance programs". Journal of Population Economics. 28 (4): 873–910. doi:10.1007/s00148-015-0557-9.
- Osberg, Lars (2015). "The Hunger of Old Women in Rural Tanzania: Can Subjective Data Improve Poverty Measurement?". Review of Income and Wealth. 61 (4): 723–738. doi:10.1111/roiw.12128.
- Rohde, Nicholas; Tang, Kam Ki; Osberg, Lars; Rao, D.S. Prasada (2015). "Economic Insecurity in Australia: Who is Feeling the Pinch and How?". Economic Record. 91 (292): 1–15. doi:10.1111/1475-4932.12141.
- MacDonald, Bonnie-Jeanne; Osberg, Lars (2014). "Canadian Retirement Incomes: How Much do Financial Market Returns Matter?". Canadian Public Policy. 40 (4): 315–338. doi:10.3138/cpp.2013-009.
- "Measuring Economic Insecurity in Rich and Poor Nations" (with Andrew Sharpe) Review of Income and Wealth Vol. 60, pp. S53-S76, May, 2014
- "Instability Implications of Increasing Inequality: Evidence from North America" Economic Modelling Volume 35, September 2013, Pages 918–930
- "Demand or Supply for Schooling in Rural India?" (with Sripad Motiram) International Journal of Time Use Research volume 9 number 1 November 2012
- "Gender Inequalities in Tasks and Instruction Opportunities within Indian Families" with Sripad Motiram Feminist Economics – Vol. 16(3), July 2010, 141–167
- "Social Capital and Basic Goods: The Cautionary Tale of Drinking Water in India" with Sripad Motiram –, Economic Development and Cultural Change October 2010, Vol. 59, No. 1: pp. 63–94
- "Keeping in Touch: A Benefit of Public Holidays" with Joachim Merz, International Journal of Time Use Research September 2009, vol. 6 no. 1, pp. 130–66.
- "The Growth of Poor Children in China 1991-2000: Why Food Subsidies May Matter" with Jiaping Shao and Kuan Xu, Health Economics, April 2009; Vol. 18 Suppl 1:S89-108.
- "How Should We Measure Poverty in a Changing World? Methodological Issues and Chinese Case Study" (with Kuan Xu) Review of Development Economics, 12(2), 419-441, 2008.
- "'Fair' Inequality? Attitudes to Pay Differentials: The United States in Comparative Perspective" (with Tim Smeeding) American Sociological Review, Vol. 71 (450-473) June 2006.
- "The Double-Edged Sword of Trade" (with Teresa Cyrus and Lynn Lethbridge) Eastern Economic Journal, Vol. 33, No. 2, Spring 2007, pp. 277–293.
- "Pulling Apart–The Growing Gulfs in Canadian Society" Policy Options, April–May 2006.
- "Poverty and the Extent of Child Obesity in Canada, Norway and the United States" (with Shelley A. Phipps, Peter S. Burton, and Lynn N. Lethbridge) Obesity Reviews, January 2006, Vol. 7, pp. 5–12.
- "Work and Well-being in an Aging Society" Canadian Public Policy 31(4) December 2005, p. 413-420.
- "Poverty and the Extent of Child Obesity in Canada, Norway and the United States" (with Shelley A. Phipps, Peter S Burton and Lynn N. Lethbridge), Obesity Reviews 2006 (7), p. 5-12.
- "Sampling variability: some observations from a labour supply equation" (with Daniel Gordon and Shelley Phipps), Applied Economics, 2005, 37, 2167-2175.
- "How should we measure the ‘Economic’ Aspects of Well-Being?" (with Andrew Sharpe), The Review of Income and Wealth Series 51, Number 2, June 2005 Pp. 311-336.
- "Measuring Obesity in Young Children" (with Shelley Phipps, Peter Burton and Lynn Lethbridge), Canadian Public Policy Vol. XXX, No. 4, December 2004, Pp. 1–16.
- "Evaluer l’Indice du bien-etre economique dans les pays de l’OCDE" Travail et Emploi, Janvier 2003 No. 93, Pp. 73–94
- "Understanding Growth and Inequality Trends: The Role of Labour Supply in the US and Germany" Canadian Public Policy Vol. XXIX, Supplement January 2003, Pp. S163-S184
- "Long Run Trends in Income Inequality in the US, UK, Sweden, Germany and Canada - A Birth Cohort View" Eastern Economic Journal Vol. 29, No. 1, Winter 2003, Pp. 121–142
- "An Index of Economic Well-being" (with Andrew Sharpe) Indicators: The Journal of Social Health. Spring 2002, Vol. 1 No. 2, Pp. 24–62
- "International Comparisons of Trends in Economic Well-Being" (with Andrew Sharpe) Social Indicators Research Vol. 58, Nos 1-3, June 2002, Pp. 349–382
- "An Index of Economic Well-Being for Selected OECD Countries" (with Andrew Sharpe) The Review of Income and Wealth, Series 48, Number 3, September 2002 Pp. 291–316
- "The Social Welfare Implications, Decomposability and Geometry of the Sen Family of Poverty Indices" (with Kuan Xu), Canadian Journal of Economics Volume 35, Number 1 (February 2002) Pages 138-152
- Xu, Kuan; Osberg, Lars (2001). "How to Decompose Sen-Shorrocks-Thon Poverty Index: A Practitioner's Guide". Journal of Income Distribution. doi:10.25071/1874-6322.1282.
- "Needs and Wants: What is Social Progress and How Should it be Measured?" The Review of Economic Performance and Social Progress, Institute for Research on Public Policy and the Centre for the Study of Living Standards, June 2001, Pages 23–42
- "Trends in Economic Well-Being in Canada in the 1990s" (with Andrew Sharpe) The Review of Economic Performance and Social Progress, Institute for Research on Public Policy and the Centre for the Study of Living Standards, June 2001, Pages 233-246
- "On Sen’s Approach to Poverty Measures and Recent Developments" (with Kuan Xu) China Economic Quarterly (published in Chinese) Vol. 1, No. 1, October 2001, pages 151-170.
- Phipps, Shelley; Burton, Peter; Osberg, Lars (2001). "Time as a Source of Inequality within Marriage: Are Husbands More Satisfied with Time for Themselves than Wives?". Feminist Economics. 7 (2): 1–21. doi:10.1080/1354700110068261.
- "Poverty in Canada and the US : Measurement, Trends and Implications" Canadian Journal of Economics Vol.33, No.4, November 2000 pp. 847–877
- "How Much of Canada ’s Unemployment is "Structural"?" (with Z. Lin) Canadian Public Policy Vol. XXV No. 1, July 2000, pp. S141- S158
- "International Comparisons of Poverty Intensity: Index Decomposition and Bootstrap Inference", (with Kuan Xu), Journal of Human Resources, Volume 35, Number 1, Winter 2000, pp. 51–81; errata corrected Volume 35, Number 3, Summer 2000
- "Poverty Intensity - How Well Do Canadian Provinces Compare?" (with Kuan Xu), Canadian Public Policy, Vol. XXV, No. 2, June 1999, pp. 179–198.
- "A Distribution-Free Test for Deprivation Dominance" (with Kuan Xu) Econometric Reviews, Vol. 17, No. 4, 1998, pp. 415–431.
- "A Note on the link between Inflation and Output Variability in Canada" (with T. Iscan) Journal of Money, Credit and Banking, Vol. 30, No. 2, May 1998, pp. 261–272.
- "How to Value the Poorer Prospects of Youth in the early 1990s?" (with Sadettin Erksoy and Shelley Phipps) Review of Income and Wealth, Series 44, No.1, March 1998, pp. 43–62
- "Economic Growth, Income Distribution and Economic Welfare in Canada 1975-1994" North American Journal of Economics and Finance, Vol. 8, No. 2, 1997, pp. 153–166.
- "The Great Pyramids of Canada", Scientific Correspondence, Nature, p. 510, Vol. 384, December 12, 1996 .
- "The Equity/Efficiency Tradeoff in Retrospect" Canadian Business Economics, Vol. 3, No. 3, April–June Spring 1995, pp. 5–20.
- "Concepts of Unemployment and the Structure of Employment" Economie Appliquée, Vol. XLVIII, No. 1, 1995, pp. 157–181.
- "Predicting Probabilities: Inherent and Sampling Variability in the Estimation of Discrete-Choice Models" with D. Gordon, Z. Lin, and S. Phipps, Oxford Bulletin of Economics and Statistics, Vol. 56, No. 1, February 1994, pp. 13–31.
- "Inter-Regional Migration and Inter-Industry Labour Mobility in Canada: A Simultaneous Approach" (with D. Gordon and Z. Lin) Canadian Journal of Economics, February 1994, Vol. XXVII, No. 1, pp. 58–80.
- "Social Policy and Macro Policy in a Federal State" Canadian Business Economics Vol. 2, No. 1, Fall 1993, pp. 36–45.
- "Labour Supply with Quantity Constraints: Results from a Large Sample of Canadian Workers" (with S. Phipps) Oxford Economic Papers, Volume 45, April 1993, pp. 269–291.
- "Fishing in Different Pools - Job Search Strategies and Job-Finding Success in Canada in the Early 1980s" Journal of Labour Economics, Volume 11, No. 2, April 1993, pp. 348–386.
- "Is it Retirement or Unemployment? Induced retirement and constrained labour supply among older workers" Applied Economics (1993), Vol. 25, pp. 505–519.
- "Searching for a Will O'the Wisp: an empirical study of the NAIRU in Canada" (with M. Setterfield and D. Gordon), European Economic Review, Vol. 36, January 1992, pp. 119–136.
- "Unemployment and Inter-industry labour mobility in Canada in the 1980s" Applied Economics, Vol. 23, No. 11, November 1991, pp. 1707–1718.
- "A Distinct Canada", Policy Options Politiques, Vol. 11, No. 4, May 1990.
- "The 'Disappearance' of Involuntary Unemployment" Journal of Economic Issues, September 1988. Vol. 22, No. 3, pp. 707–728.
- "The Inequality of Wealth in Britain's North American Colonies: The Importance of the Relatively Poor"—with F.K. Siddiq, Review of Income and Wealth, Series 34 No. 2, pp. 143–164, June 1988.
- "Segmented Labour Markets and the Estimation of Wages Functions" Applied Economics, with R. Apostle & D. Clairmont, Vol. 19, No. 12, December 1987, pp. 1603–1624.
- "Job Mobility, Wage Determination and Market Segmentation in the Presence of Sample Selectivity Bias" with L. Mazany, R. Apostle and D. Clairmont, Canadian Journal of Economics, May 1986, Vol. XIX, No. 2, pp. 319–346.
- "The Incidence and Duration of Individual Unemployment: Supply-Side or Demand Side?" with R. Apostle and D. Clairmont, Cambridge Journal of Economics, March 1986, Vol. 10, No. 1, pp. 13–34.
- "Economic Segmentation and Politics" R. Apostle, D. Clairmont & L. Osberg, American Journal of Sociology, Vol. 91, No. 4, January 1986, pp. 905–931.
- "A Nation of Data Processors–Most Canadian Workers Produce Not Goods but Information", Perception, Vol. 14, No. 1, 1985, pp. 23–24.
- "Segmentation and Labour Force Strategies" R. Apostle, D. Clairmont & L. Osberg, Canadian Journal of Sociology, Vol. 10, No. 3, 1985, pp. 253–275.
- "Segmentation and Wage Determination" R. Apostle, D. Clairmont & L. Osberg, Canadian Review of Sociology and Anthropology, Vol. 22, pp. 30–56, 1985.
- "A Note on the Incomes of Lawyers" Relations Industrielles/Industrial Relations, Vol. 40, No. 4., 1985, pp. 865–879.
- "Star Spangled Economics", Marxism Today, Vol. 28, No. 9, September 1984, pp. 30–33.
- "Unemployment Insurance: Insurance or Welfare: Reply" Canadian Public Policy Vol. V, No. 4, Fall 1979, pp. 559–560.
- "Unemployment Insurance in Canada: A Review of the Recent Amendments" Canadian Public Policy, Vol. V, No. 2, Spring, 1979, pp. 223–235.
- "Economic Determinants of Individual Charitable Donations in Canada" (with R.D. Hood and S.A. Martin) Canadian Journal of Economics, November 1977, pp. 653–699.
- "A Note on the Wage Decisions of the Anti-Inflation Board" Canadian Public Policy, Summer 1977, III:3, pp. 377–380.
- "Stochastic Process Models and the Distribution of Earnings" Review of Income and Wealth, September 1977, Series 23, No. 3, pp. 205–217.

== Book chapters ==
- "How Much Can Income Tax on the Top 1 Percent Be Raised?" pp. 28–47 in INEQUALITY AND THE FUTURE OF CANADIAN SOCIETY REVISED PROCEEDINGS OF THE FIRST SD CLARK SYMPOSIUM ON THE FUTURE OF CANADIAN SOCIETY, © Robert Brym, editor, Rock’s Mills Press, Oakville ON (2016)
- "What’s So Bad about Increasing Inequality in Canada" Pages 299-346 in Income Inequality: The Canadian Story, edited by David A. Green, W. Craig Riddell and France St-Hilaire. The Institute for Research on Public Policy, Montreal, 2016
- "Economic Insecurity: Empirical Findings" in C. D’Ambrosio (ed.) Handbook of Research on Economic and Social Well-Being, Edward Elgar, forthcoming
- "Increasing Inequality" pp. 67–78 in Unions Matter: Labour Rights and their Impact on Democracy, Economic Equality and Social Justice edited by Matthew Barens, Between the Lines Press, Toronto 2014
- "The Impact of the Great Recession on Economic Well-being: How Different are OECD Nations and Why?" pp. 83–109 in David McDaid and Cary Cooper (ed) The Economics of Wellbeing: Wellbeing - a Complete Reference Guide Volume V Wiley-Blackwell, Oxford & New York 2014
- "The Index of Economic Well-Being", pp 3161–3163 in Michalos A.C. (Ed.). Encyclopedia of Quality of Life and Well-Being Research. Springer, Dordrecht, Netherlands: 2014
- "Instability Implications of Increasing Inequality: What can be learned from North America?" pp. 85–114 in Disparia Economiche e Sociali: Cause, Conseqguenze e Rimedi Fondazione Cariplo Giuffre Editore, Milan, 2012
- "Why Did Unemployment Disappear from Official Macro-Economic Policy Discourse in Canada?" (2011) pp 127–165 in New Directions for Intelligent Government in Canada: Papers in Honour of Ian Stewart edited by Fred Gorbet and Andrew Sharpe, Centre for the Study of Living Standards, Ottawa 2011
- "Canada’s declining social safety net: EI reform and the 2009 Budget" (2010) Pages 249 – 272 in Charles Beach, Bev Dahlby and Paul Hobson (Editors) The 2009 Federal Budget, John Deutsch Institute for the Study of Economic Policy, Queen’s University, Kingston, 2010
- "Nouvelles Estimations de l’indice de bien-etre economique pour un choix de pays de l’OCDE" (with Andrew Sharpe) pp. 255–278 in Compatabilite Nationale: valeur de l’enterprise, mesure des performances economiques et sociales Paul Champsaur and Pierre-Yves Henin (ed) Economica, Paris, 2006
- "Income Assistance Programs and the Labour Market – Relevant Canadian Experiences and Worker Well Being," pp. 163–216 in Maria Fortuna, Jose Viera and Antonio Menezes (ed) Income Support Programs and Labour Market Participation: Theory and Cases Universidade dos Azores, Ponta Delgada, 2007
- "A Distribution-Free Test for Deprivation Dominance" with Kuan Xu, Econometric Reviews, vol. 17, No. 4, 415-429, 1998; reprint appears as Chapter 5 in Marie V. Lane (ed.) in Trends in Poverty and Welfare Alleviation Issues, Nova Science Publishers, 2006, pp. 101–112.
- "Income Distribution and Social Expenditures" (with Jonathan Schwabish and Timothy Smeeding) Pages 247-288 in Dmitri B. Papadimitriou (ed.) The Distributional Effects of Government Spending and Taxation, Palgrave MacMillan, New York, 2006.
- "Social values for equality and preferences for state intervention in the USA and Europe" with Tim Smeeding forthcoming in Christian Toft and Joseph Cordes (ed) Welfare State Reform In The United States And The European Union – Policy Choices And The Constitution Of The New Welfare Society, Cambridge University Press
- "How Much does Employment Matter for Inequality in Canada and Elsewhere?" Pages 155 to 188 in D. Green and J. Kesselman (ed) Dimensions of Inequality in Canada, UBC Press, Vancouver 2006
- "Leisure" New Palgrave Dictionary of Economics, Second Edition, Eds. Steven N. Durlauf and Lawrence E. Blume. Palgrave Macmillan, 2008.
- "Nobody to Play With? The Implications of Leisure Co-ordination" (with Stephen Jenkins) Pages 113-145 in The Economics of Time Use, D.S. Hamermesh and G.A. Pfann (Editors) Elsevier B.V. 2005
- "Markets, Morality and the Auto-corrosive tendencies of "Standard Economics" " Pages 155-182 in Nico Stehr, Christoph Henning and Bernd Weiler (editors), The Moralization of the Markets. Transaction Books, New Brunswick, New Jersey, 2006
- "Trends in Economic Well-being in OECD countries - What Measure is most relevant for Health?" Pages 296-326 in Healthier Societies: From analysis to action, Clyde Hertzman, Jody Heymann, Morris Barer and Robert Evans (editors) Oxford University Press, 2006
- "Room for Differences? Social Policy in a Global Economy" Pages 75–97 in The Sterling Public Servant: A Global Tribute to Sylvia Ostry. Edited by Jacob Ryten, McGill-Queen's University Press, 2004
- "Income Distribution and Public Social Expenditure: Theories, Effects and Evidence" (with Tim Smeeding and Jon Schwabisch), Pages 823 - 862 in Social Inequality, Kathryn Neckerman (Editor) Russell Sage Foundation, New York, 2004
- "What’s the real issue in the debt debate?" Pages 335-348 in C. Ragan and W. Watson, Is the Debt War Over? Institute for Research on Public Policy, Montreal, 2004
- "Economic and Social Aspects of Productivity: Linkages and Policy Implications" pp 761–787, Productivity Issues in Canada, Someshwar Rao & Andrew Sharpe (ed) University of Calgary Press 2002
- "Has Economic Well-being improved in Canada and the United States?" (with Andrew Sharpe) pp. 123–152 in E. N. Wolff (ed), What has happened to the Quality of Life in the Advanced Industrial Nations, Edward Elgar Publishers, Cheltenham, 2004
- "Poverty Among Senior Citizens -- a Canadian Success Story," The State of Economics in Canada Festschrift in Honour of David Slater, Patrick Grady and Andrew Sharpe (ed) John Deutsch Institute for the Study of Economic Policy, Queen’s University, Kingston, 2001, pp. 151–181
- "Comparisons of Trends in GDP and Economic Well-being - The Impact of Social Capital" (with Andrew Sharpe) Pages 310-351 in John Helliwell (editor), The Contribution of Human and Social Capital to Sustained Economic Growth and Well Being, International Symposium Report, Organization for Economic Co-operation and Development and Human Resource Development Canada, Paris and Ottawa, 2001
- "Poverty Impacts of Trade, Macro-Economic and Social Policy - Canada and the United States in the 1990s" (With Teresa L. Cyrus), Pages 53 to 118, in Incomes and Productivity in North America, Commission for Labor Co-operation, Washington, DC 2001
- "Inequality" -Pages 7371 to 7377 in N. J. Smelser and Paul B. Baltes (editors), 2001, International Encyclopedia of the Social & Behavioral Sciences. Pergamon, Oxford.
- "Stochastic Process Models and the Distribution of Earnings" reprint of 1977 article, Income Distribution, M. Sattinger (ed), Edward Elgar Publishers
- "Long Run Trends in Economic Inequality in Five Countries - A Birth Cohort View" in J.K. Galbraith (ed), The Macro Dynamics of Inequality in the Advanced and Developing Countries, 1999, MacMillan/St. Martin’s Press
- "Federal Expenditures in Canada: The Millennial Vision and its Tensions" pp. 123 – 136 in The 2000 Federal Budget: Retrospect and Prospect, John Deutsch Institute, edited by P. Hobson and T. Wilson, John Deutsch Institute, Queen’s University, Kingston, 2001
- "Poverty Trends and the Canadian Social Union" pp. 213–231 in Canada: The State of the Federation 1999/2000: Toward a New Mission Statement for Canadian Fiscal Federalism, H. Lazar (editor), McGill - Queen’s University Press, Montreal and Kingston, 2000.
- "Les concepts du chômage et la structure de l’emploi," pp. 97–122, in Ver le plein emploi, Pierre Paquette and Mario Seccareccia (ed.) 1998, Les Presses de l’Université de Montreal, Montreal.
- "Economic Policy Variables and Population Health." pp. 579–610 in Determinants of Health: Settings and Issues. Vol. 3 of Canadian Health Action: Building on the Legacy, Editions Multimondes, Sainte Foy, 1998.
- "Meaning and Measurement in Intergenerational Equity," pp. 131–139 in Government Finances and Intergenerational Equity edited by Miles Corak, Statistics Canada and Human Resources Development Canada, Ottawa, 1998.
- "Wages and Unemployment" pp. 149–180 in Employment Policy Options, The Caledon Institute of Social Policy, Ottawa, 1999.
- "Structural Change in North American Labour Markets" pp. 350–356 in M. C. Abbott, C. Beach & R. Chaykowski, Transition and Structural Change in the North American Labour Market, Industrial Relations Centre Press Queen’s University, Kingston, Ontario; 1997.
- "Consensus and Controversy in the Debate on Deficit Reduction" (with P. Fortin), pp. ix to xvi in Unnecessary Debts, 1996.
- "Credibility Mountain" (with P. Fortin), pp. 157–172 in Unnecessary Debts, 1996.
- "Social Policy, Macro Policy and the Debt," pp. 124–141 in Unnecessary Debts, 1996.
- "Digging a Hole or Laying the Foundation? The Objectives of Macroeconomic Policy in Canada," pp. 3–13 in The Unemployment Crisis, 1996.
- "Unemployment Insurance and Unemployment-Revisited," pp. 75–106 in The Unemployment Crisis, 1996.
- "The Distribution of Income, Wealth and Economic Security: The Impact of Unemployment Insurance Reforms in Canada" (with S. Erksoy and S. Phipps), pp. 321–345 in The Distribution of Welfare and Household Production: International Perspectives, S. Jenkins, A. Kapetyn and B.M. van Praag (ed.), 1998, Cambridge University Press.
- "Unemployment, Unemployment Insurance and the Distribution of Income in Canada in the 1980s," with S. Erksoy and S. Phipps, pp. 84–107 in Changing Patterns in the Distribution of Economic Welfare - An International Perspective, P. Gottschalk, B. Gustafsson and E. Palmer (ed.) Cambridge University Press, 1997.
- "International Comparisons of Poverty Intensity: Index Decomposition and Bootstrap Inference" with Kuan Xu, Bulletin of the International Statistical Institute, Tome LVII, Book 2, pp. 289–292, Istanbul, 1997.
- "Is Unemployment or Unemployment Insurance the Problem in Atlantic Canada?" pp. 215–228 in The Rock in a Hard Place, D. May & A. Hollett, C.D. Howe Institute, Toronto, 1995.
- "Jobs and Growth - The Missing Link," pp. 57 to 69 in A New Social Vision for Canada? Perspectives on the Federal Discussion Paper on Social Security and Reform, K. Banting and K. Battle (ed) School of Policy Studies, Kingston, Ontario, 1994.
- "Comment: The Nature of Dependency" pp. 123–129 in K.G. Banting, B.M. Brown & T.J. Courchene, The Future of Fiscal Federalism, School of Policy Studies, Queen's University, Kingston, Ontario, 1994.
- Integrating Social and Economic Policy - Micro Transitions and Macro Policy in a Federal State, pp. 83–100 in E.B. Reynolds (ed.) Income Security in Canada: Changing Needs, Changing Means, Institute for Research on Public Policy, Montreal, P.Q., 1993.
- "What's Fair? The Problem of Equity in Taxation" pp. 63–86 in Fairness in Taxation: Explaining the Principles, edited by A.M. Maslove, University of Toronto Press, Toronto, 1993.
- "Equity and Efficiency in a Decentralized Federation - The Role of a Social Charter," pages 123-141 in Social Protection and the European Economic and Monetary Union, J. Pacolet (editor), Avebury Publishing Co., Gower Publishing Group, Aldershot, England, 1996.
- "A Social Charter for Canada," with S. Phipps, pp1–34 in A Social Charter for Canada? Perspectives on the Constitutional Entrenchment of Social Rights. H. Echenberg, A. Milner, J. Myles, L. Osberg, S. Phipps, J. Richards, W. Robson, 1992.
- "Sustainable Social Development" pp. 227–242 in R.C. Allen & G. Rosenbluth (ed.), False Promises: The Failure of Conservative Economics, New Star Books, Vancouver, 1992.
- "Canada's Economic Performance: Inequality, Poverty and Growth," pp. 39–52 in R.C. Allen & G. Rosenbluth (ed.), False Promises: The Failure of Conservative Economics, New Star Books, Vancouver, 1992.
- "Democracy, Affordability, and the Social Charter: A Reply," pp. 111–117 in A Social Charter for Canada? Perspectives on the Constitutional Entrenchment of Social Rights. H. Echenberg, A. Milner, J. Myles, L. Osberg, S. Phipps, J. Richards, W. Robson, 1992.
- "The Constitution and the Social Contract" with R. Boadway and K. Norrie, Pp. 225 to 255 in Economic Dimensions of Constitutional Change, Vol. I, R. Boadway, T. Courchene & D. Purvis (editors), John Deutsch Institute, Queen's University, Kingston, 1991.
- "The Acquisition of Wealth in Nova Scotia in the late Nineteenth Century" (with F.K. Siddiq) in Research in Economic Inequality, Vol. 4, pp. 181–202, 1994 [Festschrifte for Nancy Ruggles], JA1 Press, E.N. Wolff (ed).
- "Distributional Issues and the Future of the Welfare State" pp. 160–174 in Perspective 2000, K. Newton, T. Schweitzer & J.P. Voyer (ed.) Economic Council of Canada, Ottawa, 1990.
- "The Pyrrhic Victory--Unemployment, Inflation and Macro-economic Policy," pp. 111–131 in J. Cornwall (ed.), After Stagflation, Basil Blackwell, Oxford 1984.
- "Producer Cartels: Trade Unions of the Third World" (with R. Martin), pp. 501–526 in R. St. J. MacDonald (ed.), The International Law and Policy of Human Welfare, 1978, Sijthoff and Noordhoff, Alphen Aan den Rijn, Netherlands.
- "The Distribution of Wealth and Riches"—reprinted from Economic Inequality in Canada, pp. 92–96 in Social Inequality in Canada, J. Curtis, E. Grabb, N. Guppy & S. Gilbert, Prentice-Hall, Scarborough, 1988.
- "Remarks at the Workshop on Cost of Inaction," pp. 33–39 in A. Davidson & M. Dence (Ed.) The Brundtland Challenge and the Cost of Inaction, The Royal Society of Canada/Institute for Research on Public Policy, Halifax, 1988.
- "The Measurement of Economic Well-Being," pp. 49–89 in Approaches to Economic Well-Being, D. Laidler (ed) Vol. 26 for the Royal Commission on the Economic Union and Development Prospects for Canada, University of Toronto Press, Toronto, 1985.
- "Regional Demand Supply Projections and Migration: Comment," Canadian Labour Markets in the 1980s, pp. 128–131, W.D. Wood (ed.), Queen's University, Industrial Relations Centre, 1983.

== Selected professional positions ==
- Canadian Economics Association: Vice President (1997–98), President-Elect (1998–99), President (1999–2000), Past President (2000–2001).
- International Association for Research in Income and Wealth: Chair, Search Committee for Editor and Executive Director (2002–2003), Executive Council (1996–2004), Review Articles Editor, The Review of Income and Wealth (1990–2007).
- Belgian Federal Science Policy Office–Expert Reviewer–"Society and Future" Research Programme–Theme T7 ‘Inequality and Social Exclusion" June/July 2007
- LifePaths Advisory Committee, Policy Research Initiative and Population, Work, and Family Research
- Expert round table on the "Review of the Employment Insurance Coverage. November 6, 2004, Ottawa
- International Advisory Board, Centre for Comparative Public Management and Social Policy, City University of Hong Kong, 2000 - 2002
- Israel Science Foundation - referee - April, 2000
- SSHRC Adjudication Committees: Chair - Initiative on the New Economy, Skills Research Initiative Adjudication Committee (April, 2004), CISS-Data Training Schools - Pilot Project competition (March 2000), "Relationships in Transition" Initiative (September 1999), Atkinson Foundation - Workshop on Indicators of Well Being, Toronto (October 14, 1999)
- Member, Advisory Board, Luxembourg Income Study, 1999–2002
- Editorial Board - Social Indicators Research
- Editorial Advisory Board, Political Economy Series, University of Toronto Press
- Expert Witness: Standing Committee on Finance, House of Commons of Canada, Ottawa (April 28, 1999), Advisory Committee to the Minister of Labour on the Changing Workplace (September 1996 to May 1997).
- Advisory Panel of Experts on Learning, Human Resource Development Canada, 1995-
- Board of Directors - Centre for the Study of Living Standards, Ottawa.
- Member, Academic Advisory Board of the FOCAL/CIS Joint Research Project "After NAFTA"
- Advisory Committee on Labour Demand Data - Statistics Canada, 1994/96
- Organizer, Canadian Employment Research Forum Conference on the Evaluation of Unemployment Insurance, Ottawa, October 14–15, 1994.
- Economic Issues Advisory Committee, Royal Commission on Aboriginal Peoples 1993/94
- Expert Witness (Bill C-3 Equalization Transfers), House of Commons Standing Committee on Finance, Ottawa, Ontario, February 23, 1994.
- Member, Board of Directors, Canadian Employment Research Forum, 1993–2001
- Member, Advisory Committee on Social Conditions, Statistics Canada, 1992-1997.
- Advisory Committee on Economic Issues in Constitutional Reform - Province of Nova Scotia, June/December 1991.
- Molson Prize Selection Committee, (SSHRC and Canada Council, 1991/92).
- Advisory Board, Employment Research Forum, Employment and Immigration Canada, 1991-1993.
- Adjudication Committee (Economics) Social Sciences and Humanities Research Council of Canada, 1990/91.
- Social Policy Consultative Committee: Health and Welfare Canada - 1989/93.
- Committee on University Research. Royal Society of Canada, 1989-91.
- Member, Research Advisory Committee. Canadian Labour Market and Productivity Centre, Ottawa, 1987-.
- Member, Advisory Committee on Services, Statistics Canada 1988-92.
- Editorial Board Canadian Public Policy, 1988-1995.
- Member, Advisory Committee on Social Policy, Economic Council of Canada, 1988-1992.
