= The Daily News (Halifax) =

Canadian daily newspaper in Nova Scotia

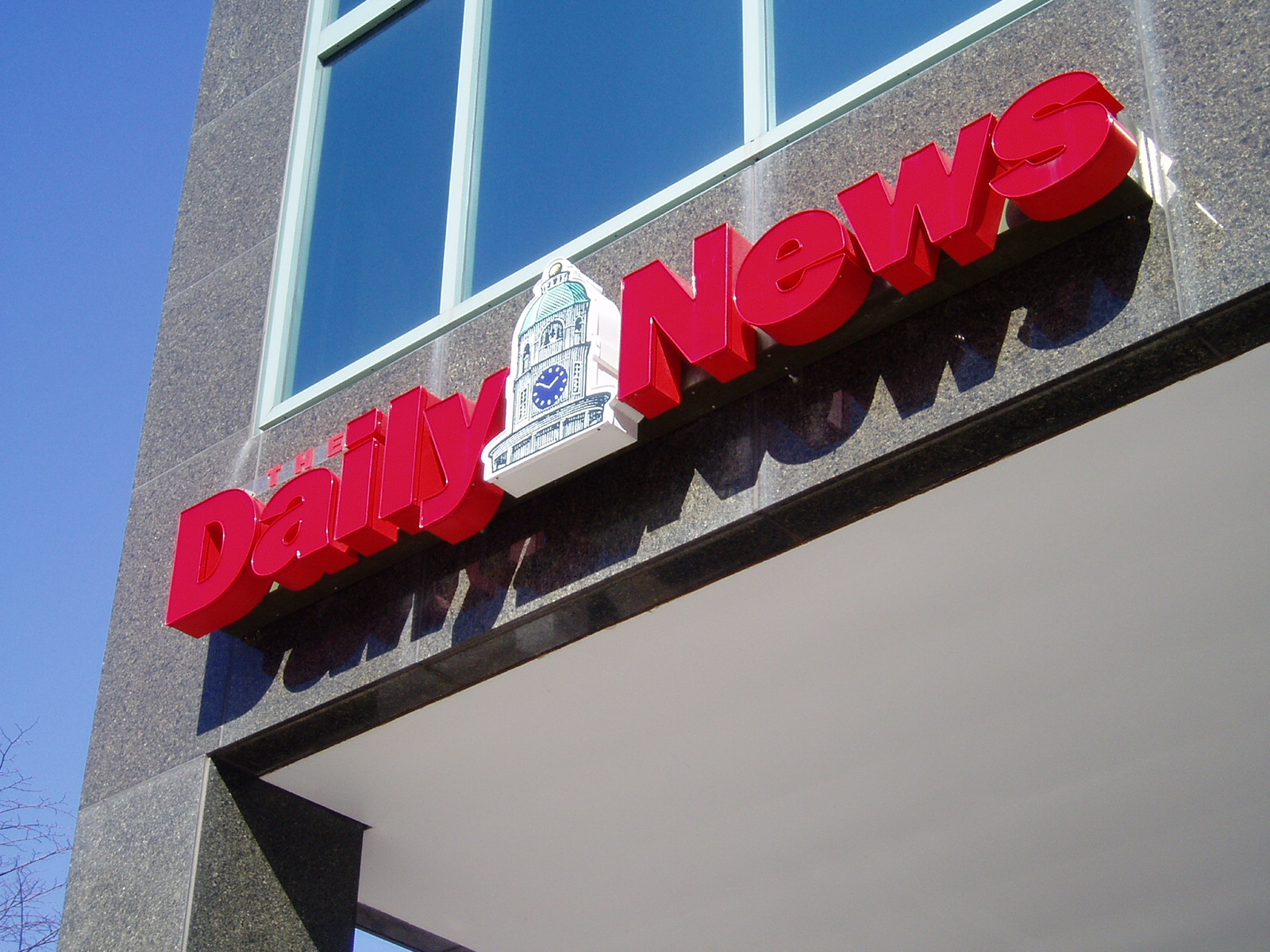
- Daily News sign (2007)
- Type: Daily newspaper
- Format: Tabloid
- Owner: Transcontinental
- Publisher: Transcontinental
- Founded: 1974
- Ceased publication: 2008
- Headquarters: Lower Water Street; Halifax, Nova Scotia

The Daily News was a tabloid newspaper in Halifax, Nova Scotia, that was published from 1974 until ceasing operations in February 2008.

== History ==
The Daily News owed its existence to David Bentley, who, along with his wife Diana and Patrick and Joyce Sims, founded The Great Eastern News Company Ltd. in 1974 and started publishing a weekly broadsheet named The Bedford-Sackville News. This paper focused on the suburban communities of Bedford and Lower Sackville within the Halifax-Dartmouth metropolitan area.

The Great Eastern News Company Ltd. was initially published out of Bentley's home but a press was acquired in 1978 and the company moved into a new building. A year later the format changed to a tabloid and began publishing six days a week as The Bedford-Sackville Daily News. The paper gained a reputation for printing stories not covered by its competition, The Chronicle Herald, some of which were considered sensational. In 1981, Bentley's company moved to downtown Halifax from its suburban base and redubbed its tabloid as The Daily News, while gaining a reputation for hard-hitting stories and expanded sports coverage.

In 1985 the Newfoundland Capital Corporation gained a controlling interest in the paper and complete ownership in 1987 which resulted in a move to Dartmouth. The paper was subsequently redesigned and a press upgrade made it one of the first papers in Atlantic Canada to incorporate colour; on October 2, 1988 it became the first paper in the region to publish a Sunday edition. Under NCC ownership, the tendency for sensational coverage was tempered as the paper became more mainstream.

On July 1, 1997 NCC sold the paper to Southam Newspapers, which was controlled by Conrad Black's Hollinger Corporation. On November 15, 2000, Hollinger sold The Daily News, along with the majority of its major Southam papers to CanWest Global Communications in what was termed the biggest media deal in Canadian history.

Over several years, CanWest Global attempted to use The Daily News to bolster its news team at its Global Maritimes TV station, however this ended on August 9, 2002 when the paper was sold to GTC Transcontinental Inc., along with other former Southam properties in eastern and western Canada.

GTC Transcontinental redesigned the paper in 2003, maintaining the tabloid format and relocated it from Dartmouth to downtown Halifax.

== Closure ==
On February 11, 2008, GTC Transcontinental executives made a surprise announcement to staff and readers that The Daily News would cease publication effective immediately, citing declining advertising revenue and circulation subscriptions.

The Daily News was replaced with a local version of the free Metro newspaper aimed primarily at commuters.

A total of 92 staff members from the newsroom, circulation department, and printing plant were given severance packages based upon 2 weeks salary per year of employment with the newspaper. The Halifax edition of Metro has rehired 20 staff members while other staff may be placed with GTC Transcontinental newspapers elsewhere in Atlantic Canada.

== Additional information ==
- The Daily News is credited with being the first Canadian newspaper (and one of the first in the world) to have an online edition.
- The Daily News published the work of the political cartoonists Theo Moudakis (Mou) and Michael de Adder.
- The paper had a pullout Weekend HFX section.
- The connection to Bedford-Sackville was maintained with a weekly insert dedicated to the suburban area in which it was founded.
- The paper offered an internet edition using Zinio which allowed readers to view the actual hardcopy layout online.
