= David Bentley (businessman) =

Canadian businessman

- Citizenship: Nova Scotia
- Occupation: Businessman

David Bentley is a Canadian businessman from Halifax, Nova Scotia who has been involved in print media since the 1970s.

Born in England, Bentley emigrated to Nova Scotia in 1966.

== The Daily News ==
Bentley and his wife Diana, along with Patrick and Joyce Sims, founded, The Great Eastern News Company Ltd., in 1974 and started publishing a weekly broadsheet named The Bedford-Sackville News, which focused on the suburban communities of Bedford and Lower Sackville within the Halifax-Dartmouth metropolitan area.

The Great Eastern News Company Ltd., was initially published out of Bentley's home but a press was acquired in 1978 and the company moved into a new building. A year later the format changed to a tabloid and began publishing six days a week as The Bedford-Sackville Daily News. The paper gained a reputation for printing stories that were not covered by its competition, The Chronicle Herald, some of which were considered sensational. In 1981, Bentley's company moved into downtown Halifax from its suburban base and renamed the tabloid as The Daily News, while gaining a reputation for hard-hitting stories and expanded sports coverage.

In 1985 the Newfoundland Capital Corporation or NCC gained a controlling interest in the paper and purchased Bentley's remaining share in 1987.

== Frank ==
With the money received from sale of The Daily News to NCC, Bentley, along with Lyndon Watkins and Dulcie Conrad started a bi-weekly "gossip rag" or "scandal magazine" known as Frank to sell the sensational news coverage that mainstream press was averse to covering. Rare to the industry, the magazine had no advertising and operated solely from its print sales.

The first issue was published in November 1987 and focused on gossip about the private lives of the rich, famous and politically connected in the Maritime provinces.

Bentley expanded the Frank franchise to include an Ottawa edition in 1989 with the help of Michael Bate. This edition quickly outsold its Maritime counterpart, feeding off the void of gossip news in mainstream media in the nation's capital.

Bentley followed a successful formula with the magazine, feeding the need for gossip among the powerful, as well as the average citizen. It was often rumoured that each edition was incorporated as a separate legal entity, leaving no assets for potential lawsuits over libel, however there is no proof that this was ever done.

While the Maritime edition continued to grow in popularity, the Ottawa edition took off in just a few years, rising from a start of 600 copies to a publishing run of over 16,000 at the height of the Mulroney years. It was during this time that the Ottawa edition of Frank brought the magazine its greatest notoriety by satirically running a contest in 1991 inviting young Tories to "Deflower Caroline Mulroney, invoking the Prime Minister's wrath on Bentley and his partners. Mulroney joined several women's groups in denouncing the ad as an incitement to rape, but the magazine maintained that it was commenting on the Prime Minister's perceived habit of using his daughter as a political prop. The magazine also scooped the identity of former Prime Minister Pierre Trudeau's love child with Deborah Coyne in 1991.

Bate subsequently bought out Bentley and his other partners to take the Ottawa edition of Frank independent.

Bentley continued with his publication of the Maritime edition of Frank, leading the magazine to several scoops, including the charges of sexual assault against former Premier of Nova Scotia and Trudeau-era cabinet minister Gerald Regan, in which he was subsequently acquitted.

Dulcie Conrad sold her share of the Maritime edition of Frank in the mid-1990s to Bentley and Watkins. In September 2000, Bentley and Watkins sold an equity stake in the Maritime edition of Frank to one of the magazine's reporters, Clifford Boutilier.

== AllNovaScotia ==
In March 2001, Bentley and his daughter Caroline Wood launched an online Monday to Friday business newspaper focusing exclusively on Nova Scotian businesses entitled, AllNovaScotia.

Similar to the Frank experiment, allnovascotia.com contains a hard-hitting approach to news, however, it focuses exclusively on business-related news and not personal gossip or scandal but does contain scoops on lawsuits and other information not found in mainstream Nova Scotian media. Bentley and his daughter contribute to the paper along with several other reporters. The online newspaper survives on subscriptions and advertisements. In 2016, Bentley and Wood launched a sister publication, allNewfoundlandLabrador, bringing its model to St. John's, but sharing resources and providing subscriber access to both sites. In 2020, the family business expanded again with the launch of allNewBrunswick.
