= Fabrice Taylor =

Canadian journalist

Fabrice Taylor is a Canadian financial journalist, publisher and investor who writes a stock-market column in The Globe and Mail newspaper and Report on Business Magazine.

== Career ==
Since January, 2011, Taylor has authored and published The President’s Club Investment Letter, a joint-venture with The Globe and Mail. He also writes an associated investment blog.

== Early career ==
Taylor began his journalism career at The Globe and Mail in 1995 and later became the paper’s capital markets columnist. He won a National Newspaper Award Citation of Merit in 2003 and that same year obtained his CFA designation.

== Background ==
Taylor's mother is from France and his father is English Canadian. His paternal grandfather, Reverend Dr. Robert L. Taylor, was the moderator of the Presbyterian Church of Canada.
