= History of Halifax, Nova Scotia =

Halifax
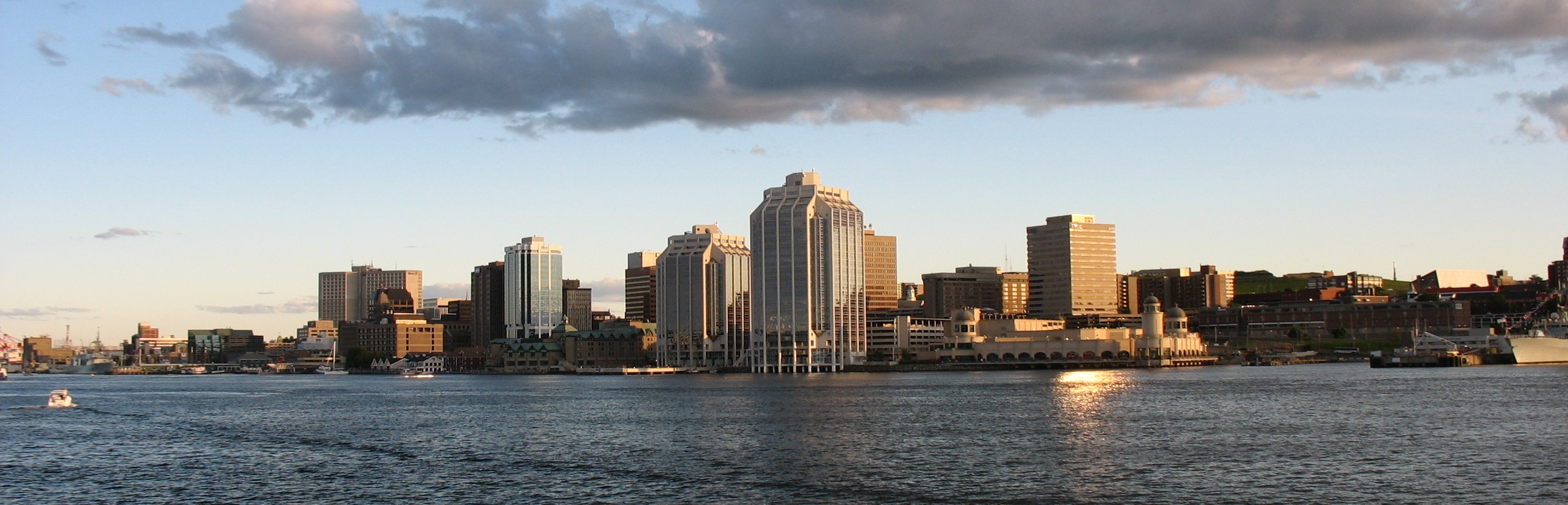
- Downtown Halifax in July 2007

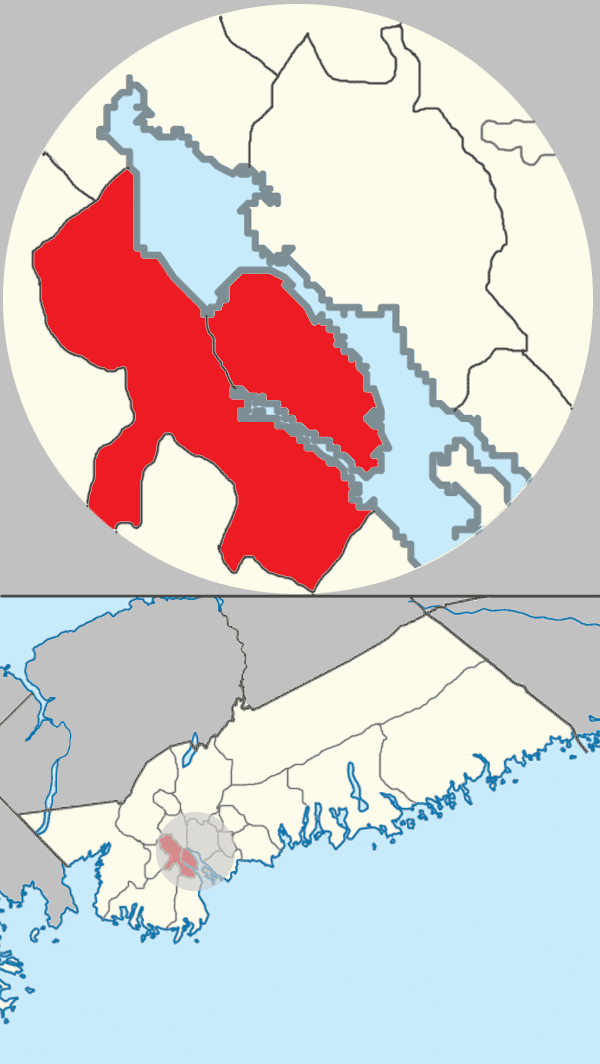
- Map of the boundaries of the former Halifax and the relationship to the rest of the regional municipality

- Location of Halifax in Nova Scotia
- Coordinates: 44°40′12″N 63°36′36″W
- Country: Canada
- Province: Nova Scotia
- Municipality: Halifax
- Founded: 21 June 1749
- City: 1841
- Amalgamated: 1 April 1996

Area
  - Land: 61.961 km^{2} (23.923 sq mi)
- Elevation: 0–119 m (0–390 ft)

Population (2021)
  - Total: 156,141
  - Density: 2,519/km^{2} (6,520/sq mi)
- Time zone: UTC-4 (AST)
  - Summer (DST): UTC-3 (ADT)
- Canadian Postal code: B3H to B3S
- Area codes: 782, 902
- GNBC Code: CAPHL
- NTS Map: 011D12

The history of Halifax, Nova Scotia, begins with its founding by the British in 1749 on territory gained from a war with the French. It was part of the traditional territory of the Mi'kmaq and settled by French Acadians. The new settlement was named for head of the British Board of Trade, Earl of Halifax, who authorized the settlement, becoming the colonial capital. Its location was chosen for its deep harbour. A permanent navy base, the Halifax Naval Yard was established in 1759. The city's fortunes were tied to the military presence. With the end of the French and Indian War in 1763, the French were no longer a threat and military personnel were deployed elsewhere.

Nova Scotia was the fourteenth British colony on the Atlantic seaboard, and with political resistance on the southern Thirteen Colonies that led to the American War of Independence (1775-1783), the importance of Halifax to the British Empire increased. The importance remained through the War of 1812 between Britain and the United States. With the end of the Napoleonic Wars in Europe in 1815, Britain relocated the major Royal Naval station to Bermuda in 1818, leading to an economic slump in the aftermath. The city recovered economically through the efforts of local entrepreneurs. Halifax continued to play a role in military conflicts in the 19th and 20th centuries.

The modern municipality of Halifax, Nova Scotia was created on 1 April 1996, when the City of Dartmouth, the City of Halifax, the Town of Bedford, and the County of Halifax were amalgamated, forming the Halifax Regional Municipality. As of 2021, the community (defined by the boundaries of the City immediately prior to the 1996 amalgamation) has 156,141 inhabitants within an area of 61.961 km^{2} (23.923 sq mi).

== Early history ==
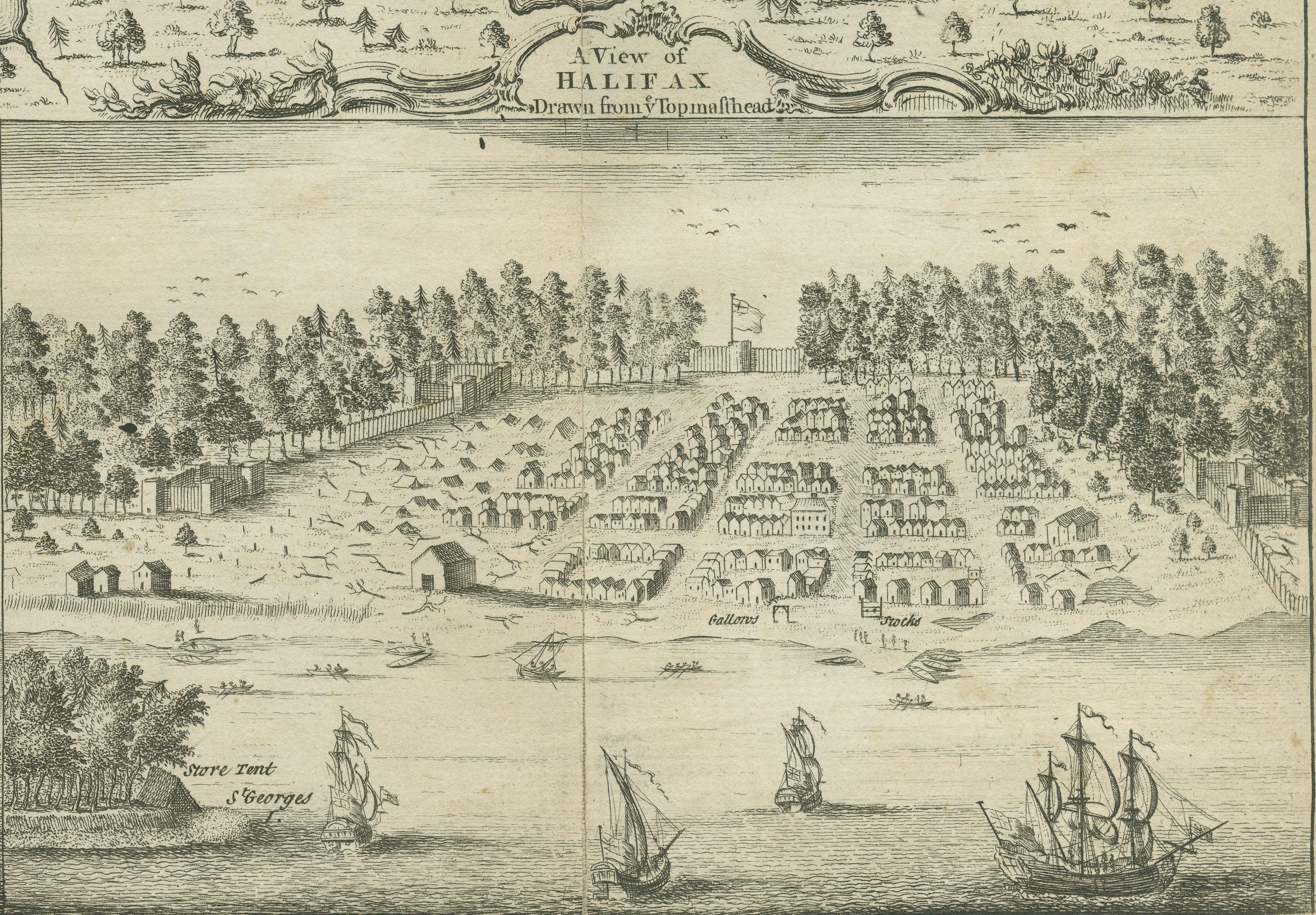
A 1749 sketch of Halifax from the top of a masthead

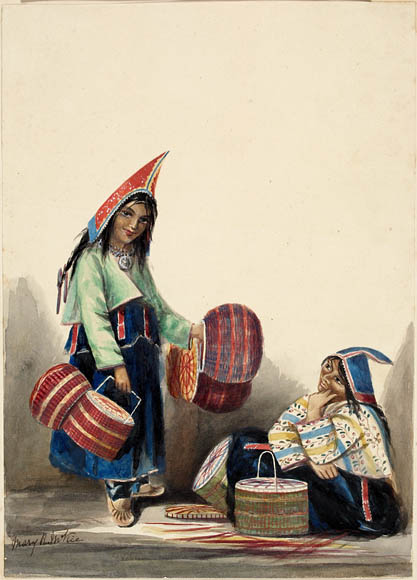
Mi'kmaw Women Selling Baskets, Halifax, Nova Scotia, by Mary R. McKie, c. 1845

=== Indigenous population and French settlement ===
The Halifax area (and the entire peninsula of Nova Scotia) has been populated by Miꞌkmaq, who called harbour around Halifax K'jipuktuk or Chebookt, (Note: Also rendered as "Chebooktook") meaning "Chief Harbour" or "Great Harbour" in the Mi'kmaq language, since long before recorded history. However, prior to European (French and British) colonization, Mi'kmaq communities were often mobile, alternating winter and summer seasons at different locations. In the area of Halifax, Mi'kmaq spent the summer on the shores of the Bedford Basin, moving to points inland before the harsh Atlantic winter set in. Examples of Miꞌkmaq habitation and burial sites have been found from Point Pleasant Park area, known by the Mi'kmaq as Amntu'kati, to the north and south mainland. This seasonal cycle of Mi'kmaq occupation of this part of their lands remained largely unaffected by the initial establishment of French settlements elsewhere in the region during the 1600s and early 1700s, such as the colonial French capital, Port-Royal. The British conquered Acadia in 1710, but initially made no serious attempt to settle the area.

A notable exception to this bypassing of Halifax by Europeans was the catastrophic Duc d'Anville Expedition, sent by France in 1746 to recapture Annapolis Royal. It arrived in the Bedford Basin after a calamity-laden three-month crossing of the Atlantic, having suffered disease, lightning strikes that blew up ships, horrible storms, and attacks by the British Navy. After finally arriving in Nova Scotia, and bringing his fleet into the Bedford Basin, the Duc d'Anville died after suffering a stroke, throwing the expedition into even greater chaos. Eventually, the unfortunate expedition moved on towards Annapolis Royal, which it failed to attack, leaving the Mi'kmaq residents of the area, who had provided much-needed support to the French while they were based in the Bedford Basin, riven by the diseases (primarily typhus & typhoid fever) that had struck down many French sailors.

== 18th century ==
=== British settlement ===
The British settled Halifax in 1749, which sparked a conflict known as Father Le Loutre's War. To guard against Miꞌkmaq, Acadian, and French attacks on the new Protestant settlements, British fortifications were erected in Halifax (Citadel Hill) (1749), Bedford (Fort Sackville) (1749), Dartmouth (1750), and Lawrencetown (1754).

Despite their conquest of Acadia in 1710, the British made no serious attempt to colonize Nova Scotia, aside from keeping a presence at Annapolis Royal, the former French capital, and Canso. The peninsula was dominated by Catholic Acadians and Miꞌkmaq residents. The British founded Halifax in order to counter the influence of France's Fortress of Louisbourg at the mouth of the Gulf of St. Lawrence after returning the fortress to French control as part of the Treaty of Aix-la-Chapelle (1748).

The British founded Halifax under the direction of the Board of Trade under the command of Governor Edward Cornwallis in 1749. The founding of Halifax and the influx of British Protestant settlers led to Father Le Loutre's War. During the war, Miꞌkmaq and Acadians raided the capital region 13 times.

The first European settlement in the community was an Acadian community at present-day Lawrencetown. These Acadians joined the Acadian Exodus when the British established themselves on Halifax Peninsula. The establishment of the Town of Halifax, named after the British Earl of Halifax, in 1749 led to the colonial capital being transferred from Annapolis Royal.

==== Father Le Loutre's War (1749-1755) ====
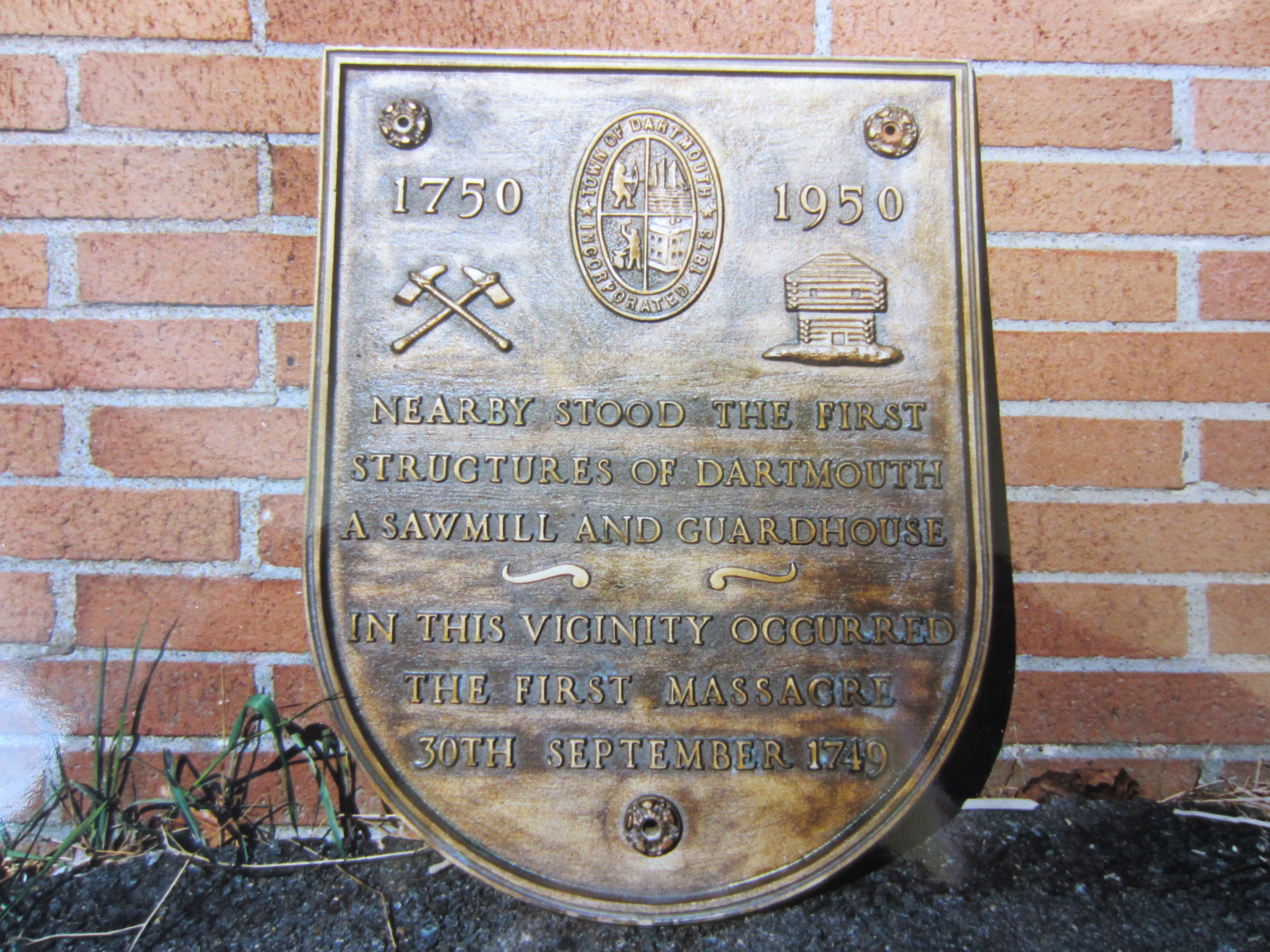
Plaque to the 1749 Raid on Dartmouth and the blockhouse that was built in response in Father Le Loutre's War, now known as Dartmouth Heritage Museum

The founding of Halifax in 1749

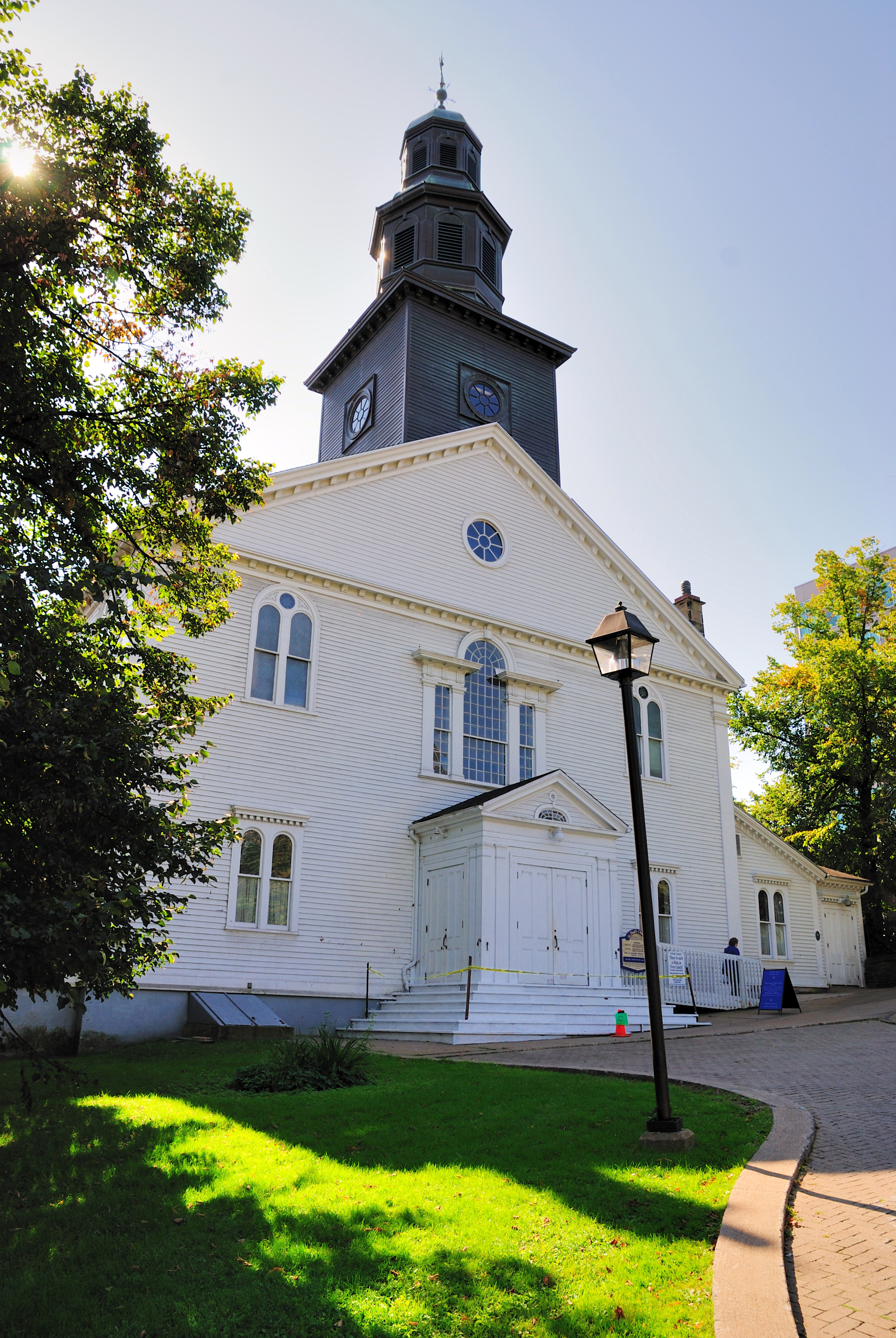
St. Paul's Church, built in 1750, is the oldest building in Halifax and the oldest surviving Protestant church in Canada.

The establishment of Halifax marked the beginning of Father Le Loutre's War. The war began when Edward Cornwallis arrived to establish Halifax with thirteen transports and a sloop-of-war on June 21, 1749. The Mi'kmaq viewed the establishment of Halifax as violating a treaty they had signed with British colonial authorities in 1726 after the end of Father Rale's War. Cornwallis brought along 1,176 settlers and their families. In 1750, the sailing ship Alderney arrived with 151 immigrants. Municipal officials at Halifax decided that these new arrivals should be settled on the eastern side of Halifax Harbour.

During Father Le Loutre's War, the Miꞌkmaq and Acadians raided in the capital region (Halifax and Dartmouth) twelve times. On September 30, 1749, about forty Miꞌkmaq attacked six men who were in Dartmouth cutting trees. Four of them were killed on the spot, one was taken prisoner and one escaped. The men had been sent to retrieve wood for a sawmill commanded by Major Gilman. Two of the men were scalped and the heads of the others were cut off. The man who managed to escape brought back news of the attack with him. A detachment of rangers was sent after the raiding party and cut off the heads of two Miꞌkmaq and scalped one. This raid was the first of eight against Dartmouth.

As a result of the raid, on October 2, 1749, Cornwallis offered a bounty on the head of every Miꞌkmaq. He set the amount at the same rate that the Miꞌkmaq received from the French for British scalps. As well, to carry out this task, two companies of rangers were raised, one led by Captain Francis Bartelo and the other by Captain William Clapham. These two companies served alongside that of John Gorham's company. The three companies scoured the land around Halifax looking for Miꞌkmaq.

In July 1750, the Miꞌkmaq killed and scalped seven men who were at work in Dartmouth. Four raids were conducted against Halifax Peninsula. The first of these was in July 1750: in the woods of peninsular Halifax, the Miꞌkmaq scalped Cornwallis' gardener, his son and four others. They buried the son, left the gardener's body exposed and carried off the other four bodies.

In August 1750, 353 settlers arrived on the Alderney and founded the town of Dartmouth. The town was laid out in the autumn of that year. The following month, on September 30, 1750, the Mi'kmaq attacked the new settlement, killing five residents.

In October 1750 a group of about eight men went out "to take their diversion; and as they were fowling, they were attacked by the Indians, who took the whole prisoners; scalped ... [one] with a large knife, which they wear for that purpose, and threw him into the sea ..." The next year, on March 26, 1751, the Miꞌkmaq attacked again, killing fifteen settlers and wounding seven, three of which would later die of their wounds. They took six captives, and the regulars who pursued the Miꞌkmaq fell into an ambush in which one of their sergeants were killed. Two days later, on March 28, 1751, Miꞌkmaq abducted another three settlers.

==== Dartmouth Massacre (1751) ====
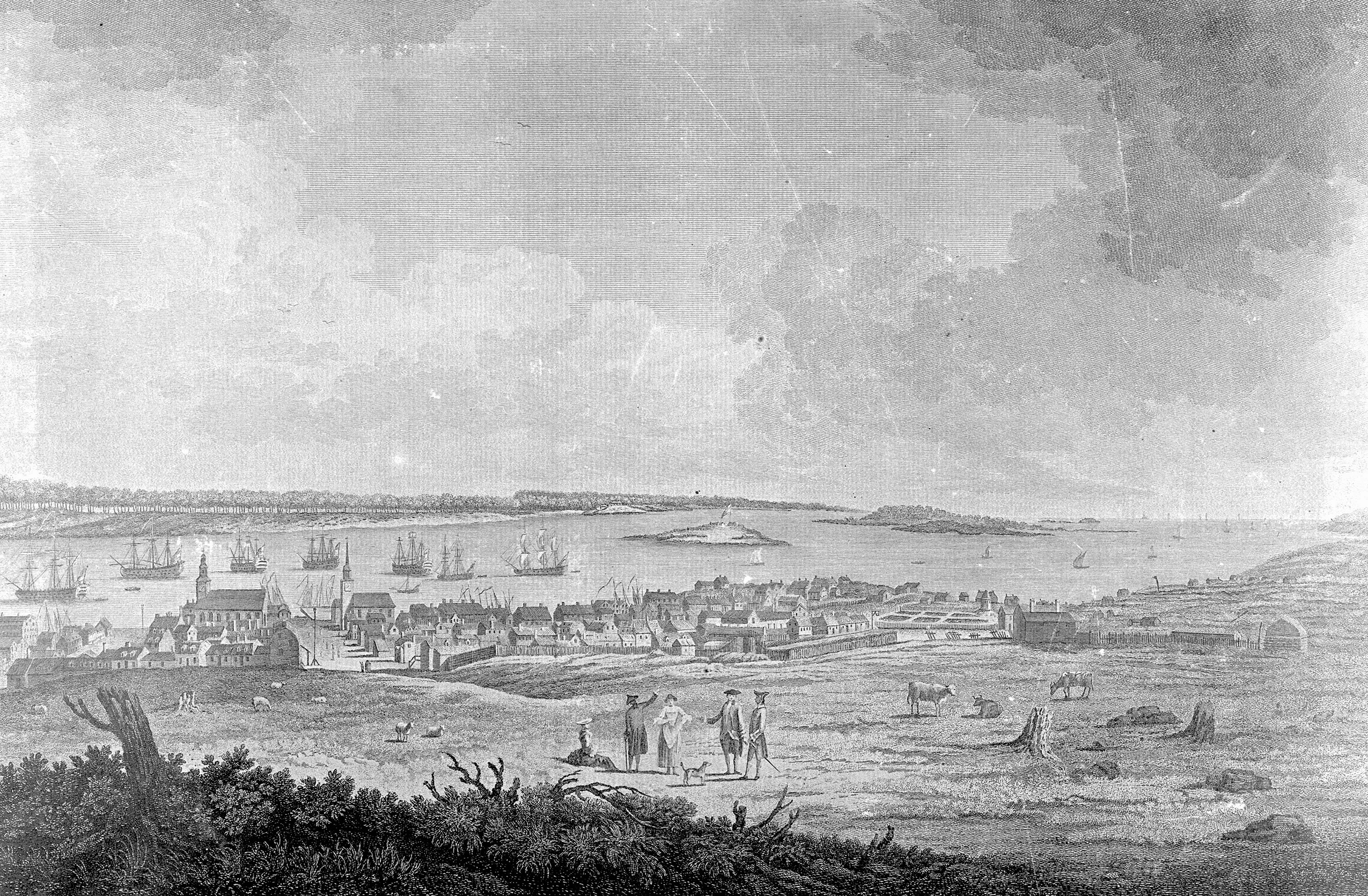
Wooden palisade erected along Dartmouth in response to the Dartmouth Massacre opposite the harbour from Great Pontack (in the lower left corner), present-day Historic Properties

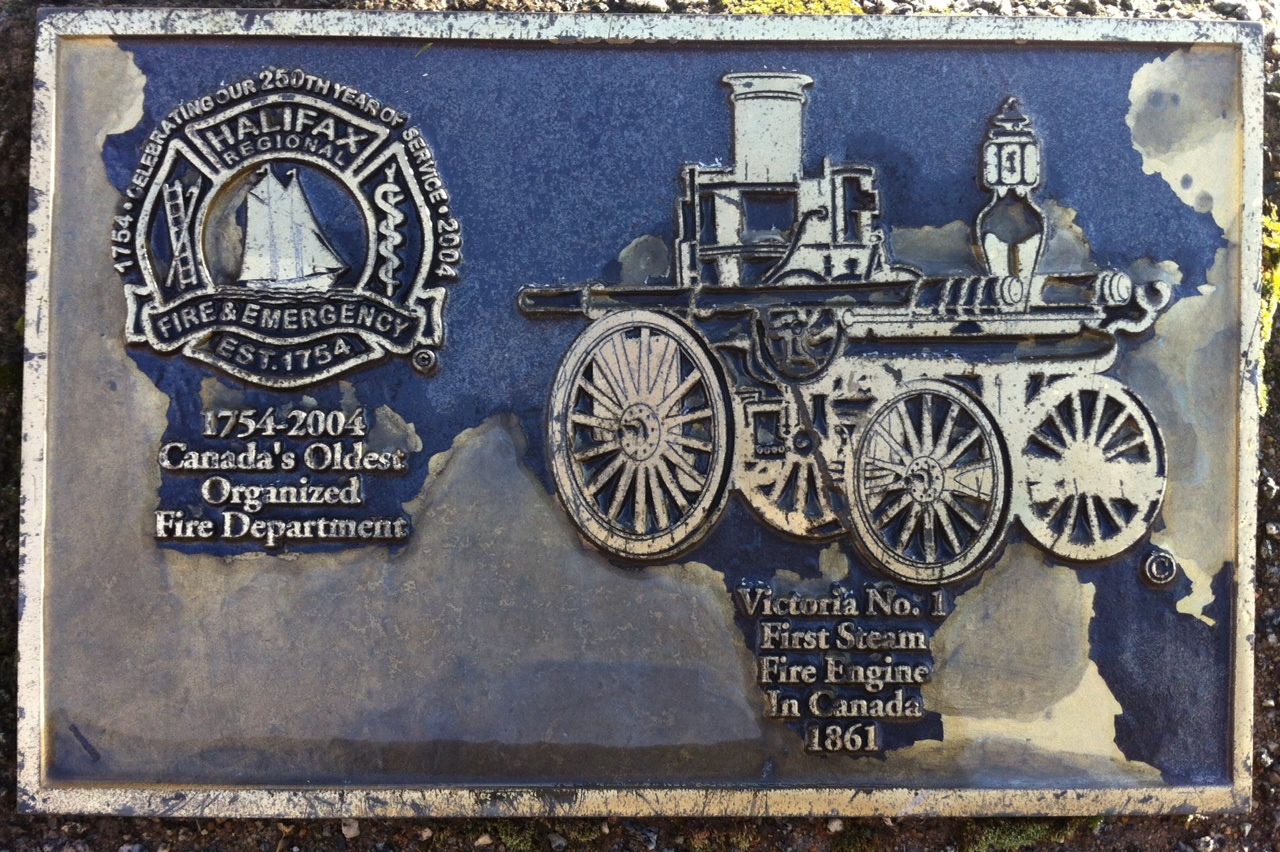
Halifax Fire Department, built in 1754, and a plaque commemorating Canada's first fire department, Grand Parade in Nova Scotia

The worst of these raids was to take place three months later. On May 13, 1751, Joseph Broussard led a party of sixty Miꞌkmaq and Acadians to attack Dartmouth again, in what would be known as the "Dartmouth Massacre". Broussard and the others destroyed the buildings of the settlement, killed twenty settlers, mutilating men, women, children and babies, among them a sergeant, and took more prisoners. he British returned to Halifax with the scalp of one Miꞌkmaq warrior, however, they reported that they had killed six of them.

In 1751, there were two attacks by Mi'kmaq warriors on or near blockhouses located on the northern and southern ends of the isthmus of the Halifax Peninsula. The Mi'kmaq warriors attacked the north blockhouse and killed the men on guard there, and near the south blockhouse, at the end of the Northwest Arm, they attacked a sawmill on a stream flowing out of Chocolate Lake and killed two men. (Map of Halifax Blockhouses | Map 2)

In 1753, when Lawrence became governor, the Miꞌkmaq again attacked at the sawmills near the south blockhouse and killed three men. The Miꞌkmaq made three attempts to retrieve the bodies for their scalps.

Prominent Halifax business person Michael Francklin was captured by a Miꞌkmaq raiding party in 1754 and held captive for three months.

==== French and Indian War (1754-1763) ====
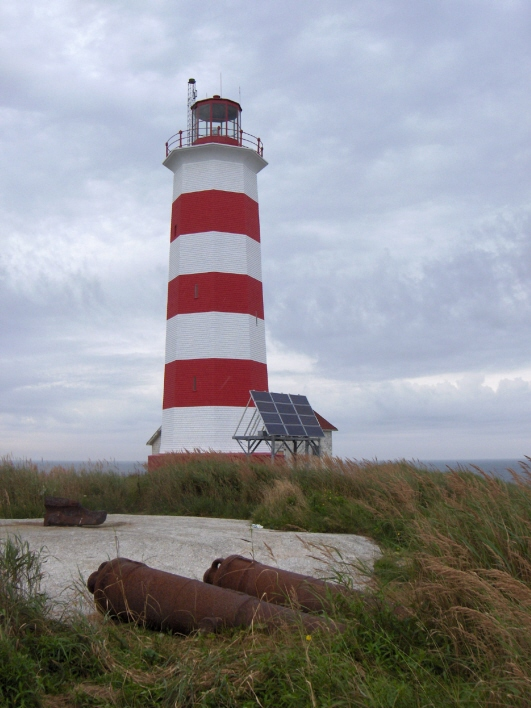
Sambro Island Lighthouse, the oldest lighthouse in North America, built in 1758

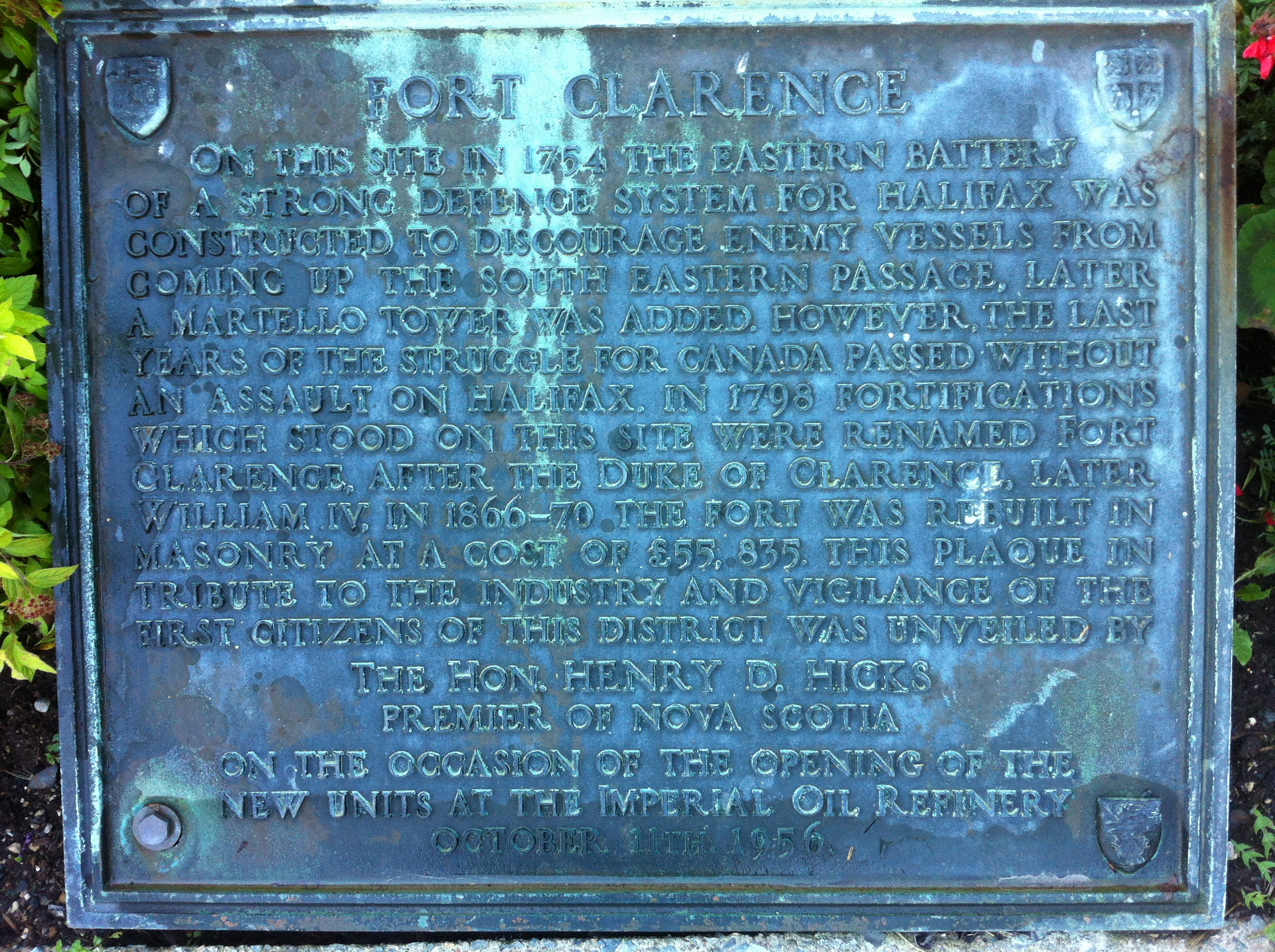
Eastern Battery Plaque, Dartmouth, Nova Scotia

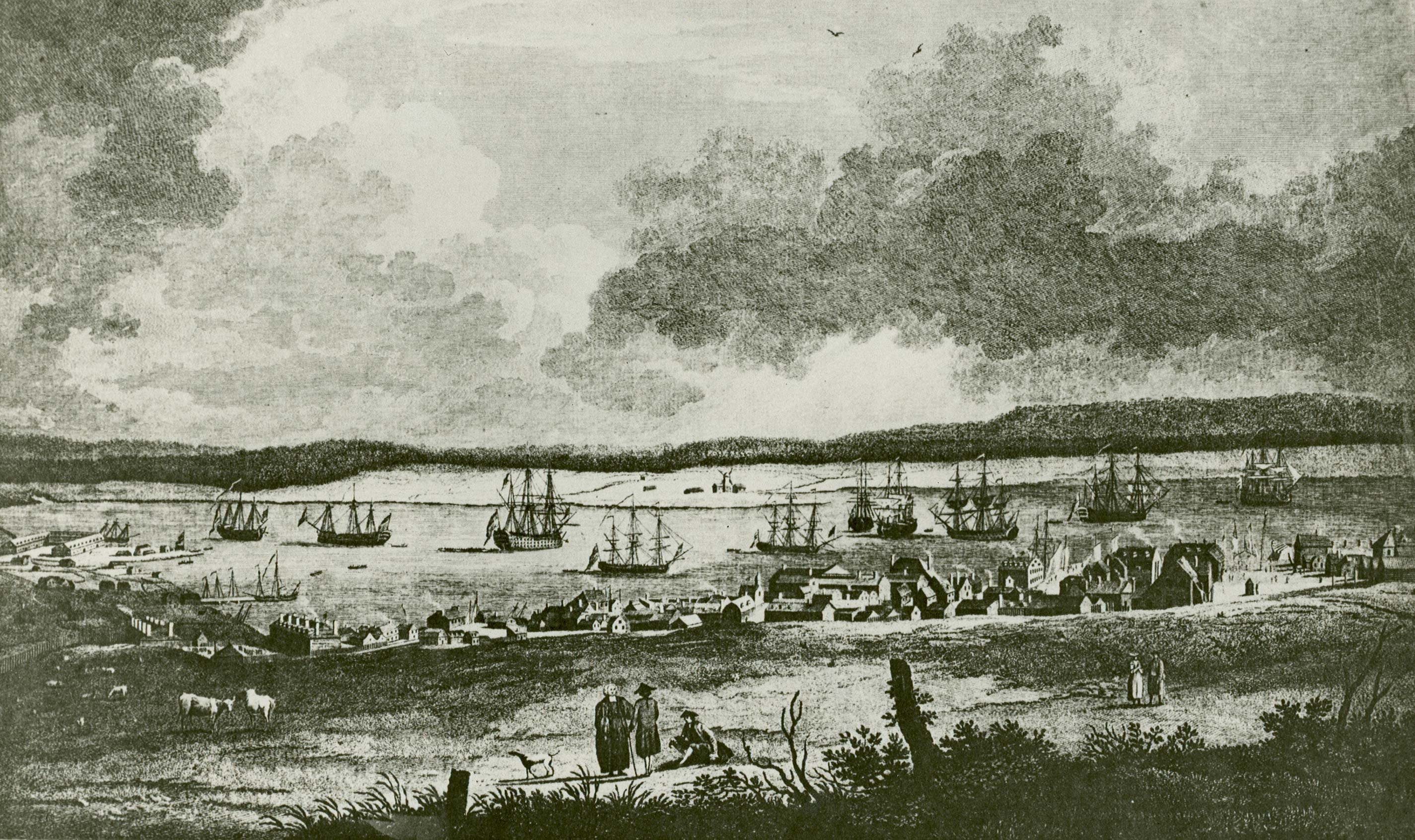
Looking down George Street to Halifax Harbour in 1759

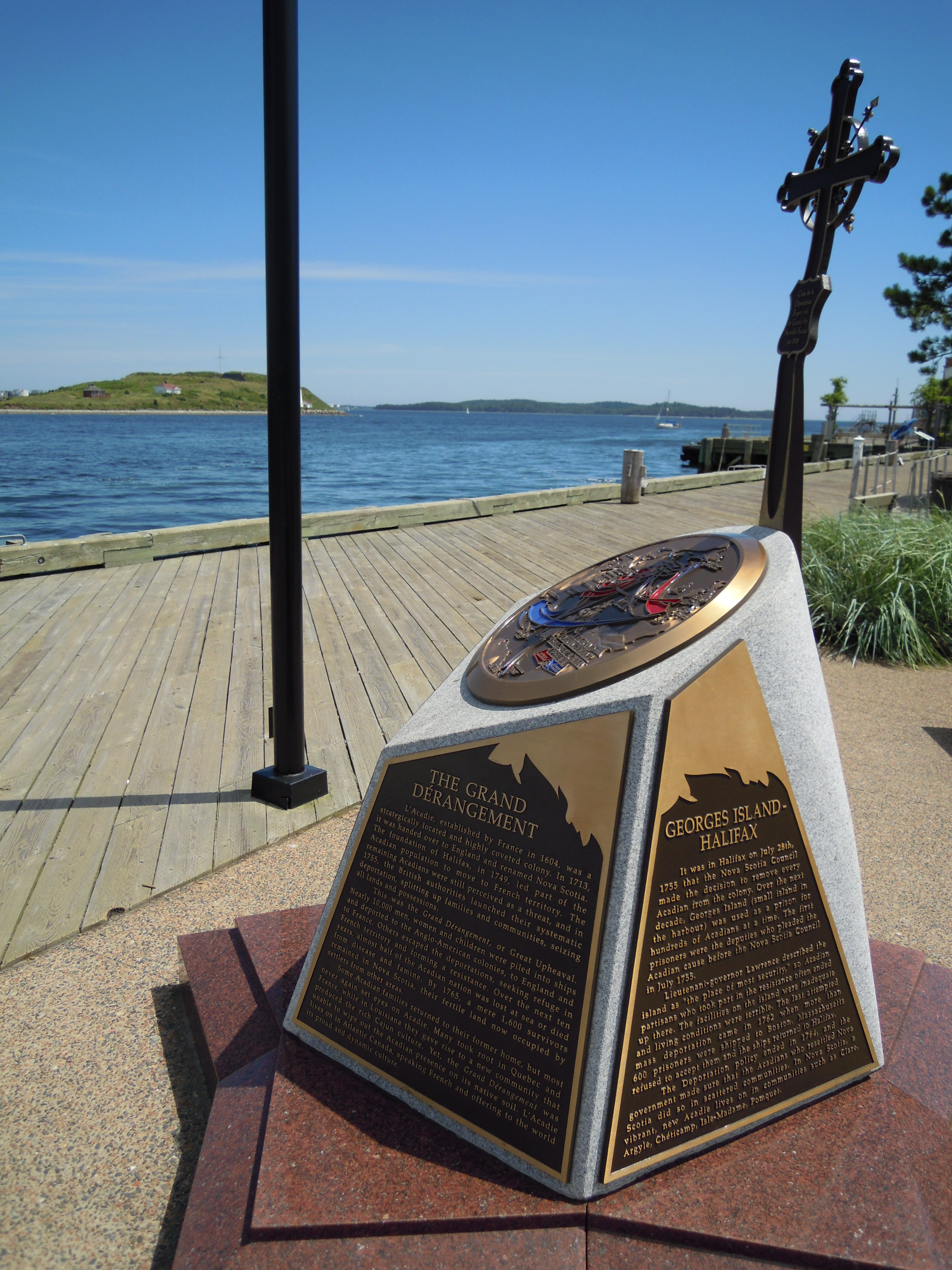
A monument to imprisoned Acadians on Georges Island (background) and Bishops Landing in Halifax

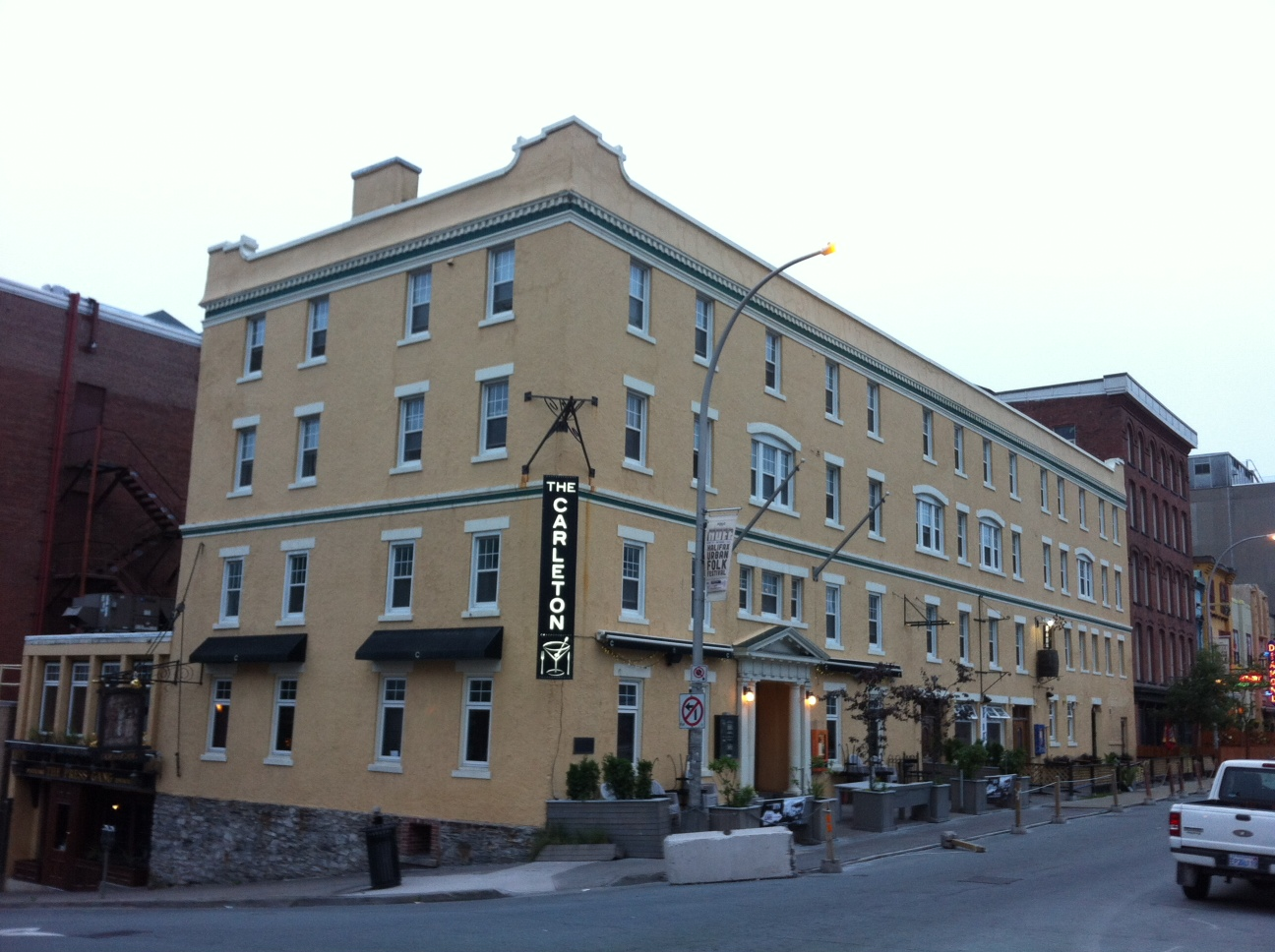
Richard Bulkeley built The Carleton in 1760, one of the oldest building structures in Halifax

On April 2, 1756, Miꞌkmaq received payment from the Governor of Quebec for twelve British scalps taken at Halifax. Acadian Pierre Gautier, son of Joseph-Nicolas Gautier, led Miꞌkmaw warriors from Louisbourg on three raids against Halifax in 1757. In each raid, Gautier took prisoners or scalps or both. The last raid happened in September and Gautier went with four Miꞌkmaq and killed and scalped two British men at the foot of Citadel Hill. (Pierre went on to participate in the Battle of Restigouche.)

By June 1757, the settlers at Lawrencetown (established 1754) had to be completely withdrawn from the settlement as the number of Mi'kmaq raids were preventing them from leaving their houses. In April 1757, a band of Acadian and Miꞌkmaq partisans raided a warehouse at nearby Fort Edward, killing thirteen British soldiers and, after taking what provisions they could carry, setting fire to the building. A few days later, the same partisans also raided Fort Cumberland. Because of the strength of the Acadian militia and Miꞌkmaw militia, British officer John Knox wrote that "In the year 1757 we were said to be Masters of the province of Nova Scotia, or Acadia, which, however, was only an imaginary possession." and that the situation in the province was so precarious for the British that the "troops and inhabitants" at Fort Edward, Fort Sackville and Lunenburg "could not be reputed in any other light than as prisoners."

The town proved its worth as a military base in the French and Indian War (the North American Theatre of the Seven Years' War) as a counter to the French Fortress of Louisbourg in Cape Breton. Halifax provided the base for the Siege of Louisbourg and operated as a major naval base for the remainder of the war. On Georges Island in the Halifax harbour, Acadians from the expulsion were imprisoned.

The most famous event to take place at the Great Pontack was on May 24, 1758, when James Wolfe, who was headquartered on Hollis Street, Halifax, threw a party at the Great Pontack prior to departing for the Siege of Louisbourg. Wolfe and his men purchased 70 bottles of Madeira wine, 50 bottles of claret and 25 bottles of brandy. Four days later, on May 29 the invasion fleet departed. Wolfe returned to his headquarters in Halifax and the Great Pontack before his Battle of the Plains of Abraham. By the end of the year the Sambro Island Lighthouse was constructed at the harbour entrance to develop the port city's merchant and naval shipping.

A permanent navy base, the Halifax Naval Yard, was established in 1759. For much of this period in the early 18th century, Nova Scotia was considered a frontier posting for the British military, given the proximity to the border with French territory and potential for conflict; the local environment was also very inhospitable and many early settlers were ill-suited for the colony's wilderness on the shores of Halifax Harbour. The original settlers, who were often discharged soldiers and sailors, left the colony for established cities such as New York and Boston or the lush plantations of the Virginia and Carolinas. However, the new city did attract New England merchants exploiting the nearby fisheries and English merchants such as Joshua Maugher who profited greatly from both British military contracts and smuggling with the French at Louisbourg. The military threat to Nova Scotia was removed following British victory over France in the Seven Years' War.

In nearby Dartmouth, in the spring of 1759, there was another Miꞌkmaq attack on Eastern Battery, in which five soldiers were killed. In July 1759, Miꞌkmaq and Acadians killed five British in Dartmouth, opposite McNabb's Island.

After the French French conquered St. John's in June 1762, both the Acadians and Mi'kmaq were galvanized by the success. They began gathering in large numbers at various points throughout Nova Scotia, behaving in a confident and, according to the British, "insolent" fashion. Officials were especially alarmed when Mi'kmaq concentrated close to the two principal towns of Nova Scotia, Halifax and Lunenburg, where there were also large groups of Acadians. The government organized an expulsion of 1,300 people, shipping them to Boston. The government of Massachusetts refused the Acadians permission to land and sent them back to Halifax.

With the addition of remaining territories of the colony of Acadia, the enlarged British colony of Nova Scotia was mostly depopulated, following the deportation of Acadian residents. In addition, Britain was unwilling to allow its residents to emigrate, this being at the dawn of their Industrial Revolution, and thus Nova Scotia invited settlement by Protestants from Europe. The region, including its new capital of Halifax, saw a modest immigration boom comprising Germans, Dutch, New Englanders, residents of Martinique and many other areas. In addition to the surnames of many present-day residents of Halifax who are descended from these settlers, an enduring name in the city is the "Dutch Village Road", which led from the "Dutch Village", located in Fairview. Dutch here referring to the German "Deutsch", which sounded like "dutch" to Haligonian ears.

For many decades Dartmouth remained largely rural, lacking direct transportation links to the growing military and commercial presence in Halifax, except for a dedicated ferry service.

==== Headquarters of the North American Station (1758-1818) ====
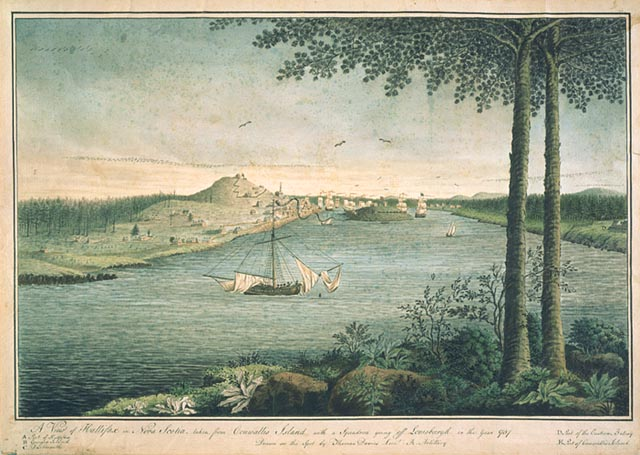
The squadron at the Louisbourg Expedition in 1757 in Halifax

Halifax was the headquarters for the British Royal Navy's North American Station for sixty years (1758–1818). Halifax Harbour had served as a Royal Navy seasonal base from the founding of the city in 1749, using temporary facilities and a careening beach on Georges Island. Land and buildings for a permanent Naval Yard were purchased in 1758 and the yard was officially commissioned in 1759. Land and buildings for a permanent Naval Yard were purchased by the Royal Naval Dockyard, Halifax in 1758 and the Yard was officially commissioned in 1759. (The yard served as the main base for the Royal Navy in North America during the Seven Years' War, the American Revolution, the French Revolutionary Wars and the War of 1812. In 1818 Halifax became the summer base for the squadron which shifted to the Royal Naval Dockyard, Bermuda for the remainder of the year.)

==== Burying the Hatchet Ceremony (1761) ====
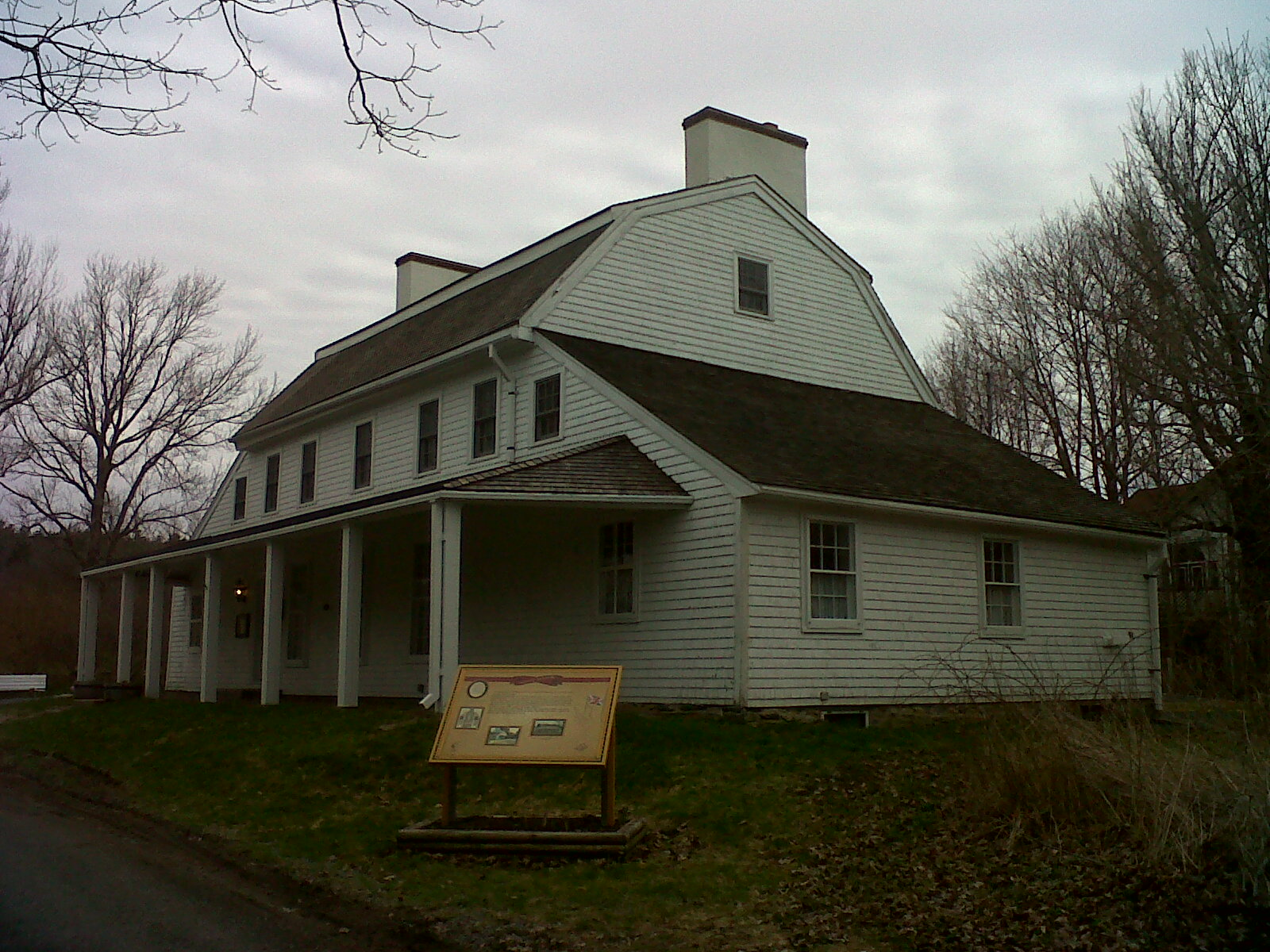
Scott Manor House, built in 1770 on the land of Captain George Scott adjacent to Fort Sackville

After agreeing to several peace treaties, the seventy-five year period of war between the British and the Mi'kmaq ended with the Burial of the Hatchet Ceremony, held on June 25, 1761, at Governor Jonathan Belcher's garden on present-day Spring Garden Road in front of the Court House. In commemoration of these treaties, Nova Scotians annually celebrate Treaty Day on October 1.

Halifax's fortunes waxed and waned with the military needs of the British Empire. While it had quickly become the largest Royal Navy base on the Atlantic coast and had hosted large numbers of British army regulars, the complete destruction of Louisbourg in 1760 removed the threat of French attack. With peace in 1763, the garrison and naval squadron was dramatically reduced. With naval vessels no longer carrying the mail, Halifax merchants banded together in 1765 to build the schooner Nova Scotia Packet, the first warship built in English Canada, to carry mail to Boston. The ship was purchased by the Royal Navy in 1768 and renamed Halifax. Meanwhile, Boston and New England turned their eyes west, to the French territory now available due to the defeat of Montcalm at the Plains of Abraham. By the mid-1770s the town was feeling its first of many peacetime slumps.

==== The American War of Independence (1775-1783) ====
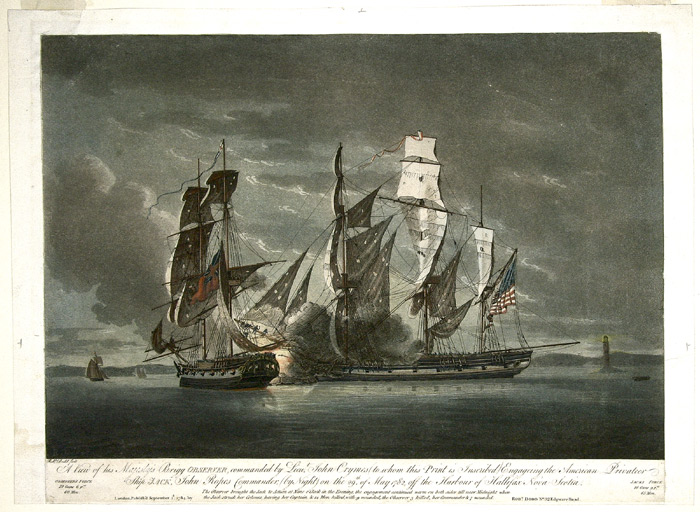
Naval battle off Halifax during the American Revolutionary War

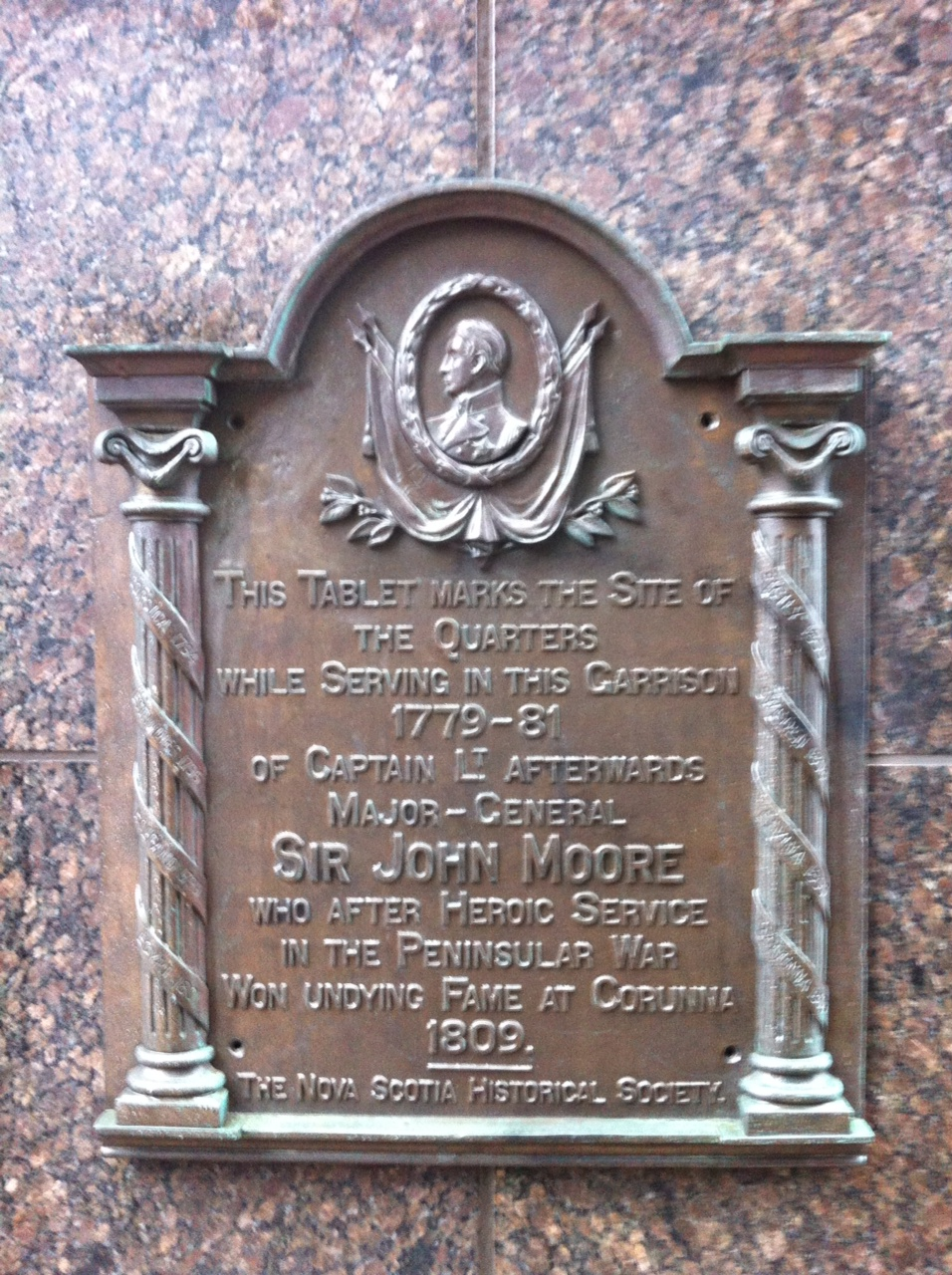
Sir John Moore in Halifax, the British Army's headquarters when Moore led the defeat of the American Penobscot Expedition

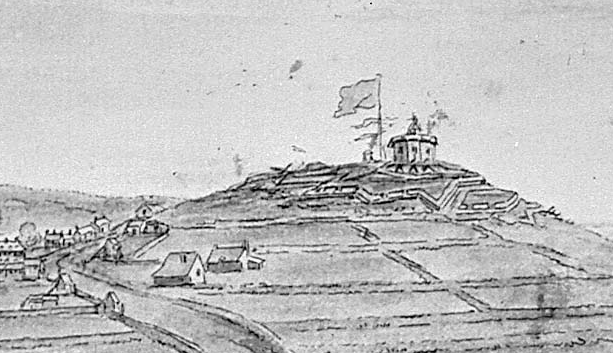
Citadel Hill during the American Revolutionary War in 1780

The American Revolutionary War was not at first uppermost in the minds of most residents of Halifax. The government did not have enough money to pay for oil for the Sambro lighthouse. The militia was unable to maintain a guard, and was disbanded. The Sugar Act, or American Revenue Act, of April 1764 was the first from the Parliament at Westminster to explicitly state that its purpose was not merely to regulate trade but to raise revenue, and, toward this end, the Act established a vice admiralty court in Halifax for the purpose of cracking down on alleged smugglers evading customs. Provisions were so scarce during the winter of 1775 that Quebec had to send flour to feed the town. While Halifax was remote from the troubles in the rest of the American colonies, martial law was declared in November 1775 to combat lawlessness.

On March 30, 1776, General William Howe arrived, having been driven from Boston by rebel forces. He brought with him 200 officers, 3,000 men, and over 4,000 loyalist refugees, and demanded housing and provisions for all. This was merely the beginning of the capital city of Halifax's role in the war. Throughout the conflict, and for a considerable time afterwards, thousands more refugees, often "in a destitute and helpless condition" had arrived in Halifax or other ports in Nova Scotia.

During the American War of Independence, Halifax became the staging point of many attacks on rebel-controlled areas in the Thirteen Colonies, and was the city to which British forces from Boston and New York were sent after the Americans retook those major cities.

==== American Loyalist refugees ====
After the War, tens of thousands of Loyalists from the United States flooded Halifax, and many of their descendants still reside in the city today. The number of Loyalist refugees peaked with the orderly evacuation of New York, and continued until well after the formal conclusion of war in 1783. Although Halifax officials expected an influx of refugees and made some preparation of their arrival, the numbers who came were far beyond the city's provisions for them. Many had been propertied members of society in the former American colonies, who arrived with very little of their material wealth.

At the instigation of the newly arrived Loyalists who desired greater local control, Britain subdivided Nova Scotia in 1784 with the creation of the colonies of New Brunswick and Cape Breton Island. This political had the effect of considerably diluting Halifax's power in the region, but it remained capital of the province and the naval station remained the base for the Royal Navy until the base was moved to Bermuda in 1818.

Nearby Dartmouth continued to develop slowly. In 1785, after the American Revolutionary War, a group of Quakers from Nantucket, Massachusetts arrived in Dartmouth to set up a whaling enterprise. They built homes, a Quaker meeting house, a wharf for their vessels and a factory to produce spermaceti candles and other products made from whale oil and carcasses. It was a profitable venture and the Quakers employed many local residents, but within ten years, around 1795, the whalers moved their operation to Wales. Only one Quaker residence remains in Dartmouth and is believed to be the oldest structure in Dartmouth. Other families soon arrived in Dartmouth, among them was the Hartshorne family. They were Loyalists who arrived in 1785, and received a grant that included land bordering present-day Portland, King and Wentworth Streets. Woodlawn was once part of the land purchased by a Loyalist, named Ebenezer Allen who became a prominent Dartmouth businessman. In 1786, he donated land near his estate to be used as a cemetery. Many early settlers are interred in the Woodlawn cemetery.

==== British Royal resident in Halifax (1794-1800) ====
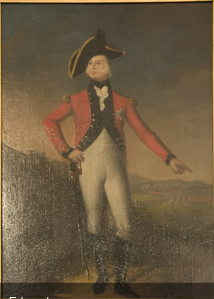
Prince Edward, Duke of Kent and Strathearn, a portrait of Prince Edward by William J. Weaver in Province House

Prince Edward, Duke of Kent and Strathearn was ordered to live in at the headquarters of the Royal Navy's North American Station in Halifax (1794–1800). He became the Commander-in-Chief, North America. He had a significant impact on the city. He was instrumental in shaping that port's military defences for protecting the important Royal Navy base, as well as influencing the city's and colony's socio-political and economic institutions. He also designed the Prince of Wales Tower, the Halifax Town Clock on Citadel Hill (Fort George), St Georges (Round) Church, Princes Lodge (only the round music room remains) and others. The Prince and his mistress, Madame de Saint-Laurent, lived at Prince's Lodge for the six years they stationed in Halifax. (The Duke visited Kings County, Nova Scotia in 1794. As a result, in 1826, the inhabitants of the county voted to name their town Kentville after him). While in Halifax he was promoted to lieutenant-general in January 1796.

Not until after suffering a fall from his horse in late 1798 was he allowed to return to England. On April 24, 1799, he was created Duke of Kent and Strathearn and Earl of Dublin, received the thanks of parliament and an income of £12,000 and was later, in May, promoted to the rank of general and appointed Commander-in-Chief of British forces in North America. He took leave of his parents on July 22, 1799 and sailed to Halifax. Just over twelve months later he left Halifax and arrived in England on August 31, 1800 where it was expected his next appointment would be Lord Lieutenant of Ireland.

== 19th century ==
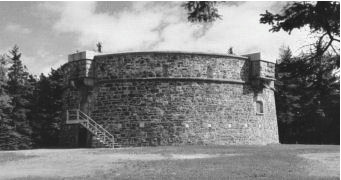
Prince of Wales Tower, built in 1796 in Point Pleasant Park in Halifax, is the oldest Martello Tower in North America

By the early 19th century, Dartmouth consisted of about twenty-five families. Within twenty years, there were sixty houses, a church, gristmill, shipyards, sawmill, two inns and a bakery located near the harbour.

=== Napoleonic Wars ===
Halifax was now the bastion of British strength on the East Coast of North America. Local merchants also took advantage of the exclusion of American trade to the British colonies in the Caribbean, beginning a long trade relationship with the West Indies. However, the most significant growth began with the beginning of what would become known as the Napoleonic Wars. Military spending and the opportunities of wartime shipping and trading stimulated growth led by local merchants such as Charles Ramage Prescott and Enos Collins.

By 1796, Prince Edward, Duke of Kent, was sent to take command of Nova Scotia. Many of the city's forts were designed by him, and he left an indelible mark on the city in the form of many public buildings of Georgian architecture, and a dignified British feel to the city itself. It was during this time that Halifax truly became a city. Many landmarks and institutions were built during his tenure, from the Town Clock on Citadel Hill to St. George's Round Church, fortifications in the Halifax Defence Complex were built up, businesses established, and the population boomed. At the same time, the towns people and especially seafarers were constantly on-guard of the press gangs of the Royal Navy.

=== Halifax Impressment Riot (1805) ===
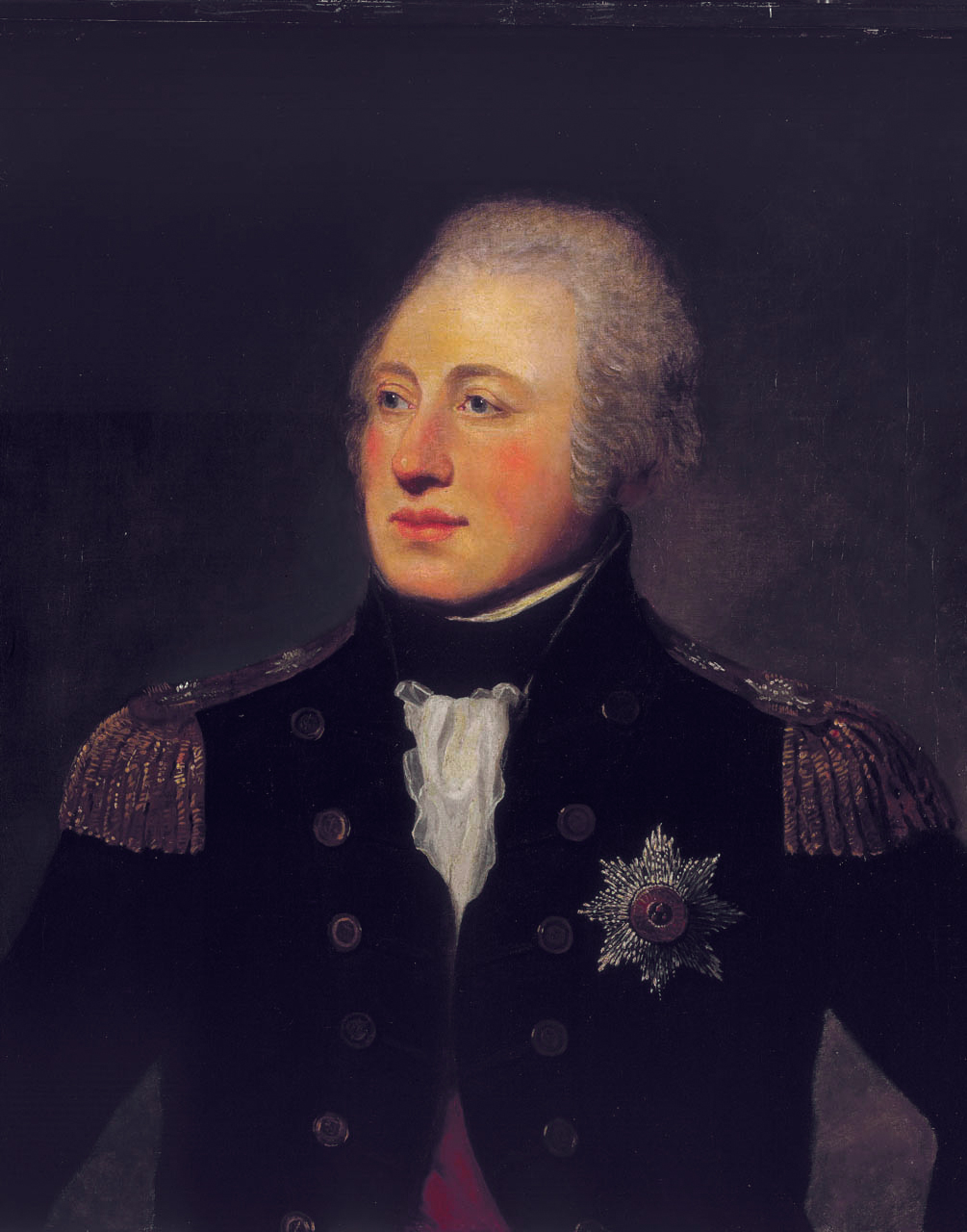
Vice Admiral Andrew Mitchell ordered HMS Cleopatra press gang to Halifax

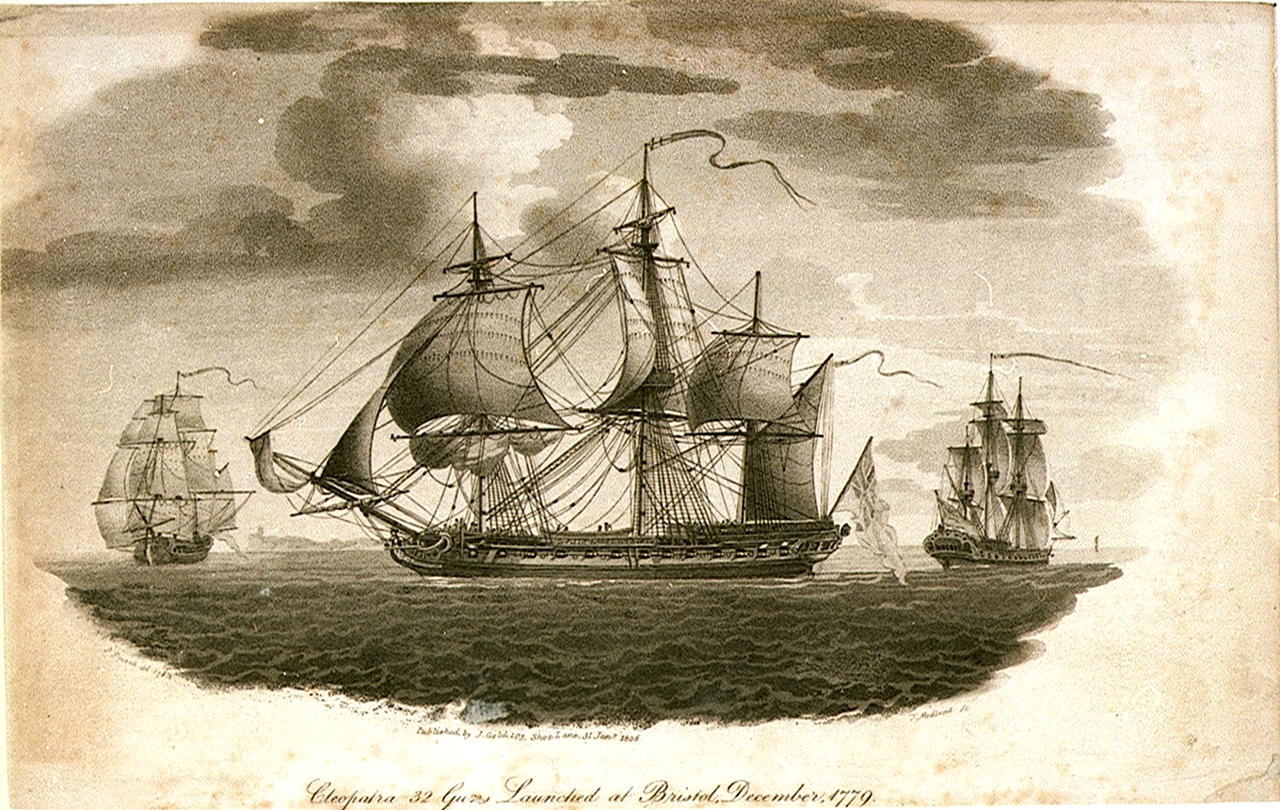
Press gang from HMS Cleopatra, which started the Halifax Riot in 1805, depicted by Nicholas Pocock

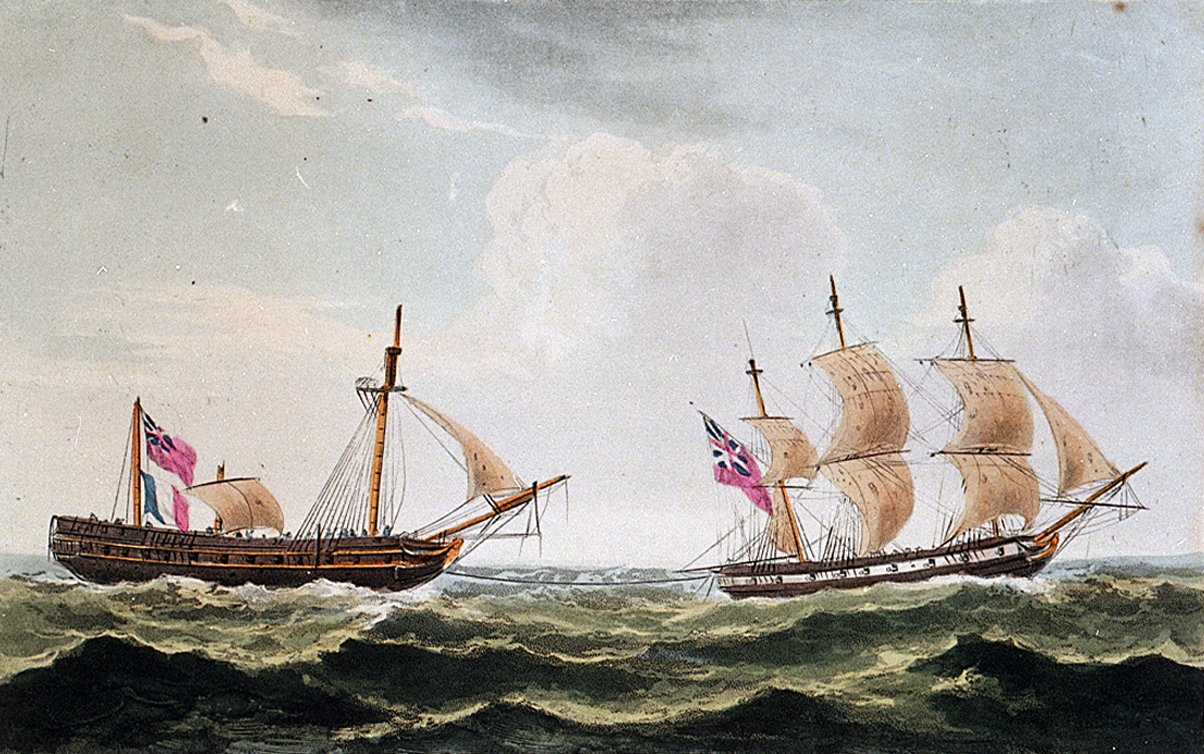
The captured Furieuse was taken in tow to Halifax by HMS Bonne Citoyenne on 6 August 1809

The Royal Navy's manning problems in Nova Scotia peaked in 1805. Warships were short-handed from high desertion rates, and naval captains were handicapped in filling those vacancies by provincial impressment regulations. Desperate for sailors, the Royal Navy pressed them all over the North Atlantic region in 1805, from Halifax and Charlottetown to Saint John and Quebec City. In early May, Vice Admiral Andrew Mitchell sent press gangs from several warships into downtown Halifax. They conscripted men first and asked questions later, rounding up dozens of potential recruits.

The breaking point came in October 1805, when Vice Admiral Mitchell allowed press gangs from HMS Cleopatra to storm the streets of Halifax armed with bayonets, sparking a major riot in which one man was killed and several others were injured. Wentworth lashed out at the admiral for sparking urban unrest and breaking provincial impressment laws, and his government exploited this violent episode to put even tighter restrictions of recruiting in Nova Scotia.

Stemming from impressment disturbances, civil-naval relations deteriorated in Nova Scotia from 1805 to the War of 1812. HMS Whiting was in Liverpool for only about a week, but it terrified the small town the entire time and naval impressment remained a serious threat to sailors along the South Shore. After leaving Liverpool, Whiting terrorized Shelburne by pressing inhabitants, breaking into homes, and forcing more than a dozen families to live in the forest to avoid further harassment.

=== War of 1812 (1812-1815) ===
Though the Duke left in 1800, the city's prosperity continued to grow throughout the Napoleonic Wars and the War of 1812. While the Royal Navy squadron based in Halifax was small at the beginning of the Napoleonic Wars, it grew to a large size by the War of 1812, fought between the United States and Great Britain, and ensured that Halifax was never attacked. The Naval Yard in Halifax expanded to become a major base for the Royal Navy and while its main task was supply and refit, it also built several smaller warships including the namesake HMS Halifax in 1806.

=== Capture of U.S.S. Chesapeake ===
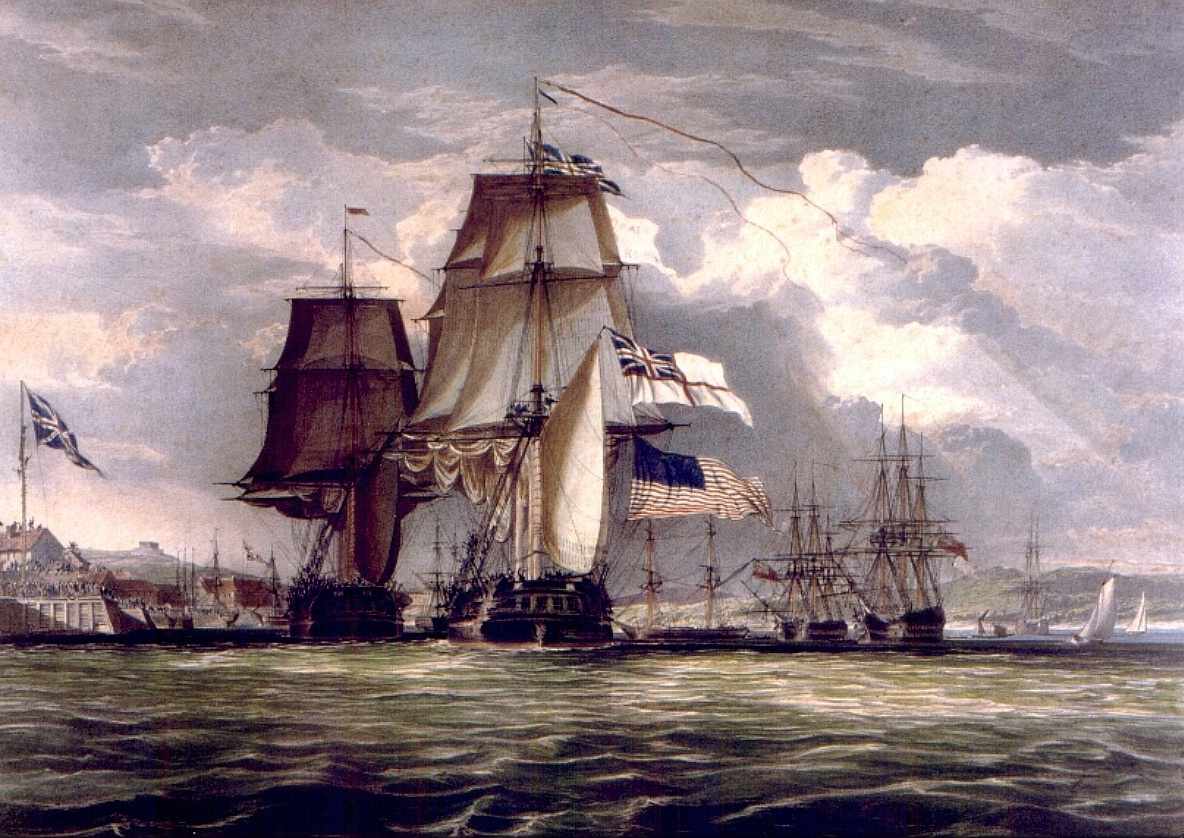
HMS Shannon leads the captured USS Chesapeake into Halifax

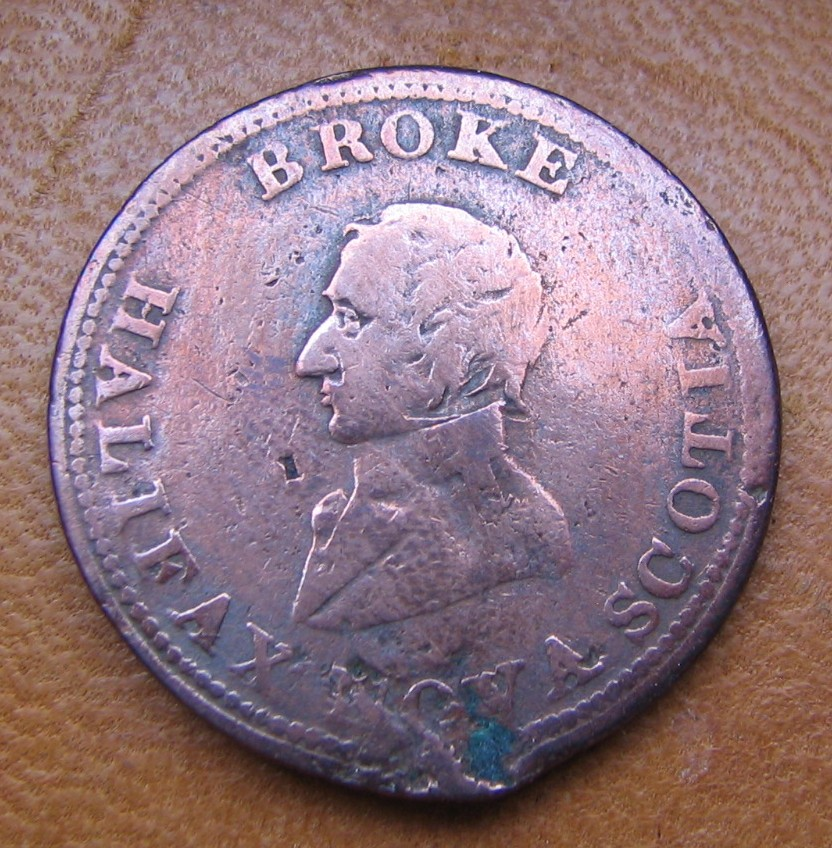
A Halifax coin struck after Captain Philip Broke's capture of the USS Chesapeake

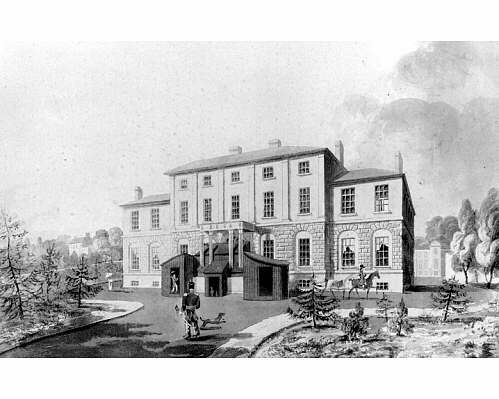
The new Government House, built in 1819

Several notable naval engagements occurred off the Halifax station. Most dramatic was the victory of the Halifax-based British frigate HMS Shannon which captured the American frigate USS Chesapeake and brought her to Halifax as prize. As the first major victory in the naval war for the British, the capture raised the shaken morale of the Royal Navy. Two-thirds of the men that followed British Captain Philip Broke in the boarding party were wounded or killed. The casualties, 228 dead or wounded between the two ships' companies, were high, with the ratio making it one of the bloodiest single ship actions of the Age of Sail. It had the single highest body count in an action between two ships in the entirety of the war. By comparison, HMS Victory suffered fewer casualties during the much longer Battle of Trafalgar.

Shannon, commanded by Halifax's own Provo Wallis, escorted Chesapeake into Halifax, arriving there on June 6. On the entry of the two frigates into the harbour, the naval ships already at anchor manned their yards, bands played martial music and each ship Shannon passed greeted her with cheers. The 320 American survivors of the battle were interned on Meville Island in 1813, and many later buried at nearby Deadman's Island. The American ship, renamed HMS Chesapeake, was used to ferry prisoners from Melville to England's Dartmoor Prison. Many American officers were paroled to Halifax, but some began a riot at a performance of a patriotic song about Chesapeake's defeat. Parole restrictions were tightened: beginning in 1814, paroled officers were required to attend a monthly muster on Melville Island, and those who violated their parole were confined to the prison.

An invasion force sent from Halifax attacked Washington D.C. in 1813 in the Burning of Washington, setting the U.S. Capitol and White House ablaze. The leader of the force was Robert Ross, who died in the battle and was buried in Halifax.

Early in the war, an expedition left Halifax under the Lieutenant Governor of Nova Scotia, John Coape Sherbrooke, to captured Maine. They renamed the new colony New Ireland, which the British held for the entirety of the war. The revenues which were taken from this conquest were used after the war to finance a military library in Halifax and to found Dalhousie University which is today Atlantic Canada's largest university. There remains a street on campus called Castine Way, named after Castine, Maine. The city also thrived in the War of 1812 on the large numbers of captured American ships and cargoes captured by the British navy and provincial privateers. The wartime boom peaked in 1814. Present day government landmarks such as Government House, built to house the governor, and Province House, built to house the House of Assembly, were both built during the city's peak of prosperity at the end of the War of 1812.

Saint Mary's University was founded in 1802, originally as an elementary school. Saint Mary's was upgraded to a college following the establishment of Dalhousie University in 1819; both were initially located in the downtown central business district before relocating to the then-outskirts of the city in the south end near the Northwest Arm. Separated by only few minutes walking distance, the two schools now enjoy a friendly rivalry.

=== Black refugees ===
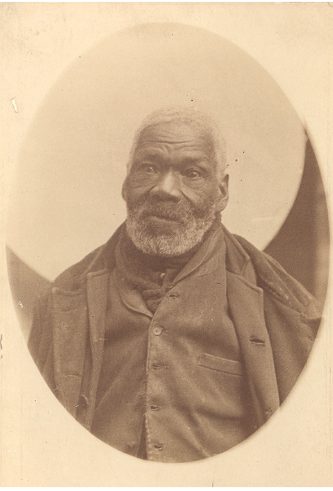
Gabriel Hall, the only known image of a Black refugee from the War of 1812

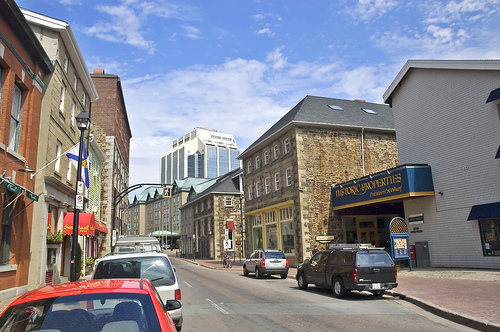
Historic Properties in Halifax

The next major migration of blacks into Nova Scotia occurred between 1813 and 1815. Black Refugees from the United States settled in many parts of Nova Scotia including Hammonds Plains, Beechville, Lucasville and Africville.

=== 19th century prosperity ===
In the peace after 1815, the city at first suffered an economic malaise for a few years, aggravated by the move of the Royal Naval yard to Bermuda in 1818. However the economy recovered in the next decade led by a very successful local merchant class. Powerful local entrepreneurs included steamship pioneer Samuel Cunard and the banker Enos Collins. During the 19th century Halifax became the birthplace of two of Canada's largest banks; local financial institutions included the Halifax Banking Company, Union Bank of Halifax, People's Bank of Halifax, Bank of Nova Scotia, and the Merchants' Bank of Halifax, making the city one of the most important financial centres in colonial British North America and later Canada until the beginning of the 20th century. This position was somewhat rivalled by neighboring Saint John, New Brunswick during the city's economic hey-day in the mid-19th century. Halifax was incorporated as the City of Halifax in 1841.

Throughout the nineteenth century, there were numerous businesses that were developed in HRM that became of national and international importance: The Starr Manufacturing Company, the Cunard Line, Alexander Keith's Brewery, Morse's Tea Company, among others. A modern water works system was built in 1844 to replace the city's original array of private and public wells. The Halifax Water Company, a private firm under contract to the City of Halifax built a gravity-fed main to deliver water to fire hydrants, public fountains and private customers in downtown Halifax from the Chain Lakes and Long Lake system near the city. It went into full operation in 1848 and was purchased by the City from the private company in 1861.

Having played a key role to maintain and expand British power in North America and elsewhere during the 18th century, Halifax played less dramatic roles in the many decades of peace during the 19th century. However, as one of the most important British overseas bases, the harbor's defenses were successively refortified with the latest artillery defences throughout the century to provide a secure base for British Empire forces. Nova Scotians and Maritimers were recruited through Halifax for the Crimean War. The city boomed during the American Civil War, mostly by supplying the wartime economy of the North but also by offering refuge and supplies to Confederate blockade runners. The port also saw Canada's first overseas military deployment as a nation to aid the British Empire during the Second Boer War.

Halifax was founded below a drumlin that would later be named Citadel Hill. The outpost was named in honour of George Montague-Dunk, 2nd Earl of Halifax, who was the President of the Board of Trade. Halifax was ideal for a military base, with the vast Halifax Harbour, among the largest natural harbours in the world, which could be well protected with artillery battery at McNab's Island, the Northwest Arm, Point Pleasant, George's Island and York Redoubt. In its early years, Citadel Hill was used as a command and observation post, before changes in artillery that could range out into the harbour.

=== Royal Acadian School ===
In 1814, Walter Bromley opened the Royal Acadian School, which included many black children and adults. Bromley taught on the weekends because they were employed during the week. Some of the black students entered into business in Halifax while others were hired as servants.

=== New Horizons Baptist Church ===
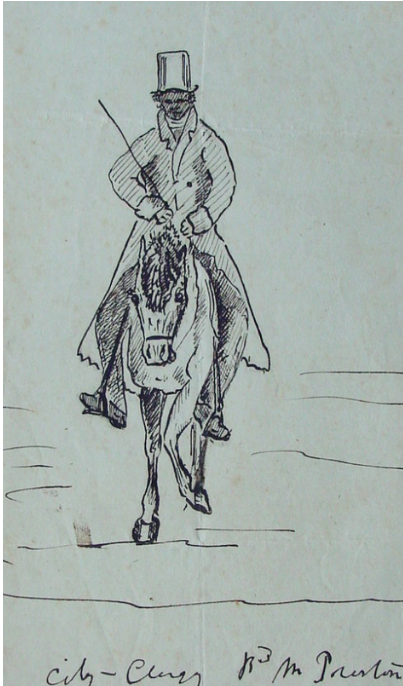
Richard Preston, founder of the first black church in Nova Scotia in 1832

New Horizons Baptist Church (formerly known as the African Chapel and the African Baptist Church) is a Baptist church in Halifax, Nova Scotia that was established by Black Refugees in 1832. When the chapel was completed, black citizens of Halifax were reported to be proud of this accomplishment because it was evidence that former slaves could establish their own institutions in Nova Scotia. Under the direction of Richard Preston, the church laid the foundation for social action to address the plight of Black Nova Scotians.

Preston and others went on to establish a network of socially active Black baptist churches throughout Nova Scotia, with the Halifax church being referred to as the "Mother Church." Five of these churches were established in Halifax: Preston (1842), Beechville (1844), Hammonds Plains (1845), and another in Africville (1849) and Dartmouth. From meetings held at the church, they also established the African Friendly Society, the African Abolition Society, and the African United Baptist Association.

The church remained the centre of social activism throughout the 20th Century. Reverends at the church included William A. White (1919-1936) and William Pearly Oliver (1937-1962).

=== City status ===
After a protracted struggle between residents and the Viceroys of Nova Scotia, the City of Halifax was incorporated in 1842.

=== Responsible government ===
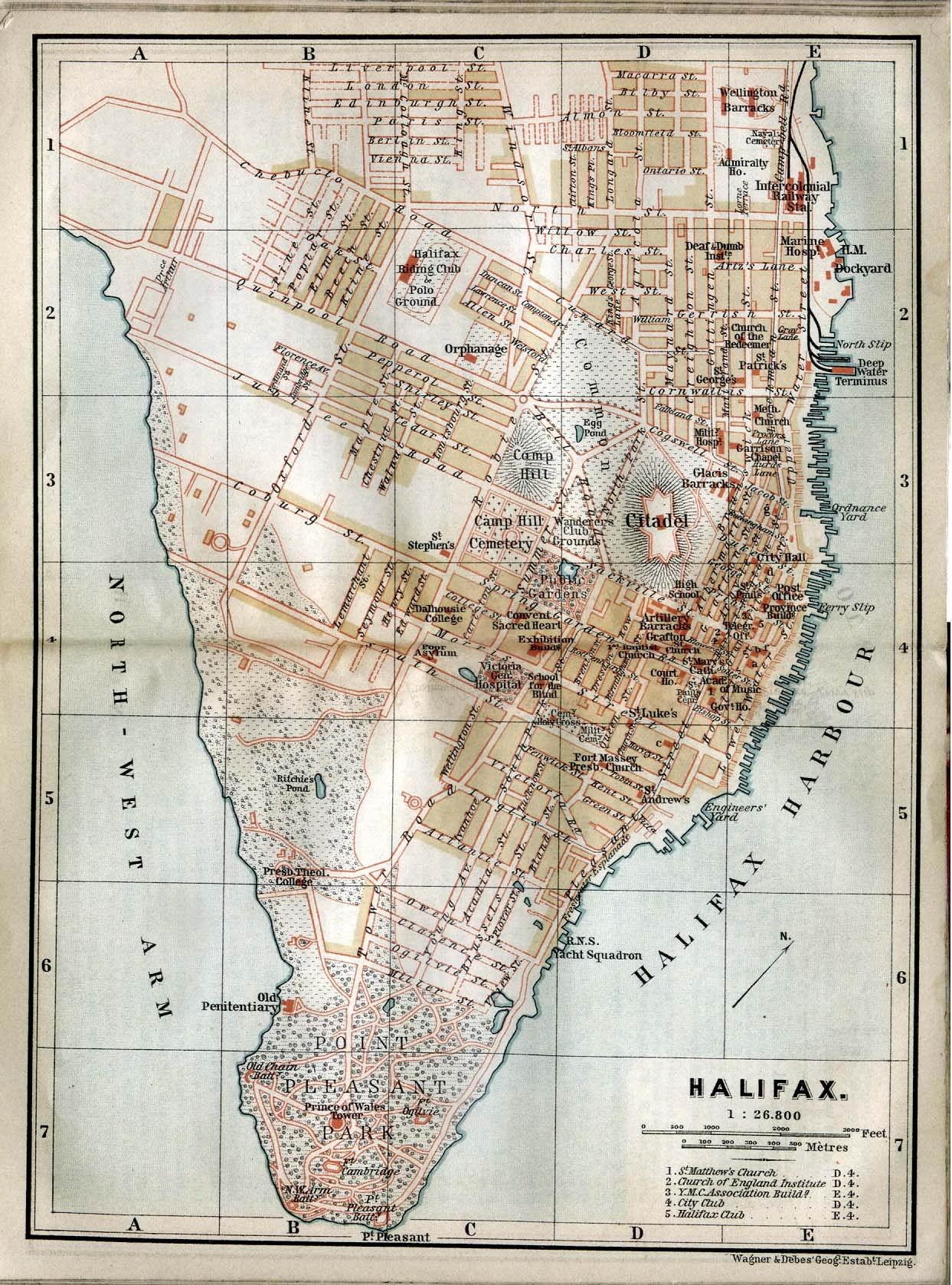
An 1894 map of Halifax

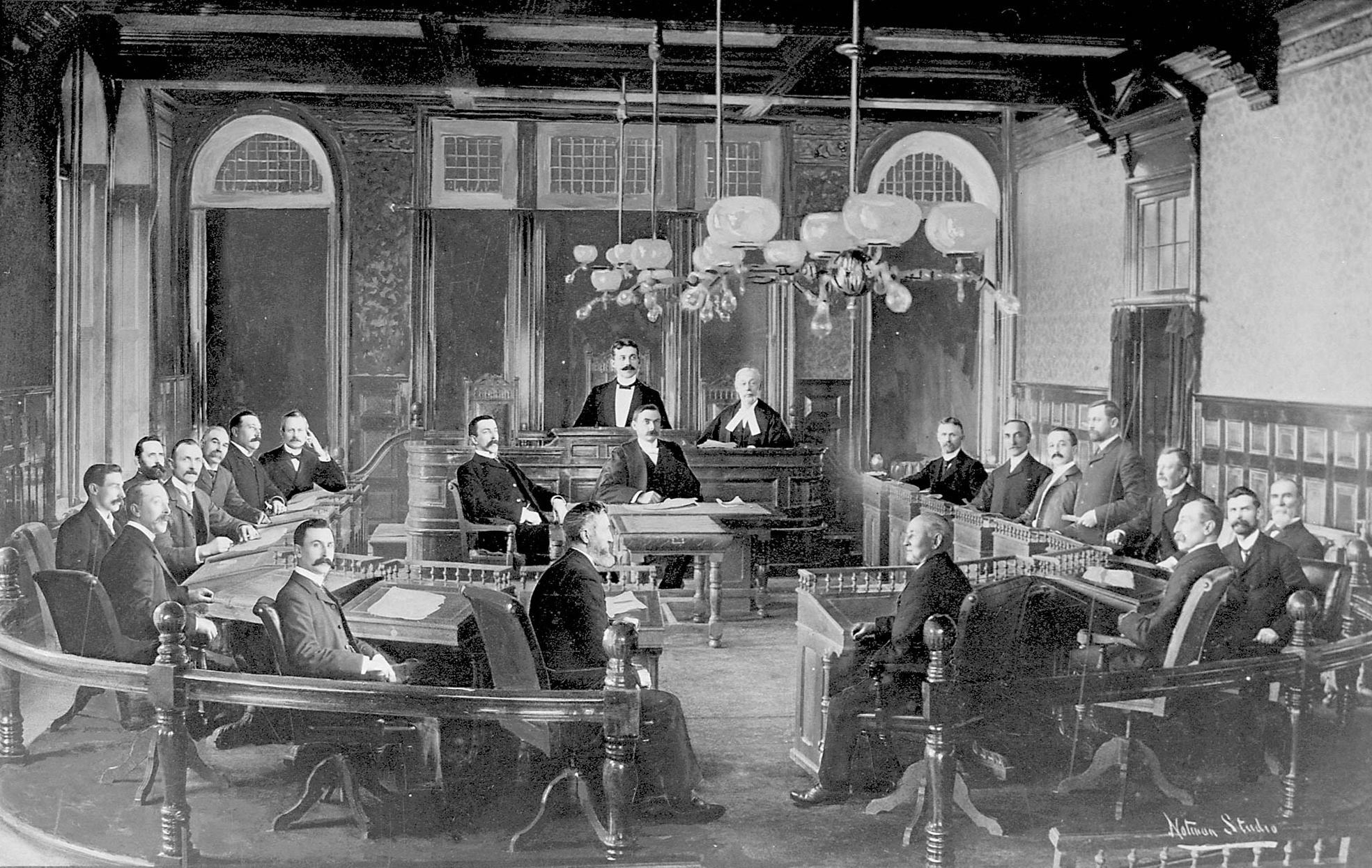
Halifax City Council in 1903

The cause of self-government for the city of Halifax began the political career of Joseph Howe and would subsequently lead to this form of accountability being brought to colonial affairs for the colony of Nova Scotia. Howe was later considered a great Nova Scotian leader, and the father of responsible government in British North America. After election to the House of Assembly as leader of the Liberal party, one of his first acts was the incorporation of the City of Halifax in 1842, followed by the direct election of civic politicians by Haligonians.

Halifax became a hotbed of political activism as the winds of responsible government swept British North America during the 1840s, following the rebellions against oligarchies in the colonies of Upper and Lower Canada. The first instance of responsible government in the British Empire was achieved by the colony of Nova Scotia in January–February 1848 through the efforts of Howe. The leaders of the fight for responsible or self-government later took up the Anti-Confederation fight, the movement that from 1868 to 1875 tried to take Nova Scotia out of Confederation.

During the 1850s, Howe was a heavy promoter of railway technology, having been a key instigator in the founding of the Nova Scotia Railway, which ran from Richmond in the city's north end to the Minas Basin at Windsor and to Truro and on to Pictou on the Northumberland Strait. In the 1870s Halifax became linked by rail to Moncton and Saint John, New Brunswick through the Intercolonial Railway and on into Quebec and New England, not to mention numerous rural areas in Nova Scotia.

=== Crimean War (1853-1856) ===
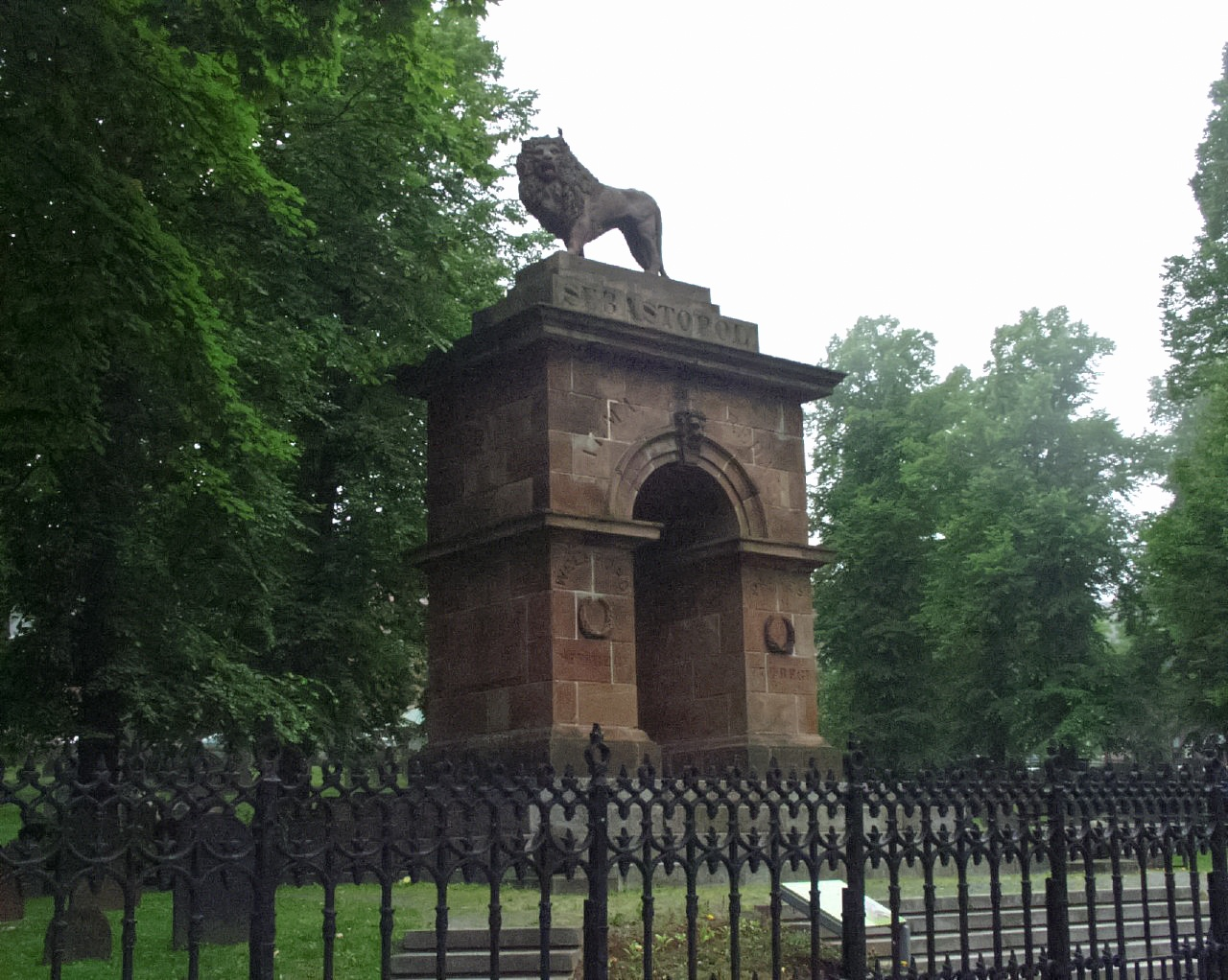
Welsford-Parker Monument in Halifax, the only Crimean War monument in North America

Citizens of the former City of Halifax fought in the Crimean War. The Welsford-Parker Monument in Halifax is the oldest war monument in Canada (1860) and the only Crimean War monument in North America. It commemorates the Siege of Sevastopol (1854–1855).

Located at the mouth of the Sackville River, Bedford was originally known by several names, such as Fort Sackville, Ten Mile House, and Sunnyside. It used the name Bedford Basin (named after the Bedford Basin) from 1856 to 1902, when it was shortened to just Bedford, taking its name from the Duke of Bedford who was the Secretary of State in 1749.

Dartmouth saw a surge of local industries in the 1850s. The Dartmouth Marine Slips opened in 1858 just in time to benefit from the surge in shipping during the American Civil War. Nearby, the Starr Manufacturing Company was built near the Shubenacadie Canal in the late 1850s. The factory employed over 150 workers and manufactured ice skates, cut nails, vault doors, iron bridge work and other heavy iron products. The Mott's candy and soap factory, employing 100, opened at Hazelhurst (near present-day Hazelhurst and Newcastle Streets). The Symonds Foundry employed a further 50 to 100 people. The Stairs Ropeworks, later Consumer Cordage, was built in the North End of Dartmouth on Wyse Road, constructing an industrial suburb for its 300 workers and surviving the Halifax Explosion. The ropeworks survived as a pub until 2012 when it was demolished by Sobeys to construct a supermarket. As the population grew, more houses were erected and new businesses established. Subdivisions such as Woodlawn, Woodside and Westphal developed on the outskirts of the town.

=== Military schools ===
Long before the Royal Military College of Canada was established in 1876, there were proposals for military colleges in Canada. At a pre-Confederation of Canada military school in Halifax, adult male students drilled and attended lectures on drill commands, military records, court-martial, the Articles of War, discipline and punishments, promotion of non-commissioned officers, military accounts and pay and messing. After Confederation, a military school was opened in Halifax to conduct officer training for cavalry, infantry and artillery. In 1870–71, Canadian militia staff replaced the British regulars who were recalled from overseas station.

=== Schools for the Deaf and the Blind established ===
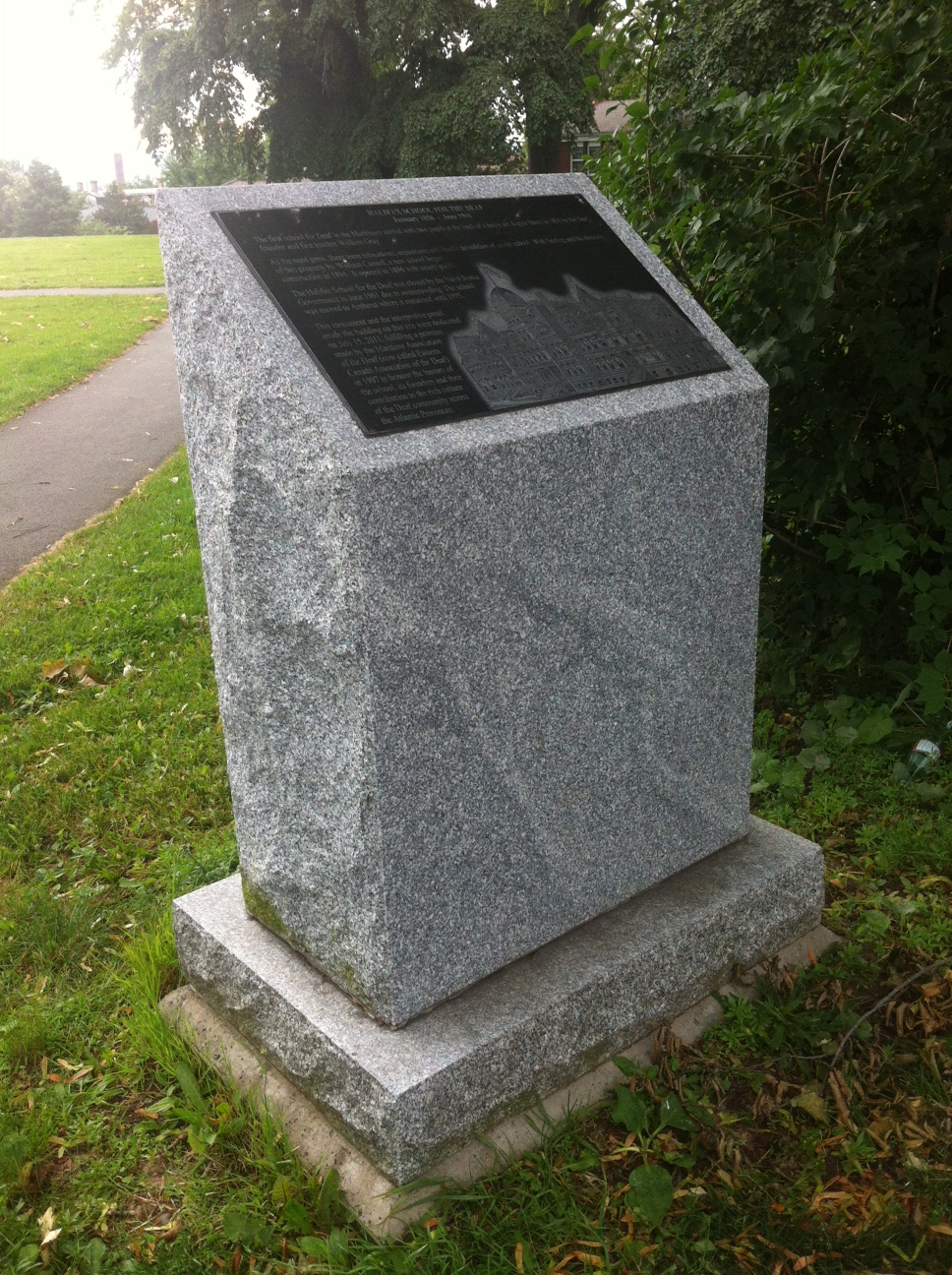
Halifax School for the Deaf on Göttingen Street in Halifax

The first school for the deaf in Atlantic Canada, the Halifax School for the Deaf, was established on Göttingen Street, Halifax (1856). The Halifax School for the Blind was opened on Morris Street in 1871. It was the first residential school for the blind in Canada.

=== American Civil War (1861-1865) ===
The American Civil War again saw much activity and prosperity in Halifax. Due to longstanding economic and social connections to New England as well as the Abolition movement, a majority of the population supported the North and many volunteered to fight in the Union Army. However, parts of the city's merchant class, especially those trading in the West Indies, supported the Confederates. A few merchants in the city made huge profits selling supplies and sometimes arms to both sides of the conflict (see for example Alexander Keith, Jr.). Blockade runner carrying supplies and arms and destined for Confederate ports along with Confederate ships often called on the port to take on supplies, and make repairs. Halifax played a significant role in the Chesapeake Affair. Another Confederate ship, CSS Tallahassee, became a notable in Halifax when she made a midnight escape through from Union warships believed waiting at the harbour entrance. The role in the Confederate blockade running in the city was so significant that U.S. Secretary of State William H. Seward complained on March 14, 1865:

Halifax has been for more than one year, and yet is, a naval station for vessels which, running the blockade, furnish supplies and munitions of war to our enemy, and it has been made a rendezvous for those piratical cruisers which come out from Liverpool and Glasgow, to destroy our commerce on the high seas, and even to carry war into the ports of the United States. Halifax is a postal and despatch station in the correspondence between the rebels at Richmond and their emissaries in Europe. Halifax merchants are known to have surreptitiously imported provisions, arms, and ammunition from our seaports, and then transshipped them to the rebels. The governor of Nova Scotia has been neutral, just, and friendly; so were the judges of the province who presided on the trial of the Chesapeake. But then it is understood that, on the other hand, merchant shippers of Halifax, and many of the people of Halifax, are willing agents and abettors of the enemies of the United States, and their hostility has proved not merely offensive but deeply injurious.

=== The Tallahassee Escape ===
Just before arriving in Halifax, the Confederate ship CSS Tallahassee made a 19-day raid off the Atlantic coast. Tallahassee destroyed 26 vessels and captured 7 others that were bonded or released. Under the command of John Taylor Wood sailed into Halifax Harbour for supplies, coal and to make repairs to her mainmast. Wood began loading coal at Woodside, on the Dartmouth shore. Two Union Navy ships were closing in on Tallahassee, USS Nansemont and USS Huron. While Wood was offered an escort out of the harbour he instead slipped out of the harbour under the cover of night by going through the seldom used Eastern Passage between McNab's Island and the Dartmouth Shore. The channel was narrow and crooked with a shallow tide so Wood hired the local pilot Jock Flemming. Tallahassee left the Woodside wharf at night in darkness. All the lights were out, but the residents on the Eastern Passage mainland could see the dark hull moving through the water, successfully evading capture.

=== Canadian Confederation ===
After the American Civil War, the five colonies which made up British North America, Ontario, Quebec, Prince Edward Island, Nova Scotia and New Brunswick, held meetings to consider uniting into a single country. This was due to a threat of annexation and invasion from the United States. Canadian Confederation became a reality in 1867, but received much resistance from the merchant classes of Halifax, and from many prominent Halifax politicians due to the fact that both Halifax and Nova Scotia were at the time very wealthy, held trading ties with Boston and New York which would be damaged, and did not see the need for the colony to give up its comparative independence. After confederation Halifax retained its British military garrison until British troops were replaced by the Canadian army in 1906. The British Royal Navy remained until 1910 when the newly created Royal Canadian Navy took over the Naval Dockyard.

The city's cultural roots deepened as its economy matured. The Victorian College of Art was founded in 1887 (later to become the Nova Scotia College of Art and Design.) Local artist John O'Brien excelled at portraits of the city's ships, yacht races and seascapes. The province's Public Archives and the provincial museum were founded in this period (first called the Mechanic's Institute, later the Nova Scotia Museum.)

==== Post Confederation ====
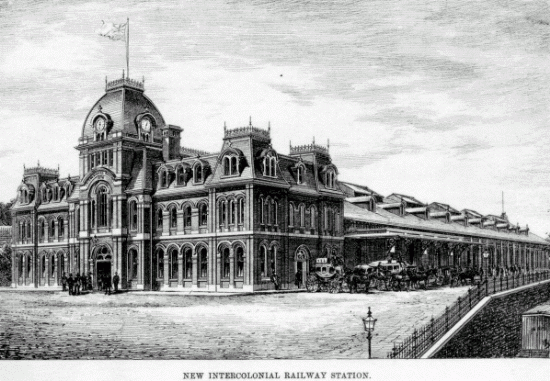
The Intercolonial Railway's North Street Station in 1878

After Confederation, boosters of Halifax expected federal help to make the city's natural harbor Canada's official winter port and a gateway for trade with Europe. Halifax's advantages included its location just off the Great Circle route made it the closest to Europe of any mainland North American port. But the new Intercolonial Railway (ICR) took an indirect, northerly route for military and political reasons. Although the ICR did build a large new station and some port facilities known as the Deep Water Terminals in Halifax's North End, the national government made little effort to promote Halifax as Canada's winter port. Ignoring appeals to nationalism and the ICR's own attempts to promote traffic to Halifax, most Canadian exporters sent their wares by train though Boston or Portland. Port promoters fought an uphill battle for decades to finance the large-scale port facilities that Halifax needed. It took the First World War to at last boost Halifax's harbor into prominence on the North Atlantic.

==== Industrialization ====
Halifax business leaders attempted to diversity with manufacturing under Canada's National Policy creating factories such as the Acadia Sugar Refinery, the Nova Scotia Cotton Manufacturing Company, the Halifax Graving Dock and the Silliker Car Works. However, this embrace with industrialization produced only modest results as most Halifax manufacturers found it hard to compete with larger firms in Ontario and Quebec.

==== Transportation links to Dartmouth ====
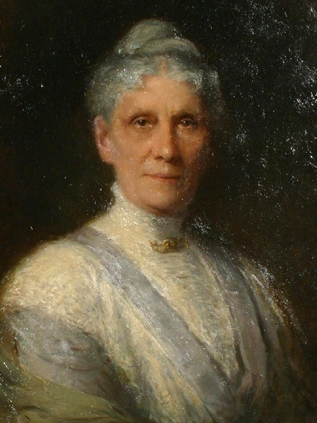
Anna Leonowens

In 1873 Dartmouth was incorporated as a town and a Town Hall was established in 1877. In 1883 The Dartmouth Times began publishing. In 1885 a railway station was built, and the first passenger service starts in 1886 with branch lines running to Windsor Junction by 1896 and the Eastern Shore by 1904. Two attempts were made to bridge The Narrows of Halifax Harbour with a railway line during the 1880s but were washed away by powerful storms. These attempts were abandoned after the line to Windsor Junction was completed. The line running through Dartmouth was envisioned to continue along the Eastern Shore to Canso or Guysborough, however developers built it inland along the Musquodoboit River at Musquodoboit Harbour and it ended in the Musquodoboit Valley farming settlement of Upper Musquodoboit, ending Dartmouth's vision of becoming a railway hub.

==== Salvation Army ====
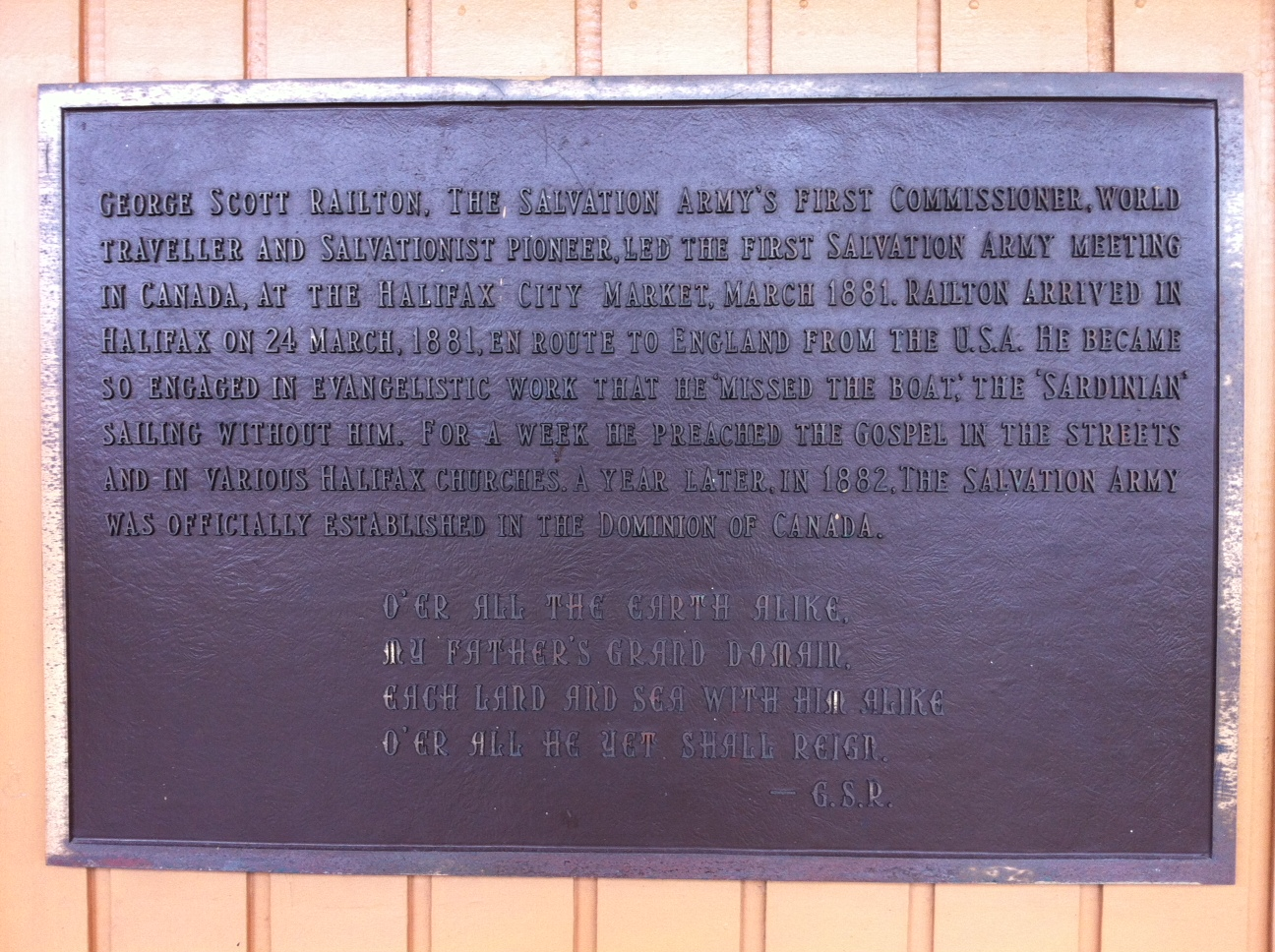
The first Salvation Army meeting in Canada

En route to England, George Scott Railton stopped at the port of Halifax, Nova Scotia and held the first Salvation Army meeting in Canada on March 24, 1881. He was so engaged in his sermon he missed his boat to England. He preached in Halifax for the following week in various Halifax churches and a year later the Salvation Army was officially established in Canada.

==== Anna Leonowens ====
Anna Leonowens lived in Halifax for 19 years (1878-1897) and had a significant cultural and social impact on the city. Her daughter Avis Annie Crawford Connybeare married Thomas Fyshe, the cashier (general manager) of the Bank of Nova Scotia in Halifax. She was a stanch supporter of women's education, organizing and serving as librarian for the Pioneer Book Club and her Shakespeare Club for young women. She was also one of the founders of the Local Council of Women of Halifax and the Woman's Suffrage Association, both of which advocated for the right for women to vote. She also was a founder of the Nova Scotia College of Art and Design. After nineteen years, her daughter and family moved to Montreal, Quebec, Leonowens followed her there.

==== North-West Rebellion (1885) ====
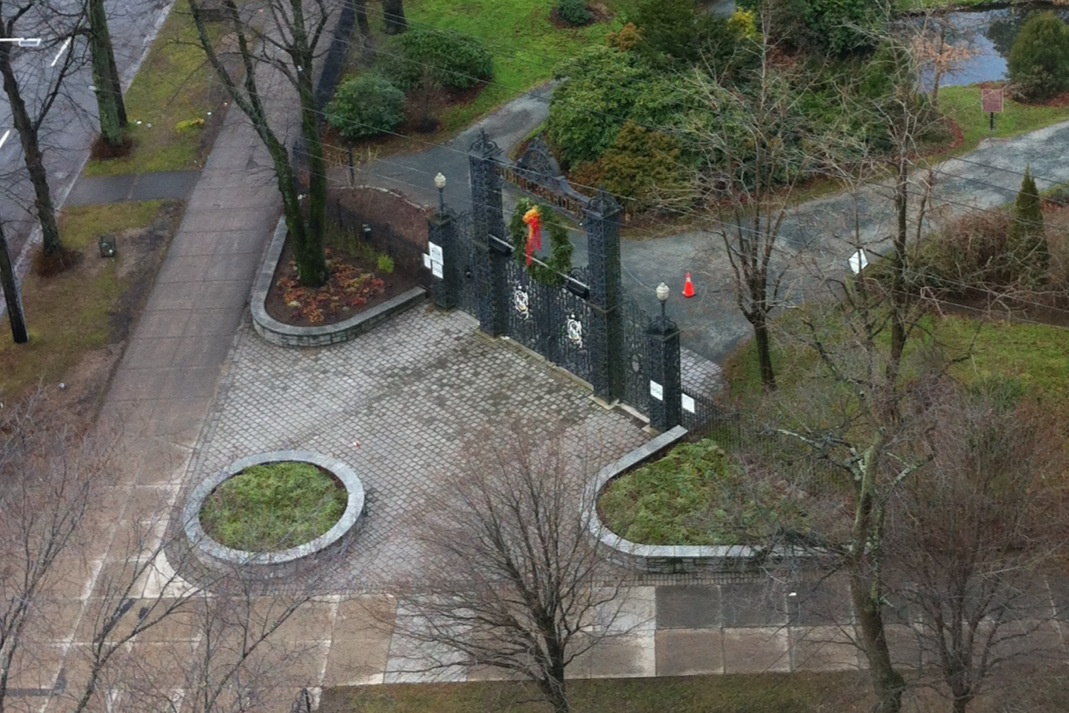
Halifax Public Gardens featuring wrought-iron gates erected in honour of the Halifax Provisional Battalion of 1907

Prior to Nova Scotia's involvement in the North-West Rebellion, Canada's "first war", the province remained hostile to Canada in the aftermath of how the colony was forced into Canada. The celebration that followed the Halifax Provisional Battalion's return from the conflict by train across the county ignited a national patriotism in Nova Scotia. Prime Minister Robert Borden, stated that "up to this time Nova Scotia hardly regarded itself as included in the Canadian Confederation... The rebellion evoked a new spirit... The Riel Rebellion did more to unite Nova Scotia with the rest of Canada than any event that had occurred since Confederation." Similarly, in 1907 Governor General Earl Grey declared, "This Battalion... went out Nova Scotians, they returned Canadians." The wrought iron gates at the Halifax Public Gardens were made in the Battalion's honour. This is similar to Vimy Ridge.

== 20th century ==
=== Second Boer War ===
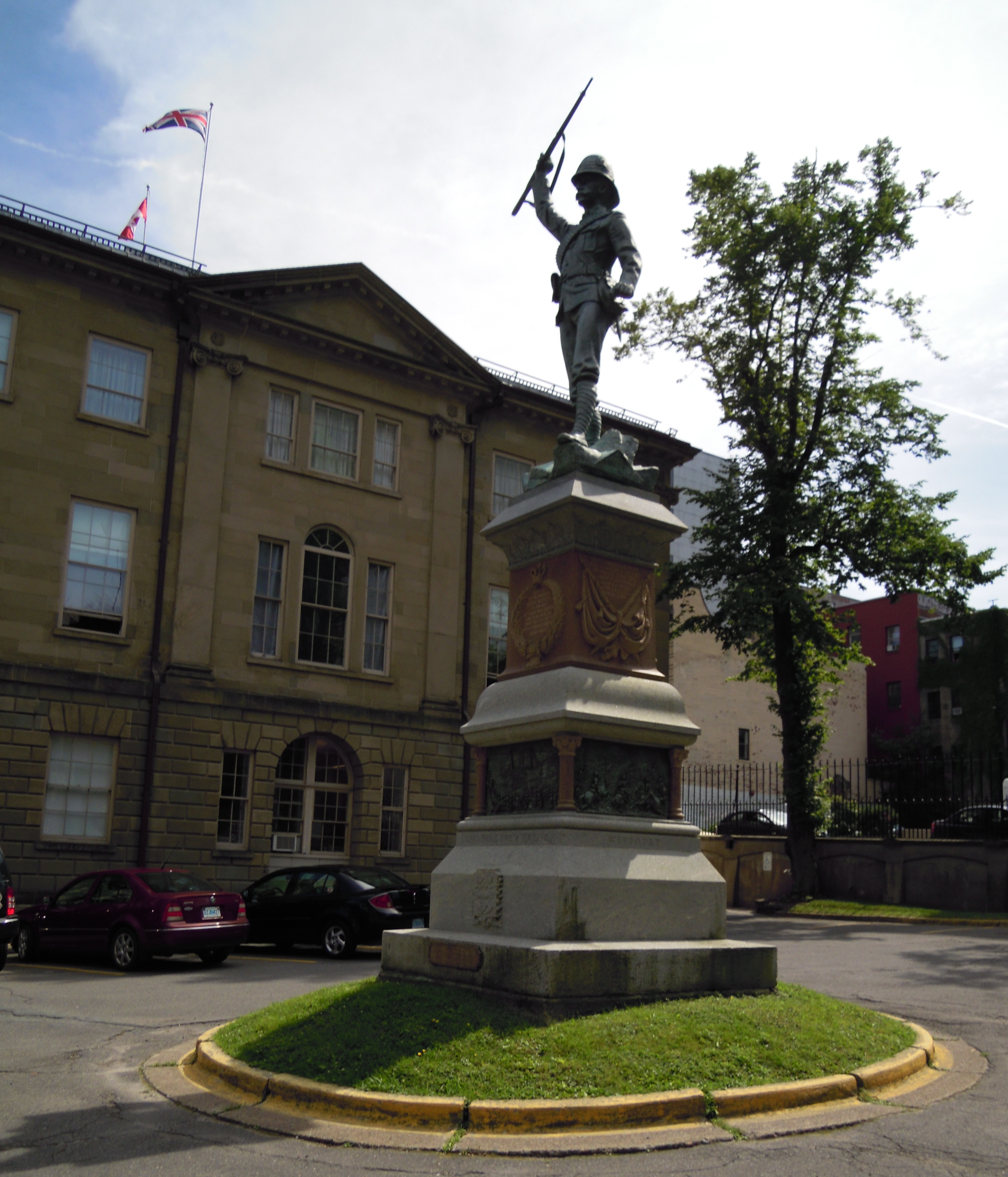
The South African War Memorial by Hamilton MacCarthy, now housed in Province House

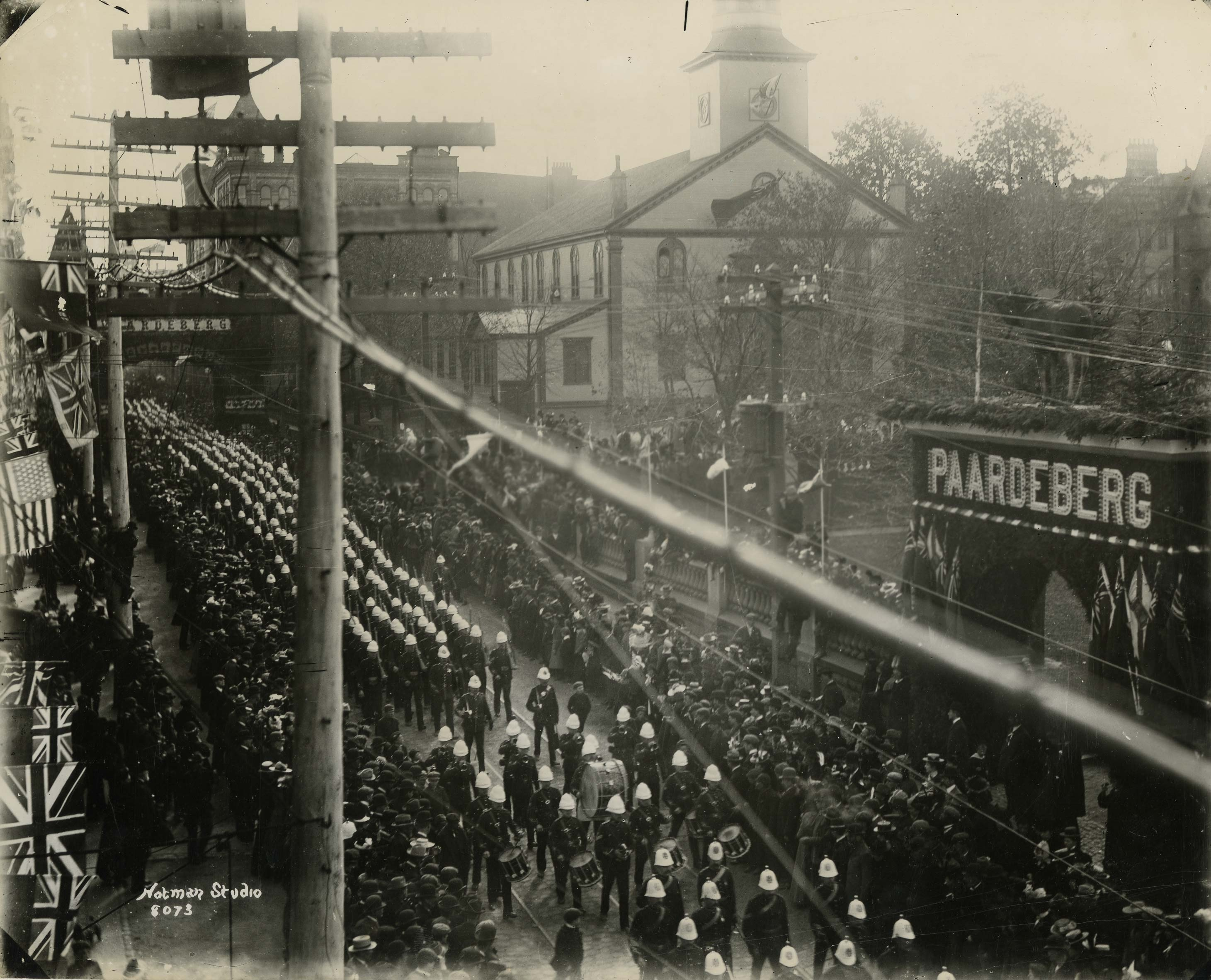
The Boer War victory parade on Barrington Street in Halifax

During the Second Boer War from 1899 to 1902, the First Contingent was composed of seven companies from across Canada. The Nova Scotia Company (H) consisted of 125 men. (The total First Contingent was a total force of 1,019. Eventually over 8,600 Canadians served.) The mobilization of the Contingent took place at Quebec. On October 30, 1899, the ship Sardinian sailed the troops for four weeks to Cape Town. The Boer War marked the first occasion in which large contingents of Nova Scotian troops served abroad (individual Nova Scotians had served in the Crimean War).

The Battle of Paardeberg in February 1900 represented the second time Canadian soldiers saw battle abroad (the first being the Canadian involvement in the Nile Expedition). Canadians also saw action at the Battle of Faber's Put on May 30, 1900. On November 7, 1900, the Royal Canadian Dragoons engaged the Boers in the Battle of Leliefontein, where they saved British guns from capture during a retreat from the banks of the Komati River. Approximately 267 Canadians died in the war. 89 men were killed in action, 135 died of disease, and the remainder died of accident or injury. 252 were wounded.

=== Halifax and Southwestern Railway ===
In 1901, Halifax and Southwestern Railway (H&SW) was planned. The railway would run from Halifax to Yarmouth along the province's South Shore. In the years before the domination of publicly funded highways, the H&SW would form a critical transportation link between the various communities, as well as steam ship connections at Yarmouth (to Boston and New York) and Halifax (to Europe). Construction was completed in 1906 and H&SW tracks joined the Intercolonial Railway's mainline in Halifax at Southwestern Junction at Africville and ran into the Intercolonial's North Street Station. On December 19, 1906 the first H&SW through train reached Yarmouth from Halifax. At some point during the period following completion of the H&SW in 1906, the system was merged into Canadian Northern Railway (CNoR) transcontinental system. The H&SW, along with the Inverness Railway, were isolated from the rest of CNoR's trackage which ran from Montreal to Vancouver, not unlike rival Canadian Pacific Railway's Dominion Atlantic Railway.

The CNR, along with several other railway lines in Canada, entered financial difficulties during the First World War. Encumbered by construction debts and low traffic, the CNoR was bankrupt and requested financial aid from the federal government in 1918. On September 6, 1918, CNoR was nationalized and placed under a Board of Management by the Department of Railways and Canals. On December 20, 1918, CNoR, along with the Canadian Government Railways were placed under a new company named Canadian National Railways (CNR).

=== Titanic disaster (1912) ===
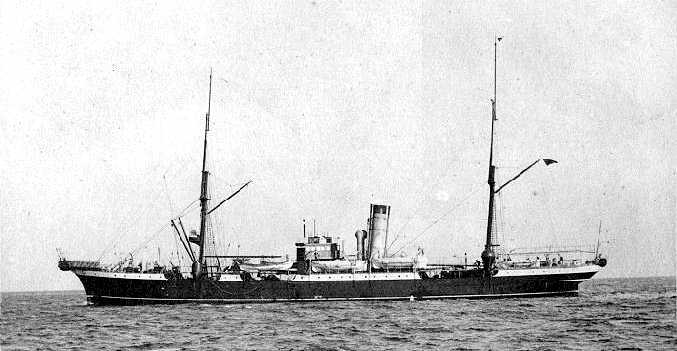
CS Mackay-Bennett of Halifax recovered bodies of RMS Titanic

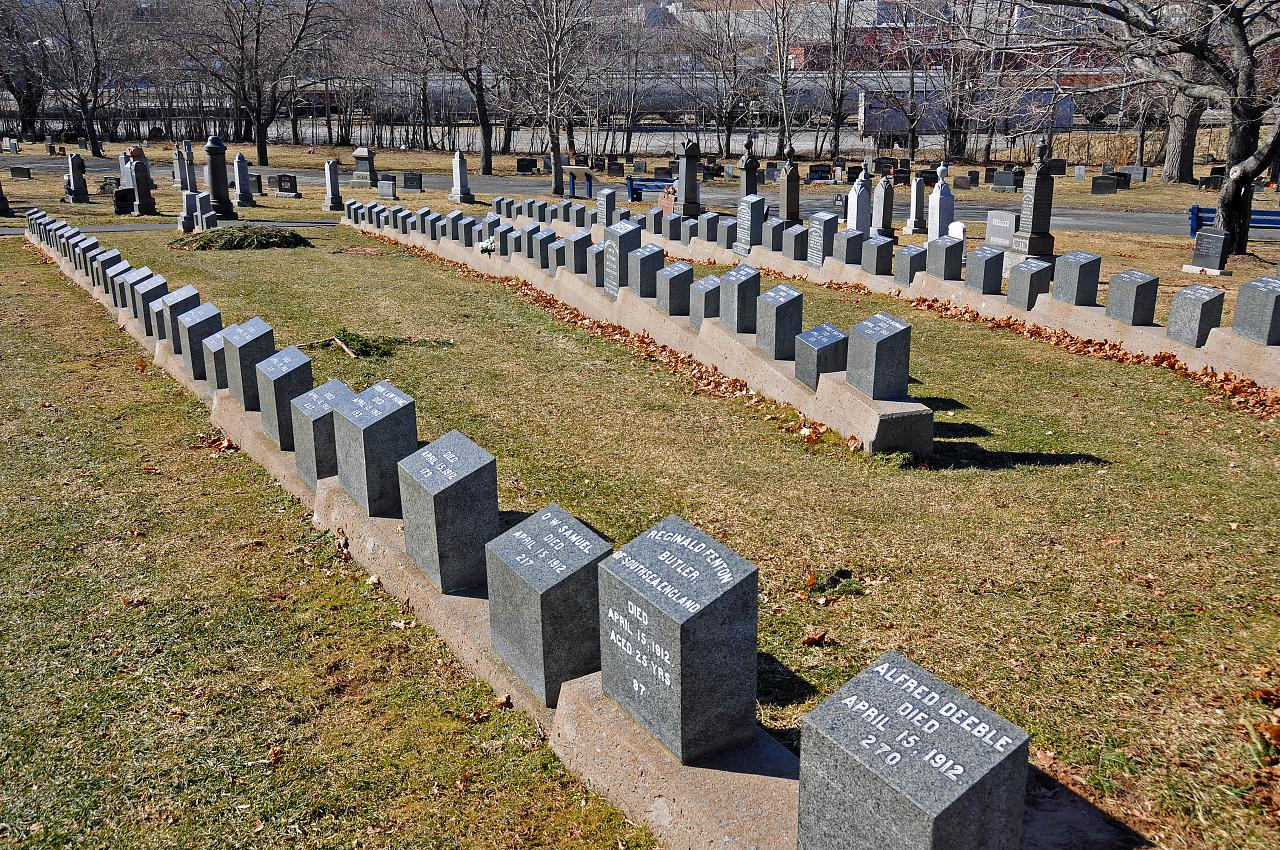
Markers of Titanic victims at Fairview Cemetery in Halifax

In April 1912, Halifax became the centre of recovery operations following the sinking of RMS Titanic. The city was the closest to the disaster site with direct rail and steamship connections. Two Halifax-based ships, CS Mackay-Bennett and CS Minia, were sent to recover the bodies still floating in the North Atlantic. Mackay-Bennett was the first ship to reach the disaster area and retrieved most of the bodies that were recovered.

Only 333 bodies of Titanic victims were recovered, one in five of the over 1,500 victims. (Titanic carried 2,224 passengers and crew.) A large temporary morgue was set up in the curling rink of the Mayflower Curling Club and the present-day Maritime Conservatory of Performing Arts building. The majority of recovered victims, 150 bodies, were buried in three Halifax cemeteries, 121 being buried in Fairview Lawn Cemetery followed by the nearby Mount Olivet and Baron de Hirsch cemeteries. Relatives from across North America came to identify and claim the remaining bodies.

=== World War I ===
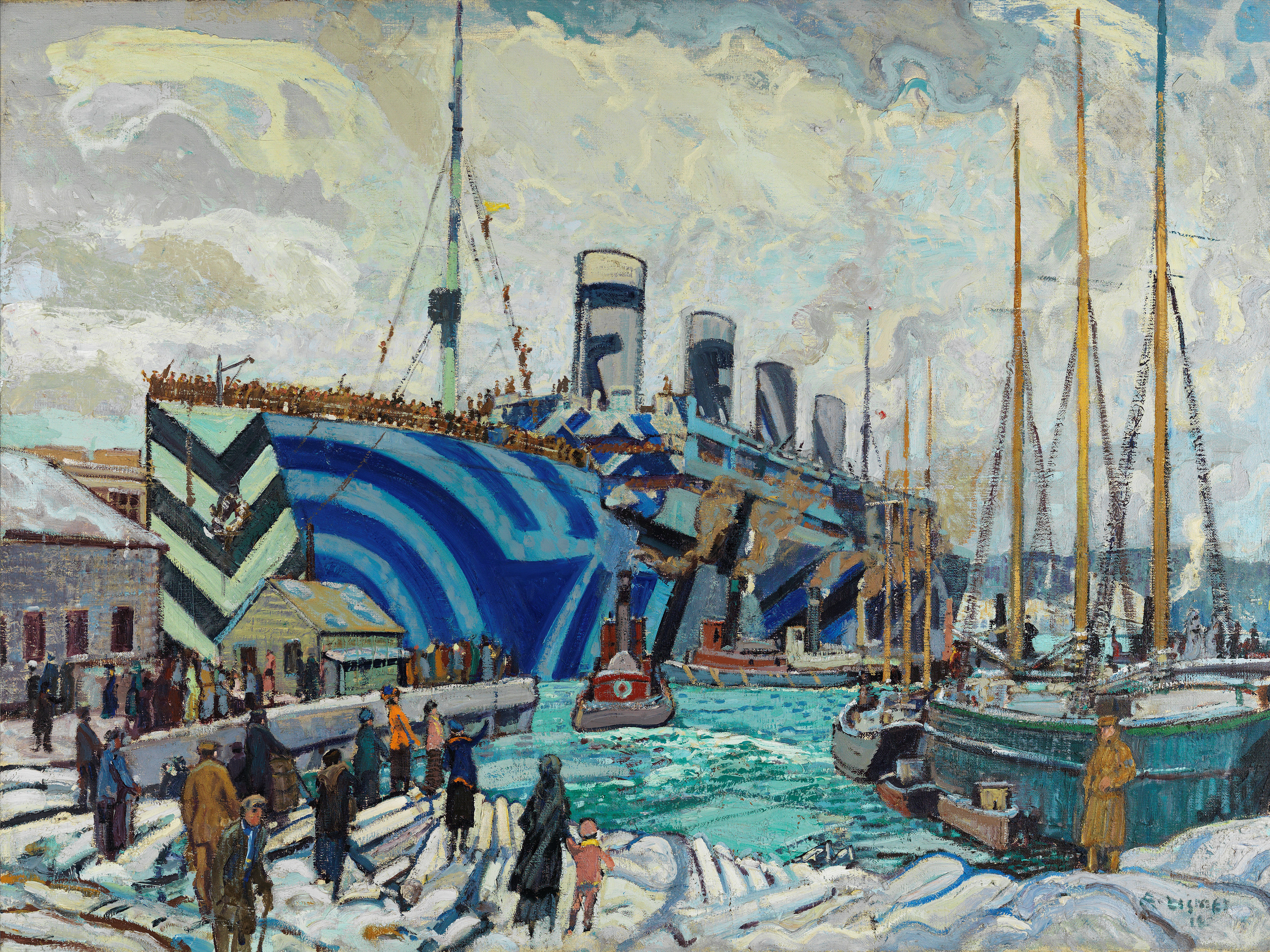
A portrait of troopship Olympic at Halifax by Arthur Lismer

An important port for the Caribbean-Canada-United Kingdom shipping triangle during the 19th century, Halifax's strategic harbour was also an integral part of Allied war efforts during both world wars.

It was in World War I that Halifax would truly come into its own as a world class port and naval facility in the steamship era. The strategic location of the port with its protective waters of Bedford Basin sheltered convoys from German U-boat attack prior to heading into the open Atlantic Ocean. Halifax's railway connections with the Intercolonial Railway of Canada and its port facilities became vital to the British war effort during the First World War as Canada's industrial centres churned out material for the Western Front. In 1914, Halifax began playing a major role in World War I, both as the departure point for Canadian soldiers heading overseas, and as an assembly point for all convoys (a responsibility which would be placed on the city again during World War II). Most Canadian troops left overseas from Halifax aboard enormous peacetime ocean liners converted to troopships such as RMS Olympic (sister ship of Titanic) and RMS Mauretania as well as many smaller liners. The city also served as the return point for wounded soldiers returning on hospital ships. A new generation of gun batteries, searchlights and an anti-submarine net defended the harbour, manned by a large garrison of soldiers. The United States Navy established a naval air station on August 19, 1918 to operate seaplanes. The base closed shortly after the First Armistice at Compiègne. Halifax's limited 19th century housing and transit facilities were heavily burdened. In November 1917, a subway system plan was presented to City Hall, but the city did not pursue the scheme.

=== Halifax Explosion (1917) ===
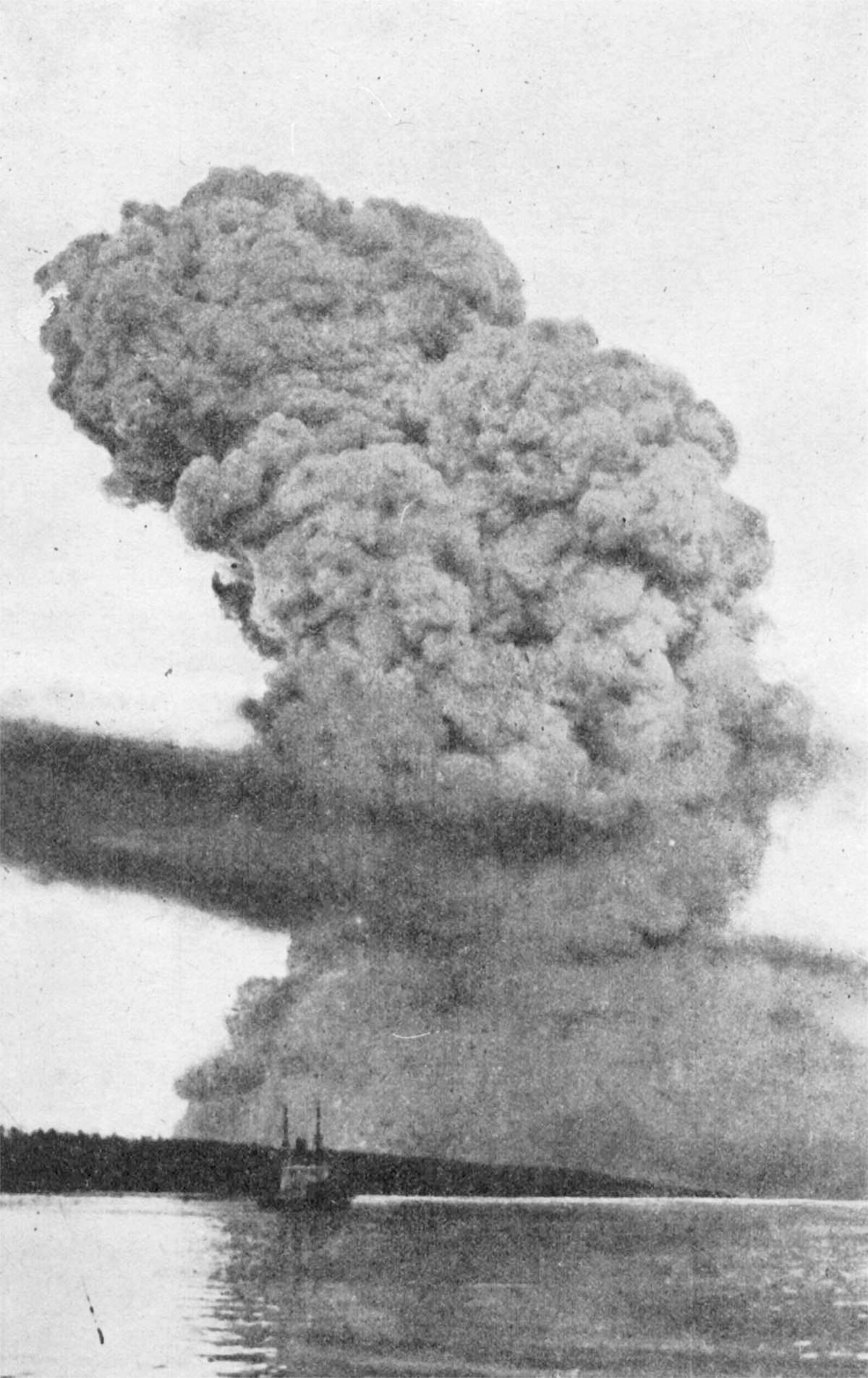
A blast cloud from the Halifax explosion

The war was seen as a blessing for the city's economy, but in 1917 a French munitions ship, Mont-Blanc, collided with a Norwegian ship, Imo. The collision sparked a fire on the munitions ship which was filled with 2,300 tons of wet and dry picric acid (used for making lyddite for artillery shells), 200 tons of trinitrotoluene (TNT), 10 tons of gun cotton, with drums of Benzol (High Octane fuel) stacked on her deck. On December 6, 1917, at 9:04:35 AM the munitions ship exploded in what was the largest man-made explosion before the first testing of an atomic bomb, and is still one of the largest non-nuclear man-made explosions. Items from the exploding ship landed 5 kilometres (3.1 mi) away. The Halifax Explosion decimated the city's north end, killing roughly 2,000 inhabitants, injuring 9,000, and leaving tens of thousands homeless and without shelter.

The following day a blizzard hit the city, hindering recovery efforts. Immediate help rushed in from the rest of Nova Scotia, New Brunswick, Prince Edward Island, and Newfoundland. In the following week more relief from other parts of North America arrived and donations were sent from around the world. The most celebrated effort came from the Boston Red Cross and the Massachusetts Public Safety Committee, since 1971 the province of Nova Scotia has donated the Christmas tree lit at the Boston Common in Boston.

The explosion and the rebuilding which followed had important impacts on the city: reshaping the layout of North End neighbourhoods; creating a progressive housing development known as the Hydrostone; and hastening the move of railways to the South End of the city.

=== Interwar period (1918-1939) ===
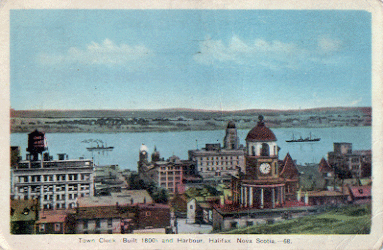
Downtown Halifax in 1920

The city's economy slumped after the war, although reconstruction from the Halifax Explosion brought new housing and infrastructure as well as the establishment of the Halifax Shipyard. However, a tremendous drop in worldwide shipping following the war as well as the failure of regional industries in the 1920s brought hard-times to the city, further aggravated by the Great Depression in 1929. One bright spot was the completion of Ocean Terminals and the Pier 21 immigration complex in the city's south end, a large modern complex to trans-ship freight and passengers from steamships to railways. The harbour's strategic location made the city the base for the famous and successful salvage tug Foundation Franklin which brought lucrative salvage jobs to the city in the 1930s. While a military airport had been in operation at Dartmouth's Shearwater base since World War I, the city opened its first civilian airport in the city's West End at Chebucto Field in 1931. Pan-Am began international flights from Boston in 1932.

War Plan Red, a military strategy developed by the United States Army during the mid-1920s and officially withdrawn in 1939, involved an occupation of Halifax by US forces following a poison gas first strike, to deny the British a major naval base and cut links between Britain and Canada.

=== World War II ===
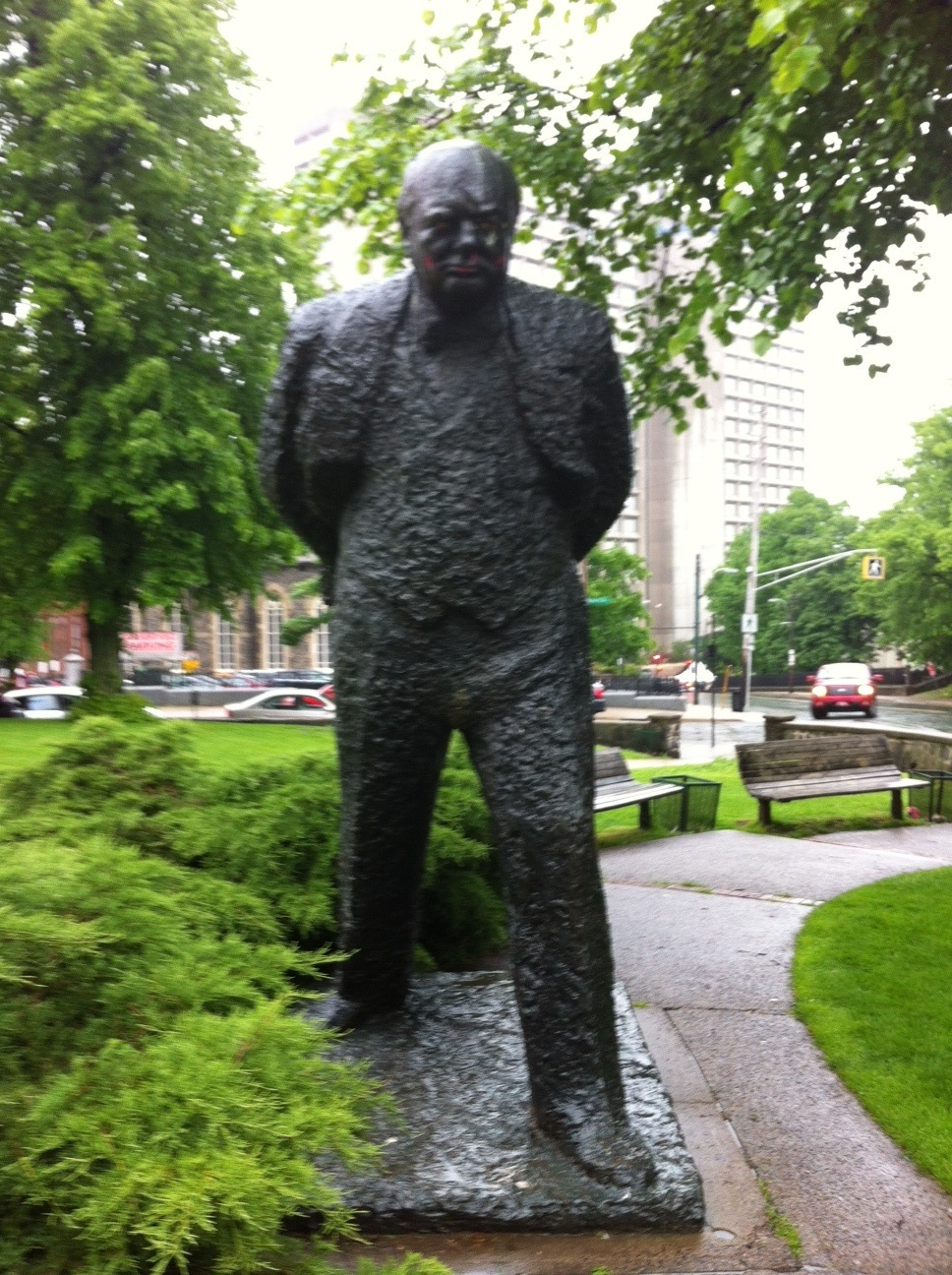
Winston Churchill by Oscar Nemon

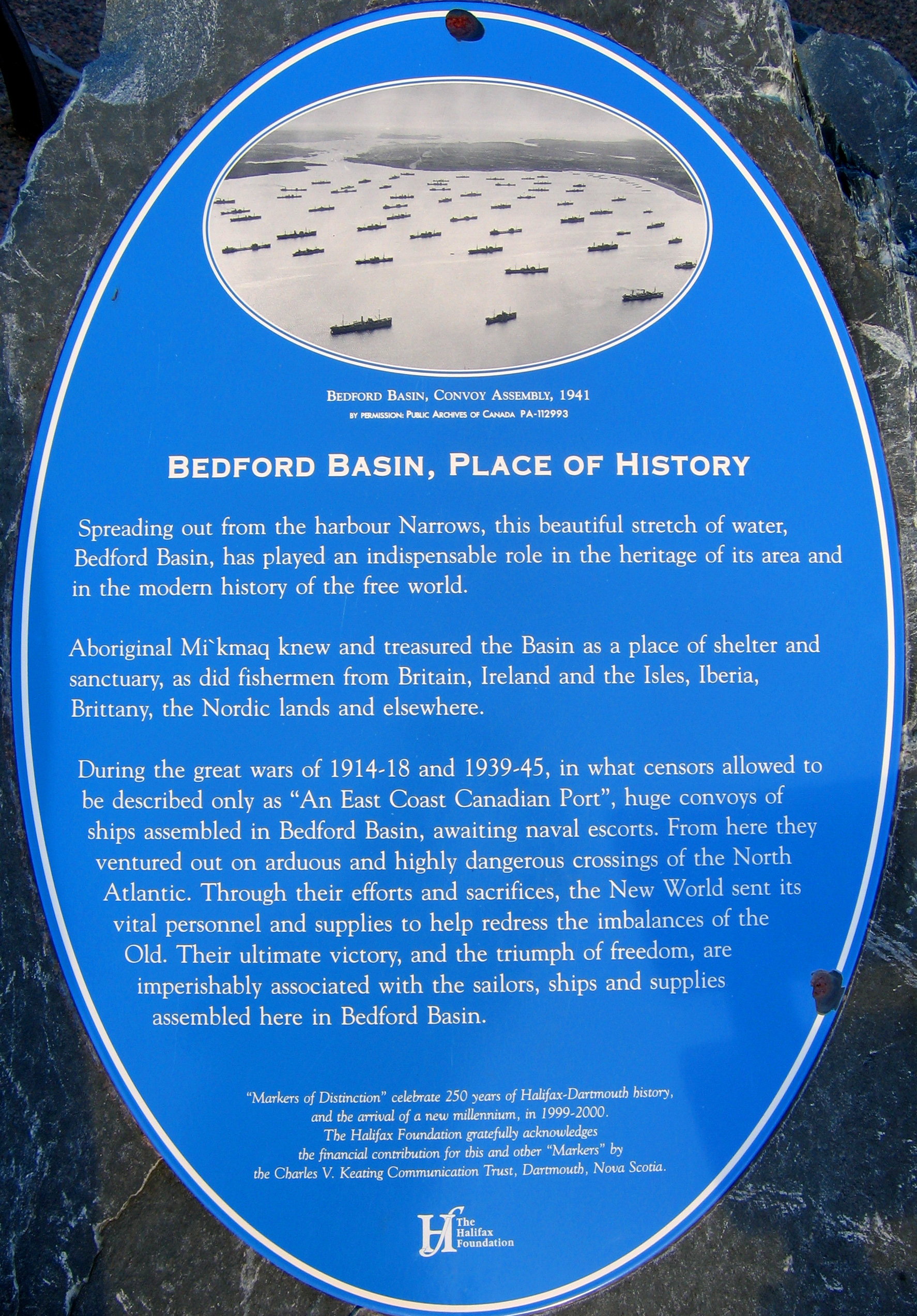
Plaque commemorating Halifax's role as a convoy assembly point

Halifax played an even bigger role in the Allied naval war effort of World War II. The only theatre of War to be commanded by a Canadian was the North Western Atlantic, commanded from Halifax by Rear-Admiral Leonard W. Murray. Halifax became a lifeline for preserving Britain during the Nazi onslaught of the Battle of Britain and the Battle of the Atlantic, the supplies helping to offset a threatened amphibious invasion by Germany. Many convoys assembled in Bedford Basin to deliver supplies to troops in Europe. The city's railway links fed large numbers of troopships building up Allied armies in Europe. The harbour became an essential base for Canadian, British and other Allied warships. Very much a front-line city, civilians lived with the fears of possible German raids or another accidental ammunition explosion. Well-defended, the city was never attacked although some merchant ships and two small naval vessels were sunk at the outer approaches to the harbour. However, the sounds and sometimes the flames of these distant attacks fed wartime rumours, some of which linger to the present day of imaginary tales of German U-boats entering Halifax Harbour. The city's housing, retail and public transit infrastructure, small and neglected after 20 years of prewar economic stagnation was severely stressed. Severe housing and recreational problems simmered all through the war and culminated in the Halifax Riot on VE Day in May 1945. The war was also marked by a massive explosion of the Navy's Bedford ammunition magazine which accidentally blew up on July 18, 1945 causing the evacuation of the north end of Halifax and Dartmouth and fears of another Halifax Explosion.

=== Bedford Magazine explosion ===
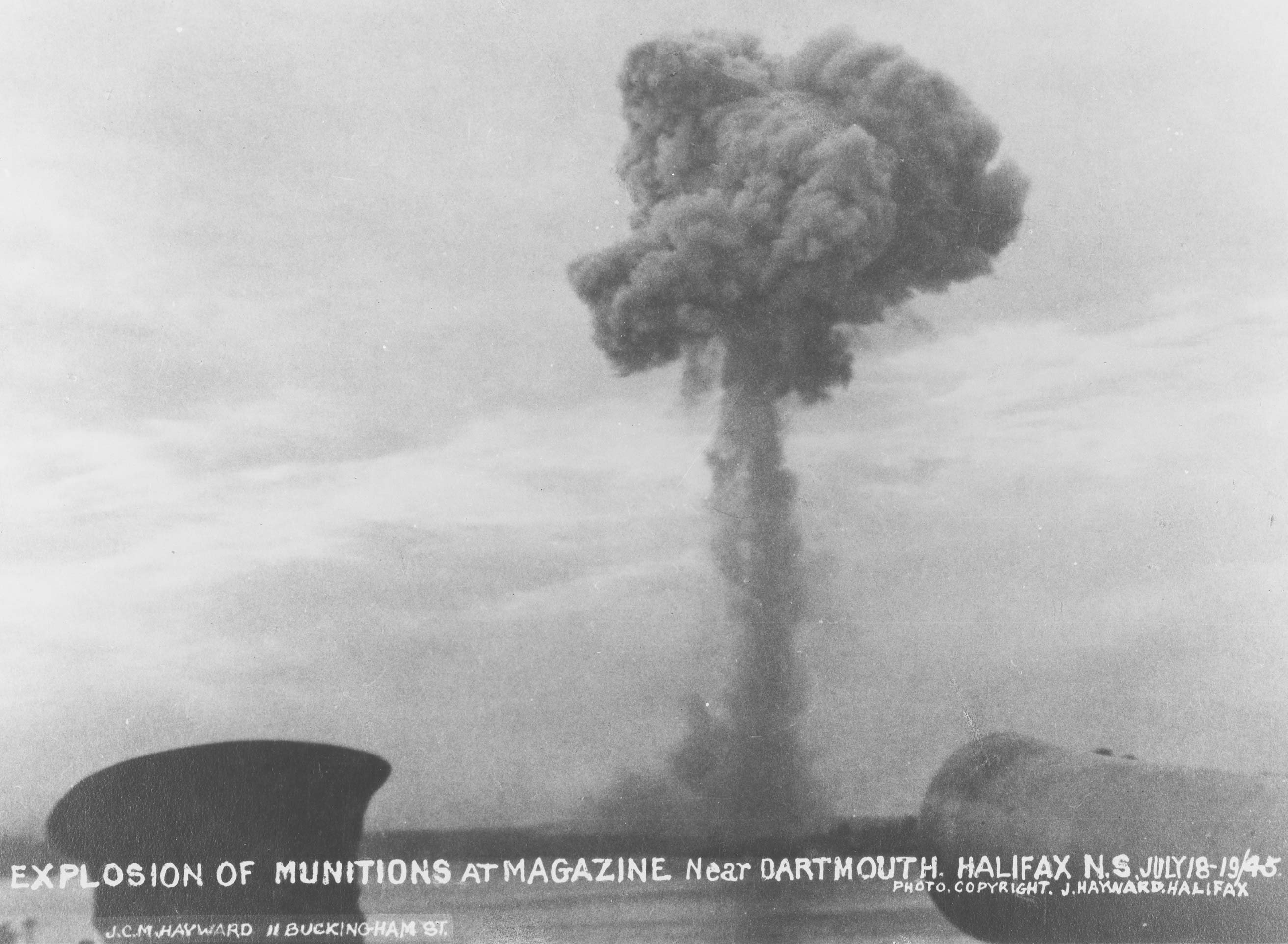
Blast cloud from the Bedford Magazine explosion

During World War II, Dartmouth and Halifax were engaged in supporting Canada's war effort in Europe. On July 18, 1945, at the end of World War II, a fire broke out at the magazine jetty on the Bedford Basin, north of Dartmouth. The fire began on a sunken barge and quickly spread to the dock. A violent series of large explosions ensued as stored ammunition exploded. The barge responsible for starting the explosion presently lies on the seabed near the eastern shoreline adjacent to the Magazine Dock.

=== Halifax Riot (May 1945) ===
The Halifax Riot happened on VE-Day, May 7–8, 1945 in Halifax and Dartmouth, Nova Scotia began as a celebration of the World War II Victory in Europe. This rapidly devolved into a rampage by several thousand servicemen, merchant seamen and civilians, who looted the City of Halifax. Although a subsequent Royal Commission chaired by Justice Roy Kellock blamed lax naval authority and specifically Rear-Admiral Leonard W. Murray, it is generally accepted that the underlying causes were a combination of bureaucratic confusion, insufficient policing and antipathy between the military and civilians, fueled by the presence of 25,000 servicemen who had strained Halifax wartime resources to the limit.

=== Postwar years ===
After World War II, Halifax did not experience the postwar economic malaise it had so often experienced after previous wars. This was partially due to the Cold War which required continued spending on a modern Canadian navy. However, the city also benefited from a more diverse economy and postwar growth in government services and education. The 1960s–1990s saw less suburban sprawl than in many comparable Canadian cities in the areas surrounding Halifax. This was partly as a result of local geographies and topography (Halifax is extremely hilly with exposed granite not conducive to construction), a weaker regional and local economy, and a smaller population base than, for example, central Canada or New England. There were also deliberate local government policies to limit not only suburban growth but also put some controls on growth in the central business district to address concerns from heritage advocates.

The late 1960s was a period of significant change and expansion of the city when surrounding areas of Halifax County were amalgamated into Halifax: Princes Lodge, Nova Scotia, Rockingham, Clayton Park, Fairview, Armdale, and Spryfield were all added in 1969.

A desire to promote development by Halifax downtown business interests proposed demolishing the Halifax Citadel and leveling Citadel Hill to provide parking and encourage development in the late 1940s. However, recognition of the fort's historical significance and tourism potential led to the fort's preservation in 1956 and gradual restoration by Parks Canada as a city landmark and top tourism draw.

Urban renewal plans in the 1960s and 1970s resulted in the loss of much of its heritage architecture and community fabric in large downtown developments such as the Scotia Square mall and office towers. However, a citizens protest movement limited further destructive plans such as a waterfront freeway called Harbour Drive, which opened the way for a popular and successful revitalized waterfront. A remainder of the cancelled freeway plan is the Cogswell Interchange.

Selective height limits were also achieved to protect the views from Citadel Hill. However, municipal heritage protection remained weak with only pockets of heritage buildings surviving in the downtown and constant pressure from developers for further demolition. Selective height restrictions were adopted to protect views from Citadel Hill which triggered battles over proposed developments that would fill vacant lots or add height to existing historical structures.

Another casualty during the 1960s and 1970s period of expansion and urban renewal was the Black community of Africville which was declared a slum, demolished and its residents displaced to clear land for industrial use as well as for the A. Murray MacKay Bridge. The repercussions continue to this day and a 2001 United Nations report has called for reparations be paid to the community's former residents.

In 1980, Bedford incorporated as a separate municipality (a town).

Restrictions on development were relaxed somewhat during the 1990s, resulting in some suburban sprawl off the peninsula. Today the community of Halifax is more compact than most Canadian urban areas although expanses of suburban growth have occurred in neighbouring Dartmouth, Bedford and Sackville. One development in the late 1990s was the Bayers Lake Business Park, where warehouse style retailers were permitted to build in a suburban industrial park west of Rockingham. This has become an important yet controversial centre of commerce for the city and the province as it used public infrastructure to subsidise multi-national retail chains and draw business from local downtown business. Much of this subsidy was due to competition between Halifax, Bedford and Dartmouth to host these giant retail chains and this controversy helped lead the province to force amalgamation as a way to end wasteful municipal rivalries. In the past few years, urban housing sprawl has even reached these industrial/retail parks as new blasting techniques permitted construction on the granite wilderness around the city. What was once a business park surrounded by forest and a highway on one side has become a large suburb with numerous new apartment buildings and condominiums. Some of this growth has been spurred by offshore oil and natural gas economic activity but much has been due to a population shift from rural Nova Scotian communities to the Halifax urban area. The new amalgamated city has attempted to manage this growth with a new master development plan.

=== 1996 amalgamation and Community status ===
The provincial government had sought to reduce the number of municipal governments in the province as a cost-saving measure. In 1992, a task force was created to pursue this cutback.

In 1995, the Act to Incorporate the Halifax Regional Municipality received Royal Assent in the provincial legislature. On 1 April 1996, the Town of Bedford, the City of Dartmouth, the City of Halifax, and the County of Halifax were dissolved, and the Halifax Regional Municipality was created.

Although the amalgamation dissolved the aforementioned cities, suburbs, towns, and villages, residents of the former-places commonly refer to their locality their respective community (use of the colloquial term city is used for residents of Dartmouth-and-Halifax), and not as resident of the Halifax Regional Municipality. (E.g. if a person asks where they live in Nova Scotia, the person will say they are from Dartmouth—not from the Halifax Regional Municipality).

== 21st century ==
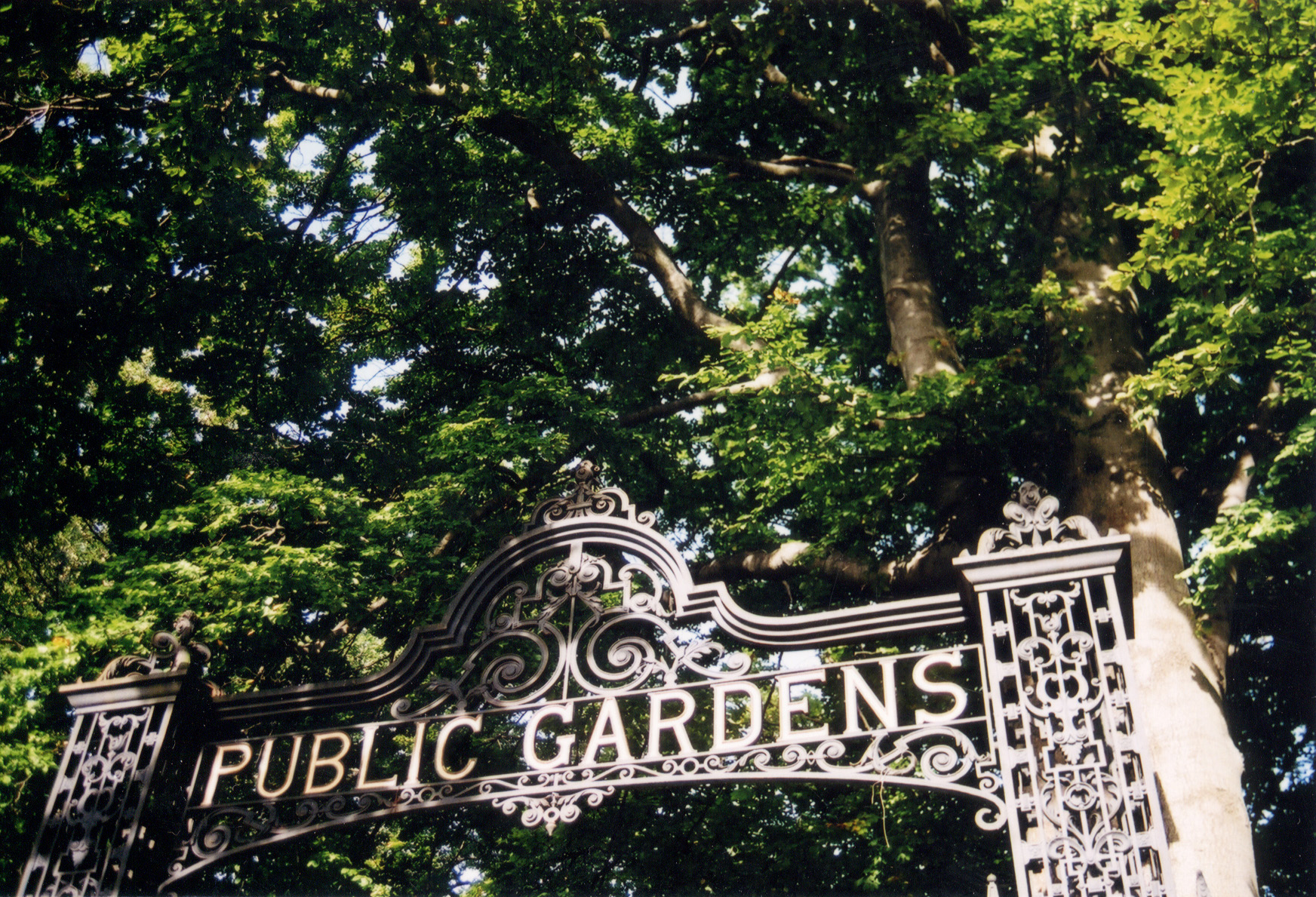
The entrance to Public Gardens before Hurricane Juan

During the mid-to-late 1990s, HRM developed a strong national and international following to its music scene, particularly the alternative genre. Musical acts from HRM include such notable groups as: Sloan, The Nellis Complex, Thrush Hermit, Christina Clark, and Sarah McLachlan.

Although discussions had been underway for decades in the former cities of Halifax and Dartmouth, a deal was finally signed in 2003 that saw the construction of several sewage treatment plants for the core urban area, as well as an extensive trunk collector system to link outfalls to each plant. For the first time since settlement came to the area, human sewage will be treated before it is discharged into the Atlantic Ocean; estimated start-up is for 2007.

=== Hurricane Juan ===
On September 29, 2003, HRM was hit by Hurricane Juan which made landfall west of the urban core. Juan was the most powerful hurricane to directly hit the Halifax-Dartmouth metropolitan area since 1893. The storm caused a serious disruption throughout the central and eastern part of the municipality during the first week of October. Although some areas of the urban core only lost electricity for a brief period, outlying rural regions in the eastern part of HRM were without electricity for up to two weeks. Millions of trees in HRM were damaged or destroyed in the dense forests along the Eastern Shore.

On January 13, 2008 the government of Nova Scotia proclaimed the "Halifax Regional Municipality Charter Act" giving the municipality more powers to address the specific needs of HRM.

=== Africville Apology ===
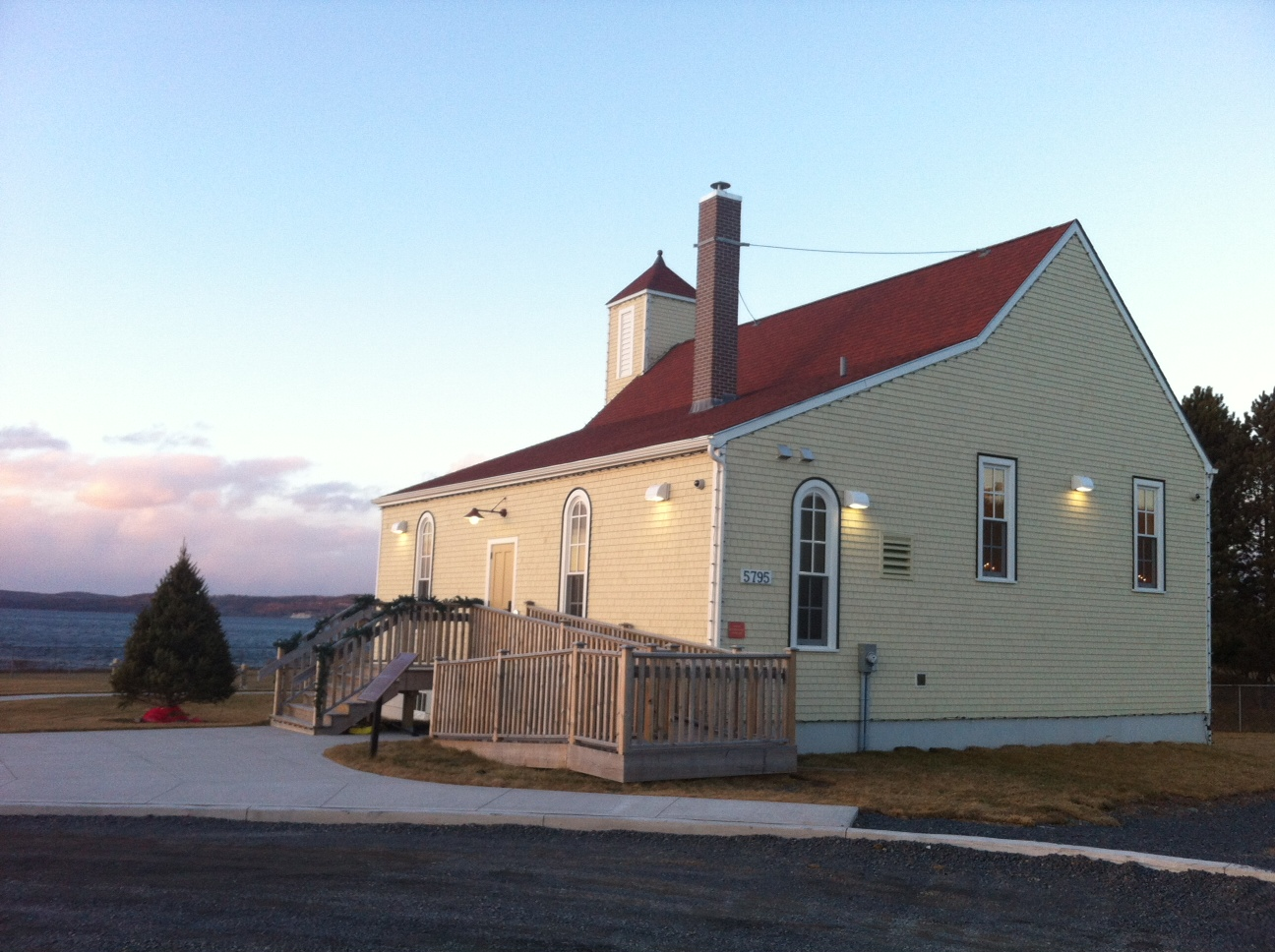
Africville Church, rebuilt as part of the Africville Apology

On February 24, 2010, Halifax Mayor Peter J. Kelly made the Africville Apology, apologizing for the eviction of those from Africville as part of a $4.5-million compensation deal. The city restored the name Africville to Seaview Park at the annual Africville Family Reunion on July 29, 2011. The Seaview African United Baptist Church, demolished in 1969, was rebuilt in the summer of 2011 to serve as a church and interpretation centre. The nearly complete church was ceremonially opened on September 25, 2011.

== Geography ==
The community's total landmass is 6,196.1 hectares (61.961 km^{2}). It accounts for less than 1.2% of the municipal landmass, and less than 27% of the urban landmass.

The community is located in the Atlantic Maritime ecozone, the Appalachian land-form region, and the wet-climate soil-region. Furthermore, Halifax is within the Atlantic Canada climate-region, and the Mixwood-forest vegetation-region.

=== Historical political geography ===
The original settlements of Halifax occupied a small stretch of land inside a palisade at the foot of Citadel Hill on the Halifax Peninsula, a sub-peninsula of the much larger Chebucto Peninsula that extends into Halifax Harbour. Over time, Halifax grew to incorporate all of the north, south, and west ends of the peninsula with a central business district concentrated in the southeastern end along the Narrows.

In 1969, the City of Halifax grew significantly. The City annexed several communities from the surrounding Halifax County; Armdale, Clayton Park, Fairview, Purcell's Cove, Rockingham, and Spryfield.

On 1 April 1996, the City of Dartmouth, City of Halifax, County of Halifax, and the Town of Bedford amalgamated and formed the Halifax Regional Municipality. Subsequently, the City of Halifax dissolved, and was reestablished as the Community of Halifax. The new community is coterminous with the former City.

The streets on the Halifax peninsula are a grid and numbered sequentially making it easy to get around. Numbered from south-to-north House Numbers start at 1 and reach 1000 block at Inglis Street, 2000 block at Quinpool Road, 3000 block at Almon Street and 4000 block at Duffus Street. Moving from east-to-west 5000 block is at Lower Water Street, 6000 block at Robie Street. One of the longest streets on the peninsula is Robie Street. When looking for 2010 Robie Street look one block north of Quinpool Road across from the Halifax Commons, move a block to the west and you will find 2010 Windsor Street; walk a few more blocks west and Quinpool will take you to 2010 Oxford Street. If you are moving west on Almon Street you will find 5200 Almon at the Göttingen Street intersection, 6000 Almon at Robie, 7000 Almon at Connaught Avenue, Chebucto Road numbers to 8000 at Joseph Howe Drive. The numbering system is consistent to the grid even when the streets are not perfectly parallel or perpendicular to one another on the map.

=== Neighbourhoods ===
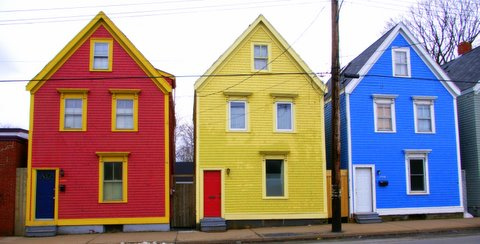
Colourful houses in Halifax

Colloquial neighbourhood names

- North End Halifax, north of North Street to Seaview Park
- West End, Halifax, West of Windsor Street, between North and South Streets to Joseph Howe Drive
- Quinpool District, Shopping and Dining area
- South End Halifax, South of South Street to Point Pleasant Park
- Spring Garden, shopping and dining area
- Central Halifax, the original city, between North Street and South Street, from Lower-Water Street to Windsor Street

Official neighbourhood names

(including former villages, residential neighbourhoods; and modern names of housing developments and industrial parks)

- Armdale, village neighbourhood
- Bayer's Lake
- Beechwood Park
- Boulderwood
- Bridgeview
- Clayton Park
- Convoy Place
- Cowie Hill
- Fairmount
- Fairview, village neighbourhood
- Fernleigh
- Green Acres
- Hydrostone post Halifax Explosion re-development neighbourhood
- Jollimore, village neighbourhood
- Kent Park
- Leiblin Park
- Melville Cove
- Mulgrave Park, housing development in Mulgrave district
- Moirs Mill, Nova Scotia
- Princes Lodge, Nova Scotia
- Rockingham, village neighbourhood
- Sherwood Heights
- Spryfield, village neighbourhood
- Thornhill
- Wedgewood
- Westmount Subdivision

Historic neighbourhood names

- Africville, now Seaview Park
- Richmond, now The North End east of Novalea Drive facing the harbour.
- Mulgrave (Halifax), north of Duffus Street, east of Göttingen Street in the North End.
- Needham (Halifax), now The Hydrostone and much of the North End west of Novalea Drive.
- Dutch Village, The West End west of Windsor Street
- Fort Massey, East of Robie Street from Duke Street to South Street

Richmond, Needham and Mulgrave were voting district names. Historically, these working-class Catholic neighbourhoods used their parish names: Saint Stephen's, Saint Joeseph's, Saint Patrick's. Today they are the integrated and prosperous North End; the neighbourhood names are no longer in common use and the parish boundaries no longer exist.

== Demographics ==
Currently, the Community's is at its highest ever population. Within its relatively small landmass, there are 156,141 inhabitants as of 2021. Even if it was still an independent city with its former boundaries, it would be the largest city in Atlantic Canada.

From 2016 to 2021, the community's population increased by 19,621 people; from 136,520 people to 156,141 people. The increase represented very-strong growth of higher-than 14% over a time-period of five-years.

The community of Halifax consists of census tracts 2050001.00 to 2050027.00.

Census Tract	Land area (km^{2})	Population (2021)	Population (2016)	Population Density (people per km^{2}) (2021)	Population Change (%)
2050001.00	5.703	4,123	3,868	722	▲6.5
2050002.00	11.518	8,358	6,194	725	▲34.9
2050003.00	2.365	2,885	2,955	1,219	▼2.4
2050004.01	0.481	4,045	3,466	8,402	▲16.7
2050004.02	0.482	5,466	4,771	11,340	▲14.6
2050005.00	0.769	1,813	1,808	2,358	▲0.3
2050006.00	1.054	3,553	3,129	3,371	▲13.6
2050007.00	1.16	1,947	1,859	1,677	▲4.7
2050008.00	0.504	5,203	2,778	10,325	▲87.3
2050009.00	0.635	2,875	2,357	4,528	▲22
2050010.00	0.834	6,019	5,036	7,213	▲19.5
2050011.00	0.808	6,013	5,631	7,446	▲6.8
2050012.00	0.518	2,901	2,482	5,598	▲16.9
2050013.00	0.805	2,630	2,561	3,267	▲2.7
2050014.00	1.838	4,390	4,248	2,388	▲3.3
2050015.00	2.042	5,389	4,829	2,639	▲15.9
2050016.00	2.563	4,021	3,766	1,568	▲6.7
2050017.00	2.912	2,999	2,914	1,029	▲2.9
2050018.00	1.397	3,758	3,544	2,690	▲6
2050019.00	0.891	5,126	5,062	5,755	▲1.3
2050020.00	0.999	3,602	2,562	3,607	▲40.6
2050021.00	0.877	3,544	3,314	4,041	▲6.9
2050022.00	2.833	5,581	5,301	1,969	▲5.3
2050023.00	1.537	5,208	4,594	3,388	▲13.4
2050024.00	2.181	8,618	7,375	3,951	▲16.8
2050025.01	1.05	5,201	4,726	4,953	▲10
2050025.02	1.913	5,515	4,863	2,882	▲13.4
2050025.04	0.911	4,818	4,685	5,288	▲2.8
2050025.05	1.556	3,746	3,547	2,407	▲5.6
2050026.02	1.509	4,855	3,409	3,217	▲42.4
2050026.03	1.393	3,348	3,358	2,403	▼0.3
2050026.04	0.654	4,346	4,199	6,645	▲3.5
2050026.05	0.771	3,866	3,967	5,014	▼2.5
2050027.00	4.498	10,379	7,362	2,307	▲40.9
Community	61.961	156,141	136,520	2,519	▲14.3

Historical community population
Year	Pop.	±%
1749	2,576	—
1755	1,747	−32.2%
1762	2,500	+43.1%
1767	3,695	+47.8%
1790	4,000	+8.3%
1817	5,341	+33.5%
1828	14,439	+170.3%
1841	14,422	−0.1%
1851	20,749	+43.9%
1861	25,026	+20.6%
1871	29,582	+18.2%
1881	36,100	+22.0%
1891	38,437	+6.5%
1901	40,832	+6.2%
1911	46,619	+14.2%
1921	58,372	+25.2%
1931	59,275	+1.5%
1941	70,488	+18.9%
1951	85,589	+21.4%
1956	93,301	+9.0%
1961	92,511	−0.8%
1966	86,792	−6.2%
1971	122,035	+40.6%
1976	117,882	−3.4%
1981	114,594	−2.8%
1986	113,577	−0.9%
1991	114,455	+0.8%
1996	113,910	−0.5%
2001	119,292	+4.7%
2006	123,612	+3.6%
2011	130,944	+5.9%
2016	136,520	+4.3%
2021	156,141	+14.4%
From 1749 until 1842; Halifax was a Town. From 1842 until 1996; Halifax was a City. From 1996 until present; Halifax has been a Community. Source:

== See also ==
- Black Nova Scotians
- History of Dartmouth
- History of Nova Scotia
- List of mayors of Halifax, Nova Scotia
- List of people from the Halifax Regional Municipality
- Military history of Nova Scotia

== Sources ==
- Eaton, John P.; Haas, Charles A. (1995). Titanic: Triumph and Tragedy. New York: W.W. Norton & Company. ISBN 978-0-393-03697-8.
- Shea, Iris V.; Watts, Heather (2005). Deadman's: Melville Island & Its Burial Ground. Tantallon Nova Scotia: Glen Margaret Publishers. ISBN 978-0-393-05847-5.
