= Melville Island (Nova Scotia) =

Small peninsula in Nova Scotia, Canada

Coordinates: 44.635°N 63.614°W

Melville Island (centre) in 1878

Melville Island is a small peninsula in Nova Scotia, Canada, located in the Northwest Arm of Halifax Harbour, west of Deadman's Island. It is part of the Halifax Regional Municipality.

The site was discovered by Europeans in the 17th century, though it was likely earlier explored by Indigenous peoples. The land is rocky, with thin, acidic soil, but supports a limited woodland habitat. It was initially used for storehouses before being purchased by the British, who built a prisoner-of-war camp to hold captives from the Napoleonic Wars and later the War of 1812. The burial ground for prisoners was on the adjacent Deadman's Island.

Later, Melville Island was used as a receiving depot for Black refugees escaping slavery in the United States, then as a quarantine hospital for immigrants arriving from Europe (particularly Ireland). It briefly served as a recruitment centre for the British Foreign Legion during the Crimean War, and was then sold to the British for use as a military prison. In 1907 the land was granted to the Canadian government, which used it to detain German and Austro-Hungarian nationals during the First World War. During the Second World War, prisoners were sent to McNabs Island instead, and ammunition depots were kept on Melville Island.

The peninsula now houses the clubhouse and marina of the Armdale Yacht Club. Melville Island has been the subject of a number of cultural works, most of which concern its use as a prison.

== Geography ==
Map of the Northwest Arm showing the location of Melville Island

Melville Island is part of the Halifax Regional Municipality, on the southeast coast of Nova Scotia. The peninsula lies on the eastern boundary of Melville Cove in the Northwest Arm, an inlet between the Halifax Peninsula and Mainland Halifax. It has a total area of approximately 2,000 square metres (22,000 sq ft). Melville Island is 200 metres (660 ft) west of Deadman's Island, and southeast of Regatta Point. The peninsula lies on a fracture zone trending northwest–southeast, and is located at the border between the Halifax Slate Formation and a granite-based formation. There is evidence of glacial scouring in the area. The surrounding seabed ranges from gravel to muddy gravel, and the shore is rocky.

The water surrounding Melville Island is salty and ranges from 15 °C (59 °F) in summer to partially or completely frozen in winter. The water is polluted by sewage discharges from Halifax and is considered heavily contaminated. Water colour ranges from olive brown to greenish black, with little current. The water depth around Melville Island is 4.5 to 10.5 metres (15 to 34 ft).

The peninsula features thin and acidic soil, and hosts plants like witherod, Indian pear, Labrador tea, wintergreen, and blueberry shrubs. It is a woodland area, with birch, tamarack, maple, oak, beech, and white pine trees. Given the development of the land by the Armdale Yacht Club, plant growth is now largely limited to the hill on which the main clubhouse sits; most of the peninsula was paved in 1971. Fish caught from Melville Island include cod and mackerel. Local birds include grebes, loons, and alcids.

There is no weather monitoring station on Melville Island (the closest is the Halifax dockyards); however, as with most of the surrounding area, Melville has a humid continental climate heavily influenced by the water temperature in Halifax Harbour. Average air temperatures range from −4.4 °C (24.1 °F) in January to 18.9 °C (66.0 °F) in August. It receives about 1,500 mm (59 in) of precipitation per year, and may receive snow from October through April. Though the area is fairly sheltered, it is subject to damage from hurricanes and other storms, notably Hurricane Juan in 2003.

== History ==
=== Early use ===
Melville Island in 1801

Though the Halifax area was settled by aboriginals, particularly the Mi'kmaq people, as early as 7000 BC, there is no archaeological evidence of native habitation on Melville Island prior to the arrival of the Europeans. The first Europeans to reach the land were likely French traders and missionaries in the 17th century. Halifax was founded by the British in 1749. The first documented use of Melville Island was by Robert Cowie and John Aubony, who obtained a Crown grant in 1752 to allow them to build a storehouse. After Cowie's death in 1781, John Butler Kelly purchased what was then known as Cowie's Island and quickly resold it in 1784 to James Kavanagh, the head of a prosperous family fishery, for £65.

=== French Revolutionary Wars ===
After the 1793 beheading of Louis XVI sparked a war between Britain and France (see the French Revolutionary Wars), Nova Scotia Governor John Wentworth rented Kavanagh's Island to house 600 French prisoners that had been captured on St. Pierre and Miquelon. The commander of the Halifax garrison, Brigadier General James Ogilvie, objected to the plan, and instead housed the prisoners at Cornwallis Barracks in Halifax. Several prisoners were able to escape from the makeshift prison, and the rest were sent to Guernsey in June 1794.

In August 1794, a French ship captured in St. Domingo arrived in Halifax. A plan to house these prisoners in Halifax met with opposition from the citizenry because of a fear of "fever"; indeed, surgeon John Halliburton suggested that if the plan was carried out, "the popular would burn down [the housing] with the sick prisoners inside". Halliburton rented Kavanagh's Island, likely on the suggestion of Governor John Wentworth, and by June 1795 had sent 70 sick and wounded prisoners to its makeshift prison hospital. The other prisoners were kept on the prison ship La Felix. Sixteen soldiers of the Royal Nova Scotia Regiment acted as guards for the hospital beginning in 1796. Because of overcrowding aboard La Felix, some of its prisoners were allowed to live in Halifax, where some created such a disturbance that they were sent to Kavanagh's Island to be imprisoned. In 1801, the Treaty of Amiens resulted in most of the prisoners being returned to France, and the site was abandoned.

=== Napoleonic Wars (1803–1811) ===
The site was formally leased for prisoner housing in 1803 after fifteen French fishermen, three surgeons, and 188 seamen were brought to Halifax as prisoners during the Napoleonic Wars. Though many of these prisoners were later sent to England or Bermuda, one of the surgeons (Antoine Noel) was hired to care for the prisoners, while at least sixteen other prisoners were able to escape. Melville was purchased for £1000 in 1804 (£89,970 as of 2020) by Robert Murray, appointed by the British Admiralty as prison agent; he was replaced shortly thereafter by John MacKellar. At the time, the facility had a maximum capacity of 200 prisoners. The makeshift prison was noted for discipline problems.

The land was officially renamed Melville Island in late 1804 or early 1805 in honour of Henry Dundas, Viscount Melville (who at the time had just been appointed First Lord of the Admiralty). A wooden barracks-style military prison was constructed to house common prisoners, the cornerstone of which was laid in 1808 and is today preserved as a monument, while a multi-storey building was designed to hold officers. As no exchange system was established with the French, the prison quickly became overcrowded. Some Spanish prisoners were also housed in the prison at this time.

Upon their arrival on Melville, prisoners had their name and other details recorded in an entry book. Inmates were given yellow clothing that clearly identified them as prisoners of war, and were supplied with provisions of beef, bread, potatoes and salt from a local contractor "reputed to own most of the livestock in the region". Some officers were allowed to send trade goods to Halifax, or even work in the city as domestic servants or handymen. There were also prisoner-run shops and a "small town fair" on Melville Island, frequented by British officers and residents of Halifax. Other prisoner pursuits included prison lotteries, model shipbuilding, beer-brewing, fishing, and making molasses candy. Some prisoners were known to have pets or keep chickens.

In late 1805, a group of officers broke parole and escaped; this led the garrison captain to restrict the purchase of prisoner-made goods as a means of punishment and enforcing discipline. More serious punishments included flogging or being confined to a barred hole in the prison cellar, known as the "Black Hole", with only bread and water. One of the prisoners, Pierre Poulin, stabbed another to death in April 1805, and was tried and hanged for murder in Halifax. The prisoners also maintained their own Grand Council (Grand Conseil) with which to impose discipline, though with a different focus than the British: anyone who disclosed a planned escape attempt to the guards was subject to being stoned to death (though historian Brian Cuthbertson disputes the likelihood of this claim). Escapes and attempts were frequent, and attempted escapees were regarded "with high esteem" by the other prisoners. Before 1812, approximately 130 prisoners, including 25 officers, escaped, of whom only 11 were recaptured despite advertised rewards in local newspapers. Many others were either sent to prisons in England or the West Indies, or were released after pledging allegiance to the British Crown. Approximately 1535 French prisoners were incarcerated at Melville between 1803 and 1813, and an unknown number were held during Napoleon's Hundred Days. Sixty-six Frenchmen are known to have died in the prison, ten of whom were prisoners from the Hundred Days. Nine Spanish prisoners also died during this period.

=== War of 1812 ===
The War of 1812 brought an influx of American prisoners to Melville Island; up to 1800 at a time were housed in its barracks or on a nearby 350-person prison ship Magnet. Most of the French prisoners were released or paroled to make room for the Americans, who were seen as more of a risk. David Stickney was the first recorded American prisoner, arriving on 4 July 1812. Early in the war, many Americans were exchanged for British prisoners in Boston or Salem, Massachusetts, in an arrangement known as a "cartel"; 1981 of the captives taken before October 1812 were thus exchanged, while another seventeen, accused of killing a Canadian farmer and raping his wife, were sent to England and imprisoned. African-American captives were never considered for exchange, and were instead commonly released under the 1807 Abolition Act.

By the end of 1812, maps of the peninsula showed a marked increase in buildings: a two-story common prison, a small hospital, officers' quarters, a gunner's house, a turnkey store, fuel sheds, the agent's office and guard house, a bell house, nine sentry boxes, and four oceanside outhouses. Despite this, the facility was severely overcrowded, a problem compounded by attempts at segregating the remaining French prisoners and the few African-Americans from the majority white American population. 2078 prisoners were recorded by the end of 1812, including 1412 privateers and 572 merchant seamen. More than 3000 arrived over the next two years, including nearly 1000 soldiers captured in the Niagara area.

Accounts of prison life vary: Cuthbertson says that the prisoners were "reportedly well treated" but prisoner complaints suggested they were "wretched indeed". Because of the crowded conditions, "the authorities did everything they could to keep the prisoners quiet," including lying to them. Captured privateers were sent to England in large numbers "to harass and distress that description of prisoners". All letters sent to and by prisoners were read. Residents of the Melville prison barracks were lice-infested and slept in tier-hung hammocks (first three, and later four tiers), and their activities were more restricted than those of earlier French prisoners. A strict cleaning regimen was observed in an attempt to promote sanitary conditions, and prisoners could be sent to solitary confinement for uncleanliness. Rations were considered "robust": prisoners were given 0.45 kilograms (1 lb) each of bread and beef and a gill (0.1421 litres) of peas daily.

In October 1812, John Mitchell was appointed as an "American agent" to oversee the treatment of the American prisoners at Melville and to arrange prisoner exchanges. He gave the Americans coffee, sugar, potatoes, tobacco, newspapers, and soap, and also provided money for other purchases. Mitchell was responsible for buying clothing, but lacked the funds to meet demand: in late 1813, almost 1000 of the prisoners were shoeless, and many more had no jackets. Staff at the prison hospital attributed a tuberculosis outbreak to "want of comfortable clothing". Though Mitchell visited Melville Island regularly, he was primarily concerned with speaking to the officers, not the common prisoners. Mitchell was removed in October 1814 in retaliation for the treatment of the British prisoner agent, Thomas Barclay, by the United States government.

Despite the conditions in the prison, the Americans continued the French tradition of establishing shops within the prison. Goods sold included cigars and smuggled rum. Gambling was a popular pastime, particularly backgammon and other dice games, as well as dancing, singing, and storytelling. One prisoner was able to counterfeit Spanish coins, which found their way into the Halifax economy. On Sundays, church services were conducted and visitors were allowed, though many visiting Haligonians were United Empire Loyalists who came "to gratify their eyes ... with sight of what they called 'rebels' ".

The 320 American survivors of the capture of USS Chesapeake in 1813 were interned on Melville Island and their ship, renamed HMS Chesapeake, was used to ferry prisoners from Melville to England's Dartmoor Prison. Many officers were paroled to Halifax, but some began a riot at a performance of a patriotic song about Chesapeake's defeat. Parole restrictions were tightened: beginning in 1814, paroled officers were required to attend a monthly muster on Melville Island, and those who violated their parole were confined to the prison. After foiled escape plots in 1813 and 1814, fears of a mass escape led to increased security and a 600-prisoner transport to England. Around this time, Lieutenant William Miller, who had been in charge of the prisoners, was replaced by Captain J. Crochet; Miller had been noted for his rudeness, including one occasion when he told the prisoners to "die and be damned, as there is one hundred and fifty acres of land to bury you in, God damn you." He had also been accused of cruelty by American newspapers, though some prisoners defended him and the veracity of the media claims is questionable.

By the decommissioning, over 10,000 French, Spanish and American prisoners had been held at the prison. The majority were Americans: there were 8,148 recorded US prisoners, 3,542 of whom were privateers from the 92 such ships brought to Halifax.

Of the American prisoners held on Melville Island during the war, 195 died, mostly from fevers and pneumonia – a death rate of two per cent. Prisoners at Melville Island had a lower death rate than most British soldiers serving at frontier posts in North American and the prison's conditions were better than many those endured by British prisoners in POW camps in the United States. Most of the French and American dead were buried on nearby Deadman's Island. James Brooke suggests a burial rate of one per week. The war ended in December 1814, but news of this did not reach Melville until March 1815, during which time about fifty prisoners died. The prisoners were released to "quit Halifax at their own expense", though some were able to find berths on trade ships. All but 120 had left by mid-April; most of those remaining were hospital patients, who were sent to the Naval Hospital in Halifax in early May. Melville Island was decommissioned in May 1815, and its goods, including 1,170 hammocks, were sold at auction in Halifax.

=== Receiving depot ===
Receiving depot, pictured in 1929

After the decommissioning of the military prison, Melville Island was used as a receiving depot for some of the black refugees, the estimated 1600–2000 escaped slaves who arrived in Halifax between 1815 and 1818. In April 1815, seventy-six refugees were moved to Melville from the Halifax Poor House, many ill with smallpox. The refugees were given blankets, "colourful" clothing (often the uniforms of captured or demobilized soldiers), and children's shoes. Rations included pork or beef, potatoes, rice, cornmeal, molasses, spruce beer (to prevent scurvy), and sometimes coffee. To discourage men from leaving their families at the depot as they worked in Halifax, rations were only given to heads of families. Thomas Jeffery was granted a salary of £1500 (£113,600 as of 2020) for administering the depot. Eighty-two refugees died during the smallpox outbreak, and 500 were vaccinated to prevent the further spread of the disease. An increasing number passed through Melville Island on their way to Canadian settlements: between 727 and 798 are recorded from April to July 1815. Most of these found work in Halifax or moved to land grants, but some returned the following winter "when in distress". At least 107 of these refugees died on Melville Island. The province's lieutenant-governor ordered that the refugees be moved to Preston or Halifax in May 1816, and put the land up for lease to "a person of unexceptionable character", but no lease is recorded during this period. The hospital was officially closed in June 1816.

Beginning in 1818, Melville Island was used as a quarantine hospital for ill immigrants arriving in Nova Scotia. The hospital was operational for short periods in 1818, 1831, and 1846. By 1829, ten buildings were left on Melville Island, all "in a state of neglect and decay". In 1831, three doctors (Matthias Hoffmann, Samuel Head and John Stirling) were contracted to care for smallpox patients on the island; as "enthusiasm for the temporary hospital was not shared by the poor", only sixteen patients were treated there during this period. In 1847, over 1200 Irish immigrants fleeing the Great Famine were ordered quarantined on Melville Island by the Board of Health; of these, 203 were held in the "fever hospital", and 30 died. Typhus victims were also held at Melville, during which time the medical staff were not allowed to leave for fear of spreading the infection.

Diseases encountered among the immigrants included smallpox, typhus, and yellow fever. There were 37 recorded deaths.

=== British Army ===
1855 sketch of Melville Island

In 1855, Nova Scotia politician Joseph Howe developed a plan to use Melville Island as a recruitment and training centre for American soldiers to fight for the British in the Crimean War. US neutrality laws prevented Americans from participating in overseas wars, so recruiters sent to the US advertised for men to work on the Nova Scotia Railway, and faced arrest if their true purpose was discovered. Upon arrival in Halifax, the men were sent to Melville Island for enlistment and basic training. The first group of 66 men arrived on 6 April 1855, but all refused to join the British Foreign Legion. However, by the end of May there were 71 newly recruited soldiers on the peninsula, and up to 158 total had enlisted. American discontent with the project forced its abandonment in June; the Melville Island depot closed, and the recruits were sent first to Halifax and then to England. Overall the recruitment project enlisted between 500 and 700 men, mostly German and Irish nationals.

After the recruitment project ended, the Admiralty sold the land to the British army for £2800 (£267,500 as of 2020) for use as a military prison. The first 70 prisoners arrived in 1856. At this time, flogging was gradually being phased out as a punishment for military members, who were instead imprisoned under the Mutiny Act 1844; the purchase of Melville Island allowed these prisoners to be removed from the overcrowded Halifax Citadel. A 22-man military guard supervised the prisoners, who were subjected to hard labour: the chief warder imported 500 tonnes (492 long tons; 551 short tons) of granite from Purcell's Cove for them to break. Punishments included solitary confinement or "shot drill", where an inmate was made to carry 11-kilogram (24 lb) cannonballs from one end of the yard to the other. A new 34-cell prison building was constructed in 1884 to alleviate overcrowding. There were some escape attempts during this period, the most violent of which involved the stone hammers used to break stone being repurposed as projectiles and weapons.

British officers from the Halifax garrison conducted inspections of the prison four times per year, and maintenance was carried out either by the prisoners themselves or by soldiers from the Halifax garrison. The prison also housed a schoolroom and chapel, both staffed by army personnel. A new stone prison was built before 1905 next to the older wooden barracks, as well as housing for warders and their families. The new building alleviated reported problems with lack of lighting and ventilation in the previous structure. In December of that year, the Canadian Permanent Force took over wardenship of the prison, at which time there were three remaining prisoners. The land was granted to the Canadian Government as the British left Nova Scotia in 1907. The name was changed in 1909 from "military prison" to "detention barracks", reflecting a shift in attitude towards incarcerated military personnel: inmates were known as detainees, not prisoners, and after their discharge from the military they maintained no permanent criminal record.

=== First and Second World Wars ===
When the First World War began in 1914, Canadian police were given the ability to detain German and Austro-Hungarian nationals, and incarcerate any who refused to agree not to support their homelands in the war. In September, the Spanish ship Monserrat carrying a large number (about 80) of men en route to Germany to report for military service was intercepted by HMS Glory, which brought the ship to Halifax Harbour. Once there, the Germans aboard were taken to Melville Island with a garrison guard, interrogated, and imprisoned under the supervision of the detention barracks staff. Over the next several months, more German nationals were brought to Melville, detained either by British ships or by Canadian police forces. Escape attempts began in October, and a procedure to count prisoners twice daily was instituted in an attempt to prevent them. The anglophone guards often could not communicate with the prisoners or even pronounce their names, resorting to nicknames and complicating efforts in prisoner management. Repairs were made to the prison buildings after several inmates escaped by sawing a hole through the floor of the wooden barracks.

Initially there was no system in place to allow prisoners to send letters; censorship arrangements were made through the Dominion Police in Ottawa, and the American Consul was designated a representative for prisoner welfare. As the war progressed, groups of detainees were transferred to and from other prisons according to their behaviour or level of risk and the number of inmates per institution. After the 1917 Halifax Explosion, prisoners were transferred to the 800-man Amherst Internment Camp at Amherst, Nova Scotia. One of the prisoners transferred may have been Leon Trotsky, although this is disputed.

On 10 April 1935, a fire completely destroyed the old wooden prison barracks, so when the Second World War began in 1939, the remaining prisoners and guards were sent to McNab's Island. Melville Island was used first to confine deserters from the army, then from 1941 as a temporary storage facility for Canadian Army ammunition depots. When VE Day caused riots in downtown Halifax, there were rumours of a plan to break into the depots and deploy hand grenades; a trooper squad was sent to guard against this possibility, but no "invasion" occurred.

=== 1945–present ===
After the end of the Second World War, military activities on Melville ended; the land was initially awarded to the Naval Sailors Association, a decision that prompted some disagreement among members of Parliament. Haligonians pushed for the area to be repurposed for recreation, partially due to anxieties about its use as a storage facility for potentially toxic chemicals. In 1947, the Canadian Army leased Melville Island to the Armdale Yacht Club for Can$1 per year. The club demolished some of the buildings, renovated and expanded others, widened the road, and filled in a new embankment for boating. Further renovations were done in 1952 and the 1960s, adding verandahs to the two clubhouses (one of which dates to 1808 and was used as a warden's house) and remodelling their interiors. Though the club's lease was initially year-to-year, in 1956 it began a 99-year lease from the Department of National Defence. The club dredged Melville Cove, added a "marine railway", and created a large marina, at which dozens of boats are now docked.

== Culture ==
During certain periods, Melville Island was a social destination for Halifax residents. Haligonians visited the "town fair" run by French inmates during the Napoleonic period. The peninsula was called a "great resort of the ladies of Halifax" by an 1855 newspaper. However, from the beginning of the First World War to 1947, visitors to Melville were restricted. Though it was re-opened with the arrival of the Armdale Yacht Club, the area's history was largely forgotten until the 2000 establishment of Deadman's Island Park on the adjacent peninsula.

The peninsula has also been the subject of artistic and literary treatments. A number of writings by Melville prisoners have been preserved, including a diary by François-Lambert Bourneuf and an account credited to Benjamin Waterhouse (though historians are unsure of its true authorship). Politician Joseph Howe wrote a poem describing its use as a military prison. The site's history has been the subject of a book by Brian Cuthbertson, and another by Iris Shea and Heather Watts. The prison is the subject of a painting held by the UK National Trust and a Nova Scotian folk song, among other cultural works.

== Sources ==
- Bourneuf, François Lambert (1990). Diary of a Frenchman: François Lambert Bourneuf's Adventures from France to Acadia, 1787–1871. Deveau, J Alphonse (trans). Nimbus Publishing. ISBN 978-0-921054-42-9.
- Colombo, John Robert (2011). Fascinating Canada: A Book of Questions and Answers. Dundurn Press. ISBN 978-1-55488-923-5.
- Cuthbertson, Brian (2009). Melville Prison & Deadman's Island: American and French Prisoners of War in Halifax 1794–1816. Formac Press. ISBN 978-0-88780-837-1.
- Harris, R Cole; Matthews, Geoffrey J (1987). Historical Atlas of Canada. Vol. 1. University of Toronto Press. ISBN 978-0-8020-2495-4.
- Marble, A (1993). Surgeons, Smallpox, and the Poor: A History of Medicine and Social Conditions in Nova Scotia, 1749–1799. McGill-Queen's University Press. ISBN 978-0-7735-6385-8.
- Maybank, Blake (2005). Birding Sites of Nova Scotia. Nimbus Publishing. ISBN 978-1-55109-519-6.
- Regan, John W (1908). Sketches and Traditions of the Northwest Arm. McAlpine.
- Schneider, Carl and Dorothy (2007). Slavery in America. Infobase. ISBN 978-1-4381-0813-1.
- Shea, Iris; Watts, Heather (2005). Deadman's: Melville Island & its Burial Ground. Glen Margaret Publishing. ISBN 978-0-920427-68-2.
- Waterhouse, Benjamin (2010). Prisoner of the British. Fireship Press. ISBN 978-1-935585-82-4.
- Watts, Heather; Raymond, Michele (2003). Halifax's Northwest Arm: An Illustrated History. Formac Press. ISBN 978-0-88780-606-3.
