= Dartmouth Yacht Club =

Yacht club in Dartmouth, Nova Scotia

Coordinates: 44°42′4″N 63°36′37.6″W

- Abbreviation: DYC
- Formation: 1962
- Legal status: active
- Purpose: advocate and public voice, educator and network for recreational and competitive sailors, coaches, volunteers and events
- Location: 697 Windmill Road, Dartmouth, Halifax Regional Municipality, Nova Scotia Canada
- Official language: English, French
- Affiliations: Canadian Canoe Association, Britannia Yacht Club
- Website: DYC.ns.ca

The Dartmouth Yacht Club is a yacht club located in Wright's Cove in Halifax Harbour's Bedford Basin, next to Burnside Industrial Park in Dartmouth, Nova Scotia, Canada. The club has a history dating to 1962.

== Partnerships ==
The DYC has reciprocal agreements with other yacht clubs, e.g. Britannia Yacht Club and Armdale Yacht Club.

== See also ==
- Armdale Yacht Club
