= Harbour cleanup =

Harbour cleanup may refer to:

- Halifax Harbour Solutions
- Saint John, New Brunswick harbour cleanup
- Boston Harbor pollution and cleanup efforts
