= Halifax Harbour =

Harbour in Nova Scotia, Canada

Coordinates: 44.62°N 63.55°W

Map of Halifax Harbour

Halifax Harbour is a large natural harbour on the Atlantic coast of Nova Scotia, Canada, located in the Halifax Regional Municipality. Halifax largely owes its existence to the harbour, being one of the largest and deepest ice-free natural harbours in the world. Before Confederation it was one of the most important commercial ports on the Atlantic seaboard. In 1917, it was the site of the world's largest man-made accidental explosion, when the SS Mont-Blanc blew up in the Halifax Explosion on December 6.

The harbour was formed by a drowned glacial valley which succumbed to sea level rise after glaciation. The Sackville River now empties into the upper end of the harbour in Bedford Basin. The harbour also includes the Northwest Arm and The Narrows, a constricted passage to Bedford Basin.

Halifax Harbour has been polluted as a result of two centuries of direct raw sewage discharge into its waters. Health concerns in the 1990s caused the shut-down of all harbour beaches. The Harbour Solutions project, initiated in the year 2000, was a CA$400 million project which attempted to remediate the area, with limited success.

== Harbour description ==
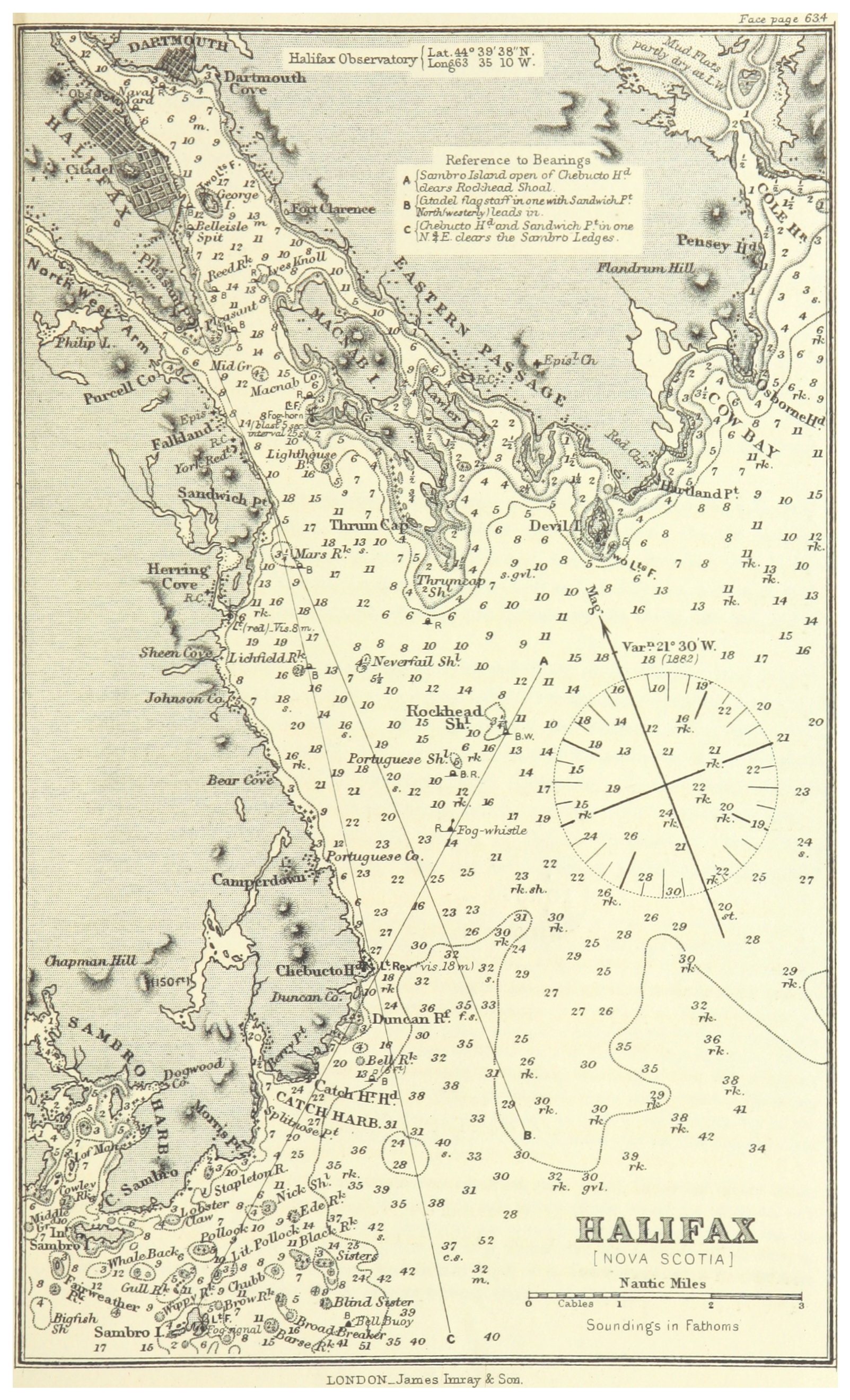
Nautical chart of Halifax Harbour in the 1880s

The Mi'kmaq First Nation, long the occupants of this territory, called the harbour Kjipuktuk in their language. It was transliterated in English as "Chebucto". It runs in a northwest–southeast direction.

Based on average vessel speeds, the harbour is strategically located approximately one hour's sailing time north of the Great Circle Route between the Eastern Seaboard and Europe. As such, it is the first inbound and last outbound port of call in eastern North America with transcontinental rail connections.

The harbour is largely formed by a drowned glacial valley which succumbed to sea level rise since glaciation. The Sackville River now empties into the upper end of the harbour in Bedford Basin; however, its original river bed has been charted by the Canadian Hydrographic Service throughout the length of the harbour and beyond.

The harbour includes the following geographic areas:

- Northwest Arm: Another drowned river valley now used largely by pleasure boats.
- The Narrows: A constricted passage to Bedford Basin.
- Bedford Basin: A sheltered bay and the largest part of the harbour.

=== Islands ===
The harbour is home to several small islands.

The harbour limit is formed by the northern end of its largest island - McNabs Island. The largest island entirely within the harbour limits is Georges Island, a glacial drumlin similar to its dryland counterpart at Citadel Hill. Several small islands are located in the Bedford Basin near Bedford and Burnside.

In the Northwest Arm is a small peninsula known as Deadman's Island, named for being the burial location of War of 1812 prisoners of war. Just 200 m west of Deadman's Island is the equally small Melville Island, which is connected to the mainland by road. Melville Island forms the eastern boundary of Melville Cove and is also the location of the Armdale Yacht Club. An adjacent residential community named itself after the cove.

Although outside the defined harbour limits, Lawlor Island and Devils Island are also frequently included in descriptions of Halifax Harbour and the surrounding area.

== Navigation ==
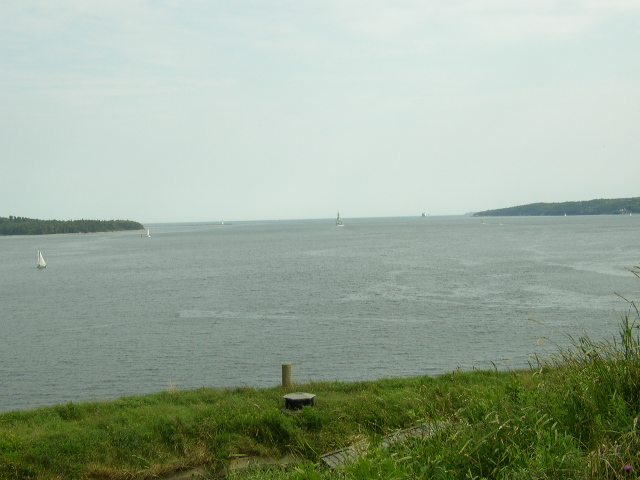
Entrance to Halifax Harbour as seen from Georges Island

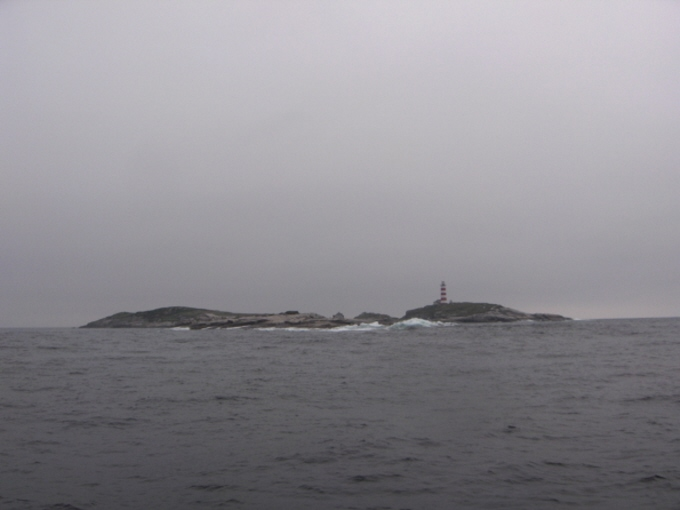
Sambro Island from the northwest

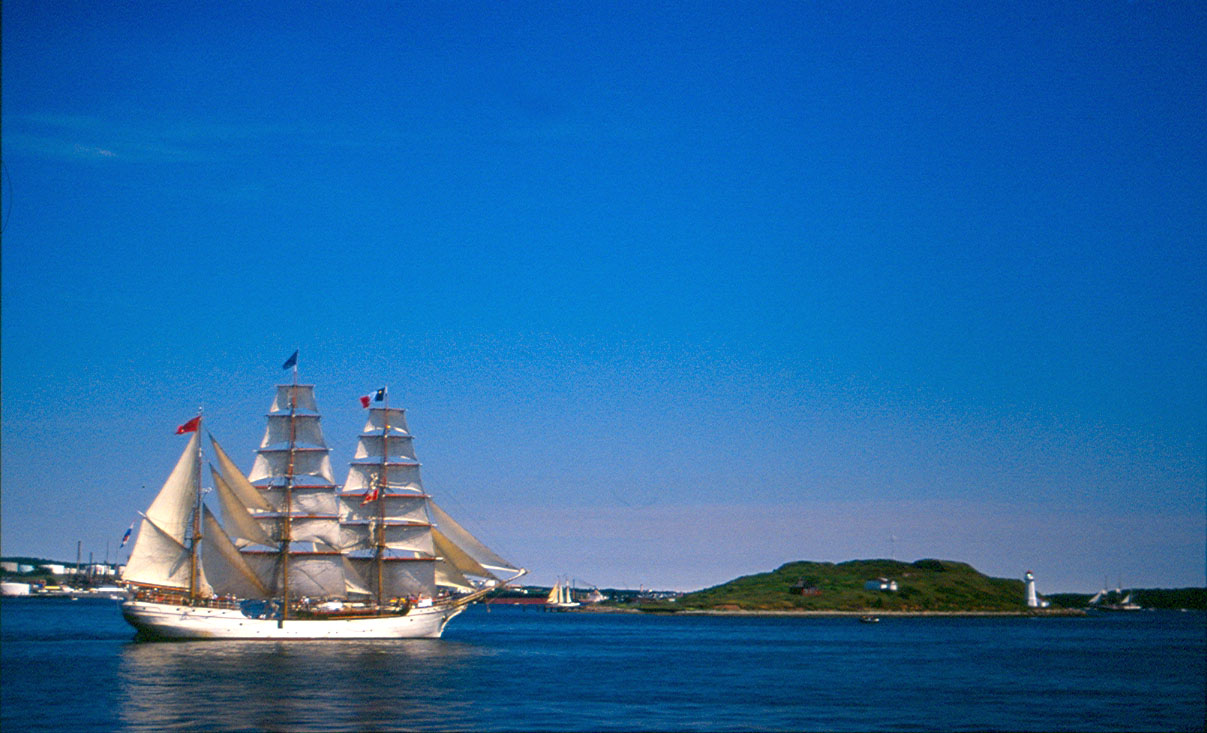
The barque Europa beside Georges Island in Halifax Harbour in 2004

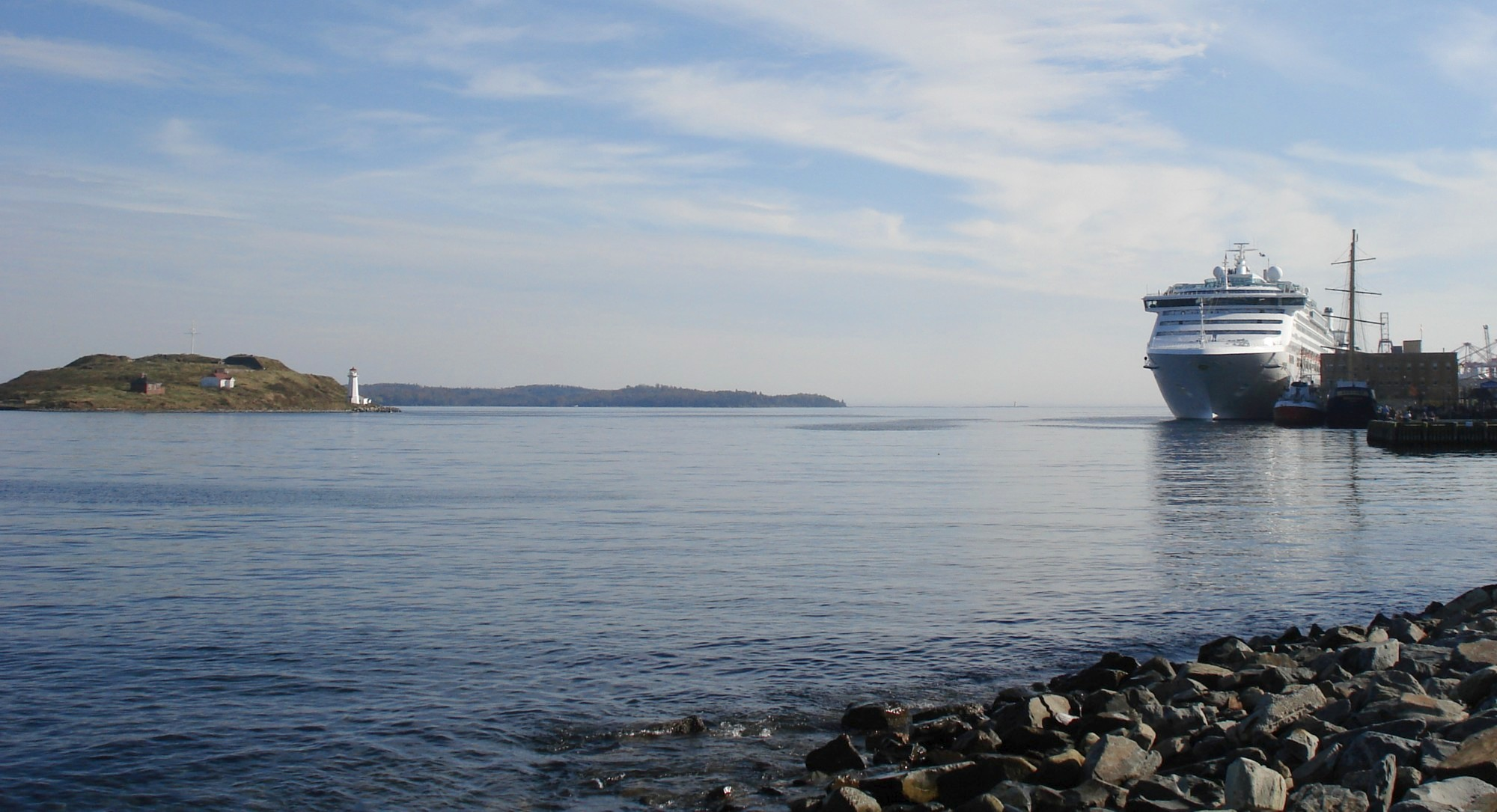
Facing mouth of Harbour, Georges Island on left, McNabs Island in centre, and cruise ship Sea Princess moored on right.

Halifax's official harbour limit for navigational purposes is delineated by a line running from Herring Cove on the west side of the main channel, to the northern end of McNabs Island, then from McNabs Island across the Eastern Passage to the actual community of Eastern Passage on the east side of the island. The harbour is marked by an extensive network of buoys and lighthouses, starting with Sambro Island Lighthouse at the harbour approaches, the oldest operating lighthouse in North America.

Deep draught vessels must use the main channel into the harbour, which runs on the west side of McNabs Island. The west entrance point marking the beginning of the inner approach using this channel is located near Chebucto Head, approximately 12 kilometres (7 mi) south of the limit.

Shallow draught vessels (less than 2.5 metres, 8.2 ft) may use the Eastern Passage, which runs on the east side of McNabs Island; however, continuous silting makes charted depths unreliable.

Large vessels have compulsory pilotage, with harbour pilots boarding at the pilot station off Chebucto Head. Vessels wishing to transit The Narrows between the outer harbour and Bedford Basin must travel one at a time; this rule was established after the disastrous Halifax Explosion of December 6, 1917, when a collision between the French munitions ship Mont-Blanc and the Norwegian ship Imo destroyed part of Halifax and Dartmouth.

The Royal Canadian Navy maintains a large base housing Maritime Forces Atlantic along the western side of The Narrows, as well as an ammunition depot on the northeastern shore of Bedford Basin, CFAD Bedford. There are strict security regulations relating to vessels navigating near Navy facilities and anchorages.

There are two large suspension bridges crossing The Narrows:

- the Angus L. Macdonald Bridge, opened in 1955
- the A. Murray MacKay Bridge, opened in 1970

== Port facilities ==
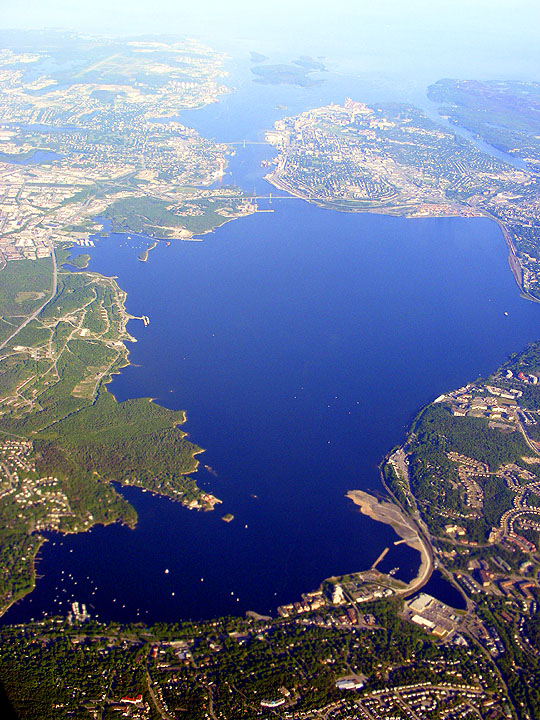
Halifax Harbour from the air looking South. Bedford is seen in the foreground, the Halifax Peninsula on the right, and Dartmouth on the left.

After Confederation in 1867, boosters of Halifax expected federal help to make the city's natural harbour Canada's official winter port and a gateway for trade with Europe. Halifax's advantages included its location just off the Great Circle route made it the closest to Europe of any mainland North American port. But the new Intercolonial Railway (ICR) took an indirect, southerly route for military and political reasons, and the national government made little effort to promote Halifax as Canada's winter port. Ignoring appeals to nationalism and the ICR's own attempts to promote traffic to Halifax, most Canadian exporters sent their wares by train though Boston or Portland. Harbour promoters fought an uphill battle to finance the large-scale port facilities Halifax lacked, succeeding just before the First World War with the start of construction of the large docking facilities at Ocean Terminals in Halifax's South End. The war at last boosted Halifax's harbour into prominence on the North Atlantic.

The Halifax Port Authority is a federally appointed agency which administers and operates various port properties on the harbour. Previously run by the National Harbours Board, the HPA is now a locally run organization.

HPA facilities include:

- South End Container Terminal - Piers 36-42 (currently operated by Halterm Limited, with several gantry and post-Panamax cranes)
- Halifax Grain Elevator
- Ocean Terminals - Piers 23-34
- Piers 20 -22: Pier 20, Halifax Seaport Farmers Market, The Cruise Ship Pavilion and Pier 21 Museum
- Richmond Terminals - Piers 9 and 9A
- Richmond Offshore Terminals - Piers 9B-9D (multi-user supply base for offshore oil and gas exploration/production)
- Fairview Cove Container Terminal - (currently operated by Cerescorp)
- National Gypsum Wharf - (currently operated by National Gypsum to serve Wrights Cove gypsum terminal)
- Woodside Atlantic Wharf - (vessel lay-up and repair, oil platform servicing)
- Imperial Oil Wharves - (currently operated by Imperial Oil to serve Dartmouth refinery)
- Ultramar Oil Wharves - (currently operated by Ultramar to serve the petroleum storage facility)
- Eastern Passage Autoport - (currently operated by CN)

All HPA facilities are serviced by CN. It provides on-dock daily train service to Montreal, Toronto, Detroit and Chicago. The railway also operates the Halifax Intermodal Terminal (HIT) adjacent to the Richmond Terminals.

In addition to HPA facilities, the following users have port facilities:

- The Halifax Shipyard, operated by Irving Shipbuilding, a medium-sized vessel construction and repair yard operates on the north end of the Halifax side of the harbour. The yard contains a graving dock and various shore-based operations.
- Until 2003 a marine railway called the Dartmouth Marine Slips operated in Dartmouth Cove until replaced by high rise residential development.
- MARLANT operates the HMC Dockyard, Dockyard Annex, CFAD Bedford, and York Redoubt through CFB Halifax. There are also military docking facilities located adjacent to the Shearwater Heliport.
- Canadian Coast Guard operated CCG Base Dartmouth, housing part of the Atlantic and Arctic fleets as well as pollution response and navigation aids maintenance facilities, until it was closed by 2012. All operations and vessels were shifted to BIO further north in the harbour. The old base was transferred to the provincial government and is now operated as the COVE.
- Bedford Institute of Oceanography maintains docking facilities for various government scientific vessels. Shannon Hill, above the BIO campus is also home to CCG's "Halifax Marine Communications and Traffic Services" which operates Halifax Coast Guard Radio and the Vessel Traffic Services (VTS) centre ("Halifax Traffic"), providing continuous radar coverage of all harbour activity.
- There are several marinas on the harbour:
  - Armdale Yacht Club (Northwest Arm)
  - Bedford Basin Yacht Club (Bedford)
  - Dartmouth Yacht Club (Wrights Cove)- Burnside
  - Royal Nova Scotia Yacht Squadron (Northwest Arm)
  - Shearwater Yacht Club (Shearwater)
  - St. Mary's Boat Club (Northwest Arm)
  - Waegwoltic Club (Northwest Arm)
- There are two automated Weather stations within the harbour
  - McNabs Island
  - Weather buoy Station 44258

== Pollution ==
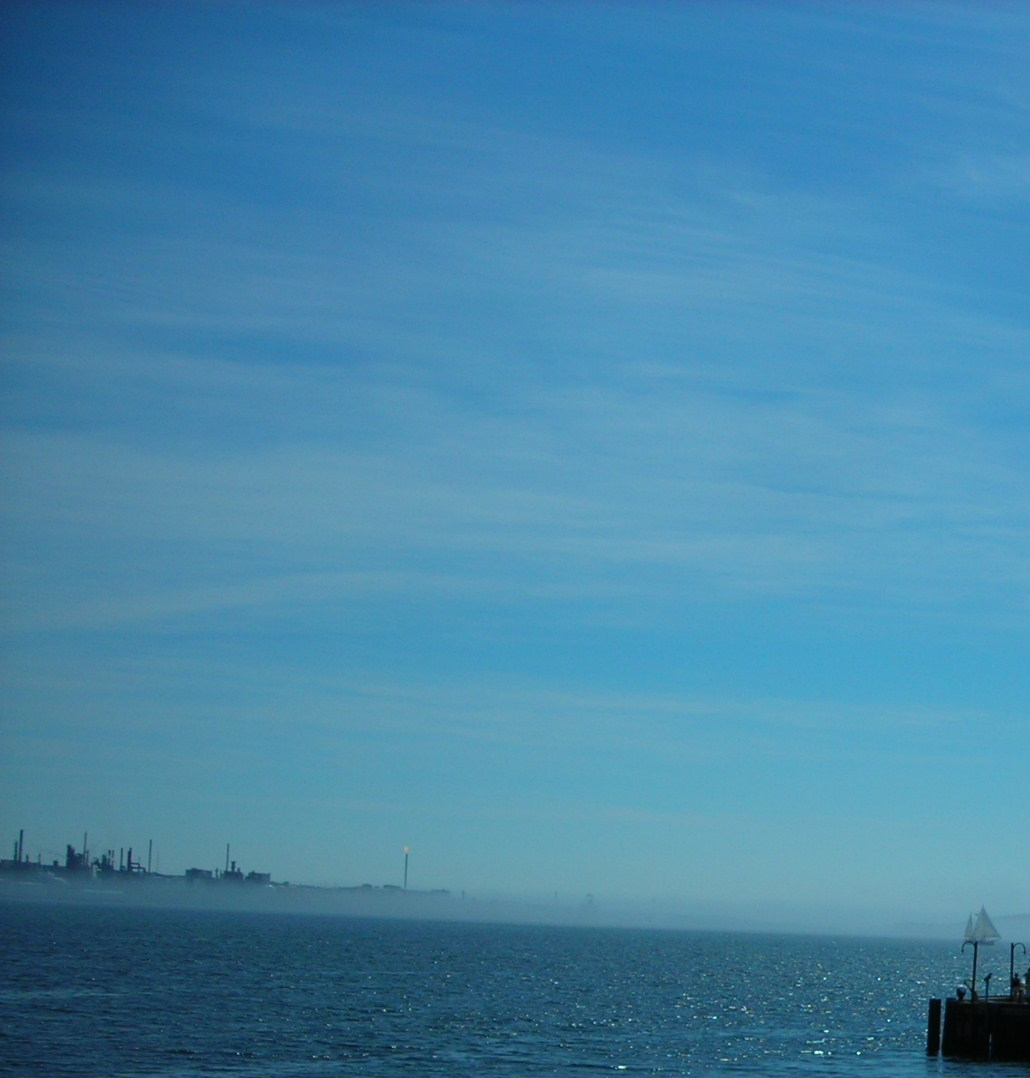
Fog creeping into the Halifax Harbour on a sunny day.

Halifax Harbour has long been polluted as a result of two centuries of direct raw sewage discharge into its waters. The harbour's deep water, tidal dispersal of surface wastes and a relatively small population of the city of Halifax resulted in the harbour's presenting few health concerns until the late 20th century when sewage build-up caused the shut-down of all harbour beaches.

The Harbour Solutions project, initiated in the year 2000, was the culmination of three decades of discussion and planning regarding how the urban area would solve the expensive problem of sewage treatment and disposal. The CA$400 million project was expected to be completed in late 2008 when the final of three new treatment plants was opened.

Testing of harbour waters in July 2008, with two of the three sewage treatment plants on-line, indicated that they are safe for swimming. Municipal public beaches at Black Rock Beach in Point Pleasant Park and at the Dingle Beach in Sir Sandford Fleming Park were officially re-opened on Saturday, August 2, 2008 (Natal Day weekend) after a 30-year closure due to sewage contamination in the water. Lifeguards are now providing supervision during regular hours through to Labour Day weekend. However repeated breakdowns in the new system have resulted in swimming bans being regularly re-imposed and periodic resumption of raw sewage discharge. From early 2009 on swimming was no longer allowed in the harbour because the plant flooded and stopped working. On the weekend of July 4, 2010, some beaches (like Black Rock Beach) reopened.

== Shipwrecks ==
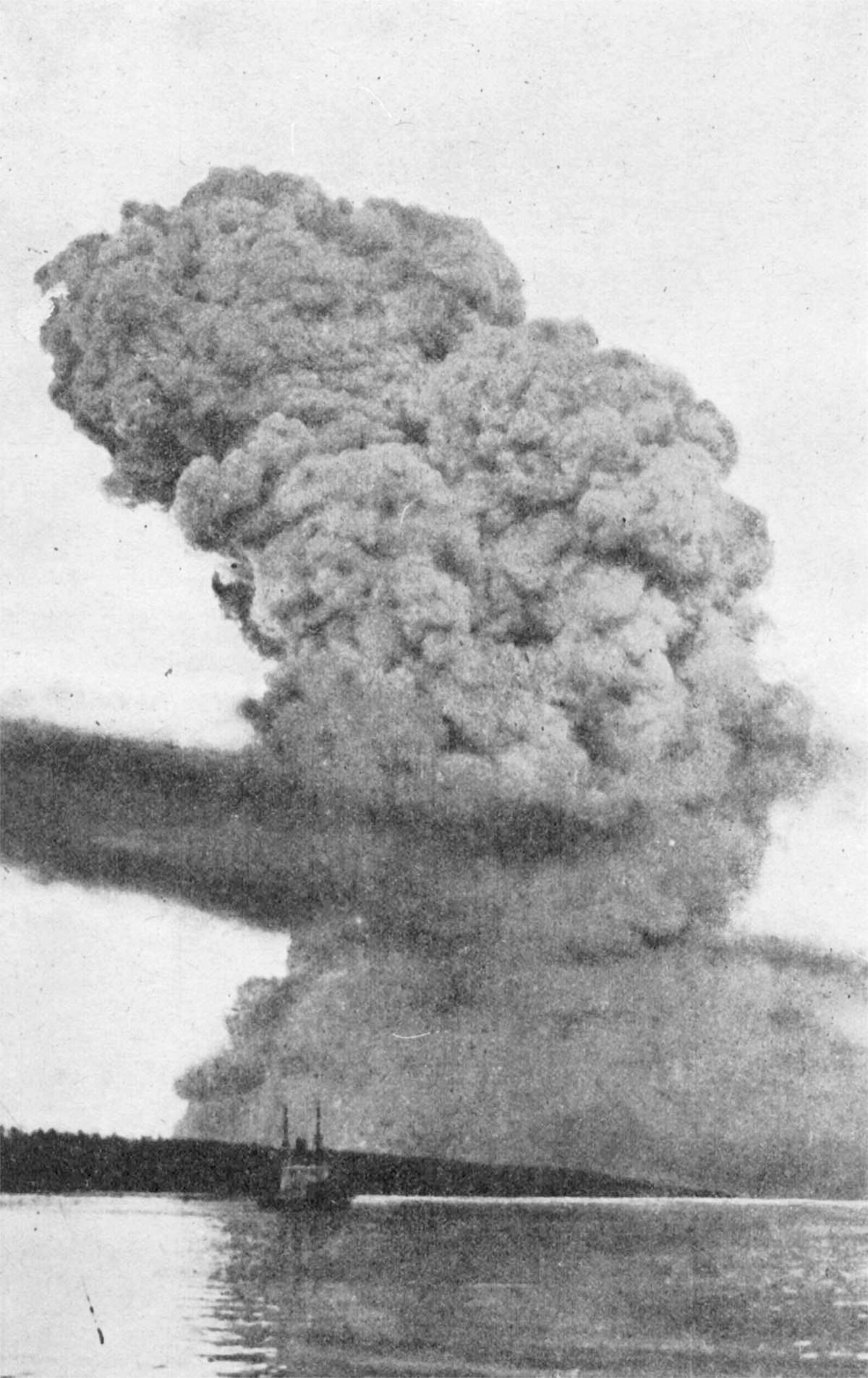
Halifax Explosion blast cloud caused after two ships collided

Halifax Harbour is noted for many shipwrecks both in the inner and outer harbour. A few ships were sunk at the edge of the harbour approaches during World War II by German U-boats but the vast majority were claimed by harbour accidents. Mapping of the harbour revealed about 45 shipwrecks in the harbour. Near the mouth of the harbour, over 50 magnetic anomalies have been discovered, most of which also represent shipwrecks with many others buried underneath the muddy sediments. All historic shipwrecks in Halifax Harbour are protected by Nova Scotia's Special Places Act which makes it illegal to remove artifacts without a permit. Noteworthy wrecks are listed chronologically (with sinking dates):

- SS Havana, April 26, 1906: Rammed by the steamer Strathcona, at night while anchored.
- Deliverance, June 15, 1917
- SS Mont-Blanc blown up in the Halifax Explosion of December 6, 1917, the world's largest man-made accidental explosion. Fragments remain.
- Good Hope, March 16, 1929
- Kaaparen, June 14, 1942: Collision while forming a convoy.
- Erg, July 6, 1943: shipyard tug sunk by collision in Bedford Basin, 19 lives lost.
- Governor Cornwallis, December 22, 1944, by fire
- HMCS Clayoquot, December 24, 1944
- Barge in Bedford Basin as the result of the Bedford Magazine Explosion of July 18, 1945.
- Athelviking, torpedoed by the German submarine U-1232 on January 14, 1945.
- SS British Freedom, sunk the same day as Athelviking by U-1232.
- Gertrude de Costa, March 18, 1950

== See also ==
- List of deepest natural harbours
