= Deadman's Island (Nova Scotia) =

Peninsula in Nova Scotia, Canada

Coordinates: 44°38′05″N 63°36′41″W

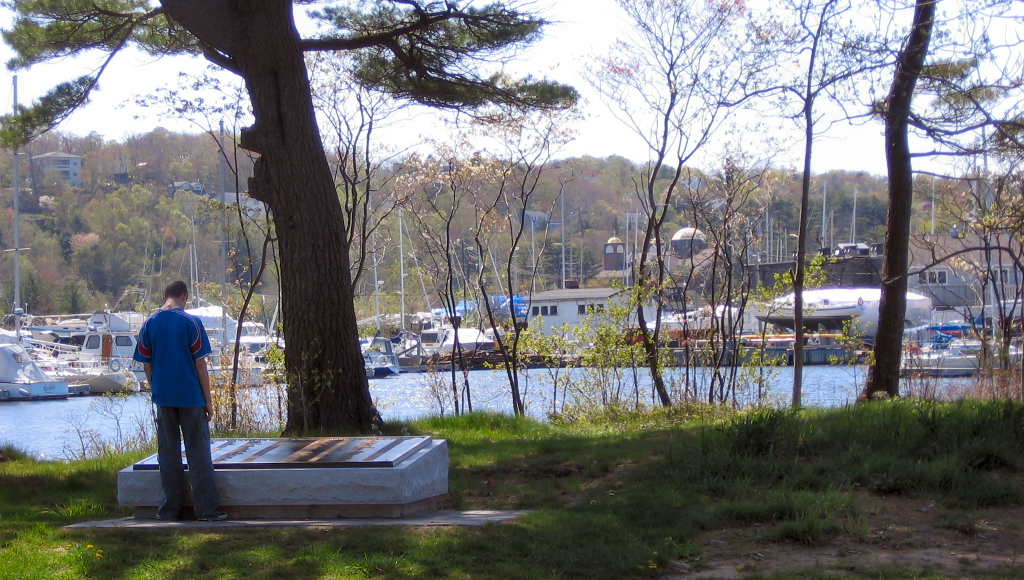
A visitor reads a plaque on Deadman's Island which commemorates 195 American servicemen who died in captivity at a nearby prison on Melville Island during the War of 1812.

Deadman's Island is a small peninsula containing a cemetery and park located in the Northwest Arm of Halifax Harbour in Nova Scotia, Canada. The area was first used as a training grounds for the British military, and later became a burial ground for dead prisoners of war from nearby Melville Island. In the early 1900s the site became an amusement park before being annexed to the city of Halifax in the 1960s. Though development projects were considered for the site, these plans met with popular protest, and instead Deadman's Island became a heritage park, Deadman's Island Park.

== Geography ==
Despite its name, Deadman's Island is not an island at all, but a peninsula that protrudes into the Northwest Arm of Halifax Harbour 200 metres (660 ft) east of Melville Island. Connected to the mainland by a thin wedge of land, it is a "swampy spit...surmounted by a piney knoll". The cove on its eastern side, characterized as "likely areas for the discovery of pre-Contact remains," supports a significant fish population.

== Military use ==
It was first known as "Target Island" or "Target Hill" after use by the British Navy for target practice. The land was used by the British military during the Napoleonic Wars and War of 1812 for interring prisoners of war from a prison on nearby Melville Island. Sixty-six French, nine Spanish, and 195 American soldiers and sailors died at the facility and were buried in canvas bags in unmarked graves, thus giving the island its name.

Deadman's Island may also have been used to bury some of the escaped slaves who came to Melville Island after 1813, at least 104 of whom died, and the Irish immigrants quarantined on Melville in 1847, of whom 30 died. However, after 1847 burials were no longer conducted on the island, despite Melville Island's continued use as a prison or detention centre. There was only one known marked grave on Deadman's Island, that of Canadian mariner John Dixon; he was buried in 1847 by the VII King's Foot with a temporary marker, which was "renewed" in 1895 by the 1st Royal Berkshire Regiment. According to a local legend, Dixon had fallen in love with the daughter of a British colonel, who upon discovering their romance had him sent to Melville Island prison where he committed suicide; however, this story is likely false.

== Park ==
The British sold Deadman's Island to Charles Longley, a Canadian businessman, in 1907. He built an amusement park known as Melville Park for the children of cottagers on the shore of Melville Cove, and established a ferry system across the Northwest Arm to service the park. The boat fare included free admission to the park seven days per week. Activities offered included swings, slides, dancing on Tuesday and Thursday nights, and "water sports" on Saturdays. A large pavilion was built to host these activities, and included space for boat storage and an upper-level dance hall. Three skulls unearthed during the digging of a berry patch were placed on the rafters in one room to frighten "the bravest of the visitors". Though the park was initially popular, the onset of the First World War, the 1917 Halifax Explosion, and the economic downturn in the 1920s resulted in financial problems and finally foreclosure in 1927. In 1936 Longley presented John Dixon's grave marker to the Nova Scotia Provincial Museum.

In 1930 A.J. Davis bought Deadman's Island and reopened it to visitors as a "pleasure park". The Ryan family took over most of the land in the late 1930s. However, storms and development projects began to uncover skeletons; in 1959 local resident Edward Bowness found a skull "frozen into the bank" near his home. The lack of surviving grave markers made determining the location of gravesites difficult.

== Historic site ==
In the late 1960s the land was annexed to the city of Halifax, but a proposed high-rise apartment met with protest from the Northwest Arm Community Planning Association. Though a counterproposal to rezone the site as parkland was rejected, development on Deadman's Island itself did not proceed. However, by the 1990s the land was "effectively the last piece of undeveloped waterfront land on the Northwest Arm." Condominium units were proposed in 1998, and were again met with protest from community associations. The Northwest Arm Heritage Association began a project to catalogue the prisoners buried on the site and was joined in their efforts by related societies throughout the Maritimes and New England, culminating in a request that the municipality recognize Deadman's Island as a heritage property. The issue was broadcast internationally, receiving mention in The Globe and Mail, The New York Times and the Boston Globe, among others. The city hired historian Brian Cuthbertson to evaluate the heritage claim, and his report concluded that the site could hold as many as 400 bodies (in contrast with the 35 suggested by the developer's preliminary survey). The city also saw the site as a potential attraction for American tourists, much like the nearby memorials to victims of the Titanic disaster.

The development application was withdrawn in late 1998, and in February 2000 Deadman's Island Park was established by the Halifax Regional Municipality to protect the site and commemorate its historic significance. A memorial service for the American Prisoners of War buried there was held 23 June of that year by members of the U S 164th Civil Engineering Sqn, Tennessee Air National Guard, Memphis, TN. They being the first U S Service Members to Honor those buried in unmarked graves there.

A large plaque was installed on 30 May 2005 to memorialize the unmarked graves of the American servicemen. The plaque dedication was attended by an Honor Guard from USS Constitution in Boston.

== Deadman's Island Park ==
Deadman's Island Park
- Interactive map of Deadman's Island Park
- Type: Public park
- Location: Halifax, Nova Scotia
- Created: 2005
- Operator: Halifax Regional Municipality

Deadman's Island Park is a Canadian urban park located on Deadman's Island in the Northwest Arm of Halifax Harbour in Nova Scotia's Halifax Regional Municipality.

The park was created in 2005 to protect the property from development as it is the location of the unmarked graves of 195 American soldiers and sailors who died in British captivity during the War of 1812 at a prison on nearby Melville Island.

An interpretive plaque in the park contains the following anonymous poem:

Go view the graves which prisoners fill

Go count them on the rising hill

No monumental marble shows

Whose silent dust does there repose.

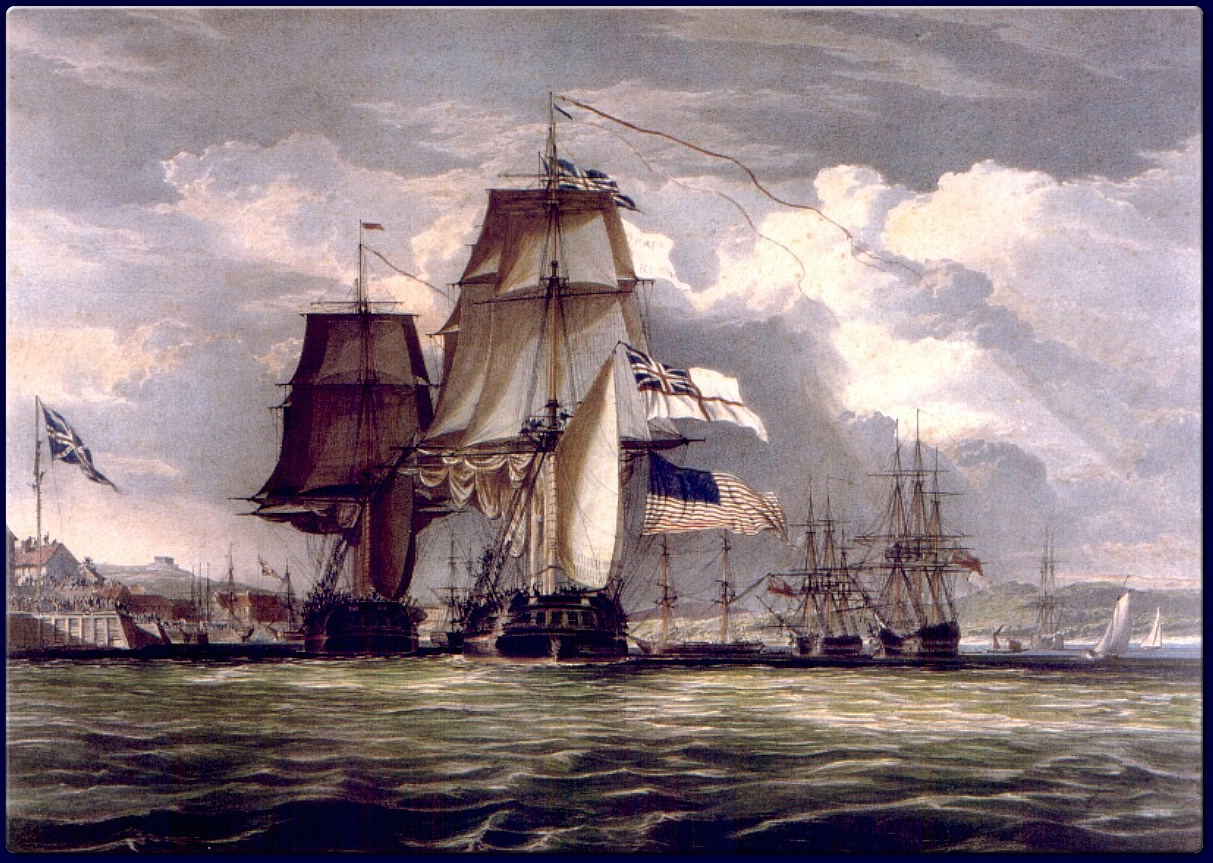
Shannon leads Chesapeake into Halifax. American Crew imprisoned on Deadman's Island, Halifax

The dead were among the more than 8,000 American captives imprisoned for various periods of time on Melville Island, now part of the Armdale Yacht Club. French and Spanish prisoners of war were also buried on the island but their graves are unmarked. Details of the unmarked graves of Deadman's Island had been lost to time but interest was rekindled through research after the owner of the property proposed to develop it for residential use. The property was subsequently acquired by the Municipality as a result of the collaborative efforts of the Northwest Arm Heritage Association, the Ohio Society of the War of 1812 and the Royal Canadian Legion.

On May 30, 2005, the US government erected a memorial tablet to commemorate the men interred there, which lists each man, his rank, and the ship on which he served. Those interred include men who served in the USS Chesapeake, one of the six original United States frigates that was captured by the British and brought to Halifax as a prize.
