= Melville Cove, Halifax =

Human settlement in Nova Scotia, Canada

Coordinates: 44°37′54″N 63°37′40″W

Melville Cove is a residential subdivision in Armdale on Mainland Halifax within the Halifax Regional Municipality Nova Scotia on the shore of the Northwest Arm in Halifax Harbour .
