= Matthias Hoffmann =

Canadian physician (c. 1780 – 1851)

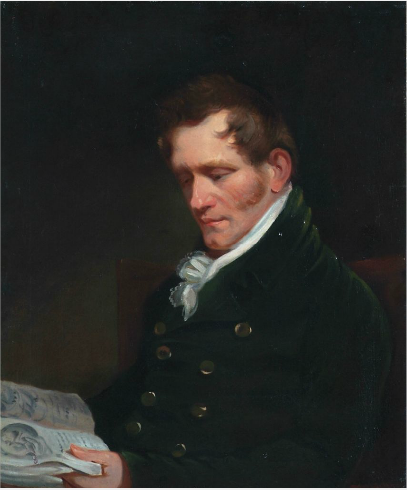
- Born: c. 1780 likely Italy
- Died: 3 April 1851
- Occupations: Medical doctor and health officer

Matthias Hoffmann (c. 1780 – 3 April 1851) was a Canadian medical doctor and health officer.

Hoffmann was likely born in Italy. He served as a medical assistant and surgeon with the Royal Navy before settling in Nova Scotia in 1811, working with prisoners of war at Melville Island. Also in 1811 he married Charlotte Mansfield, with whom he would have eight children. He left the navy in 1815 and began working in private practice.

He returned to Melville Island in 1831 as one of three physicians operating a quarantine hospital during an outbreak of smallpox. This marked the beginning of his involvement in public health: during a later cholera outbreak he was appointed to the new role of "health warden", the duties of which "ranged from supervising the cleaning of yards to the removal of the ill to the cholera hospitals". In 1840 he was appointed health officer after the incumbent died of typhus. His tenure was marked by significant struggles around quarantine regulations and management of immigrants. He died in 1851 after contracting typhus from an incoming vessel.

In 1843 he was given the honorary title of surgeon general to the Nova Scotia militia. He was also a founding member of the Halifax Medical Society in 1844.
