= Harbour Solutions =

Canadian public infrastructure project

Coordinates: 44°39′13.3″N 63°34′49.14″W

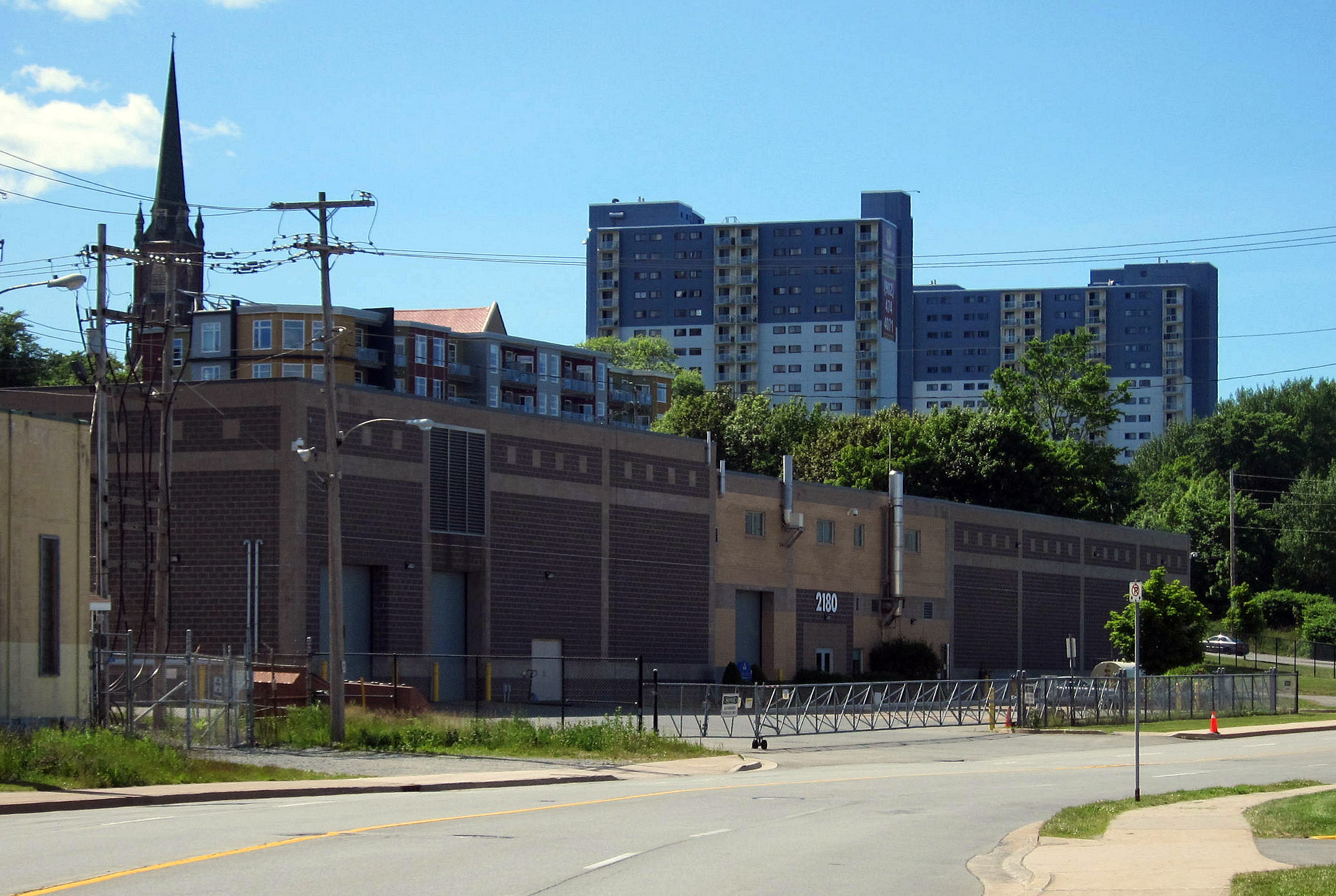
The Halifax Wastewater Treatment Facility north of Downtown Halifax

Harbour Solutions is a Canadian public infrastructure project in Halifax, Nova Scotia.

The CAD $333 million project comprised the construction of three sewage treatment plants and connected various sewage pipe networks with lift stations to treat all sanitary sewage in Halifax and Dartmouth. It was completed in 2010.

== History ==
For two and a half centuries prior to this project, raw sewage was discharged untreated directly into Halifax Harbour. The harbour waters have been the recipient of approximately 200 million litres of untreated raw sewage every day, enough to fill 25 Olympic-size swimming pools. Shellfish harvesting from the harbour and swimming within the harbour have been prohibited for health reasons.

The historic settlements of Halifax and Dartmouth were built with no thought to sewage treatment as a means of waste disposal. Throughout the 19th century, sewers were designed as a single system, with no separation between sanitary sewers, which carried domestic human waste, and stormwater drainage systems. The combined sewers simply emptied into the harbour from dozens of outfalls at the bottom of each street that met the waterfront.

By the mid-20th century, it was clear that the system was not environmentally sustainable. Millions of litres of sewage were dumped into the harbour daily, consisting not only of simple human waste, but of pharmaceuticals, industrial chemicals, fertilizers, and a host of other harmful material.

Sewage treatment plants were proposed for both Halifax and Dartmouth beginning in the 1970s, however, the separate municipalities were never able to reach a consensus for system design and construction. That decade saw the Halifax Regional Water Commission begin to charge its customers a pollution surcharge which was intended to fund such a system. Meanwhile, a host of different provincial and federal governments came and went and overall funding was never finalized. It was only following municipal amalgamation which saw the cities of Halifax and Dartmouth dissolved and merged with all municipalities in Halifax County to form the Halifax Regional Municipality in 1996 that the sewage treatment issue gained necessary traction and moved beyond the planning stage.

== Current project ==
Under the Harbour Solutions Project, a treatment system has been under construction since the early 2000s with three plants being built (one in downtown Halifax, one in downtown Dartmouth, and one in Herring Cove on the southwest side of the harbour) as well as extensive collector piping to close all sewage outfalls into the harbour and redirect sewage into the treatment plants. Total cost of the project is estimated to be approximately CA$333 million. On February 11, 2008, the treatment facility in downtown Halifax officially commenced operation. The Dartmouth plant came online on July 10, 2008 and the Herring Cove plant was expected to open in late fall 2008.

Harbour sewage is also mitigated to a lesser extent by the aforementioned existing plants at Mill Cove, in Bedford and another at Eastern Passage.

== Results ==
The Halifax Regional Municipality announced on July 9, 2008 that the harbour beaches, Black Rock Beach at Point Pleasant Park and the beach at Dingle Park would re-open to swimming on August 2, 2008. Fecal coliform bacteria levels at these locations were either undetectable or at safe levels for swimming. Eleven lifeguards would patrol the beaches. The improved water quality in Halifax Harbour during the summer of 2008 was a direct result of the newly operating Halifax and Dartmouth sewage plants. The clarity of the water improved to the point where the municipal government hired commercial divers to remove debris from the floor of the harbour along the popular boardwalk in the Historic Properties; prior to that summer, the debris was seldom visible due to the opaque water as a result of the untreated sewage.

== 2009 breakdown ==
Repeated breakdowns of the system in 2008 resulted in regular beach closures again and complaints about foul odours and sewage filled basements. A series of technical failures caused a massive failure of the Halifax plant in January 2009, leading to raw sewage being discharged into the harbour.

A Nova Scotia Power electrical outage spurred a technician to activate two backup generators to maintain operation of the plant, but the electrical load was unevenly distributed between the two generators and one became overloaded and failed. A floodgate, designed to close in emergencies to isolate the plant's "wet well" from the deep pipe feeding sewage to the plant, was powered by the overloaded generator. A switch designed to allow the second generator to power the floodgate happened to fail. Owing to the failed generator, only one of the four sewage pumps could convey sewage out of the wet well, and the volume of sewage began to rise, shorting out the electrical junction boxes placed above the pumps. With the floodgate jammed partially open and all four pumps inoperable, the 85-foot-deep wet well filled with sewage. The electrical control room above the wet well then also filled with sewage, destroying all the equipment there.

The incident brought criticism from the federal government and the public, and city officials promised to get the plant back online by Spring 2010. On June 25, 2010, the Halifax Wastewater Treatment Plant was returned to full operation, and it was announced that Black Rock Beach and Dingle Park Beach would be safe for swimming again.

== Sewage discharged ==
Untreated sewage continues to be discharged into Halifax harbour due to severed sewer lines during construction of the new treatment plant.

== See also ==
- Saint John, New Brunswick harbour cleanup
