= Wright's Cove =

Cove in Nova Scotia, Canada

Coordinates: 44°41′49.7″N 63°36′54.2″W

Wright's Cove is a cove on the Dartmouth side of Bedford Basin in Halifax Harbour Nova Scotia Canada within the Halifax Regional Municipality. Located in the cove is the Dartmouth Yacht Club, an Ultramar wharf, a Gypsum loading facility operated by National Gypsum Company and a Canadian Forces armament depot . The cove is sheltered from Bedford Basin by Navy Island and Sheppard's Island. It is the birthplace of George Henry Wright.
