= Northwest Arm (Halifax) =

Inlet in Halifax, Nova Scotia, Canada

Coordinates: 44°38′13.65″N 63°36′30.03″W

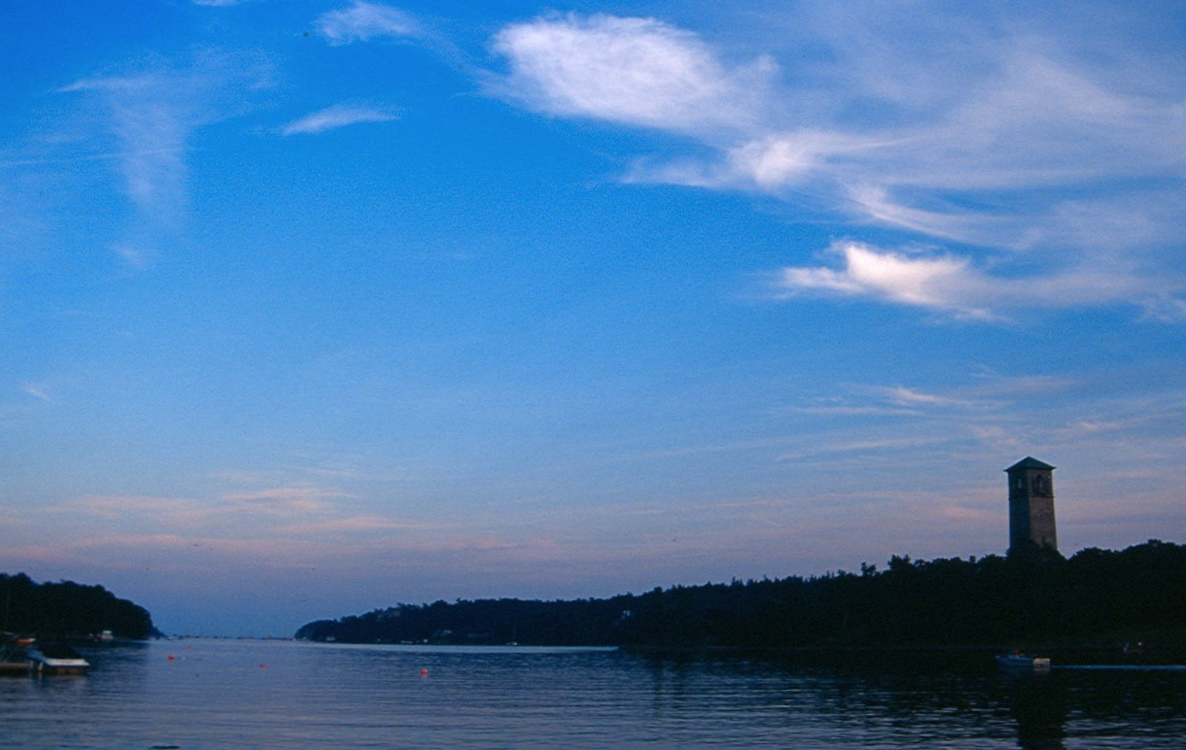
Northwest Arm of Halifax Harbour near sunset, showing the landmark Dingle Memorial Tower on the right.

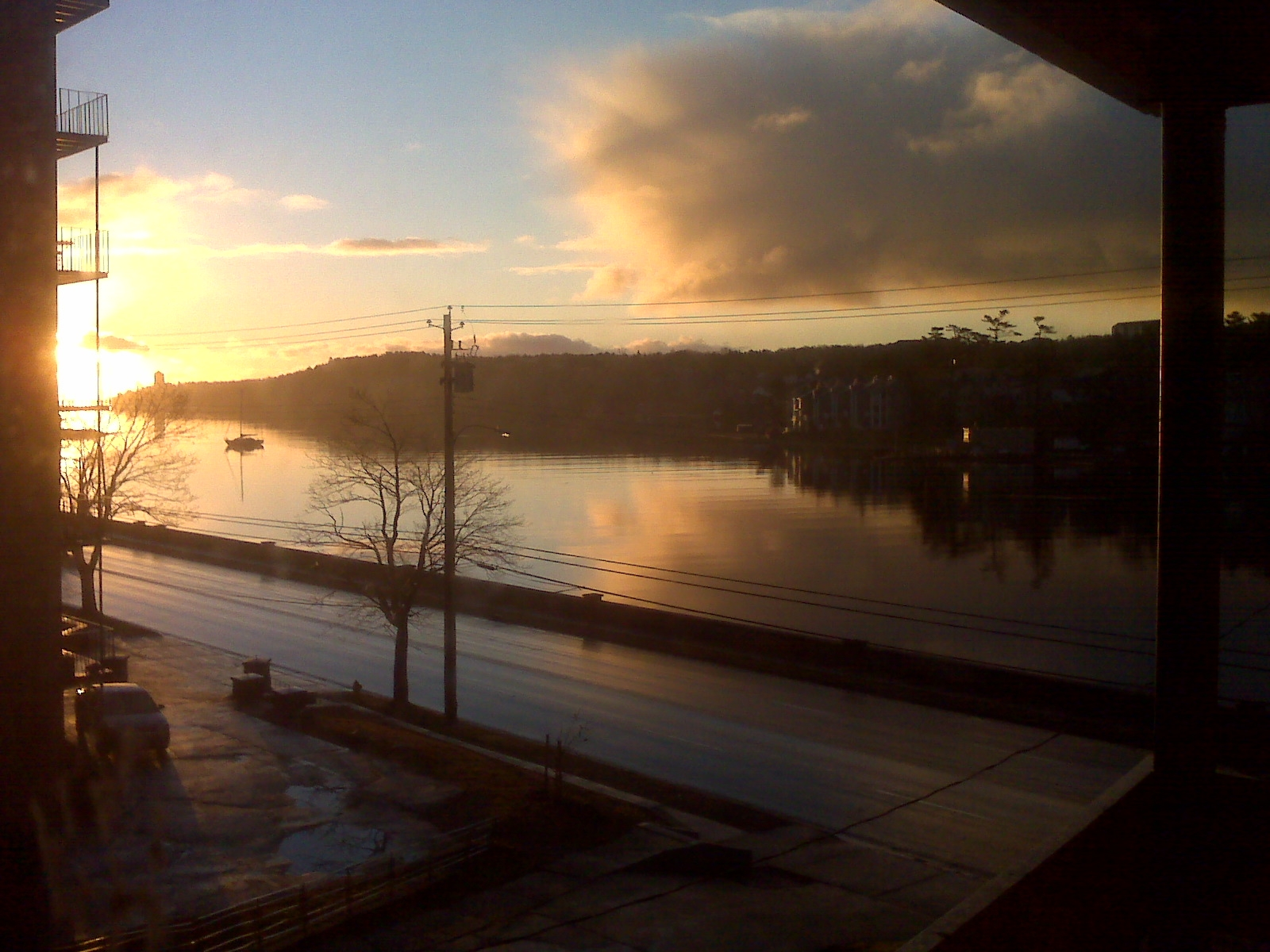
Sunrise on the Northwest arm

The Northwest Arm, originally named Sandwich River, is an inlet in eastern Canada off the Atlantic Ocean in Nova Scotia's Halifax Regional Municipality.

== Geography ==
Part of Halifax Harbour, it measures approximately 3.5 km in length and 0.5 km in width and defines the western side of the Halifax Peninsula. The waterway is oriented along a bearing of 135° (southeast) and 315° (northwest).

The Northwest Arm contains several small islands including Melville Island, home of the Armdale Yacht Club, and Deadman's Island, at the northwestern end near Armdale. There is a large breakwater, constructed from slate bedrock, located adjacent to South Street called the Fyfe Breakwater after the late local naturalist TLC Ratt-Fyfe.

There is a public beach located at Sir Sanford Fleming Park which has only recently been deemed safe for swimming since the Harbor Solutions Project began operations in 2008. There is also a public beach at Horseshoe Island Park located adjacent to Quinpool Road on the Eastern side of the Arm.

== History ==
The Mi'kmaq Nation called this water body "Waygwalteech" which translates to "salt water all the way up." Early English settlers called it the "Sandwich River" and also the "Hawkes River."

The Mi'kmaq people attacked the British blockhouse on the Northwest Arm numerous times during Father Le Loutre's War. In 1751, there were two attacks on blockhouses surrounding Halifax. Mi'kmaq attacked the North Blockhouse (located at the north end of Joseph Howe Drive) and killed the men on guard. They also attacked near the South Blockhouse (located at the south end of Joseph Howe Drive), at a sawmill on a stream flowing out of Chocolate Lake into the Northwest Arm. They killed two men. (Map of Halifax Blockhouses)

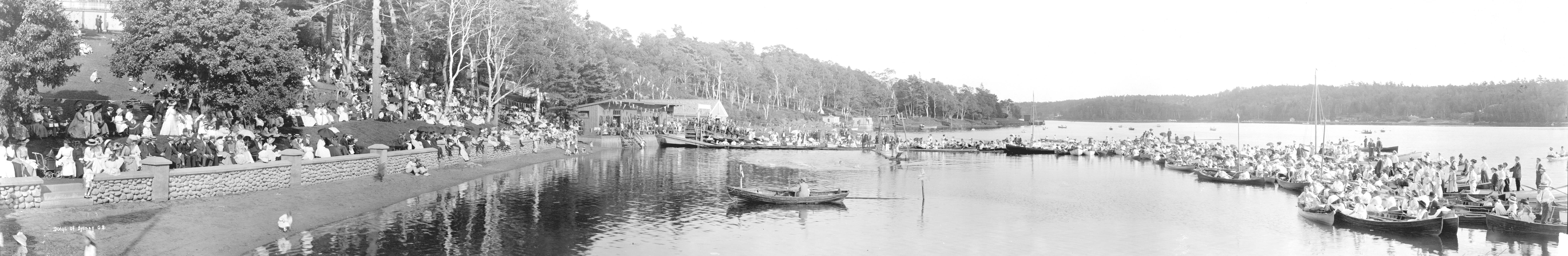
Waegwoltic Club, c. 1910

In 1753, when Lawrence became governor, the Mi'kmaq attacked again upon the sawmills near the South Blockhouse on the Northwest Arm, where they killed three British. The Mi'kmaq made three attempts to retrieve the bodies for their scalps.

It was officially named the North West Arm on 1 March 1921 and it was changed to Northwest Arm on 4 April 1933.

== Shoreline development ==
Much of the shoreline of the Northwest Arm, referred to locally as "the Arm," is fronted by private residences.

The Northwest Arm is the location of several parks. Point Pleasant Park at the southern entrance to the Arm on the Halifax Peninsula. Sir Sandford Fleming Park on the western shoreline contains the Dingle Memorial Tower which, in 1908, commemorated the 150th anniversary of the establishment of responsible government in Nova Scotia, the first colony in the British Empire to do so. Deadman's Island Park commemorates American soldiers who died while imprisoned on the island during the War of 1812. Needs note on Horseshoe Island Park.

The Atlantic School of Theology also maintains its campus along the southern part of the arm.

The Northwest Arm is the location of four marinas:

- Royal Nova Scotia Yacht Squadron
- Armdale Yacht Club
- Waegwoltic Club
