= Sir Sandford Fleming Park =

Park in Halifax, Nova Scotia

Coordinates: 44°37′41.1″N 63°36′7.2″W

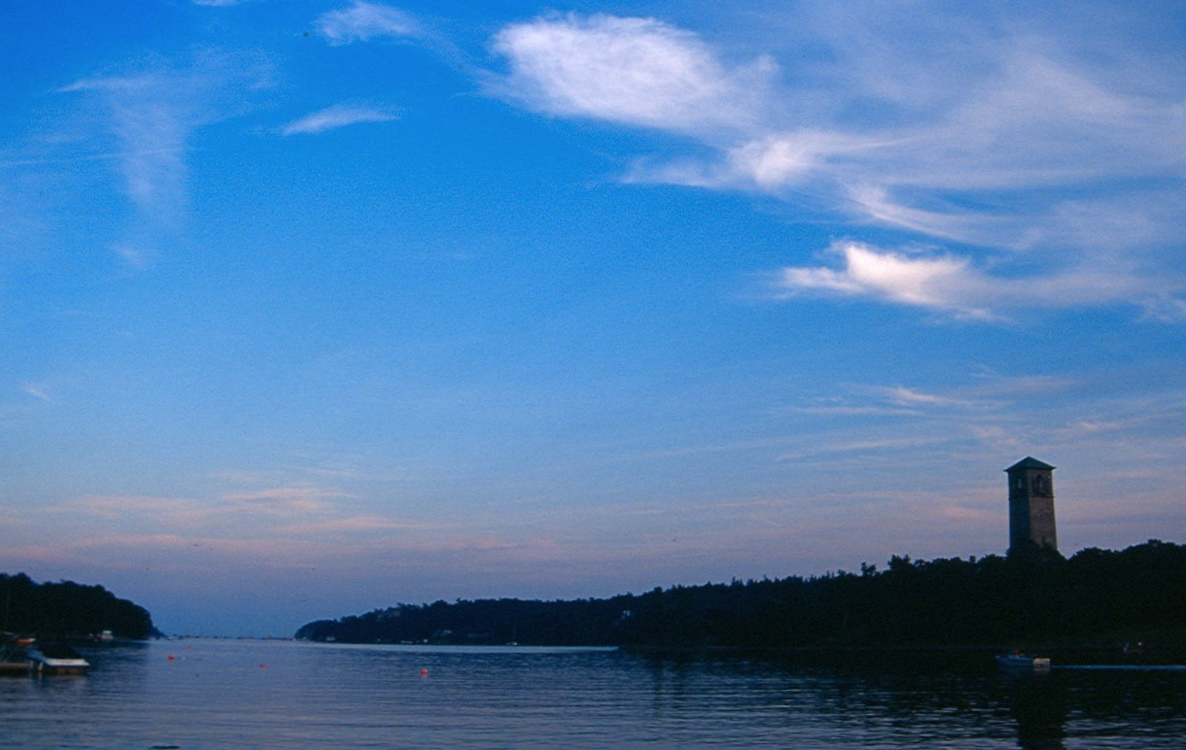
- Dingle Memorial Tower seen over the Northwest Arm
- Interactive map of Sir Sandford Fleming Park
- Type: Public park
- Location: Halifax, Nova Scotia
- Area: 95 acres (38 ha)
- Created: 1908 - 1912
- Operator: City of Halifax

Sir Sandford Fleming Park is a 95-acre (38 ha) Canadian urban park located in the community of Jollimore in Halifax Regional Municipality. It is also known as Dingle Park or simply The Dingle, named after the town of Dingle in southwestern Ireland. The park was donated to the people of Halifax by Sir Sandford Fleming. The centrepiece of the park is an impressive tower that commemorates Nova Scotia's achievement of representative government in 1758. Constructed between 1908 and 1912, the Memorial Tower was erected during the same period of building other commemorative towers in the British Commonwealth, notably Cabot Tower in Bristol, England (1898) and Cabot Tower in St. John's (1900).

== History ==
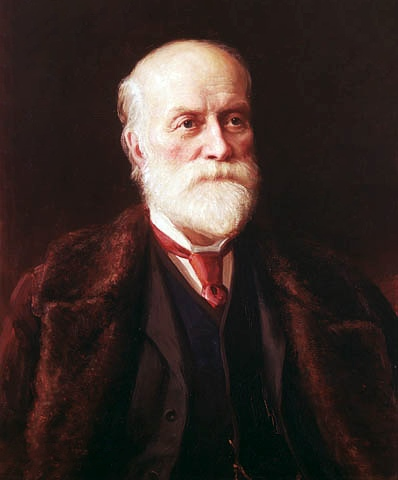
Sir Sandford Fleming: Introduced Standard Time to North America

During the 1880s Sir Sandford Fleming, famous for introducing standard time to North America, established a summer retreat on property fronting Halifax's Northwest Arm, after he finished constructing the Intercolonial Railway. He called his retreat The Dingle, the name that is still used today.

The park contains two walking trails passing through forests, heath barrens, saltwater marsh, and a large pond (Frog Pond). As well, the park also hosts a small sandy beach. The water quality of the beach had been a long, contentious issue due to decades of raw sewage being dumped into the Northwest Arm. Following the completion of new sewage treatment facilities in 2008, many of these concerns were allayed. Swimmers should check the municipality's website, and note that users should not swim at the Dingle beach for three days after heavy rainfall.

=== Dingle Tower ===
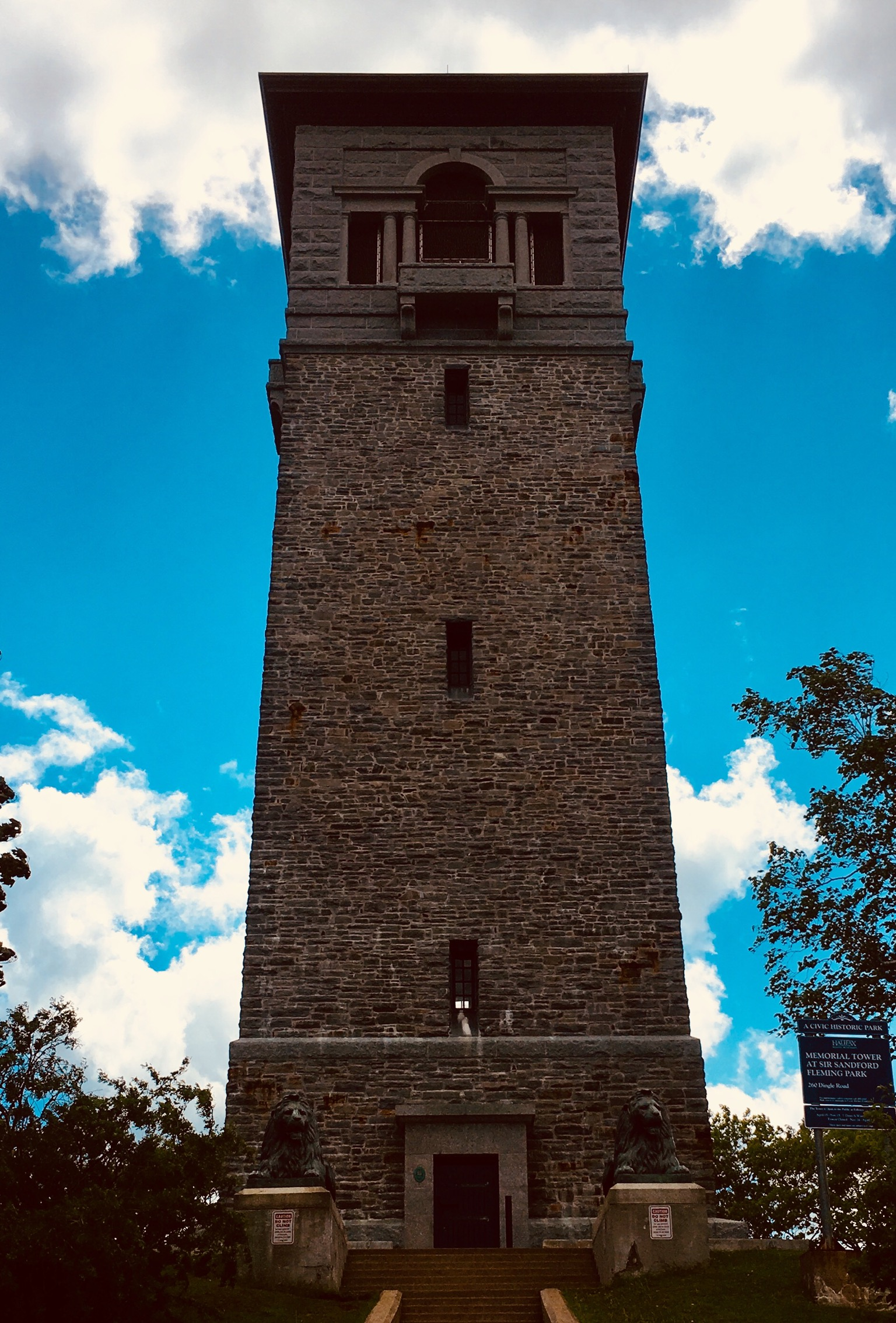
Restored tower, Spring 2018

In 1908, Fleming donated the property to the citizens of Halifax for use as a park and proposed the construction of a tower within it to commemorate the 150th anniversary of the establishment of representative government in Nova Scotia, the province having held on 2 October 1758 the first elected assembly in what is now Canada.

An ardent imperialist, Fleming also intended the proposed tower to serve as a memorial to the development of parliamentary institutions in the British Empire, now the Commonwealth. Designed by the architects Sidney Dumaresq and Andrew R. Cobb, the tower stands out as a rare form of architectural expression in the pre-World War I period of rising Canadian nationalism and fervent loyalty to the British Empire. The Memorial Tower is architecturally important because it combines Italianate influences with local construction methods and materials. The ten-storey stone "Dingle Memorial Tower" plan was accepted by the City of Halifax and the local Canadian Club undertook a fundraising drive to pay for construction. Donations were received from throughout the British Empire and plaques commemorating the contributions, as well as stones from all of the countries of the Empire were placed on the interior walls.

It was formally dedicated in an impressive ceremony in August 1912 by Canada's Governor General the Duke of Connaught who was also Queen Victoria's son Prince Arthur. The presence of members of the Royal Family and dignitaries from other parts of the Empire emphasized the importance of the occasion.

In 1913, two large bronze lions at the foot of the tower were donated by the Royal Colonial Institute of London. Designed by British sculptor Albert Bruce-Joy, they are similar to Sir Edwin Landseer's lions at Nelson's Column in Trafalgar Square.

==== Restoration ====
The Memorial Tower was restored between 2010 and 2013. It was partially reopened at the beginning of August 2012 when the 100th Anniversary was celebrated at the opening ceremony. The bulk of the restoration was done by Coastal Restoration and Masonry with the involvement of a number of other specialist firms. The restoration included repointing the entire tower interior and exterior, rebuilding the copper roof, installing new stainless steel grilles on the Observation Deck to keep birds out and people in, reinforcing and refinishing the internal stairs, installing new interior and exterior lighting, refurbishing the window openings and installing new windows, and refurbishing the 35 plaques on the interior walls and the two bronze lions guarding the entrance. The total cost was approximately $2.3 million. The Dingle Memorial Tower is open to the public in the summer months and has views of the city and Northwest Arm.

==== Dingle Tower Gallery ====
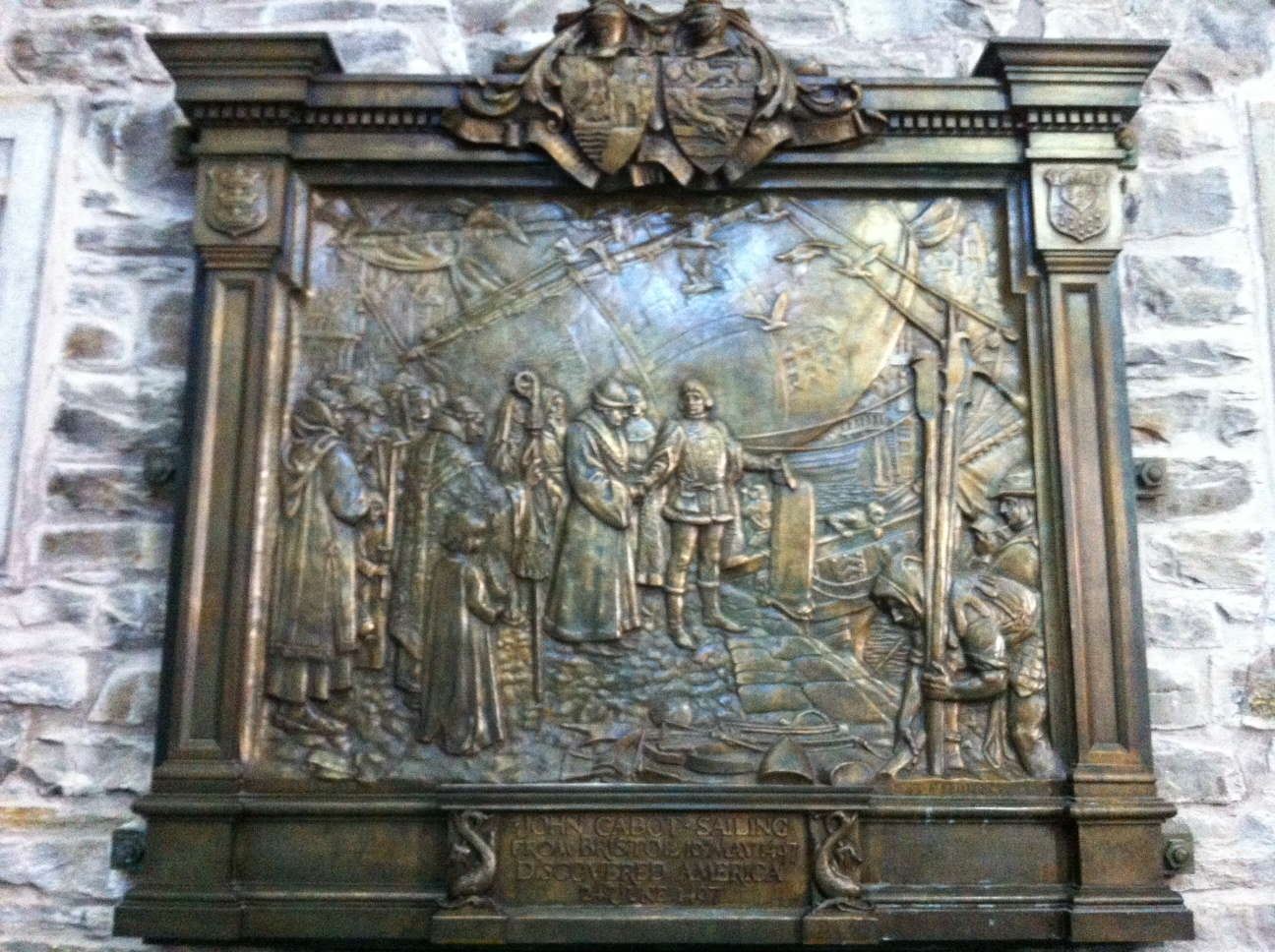
John Cabot departing Bristol, England for Atlantic Canada (1497)

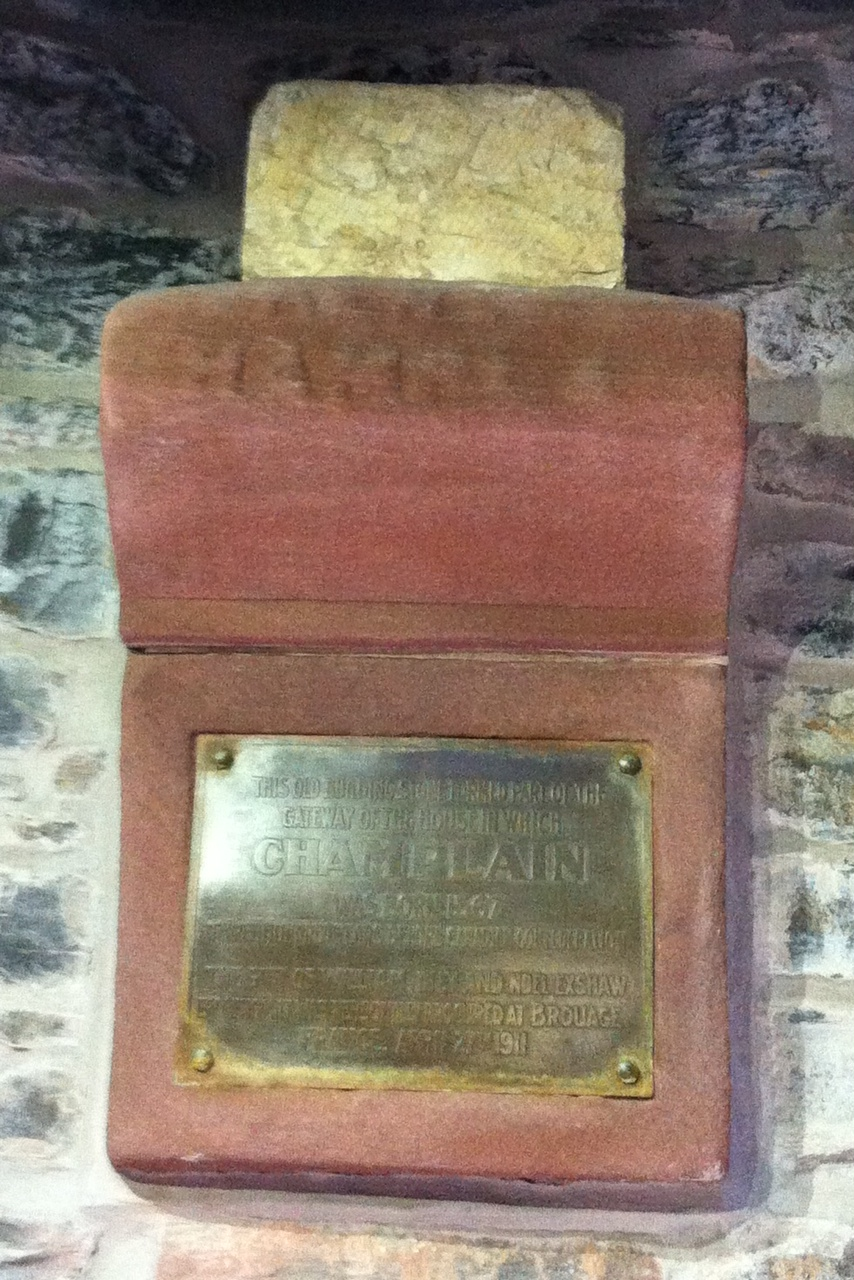
Stone from Samuel de Champlain's birthplace in Brouage, France (1574)

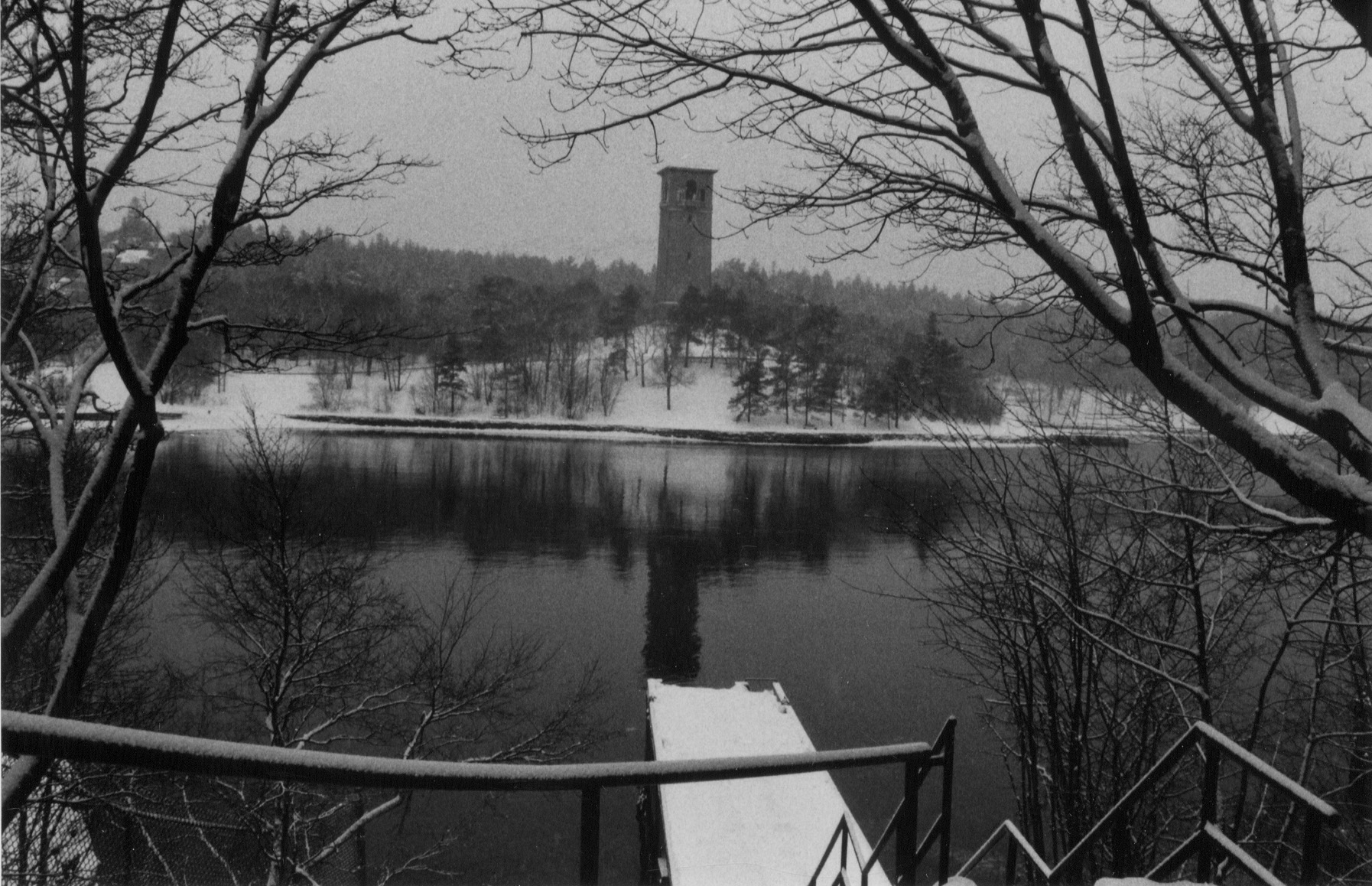
Dingle Memorial Tower

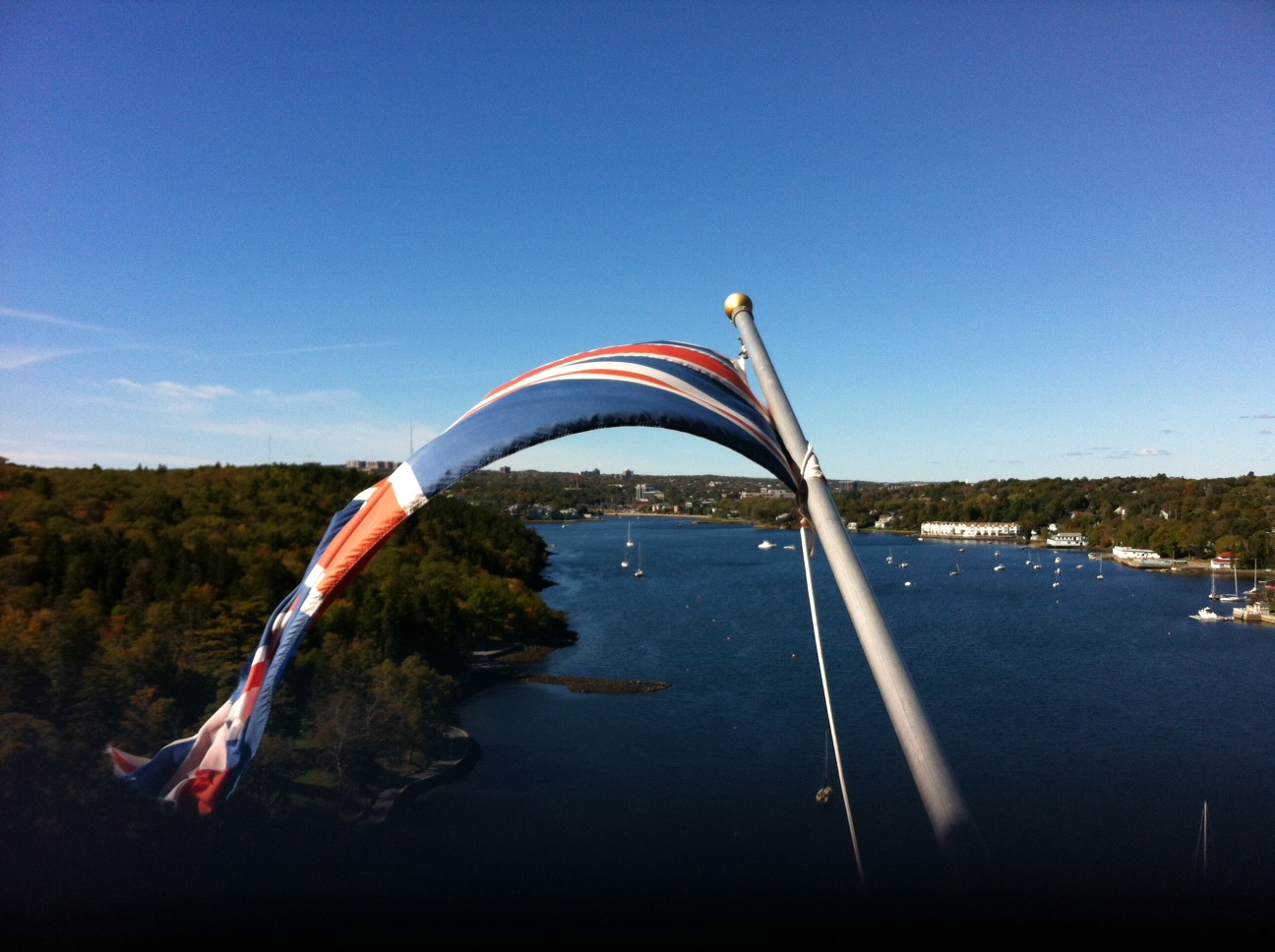
View From Dingle Tower

=== Sir Sandford Fleming Cottage ===
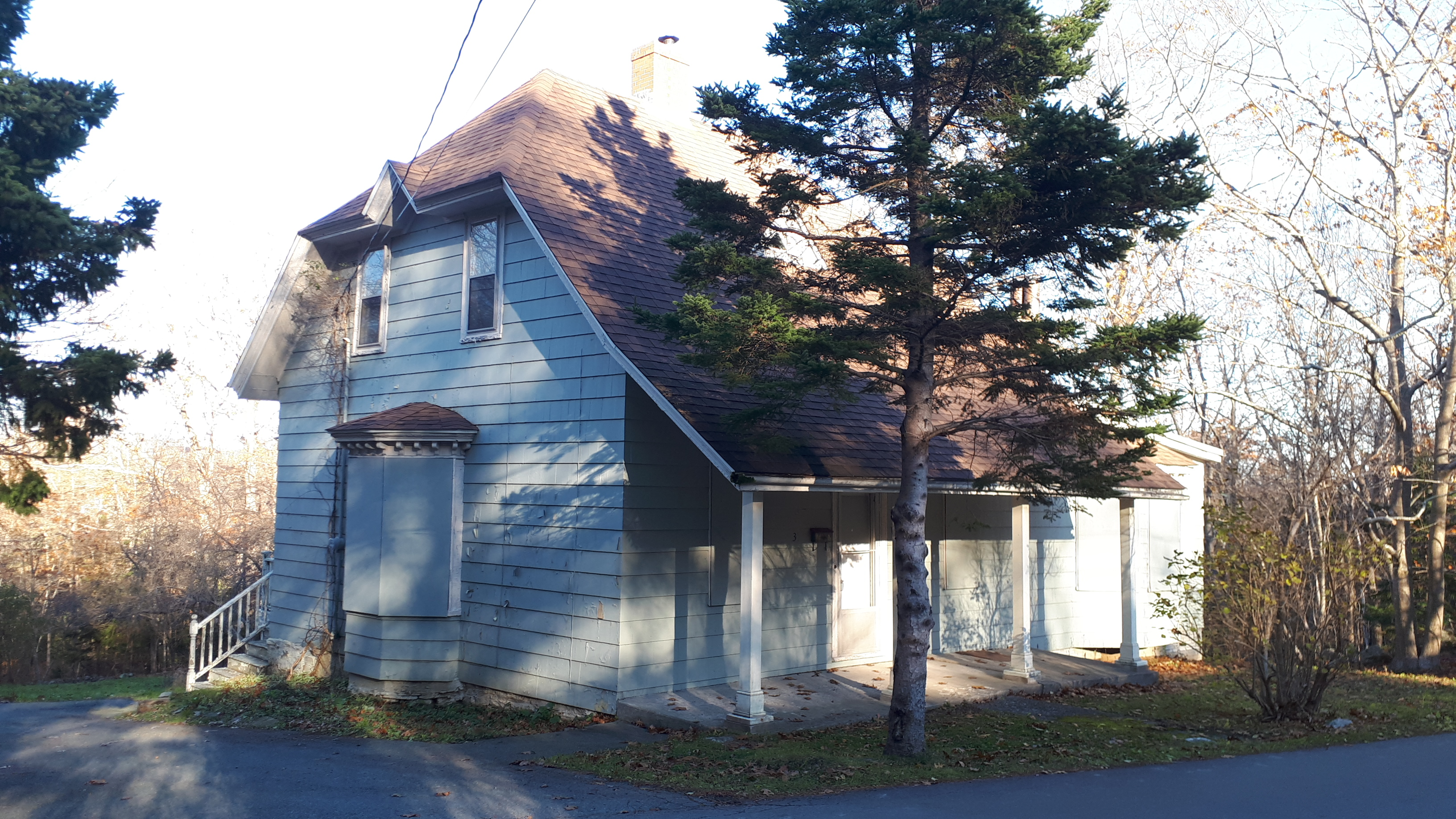
Fleming Cottage, the summer residence of Sandford Flemming in the Park.

This rustic cottage on Dingle Road in the park was built in 1886 on land purchased in 1871 by Sandford Fleming. He spent summers at the cottage until his death in the cottage in 1915. The cottage was noted for its large stone fireplace studded with Nova Scotia amethyst The cottage was purchased by the city in 1948 and designated a municipal heritage building in 1985. It was used for rental accommodation as well as by park maintenance workers until the 1990s. Concerns have been raised about its fate as it currently remains vacant and boarded up, although the Halifax Regional Municipality is studying restoration and adaptive reuse.

== See also ==
- List of historic places in Halifax, Nova Scotia
