= Armdale Yacht Club =

Yacht club in Halifax, Nova Scotia

Coordinates: 44°38′6.5″N 63°36′50.9″W

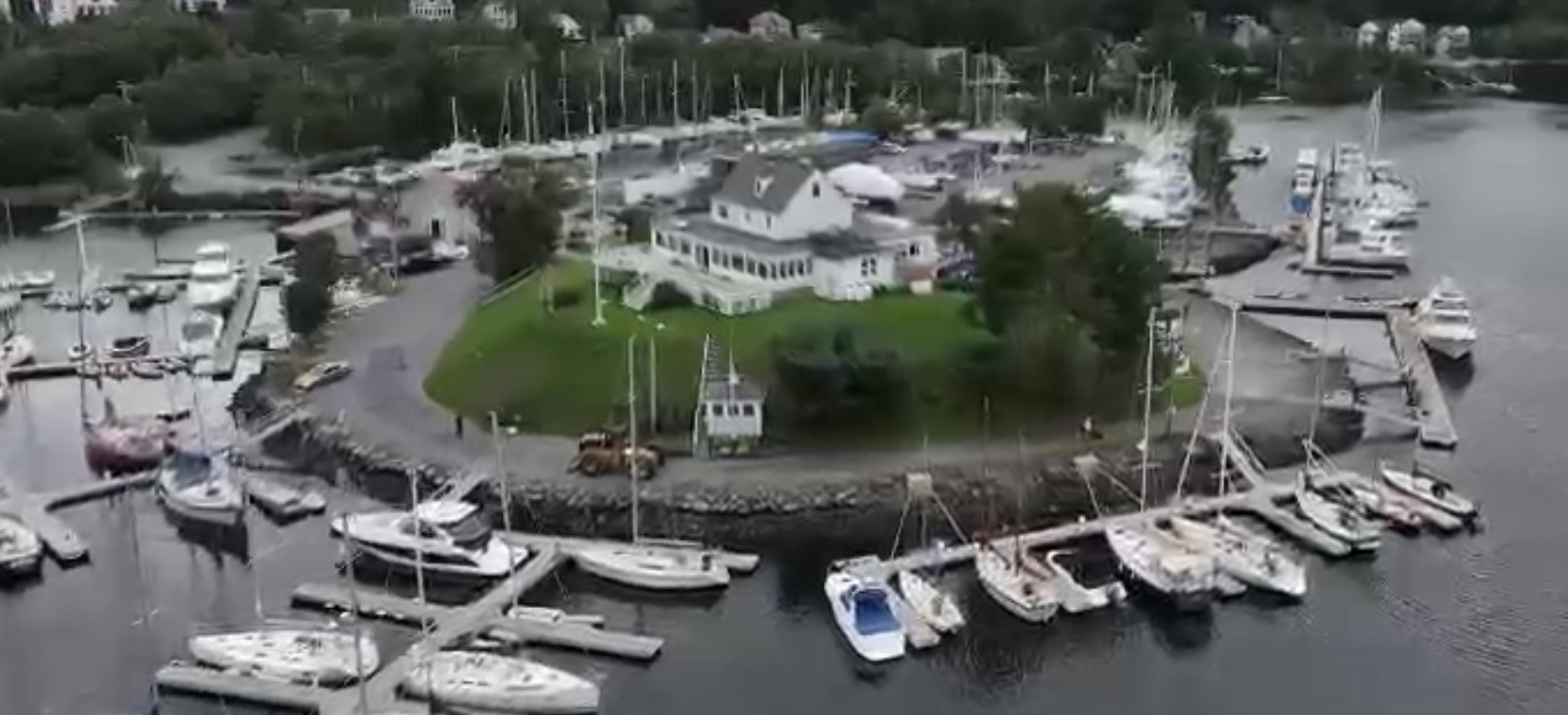
- Armdale Yacht Club
- Abbreviation: AYC
- Formation: 1937
- Legal status: active
- Purpose: advocate and public voice, educator and network for recreational and competitive sailors, coaches, volunteers and events
- Location: 75 Burgee Run, Halifax, Nova Scotia, Canada
- Affiliations: Britannia Yacht Club
- Website: armdaleyachtclub.ns.ca

The Armdale Yacht Club is a yacht club located on Melville Island, at the head of Halifax Harbour's Northwest Arm in Nova Scotia, Canada. The Club was founded in 1937 and was established at its current location in 1947. The Club is known for founding the Bluenose fleet.

== Melville Island ==
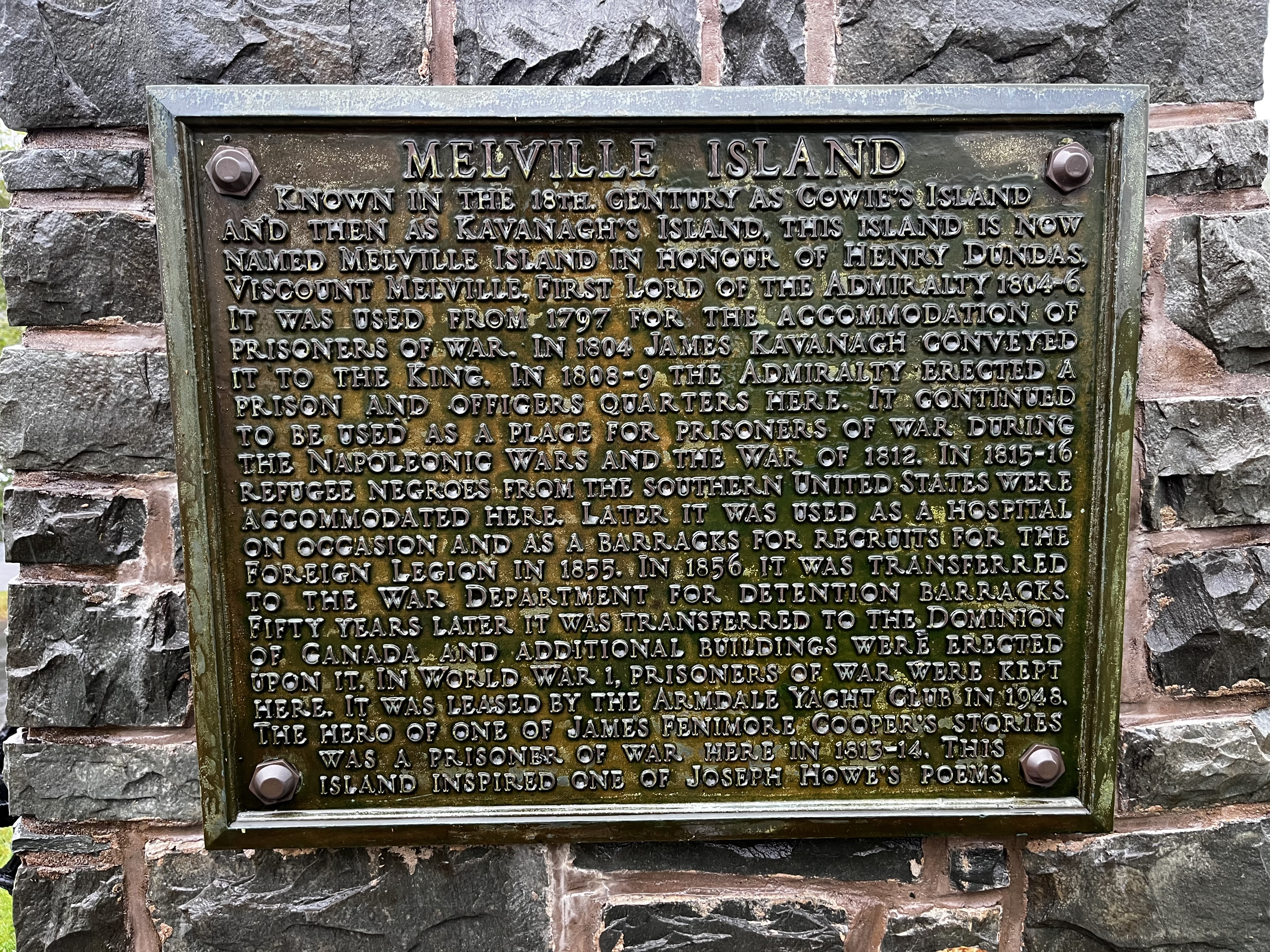
Melville Island Plaque, Armdale Yacht Club, Halifax, Nova Scotia

The land was officially named Melville Island in late 1804 or early 1805 in honour of prominent abolitionist Henry Dundas, Viscount Melville (who at the time had just been appointed First Lord of the Admiralty).

Sir Admiral John Borlase Warren and Captain John MacKellar erected the officers’ quarters, the current Club House, in 1808 when he was commander-in-chief on the North American Station from 1807 to 1810.

Beginning in 1808, during the Napoleonic Wars prisoners were kept on site. The War of 1812 brought an influx of American prisoners to Melville Island; up to 1800 at a time were housed in its barracks or on a nearby 350-person prison ship Magnet. Most of the French prisoners were released or paroled to make room for the Americans, who were seen as more of a risk. The most famous prisoners were the 320 American survivors of the capture of USS Chesapeake in 1813 who were interned on Melville Island.

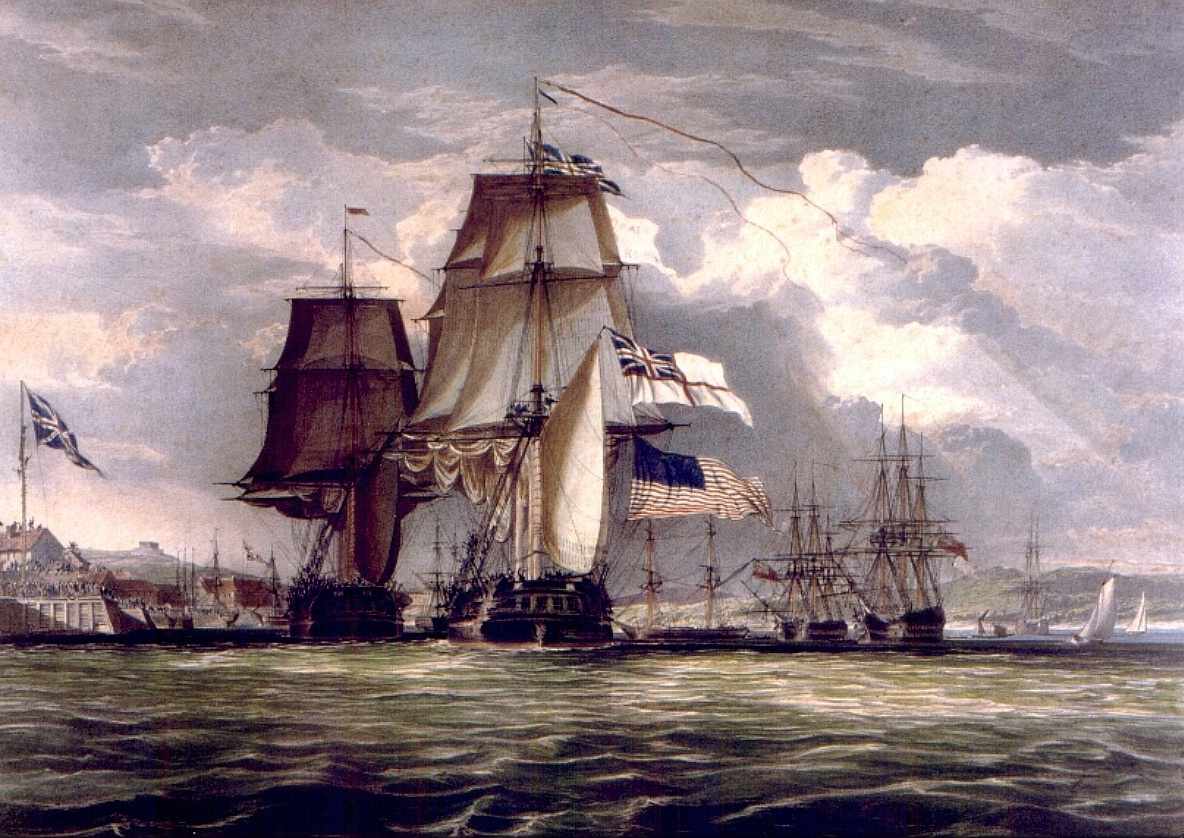
The 320 Americans from the frigate Chesapeake were imprisoned at Melville Island (1813). Image of HMS Shannon leading the capture of USS Chesapeake

After the decommissioning of the military prison, Melville Island was used as a receiving depot for 727 of the black refugees, the estimated 1600–2000 escaped slaves who arrived in Halifax between 1815 and 1818.

The Irish Famine led 1,200 Irish to flee to Halifax from May to October 1847. They quarantined at Melville Island, where 203 Irish patients were admitted to hospital and 30 died.

In 1855, Nova Scotia politician Joseph Howe developed a plan to use Melville Island as a recruitment and training centre for American soldiers to fight for the British Foreign Legion in the Crimean War. Written when he was age 17, Howe's first poem was entitled Melville Island (1821).

Author of the Last of the Mohicans, James Fenimore Cooper, briefly used Melville Island as the setting for his book Ned Myers: Life Before the Mast (1843).

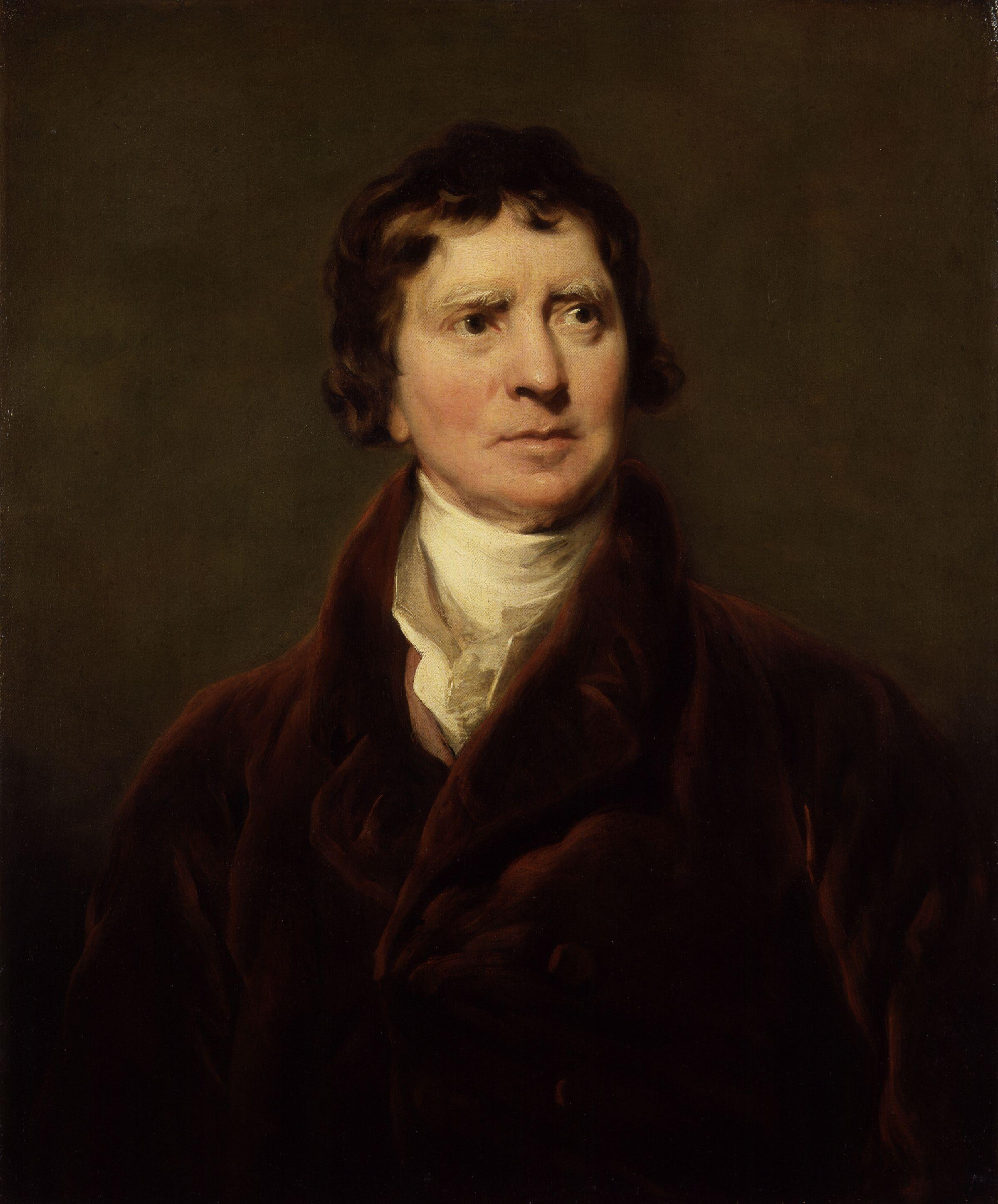
Melville Island namesake, abolitionist Henry Dundas, 1st Viscount Melville (1804)

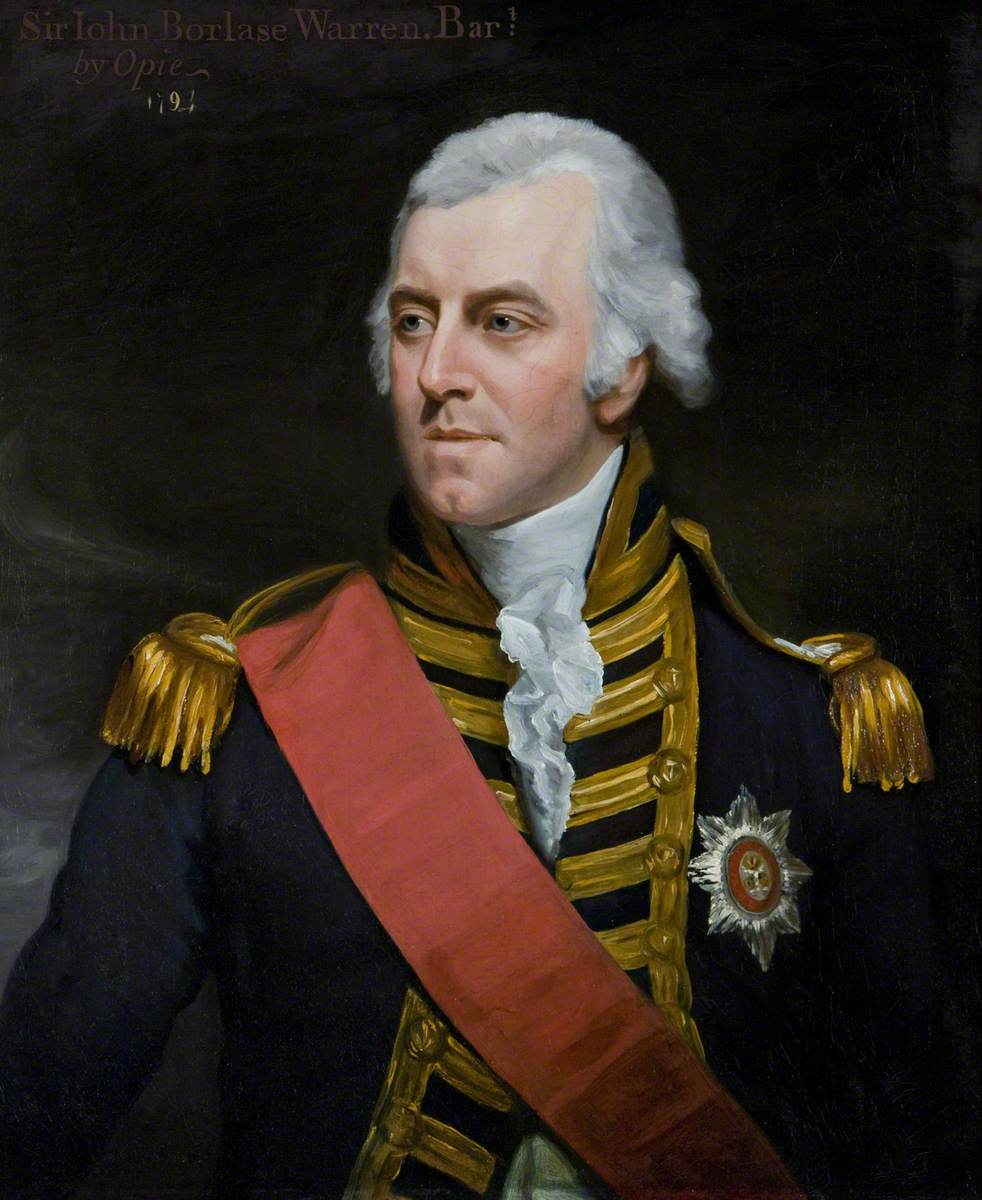
Builder of Club House Sir Admiral John Borlase Warren (1808)

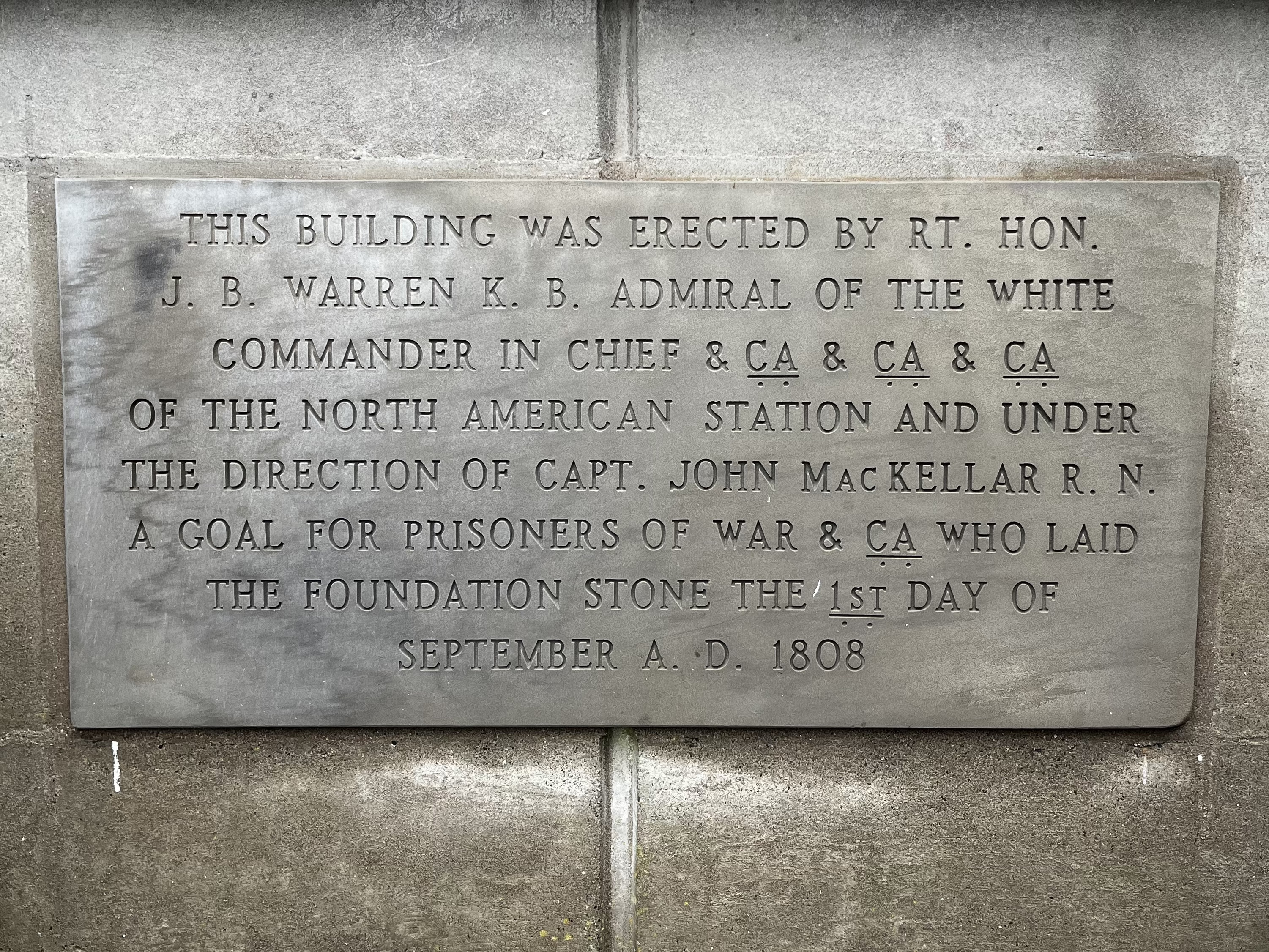
Plaque to Club House builder John Borlase Warren (1808) and Captain John MacKellar, mounted on Club House

Club House on Hill (1855)

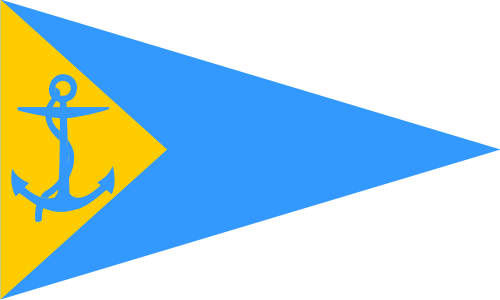
Burgee of Armdale Yacht Club

== Partnerships ==
The AYC has reciprocal agreements with other yacht clubs, e.g. Britannia Yacht Club

== Notable members ==
- William James Roué, Marine Architect of the Bluenose
- Ronald Wallace (politician), Mayor of Halifax, Nova Scotia
