= The Republic of Nothing =

1994 novel by Lesley Choyce

- Third edition cover
- Author: Lesley Choyce
- Language: English
- Genre: Fiction
- Published: 1994
- Publisher: Goose Lane Editions
- Publication place: Canada
- Media type: Print (Paperback)
- Pages: 364 (Note: The 1994 first edition of the novel has 364 pages, while the 2007 Reader's Guide Edition has 382 pages with the inclusion of the afterword by Neil Peart and other material.)
- ISBN: 978-0-8649-2493-3
- OCLC: 78042666
- Dewey Decimal: 813/.54
- LC Class: PR9199.3.C497 R47 1994

The Republic of Nothing is a novel by Lesley Choyce, published in 1994 by Goose Lane Editions. Set on the fictional Whalebone Island off the coast of Nova Scotia, the novel follows the coming-of-age story of Ian McQuade and his experiences with his eccentric family and island residents over the course of roughly 30 years. The novel's themes surrounding environmentalism and the Vietnam War are informed by Choyce's own experiences growing up in the 1950s and 1960s, participating in protests against the war.

Characterized as a combination of magic realism, parody, and bildungsroman, the novel is regarded as one of Choyce's most well-received works, and was praised by critics for its engaging plot and poetic style of prose. A Reader's Guide Edition of the book was published in 2007 in celebration of its 10 year anniversary, with the addition of an afterword by Neil Peart, drummer and lyricist for Rush. While the book has received little academic attention, it has been included in the high school curriculum in Nova Scotia and Alberta. The novel was the winner of the Dartmouth Book Award for Fiction at the Atlantic Book Awards in 1995.

== Plot ==
The Republic of Nothing follows the coming-of-age story of Ian McQuade, a teenager living on the fictional Whalebone Island off the coast of Nova Scotia. The novel takes place over the course of roughly 30 years, written from the perspective of Ian, and chronicles the island's self-declared independence as the "Republic of Nothing".

The story begins on 21 March 1951, when Everett McQuade, Ian's idealistic father, declares Whalebone Island independent from Canada. After an unsuccessful attempt at blowing up the bridge connecting the island to the mainland, Everett writes a declaration of independence on a typewriter that washed ashore, naming the country "The Republic of Nothing" to signify his anarchist rejection of existing doctrines and governance. Ian, born on the same day, grows up in the eccentric community of the island and is shaped by his father's vision. His early years are marked by peculiar incidents such as an elephant corpse washing ashore and the discovery of a Viking skeleton in the bogs of the island.

Ian's mother, Dorothy, is a nurturing but pragmatic figure with psychic abilities. Found by Everett on the shore at the age of 15 with no memory of her past, she is taken in by Mrs. Bernie Todd, a capable island resident. Ian's younger sister, Casey, was born during a hurricane and exhibits similar spiritual qualities to their mother. The small population of the island also includes Hants Buckler, the old man of the island who scavenges for goods washed ashore; and Tennessee Ernie Phillips, an American physicist who had helped develop the hydrogen bomb and escaped to the island with his wife and daughter Gwendolyn after being driven out of New Mexico.

Life on the island begins to change when Everett is elected as the MLA for Sheet Harbour, and his political ambitions pull him away from the island to Halifax for long periods of time. During his absences, Dorothy remains faithful but forms a psychic bond with the neighbour Ben Ackerman, an American from New York, which creates emotional tension for the family. Ian, navigating the difficulties of adolescence, struggles to find his identity amid feelings of insecurity, particularly as he develops a fleeting romance with Gwendolyn. Everett's political career culminates in his election as Premier of Nova Scotia, but he is nearly killed on-stage in an assassination attempt by a rival candidate after the results are announced. Dorothy, Ian, and Casey rush to the hospital, and Everett is saved when Dorothy takes 25 Valium pills, approaching death herself to use her abilities to keep him alive.

Whalebone Island faces a significant challenge when a mining conglomerate discovers uranium on the Crown land comprising the interior of the island, threatening to destroy its ecosystem and the islanders' way of life with mining operations. Ian sabotages the company's mining equipment, but the company returns with more equipment and the RCMP, who warn Everett and Ian away from the mining operations. With his new political aptitude, Everett decides to visit the United Nations in New York to follow up on his declaration of independence, with the goal of creating enough legal difficulties for the mining company that they abandon their plans. Ian and Everett travel meet with a UN official, who is moved but tells the pair that he cannot help. Ian, remembering the finger he had taken from the Viking skeleton as a good luck charm, presents it to the official and explains that if mining operations were to take place it would be disturbing the remains. Whalebone Island is declared a World Preservation Site, permanently halting the uranium extraction.

== Background ==
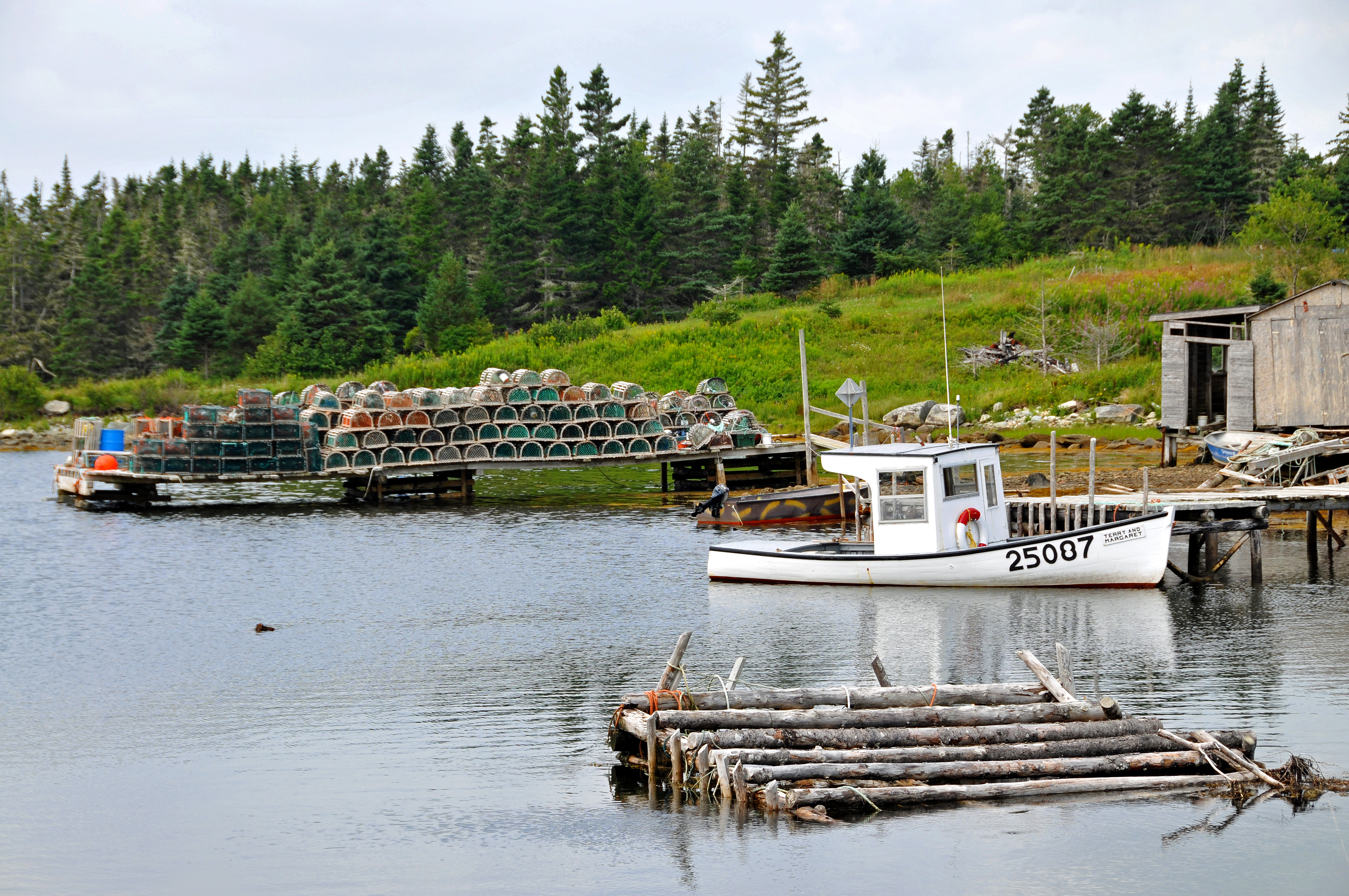
The fictional Whalebone Island was determined to be in roughly the location of Sober Island

Born on 21 March 1951 in New Jersey, Lesley Choyce moved to Lawrencetown Beach, Nova Scotia in 1978. The Republic of Nothing's themes of environmentalism and the Vietnam War are inspired by his own experiences growing up in the 1950s and 1960s in the United States, where after graduating from high school in 1969 he became involved in the protests against the war. Choyce marched in demonstrations in New York and Washington, D.C., and participated in a protest at Fort Bragg led by Jane Fonda.

The fictional island described in the novel is stated to be a specific distance from Halifax. Using this information, a reader determined that the island in the novel is roughly in the location of Sober Island.

== Style and themes ==
The Republic of Nothing is characterized as a combination of magic realism, parody, and bildungsroman, with a narrative that challenges traditional portrayals of regional and national identity. Described as a "tribute to Nova Scotia", the coming-of-age novel rejects the essentialist, polarized depictions of the province typically invoked by Maritime fiction, using parody to undermine images of Nova Scotian cultural identity. The novel explores political themes such as environmentalism and the Vietnam War, critiquing American patriotism and offering a feminist portrayal of controversial issues including abortion and domestic violence.

== Reception ==
The Republic of Nothing is regarded as one of Choyce's most well-received novels, and has been described as a "contemporary classic in Canadian literature". At the time of its release, it was praised for its engaging and volatile plot, and Choyce's poetic style of prose. A review in the Montreal Gazette stated that the novel "should be granted its appropriate label as the Canadian version of Midnight's Children", while the British Columbian writer Jim Christy described it as "an unpredictable universe", stating that its unpredictability "makes the novel a success". A review in The Ottawa Citizen was more critical of the novel, referring to it as being "afflicted" with "false portentousness". The review opined that the novel shows promise at the beginning, but the plot begins to erode partway through the story. The review also criticized the novel for its heavy use of American themes.

The Canadian literary scholar David Creelman argues that the book was prevented from receiving a wider audience due to the limited marketing budget of its independent publisher and its "innovative form and style". He argues that realism is the dominant literary form in the Maritime provinces, and The Republic of Nothing may have been hindered by falling outside this mainstream. Creelman notes that despite the novel receiving little academic attention, it was used in the high school curriculum for Nova Scotia and Alberta, speaking to its accessibility. Use of the book in schools accounts for its nonprofessional reviews on Amazon.com, with one stating that "unlike most school books which are often boring and tedious, this one kept us interested".

The novel was the winner of the Dartmouth Book Award for Fiction at the Atlantic Book Awards in 1995.

== Publication history ==
The Republic of Nothing was first published in 1994 by Goose Lane Editions of Fredericton, New Brunswick. The editor of Goose Lane at the time, Laurel Boone, stated that the book was provided a "decent tour". The novel was produced and marketed with financial support from the Canada Council for the Arts, the Canadian federal government's Book Publishing Industry Support Program, and the New Brunswick Department of Economic Development, Tourism, and Culture.

The third edition of The Republic of Nothing, the Reader's Guide Edition, was published in 2007 in celebration of the novel's 10 year anniversary. The new edition was augmented with the addition of an afterword by Neil Peart, the drummer and lyricist of the Canadian rock band Rush. Peart was impressed with the book to the degree that he wrote a letter to Choyce in 1996, beginning a 10-year correspondence with him. It was Peart's correspondence with Choyce that led Peart to write his own book The Masked Rider, which Choyce published through Pottersfield Press. Also included in the Reader's Guide Edition is an interview with Choyce, and a study guide pertaining to the book to be used by students. The republication of the book was advertised with launch parties in Halifax and at the Frye Festival in Moncton, New Brunswick.

== Film ==
The Republic of Nothing was optioned for film, with the screenplay developed by Jeff Mueller, who also owns the screen rights. The film has not been produced.

== See also ==
- Lesley Choyce bibliography
- Literature of Nova Scotia
- Uranium mining in Nova Scotia
