= Lesley Choyce bibliography =

Lesley Choyce (born 21 March 1951) is a Canadian writer and publisher from Nova Scotia who has written an extensive body of literature. Choyce founded the publisher Pottersfield Press in 1979, which publishes books of regional interest for Atlantic Canada. This bibliography lists his autobiographical works, anthologies, children's and young adult literature, fiction and non-fiction, poetry, and musical works.

== Autobiographical ==
List of autobiographical works by Lesley Choyce
Year	Title	Publisher	Identifiers	Notes
1987	An Avalanche of Ocean	Goose Lane Editions	ISBN 978-0-8649-2069-0 OCLC 16713080	
1993	Transcendental Anarchy: Confessions of a Metaphysical Tourist	Quarry Press	ISBN 978-1-5508-2073-7 OCLC 29255151	
2006	Driving Minnie's Piano: Memoirs of a Surfing Life in Nova Scotia	Pottersfield Press	ISBN 978-1-8959-0085-9 OCLC 70266659	
2009	Seven Ravens: Two Summers in a Life by the Sea	Wolsak and Wynn	ISBN 978-1-8949-8739-4 OCLC 428868517	
2020	Saltwater Chronicles: Notes on Everything Under the Nova Scotia Sun	Nimbus Publishing	ISBN 978-1-7710-8826-8 OCLC 1134391898	

== Anthologies ==
List of anthologies edited by Lesley Choyce
Year	Title	Publisher	Identifiers	Notes
1971-1985	The Pottersfield Portfolio, Volumes 1-7	Pottersfield Press	OCLC 1264909793	
1977	Alternating Current: Renewable Energy for Atlantic Canada	Wooden Anchor Press	ISBN 978-0-9205-6002-0 OCLC 5887439	
1977	Chezzetcook	Wooden Anchor Press	ISBN 978-0-9205-6001-3 OCLC 15852940	
1980	ACCESS: Atlantic Canada Community Energy Strategy Sourcebook	Pottersfield Press	ISBN 978-0-9190-0101-5 OCLC 228895054	
1981	Visions from the Edge: An Anthology of Atlantic Canadian Science Fiction and Fantasy	Pottersfield Press	ISBN 978-0-9190-0104-6 OCLC 10213901	
1984, 1989	The Cape Breton Collection	Pottersfield Press	ISBN 978-0-9190-0115-2 OCLC 11102803	
1992	Ark of Ice: Canadian Futurefiction	Pottersfield Press	ISBN 978-0-9190-0173-2 OCLC 28024846	
1997	The Mi'kmaq Anthology	Pottersfield Press	ISBN 978-1-8959-0004-0 OCLC 36695018	
2001	Atlantica: Stories from the Maritimes and Newfoundland	Goose Lane Editions	ISBN 978-0-8649-2309-7	
2004	Pottersfield Nation: East of Canada	Pottersfield Press	ISBN 978-1-8959-0063-7 OCLC 55510877	
2005	Nova Scotia: A Traveller's Companion: Over 300 Years of Travel Writing	Pottersfield Press	ISBN 978-1-8959-0072-9 OCLC 60369549	
2009	Nova Scotia: Visions of the Future	Pottersfield Press	ISBN 978-1-8974-2607-4 OCLC 300582784	
2011	The Mi'kmaq Anthology, Volume 2: In Celebration of The Life of Rita Joe	Pottersfield Press	ISBN 978-1-8974-2629-6 OCLC 726556292	
2016	Nova Scotia Love Stories	Pottersfield Press	ISBN 978-1-8974-2680-7 OCLC 930042084	
2017	The Nova Scotia Book of Fathers	Pottersfield Press	ISBN 978-1-9882-8608-2 OCLC 994869088	
2021	Down Home for Christmas: Holiday Stories From Atlantic Canada	Pottersfield Press	ISBN 978-1-9897-2569-6 OCLC 1256821573	
2023	State of the Ark: Canadian Futurefiction	Pottersfield Press	ISBN 978-1-9907-7033-3 OCLC 1381680875	
2023	High Water Mark: Atlantic Canadian Stories 1983–2023	Pottersfield Press	ISBN 978-1-9907-7021-0 OCLC 1350540421	

== Non-fiction ==
List of non-fiction works by Lesley Choyce
Year	Title	Publisher	Identifiers	Notes
1977	Edible Wild Plants of the Maritimes	Wooden Anchor Press	ISBN 978-0-9205-6000-6 OCLC 15853094	
1988	December Six/The Halifax Solution: An Alternative to Nuclear War	Pottersfield Press	ISBN 978-0-9190-0145-9 OCLC 16581330	
1997	Nova Scotia: Shaped by the Sea: A Living History	Pottersfield Press	ISBN 978-0-6163-7536-5 OCLC 1011704642	
2000	Your Guide to Getting Published	Coles Publishing	ISBN 978-0-7740-0615-6 OCLC 44751663	
2002	The Coasts of Canada: A History	Goose Lane Editions	ISBN 978-0-8649-2360-8 OCLC 50185968	
2007	Nova Scotia: Shaped By the Sea, Revised Edition	Pottersfield Press	ISBN 978-1-8959-0094-1 OCLC 163697522	
2008	Peggy's Cove: the Amazing History of a Coastal Village	Pottersfield Press	ISBN 978-1-9897-2552-8 OCLC 1232108444	
2011	How to Fix Your Head	Wolsak and Wynn	ISBN 978-1-8949-8754-7 OCLC 701589969	
2020	Nova Scotia: Shaped By the Sea, Revised 4th Edition	Pottersfield Press	ISBN 978-1-9897-2515-3 OCLC 1159000655	
2022	Around England with a Dog	Rocky Mountain Books	ISBN 978-1-7716-0452-9 OCLC 1340957227	

== Fiction ==
List of novels by Lesley Choyce
Year	Title	Publisher	Identifiers	Notes
1980	Eastern Sure	Nimbus Publishing	ISBN 978-0-9208-5208-8 OCLC 9198150	
1984	Downwind	Creative Publishers	ISBN 978-0-9200-2108-8 OCLC 12694307	
1984	Billy Botzweiler's Last Dance and Other Stories	Blewointment Press	ISBN 9780889710993 OCLC 12215791	
1985	Conventional Emotions	Creative Publishers	ISBN 978-0-9200-2127-9 OCLC 16064324	
1986	The Dream Auditor: Short Stories	Ragweed Press	ISBN 978-0-9203-0463-1 OCLC 16042964	
1988	Coming Up for Air	Creative Publishers	ISBN 978-0-9200-2155-2 OCLC 18644871	
1989	The Second Season of Jonas MacPherson	Thistledown Press	ISBN 978-0-9206-3367-0 OCLC 19848090	
1991	Magnificent Obsessions: A Photonovel	Quarry Press	ISBN 978-1-5508-2020-1 OCLC 24375016	
1992	The Ecstasy Conspiracy	NuAge Editions	ISBN 978-0-9218-3319-2 OCLC 27068372	
1994	The Republic of Nothing	Goose Lane Editions	ISBN 978-0-8649-2493-3 OCLC 78042666	
1996	Trap Door To Heaven: New Fiction	Quarry Press	ISBN 978-1-5508-2157-4 OCLC 35884855	
1997	Dance the Rocks Ashore: Stories New and Selected	Goose Lane Editions	ISBN 978-0-8649-2218-2 OCLC 36695197	
1998	World Enough: A Novel	Goose Lane Editions	ISBN 978-0-8649-2246-5 OCLC 39714556	
1999	The Summer of Apartment X	Goose Lane Editions	ISBN 978-0-8649-2270-0 OCLC 41224512	
2002	Cold Clear Morning	Porcepic Books	ISBN 978-0-6162-0703-1 OCLC 645763619	
2002	Shoulder the Sky	Dundurn Press	ISBN 978-1-5500-2415-9 OCLC 49795729	
2003	Sea of Tranquility	Simon & Pierre	ISBN 978-1-5500-2440-1 OCLC 51496260	
2007	The End of the World as We Know It	Red Deer Press	ISBN 978-0-8899-5379-6 OCLC 85832909	
2008	The Book of Michael: A Novel	Red Deer Press	ISBN 978-0-8899-5417-5 OCLC 185023102	
2010	Reaction	Orca Book Publishers	ISBN 978-1-5546-9278-1 OCLC 468103037	
2010	Raising Orion	Thistledown Press	ISBN 978-1-8972-3580-5 OCLC 658581641	
2011	Cold Clear Morning, Revised Edition	Pottersfield Press	ISBN 978-1-8974-2632-6 OCLC 718183124	
2017	The Unlikely Redemption of John Alexander MacNeil	Fernwood Publishing	ISBN 978-1-5526-6920-4 OCLC 968345138	
2019	Broken Man on a Halifax Pier	Dundurn Press	ISBN 978-1-4597-4524-7 OCLC 1083615370	
2023	The Untimely Resurrection of John Alexander MacNeil: A Novel	Fernwood Publishing	ISBN 978-1-7736-3639-9 OCLC 1379426797	
2026	No More Fridays	Fernwood Publishing	ISBN 978-1-7736-3804-1 OCLC 1548740425	

== Children's literature ==
List of children's books by Lesley Choyce
Year	Title	Publisher	Identifiers	Notes
1990	The Hungry Lizards	Collier Macmillan	ISBN 978-0-0295-3936-1 OCLC 21047461	
1997	Go For it Carrie	Formac Publishing Company	ISBN 978-0-8878-0392-5 OCLC 36044416	
1998	Carrie's Crowd	Formac Publishing Company	ISBN 978-0-8878-0464-9 OCLC 39913883	
1998	Famous at Last	Pottersfield Press	ISBN 978-1-8959-0011-8 OCLC 38748806	
2000	Far Enough Island	Pottersfield Press	ISBN 978-1-8959-0033-0 OCLC 44264978	
2001	Carrie's Camping Adventure	Formac Publishing Company	ISBN 978-0-8878-0534-9 OCLC 46623402	
2003	Carrie Loses Her Nerve	Formac Publishing Company	ISBN 978-0-8878-0592-9 OCLC 51631304	
2006	Skunks for Breakfast	Nimbus Publishing	ISBN 978-1-5510-9586-8 OCLC 70676122	
2019	Sid the Kid and the Dryer: A Story About Sidney Crosby	Nimbus Publishing	ISBN 978-1-7710-8775-9 OCLC 1111801562	

== Young adult literature ==
List of young adult novels by Lesley Choyce
Year	Title	Publisher	Identifiers	Notes
1989	Skateboard Shakedown	Formac Publishing Company	ISBN 978-0-8878-0074-0 OCLC 20531329	
1990	Wave Watch	Formac Publishing Company	ISBN 978-0-8878-0080-1 OCLC 22387699	
1991	Wrong Time, Wrong Place	Formac Publishing Company	ISBN 978-0-8878-0098-6 OCLC 24911865	
1991	Some Kind of Hero	Maxwell-Macmillan	ISBN 978-0-0295-4082-4 OCLC 24214591	
1992	Margin of Error: A Young Adult Short Story Collection	Borealis Press	ISBN 978-0-8888-7126-8 OCLC 25548231	
1992	Clearcut Danger	Formac Publishing Company	ISBN 978-0-8878-0213-3 OCLC 27222897	
1993	Full Tilt	Maxwell-Macmillan	ISBN 978-0-0295-4170-8 OCLC 28017647	
1993	Good Idea Gone Bad	Formac Publishing Company	ISBN 978-0-8878-0239-3 OCLC 35228956	
1994	Dark End of Dream Street	Formac Publishing Company	ISBN 978-0-8878-0296-6 OCLC 31651339	
1995	Big Burn	Thistledown Press	ISBN 978-1-8954-4943-3 OCLC 37903397	
1996	Falling Through the Cracks	Formac Publishing Company	ISBN 978-0-8878-0364-2 OCLC 35972578	
1997	Couleurs Troubles	Red Deer Press	ISBN 978-2-8905-1646-5 OCLC 36694605	
1999	Roid Rage	Harbour Publishing	ISBN 978-1-5501-7206-5 OCLC 40940413	
2002	Refuge Cove	Orca Book Publishers	ISBN 978-1-5514-3418-6 OCLC 190775200	
2004	Smoke and Mirrors	Boardwalk Books	ISBN 978-1-5500-2534-7 OCLC 56329303	
2004	Thunderbowl	Orca Book Publishers	ISBN 978-1-5514-3444-5 OCLC 190789324	
2005	Sudden Impact	Orca Book Publishers	ISBN 978-1-5514-3476-6 OCLC 60798179	
2006	Deconstructing Dylan	Dundurn Press	ISBN 978-1-5500-2603-0 OCLC 63125414	
2007	Wave Warrior	Orca Book Publishers	ISBN 978-1-5514-3651-7 OCLC 190823590	
2008	Skate Freak	Orca Book Publishers	ISBN 978-1-5546-9043-5 OCLC 228667487	
2008	Hell's Hotel	James Lorimer & Company	ISBN 978-1-5527-7038-2 OCLC 242059264	
2009	Living Outside the Lines	Red Deer Press	ISBN 978-0-8899-5435-9 OCLC 528728707	
2009	Last Chance	James Lorimer & Company	ISBN 978-1-5527-7445-8 OCLC 317743639	
2009	Los Pandemonium	Orca Book Publishers	ISBN 978-1-5514-3590-9 OCLC 714568860	
2009	Rock!	Hase und Igel	ISBN 978-3-8676-0097-2 OCLC 638368227	
2009	Running the Risk	Orca Book Publishers	ISBN 978-1-5546-9027-5 OCLC 714568862	
2010	Random: A Novel	Red Deer Press	ISBN 978-0-8899-5443-4 OCLC 744495887	
2010	Reckless	Orca Book Publishers	ISBN 978-1-5546-9225-5 OCLC 759836600	
2011	Gone Bad	James Lorimer & Company	ISBN 978-1-5527-7709-1 OCLC 693657636	
2011	Dumb Luck	Red Deer Press	ISBN 978-0-8899-5465-6 OCLC 704380790	
2011	Zee's Way	Orca Book Publishers	ISBN 978-1-5514-3448-3 OCLC 811405687	
2012	Accro d'la Planche	Orca Book Publishers	ISBN 978-1-4598-0195-0 OCLC 991213063	
2012	Breaking Point	Orca Book Publishers	ISBN 978-1-4598-0130-1 OCLC 1037467388	
2012	Rat	Orca Book Publishers	ISBN 978-1-4598-0302-2 OCLC 811564928	
2013	Crash	Orca Book Publishers	ISBN 978-1-4598-0523-1 OCLC 836189568	
2013	Jeremy Stone	Red Deer Press	ISBN 978-0-8899-5504-2 OCLC 854936681	
2014	Into the Wasteland	Red Deer Press	ISBN 978-0-8899-5522-6 OCLC 884480513	
2015	Off the Grid	Orca Book Publishers	ISBN 978-1-4598-0928-4 OCLC 892779163	
2016	Scam	Orca Book Publishers	ISBN 978-1-4598-1175-1 OCLC 912021496	
2017	Identify	Orca Book Publishers	ISBN 978-1-4598-1407-3 OCLC 953887165	
2017	Closing Down Heaven	Red Deer Press	ISBN 978-0-8899-5543-1 OCLC 979991734	
2017	Thin Places	Dundurn Press	ISBN 978-1-4597-3958-1 OCLC 965746847	
2018	The Thing You're Good At	Orca Book Publishers	ISBN 978-1-4598-1805-7 OCLC 1035244498	
2018	Kryptonite	Orca Book Publishers	ISBN 978-1-4598-1657-2 OCLC 1009052996	
2018	Plank's Law	Orca Book Publishers	ISBN 978-1-4598-1250-5 OCLC 1313254446	
2020	The Ledge	Orca Book Publishers	ISBN 978-1-4598-2462-1 OCLC 1112356888	
2021	The Rules Have Changed	Orca Book Publishers	ISBN 978-1-4598-2682-3 OCLC 1158015898	
2022	Face the Music	Orca Book Publishers	ISBN 978-1-4598-3289-3 OCLC 1241199420	
2025	In The Kingdom of Cheese There Are No Heroes	Moose House Publications	ISBN 978-1-9981-4969-8 OCLC 1499591813	

== Poetry ==
List of poetry by Lesley Choyce
Year	Title	Publisher	Identifiers	Notes
1982	Re-inventing the Wheel	Fiddle Head Poetry Books	ISBN 978-0-9201-1093-5 OCLC 7632282	
1982	Fast Living	Fiddle Head Poetry Books	ISBN 978-0-8649-2026-3 OCLC 10080713	
1985	The End of Ice	Fiddle Head Poetry Books	ISBN 978-0-8649-2054-6 OCLC 12674467	
1986	To the Top of the Heart	Thistledown Press	ISBN 978-0-9206-3312-0 OCLC 14179134	
1988	The Man Who Borrowed the Bay of Fundy	Brandon University	ISBN 978-0-9209-1629-2 OCLC 22278961	
1995	The Coastline of Forgetting	Pottersfield Press	ISBN 978-0-9190-0195-4 OCLC 34647459	
1998	Beautiful Sadness	Ekstatis Editions	ISBN 978-1-8968-6030-5 OCLC 38758099	
2000	Caution to the Wind	Ekstatis Editions	ISBN 9781896860725 OCLC 43978119	
2003	Typographical Eras	Gaspereau Press	ISBN 9781894031714 OCLC 53939739	
2004	Revenge of the Optimist	Ekstasis Editions	ISBN 978-1-8948-0043-3 OCLC 52920548	
2008	The Discipline of Ice	Ekstatis Editions	ISBN 978-1-8974-3021-7 OCLC 276644364	
2012	I'm Alive. I Believe in Everything.	Breton Books	ISBN 978-1-9269-0817-5 OCLC 816765740	
2012	All Alone at the End of the World	Ekstasis Editions	ISBN 978-1-7717-1063-3 OCLC 884616489	
2017	Climbing Knocknarea	Ekstasis Editions	ISBN 978-1-7717-1243-9 OCLC 1004353269	
2020	In Praise of Small Mistakes	Ekstasis Editions	ISBN 978-1-7717-1388-7 OCLC 1149147631	
2023	Never the Same Sea Twice	Ekstasis Editions	ISBN 978-1-7717-1497-6 OCLC 1346259692	

== Discography ==
List of musical works by Lesley Choyce
Year	Title	Publisher	Identifiers	Notes
1996	Long Lost Planet	Pottersfield Press; Harbourmaster Music	ISBN 978-1-8959-0003-3 OCLC 63549825 OCLC 229137697	
1998	Sea Level	Pottersfield Press	ISBN 978-1-8959-0022-4 OCLC 43307451	
2021	The Trouble With Everything	Pottersfield Press; Harbourmaster Music	ISBN 978-1-9897-2547-4 OCLC 1267682875	
