= James Hutton (disambiguation) =

James Hutton (1726–1797) was a Scottish geologist.

James Hutton may also refer to:

- James Hutton (minister) (1715–1795), English Moravian minister and bookseller
- James D. Hutton (c. 1828–1868), American artist, topographer, and pioneer photographer
- James Frederick Hutton (1826–1890), British businessman and colonialist
- James Scott Hutton, first principal of the Halifax School for the Deaf (19th century)
- Jim Hutton (Dana James Hutton) (1934–1979), American actor
- James Hutton (footballer), Scottish footballer (19th century)
- James Hutton (rugby union) (1906–1985), Scottish rugby union player.
