= Literature of Nova Scotia =

Literature of Canadian province

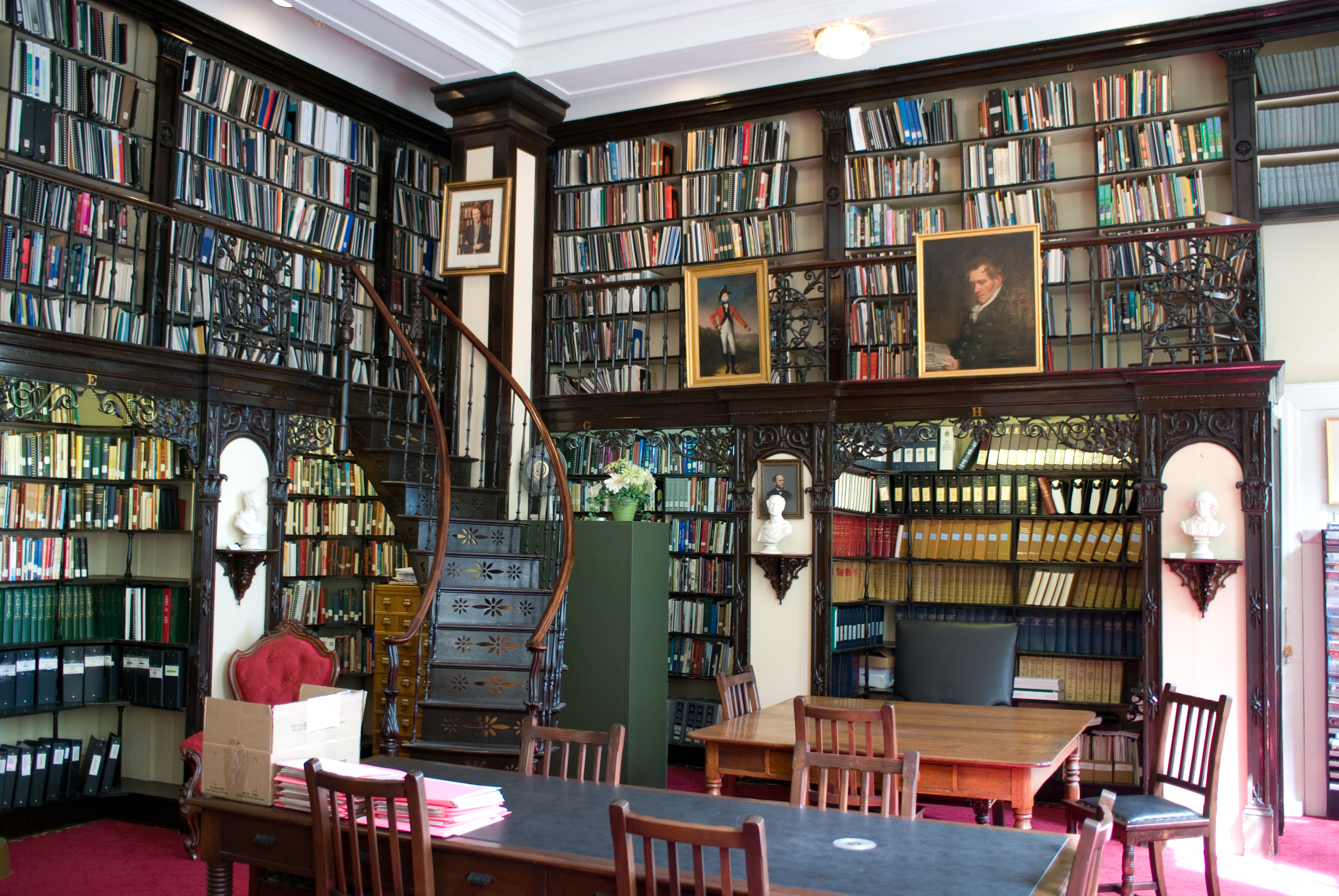
The Nova Scotia Legislative Library is located in Province House in Halifax

The Canadian province of Nova Scotia is home to a rich literary landscape. Literature in the province is primarily written in English, with a small volume of French literature reflecting Acadian culture. Literacy levels in Nova Scotia are generally on par with that of the rest of Canada, although the literacy education methods of the Nova Scotia Department of Education have faced criticism. The province is home to a variety of regional book publishers, and few independent news publishers; SaltWire Network, the province's largest news media company, was purchased by the American-owned company Postmedia Network in 2024, and its headquarters moved to Toronto.

The literature of Nova Scotia is influenced by the traditional storytelling of the Mi'kmaq, the province's Indigenous inhabitants; as well as the Gaelic, who began immigrating to Nova Scotia in the 18th century.

== Languages and literacy ==
Most literature in Nova Scotia is written in English, with a small minority of literature published in French forming a component of Acadian culture in the province.

In 2003, 61.6% of adults aged 16-65 in Nova Scotia had the necessary literacy level to "function effectively in the modern knowledge-based economy", according to the Statistics Canada 2003 International Adult Literacy and Skills Survey. Nova Scotia had the highest literacy score out of all of the Atlantic provinces in the survey, outperforming in all four skill areas measured: prose literacy, document literacy, numeracy, and problem solving. The 2003 survey was the first time that literacy data specific to Nova Scotia was made available, although literacy rates in the Canadian and Atlantic region had not changed substantially since the prior survey conducted in 1994.

The 2012 Programme for the International Assessment of Adult Competencies (PIAAC) survey reported an average literacy score in the province of 273.9, slightly above the OECD average of 273.3.

The Nova Scotia Department of Education has a balanced literacy approach to teaching literacy in schools. In 2022, the department adopted an additional literacy strategy centred on phonics, a method of teaching children to read. Critics argue that the department's literacy strategy is ineffective, blaming it for provincial assessments showing a below-average reading level for one in three students in Grade 3.

== Written literature ==
Nova Scotia and the Maritime provinces were primarily settled by the French in the first half of the 18th century. The first permanent English settlement in the province was established in 1749 at Halifax, and the province saw significant immigration of Loyalists from the United States following the American Revolutionary War. Maritime literature of the time is thus categorized into two periods: Pre-Loyalist, encompassing works produced between 1720 and 1783; and Loyalist, encompassing works produced between 1783 and 1815. The Loyalist period is generally considered to also include works differing greatly from those produced by the Loyalists themselves, such as works written by British officials and nonconformists. Notable works of this period include A Narrative of an Extraordinary Escape out of the Hands of the Indians in the Gulf of St. Lawrence (1760) and A Providential Escape after a Shipwreck in Coming from the Island of St. John by Gamaliel Smethurst, who served as the Controller of Customs and Deputy Surveyor General in Nova Scotia; and Poems on Various Occasions (1745) by John Adams, who was brought to Annapolis Royal as a child, and later became ordained to preach at Rhode Island.

Nova Scotian literature began to take form in the early 19th century, with notable writers of the period including Thomas Chandler Haliburton and Thomas McCulloch. Throughout the twentieth century, the province's literary output remained strong, producing writers such as Charles Tory Bruce, Thomas Raddall, and Alden Nowlan.

== Oral literature ==
The oral literature of the Mi'kmaq people, the Indigenous inhabitants of Nova Scotia, forms an integral part of the province's literary heritage. The Mi'kmaq maintain a tradition of storytelling, with their oral literature encompassing myths, legends, and historical narratives. Their storytelling often conveys the cultural values, spiritual beliefs, and environmental knowledge cultivated by the Mi'kmaq over generations.

In the 19th century, Silas Tertius Rand, a missionary and linguist, played a significant role in documenting Mi'kmaq stories and legends. Rand, who learned the Mi'kmaq language, was the first to record the legend of Glooscap and compiled a dictionary of the Mi'kmaq language.

Canadian Gaelic storytelling in Nova Scotia dates back to the 18th century, when many Gaels immigrated to Nova Scotia as a result of social and economic hardships in Scotland. Up to 50,000 people in Nova Scotia spoke the Gaelic language in the early 20th century.

== Publication ==
Nova Scotia has a variety of regional publishers. Formac Publishing Company was established in 1977 in Halifax and has published over 700 books by over 600 different authors. Pottersfield Press, a small publisher focused on books of regional interest, was founded in 1979 by Lesley Choyce, a Nova Scotian writer. Nimbus Publishing, founded in 1978, also publishes primarily books of regional interest. Fernwood Publishing was founded in 1991 in Halifax and publishes books concerning social justice, politics, and economics. Gaspereau Press was established in 1977, and is based in Kentville. The defunct publisher Lancelot Press operated from 1968 until 1996, and was based in Hantsport.

== News and mass media ==
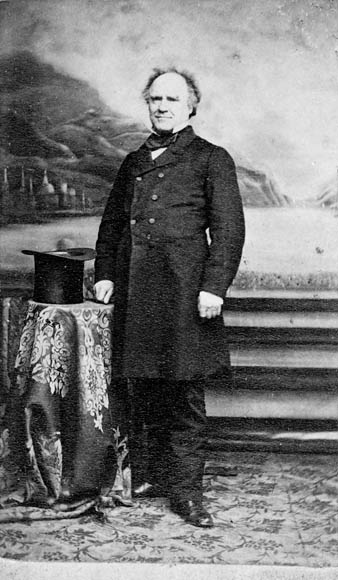
The libel trial of Joseph Howe is considered to have established the basis for freedom of the press in Canada

Halifax, Nova Scotia was home to the first newspaper in Canada, the Halifax Gazette, first printed on 23 March 1752 by John Bushell. After undergoing several name changes, the newspaper was sanctioned as the official government publication of Nova Scotia, receiving the name Nova Scotia Royal Gazette in 1867. The name was shortened to Royal Gazette in 1999, and continues to be published by Nova Scotia's Office of the Registrar of Regulations. There is only a single remaining copy of the first issue of the Halifax Gazette, located at a Library and Archives Canada facility in Ottawa.

The Nova Scotia Magazine and Comprehensive Review of Literature, Politics, and News was the first literary journal in Canada, started by the scholar William Cochran, the first president of the University of King's College in Windsor, who edited the magazine. It was printed in Halifax by John Howe, the father of Joseph Howe, from July 1789 to March 1792.

In December 1827, Joseph Howe took over the Halifax-based newspaper the Novascotian, with the newspaper gaining significant popularity and influence for its reporting on the Nova Scotia House of Assembly. In 1835, Howe was charged with seditious libel for a letter critical of Halifax politicians published in the Novascotian. Howe's acquittal in the case is considered to have established the basis for freedom of the press in Canada.

SaltWire Network was a major contemporary news publisher in Nova Scotia, founded in Halifax in 2017 with the purchase of 27 newspapers from Transcontinental. The company owned newspapers in the province such as The Chronicle Herald in Halifax and the Cape Breton Post in Sydney, which is the only daily newspaper in Cape Breton. SaltWire entered creditor protection in March 2024, and was subsequently acquired by Postmedia Network, an American-owned media conglomerate, in August 2024. Saltwire was rebranded as PNI Atlantic News and its headquarters relocated to Toronto in December 2024. The Coast, a Halifax newspaper founded in 1993, remained independent until 2022 when it was acquired by Overstory Media Group. Nova Scotia's remaining independent publications include the Halifax Examiner, based in Halifax; and The Laker, based in Enfield. The province's Acadian community is served by Le Courrier de la Nouvelle-Écosse, a French-language newspaper founded in 1937 in Meteghan River.

== Literary awards ==
=== Atlantic Book Awards ===
The Atlantic Book Awards & Festival is an annual event commemorating Atlantic Canadian writers and literature. The awards and festival are operated by the Atlantic Book Awards Society, a non-profit organization based in Halifax. Five literary awards are presented to writers from Atlantic Canada at the event in recognition of their work.

=== Dartmouth Book Awards ===
The Dartmouth Book Awards was established in 1988 by John Savage, and celebrates Nova Scotian writers of fiction and non-fiction. The awards are now managed by the Atlantic Book Awards Society.

== Organizations ==
=== Writers' Federation of Nova Scotia ===
The Writers' Federation of Nova Scotia (WFNS) is a non-profit literary organization serving writers in Nova Scotia. With financial support from the provincial government, the WFNS offers a "Writers in Schools" program wherein Nova Scotian writers provide presentations and workshops in schools. The program is intended to support youth literacy in the province, and has been received positively by school staff and students. The Writers' Federation of Nova Scotia was the winner of the Creative Community Impact Award at the 2024 Creative Nova Scotia Awards.

=== Literacy Nova Scotia ===
Literacy Nova Scotia is a non-profit charitable organization in Nova Scotia with the stated goal of supporting equal access to literacy and education opportunities. The organization received funding from the Canadian federal government until cuts to adult literacy programs in 2014, in which federal funding was shifted from Literacy Nova Scotia and other programs to the Canada Jobs Grant.

== See also ==
- Acadian literature
- Indigenous literatures in Canada
- Canadian literature
- Literacy in Canada
