= Vivian Berkeley =

Canadian competitive lawn bowler

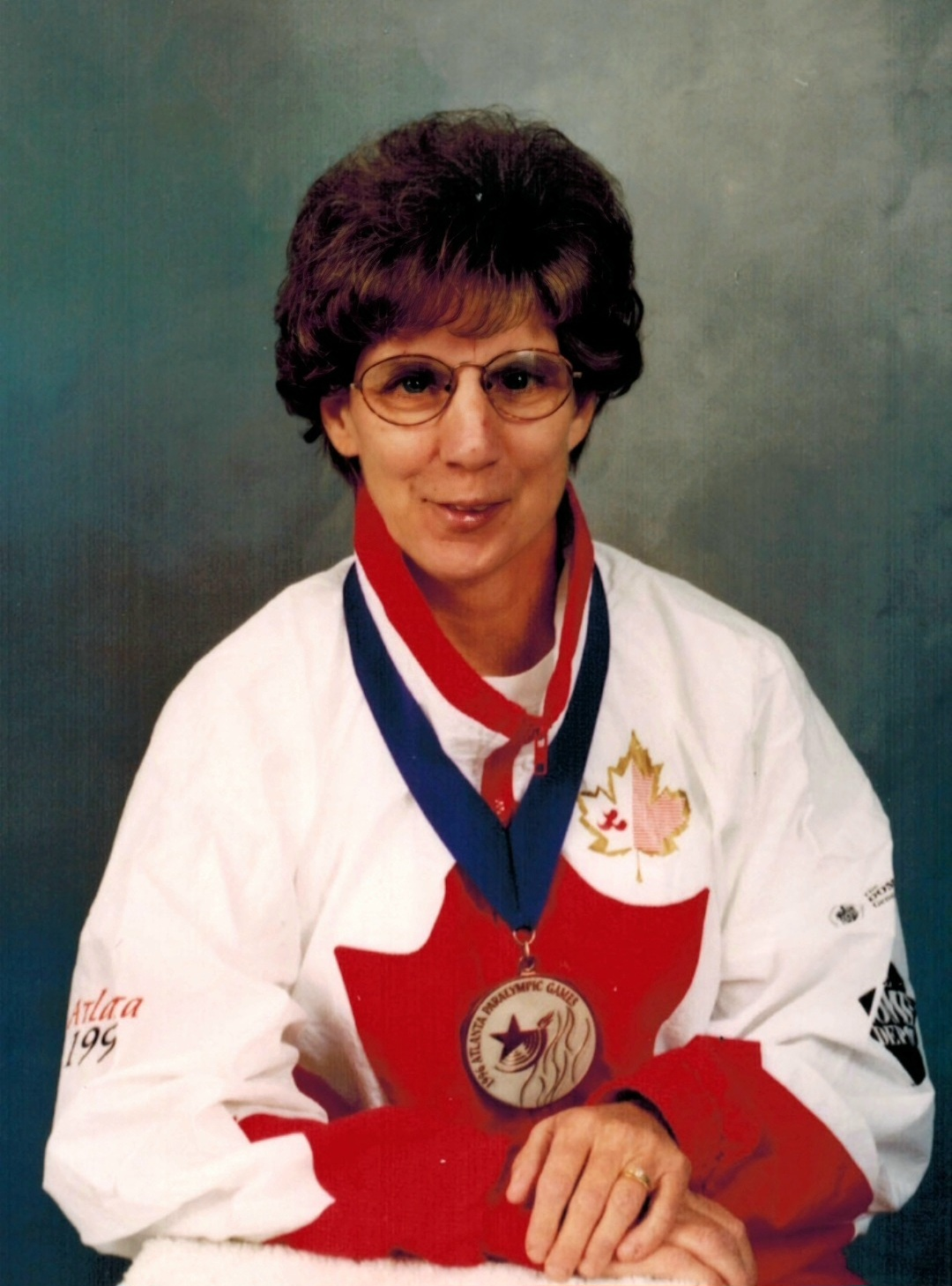
1996 Paralympic Games Silver Medalist (Atlanta, Georgia, USA)

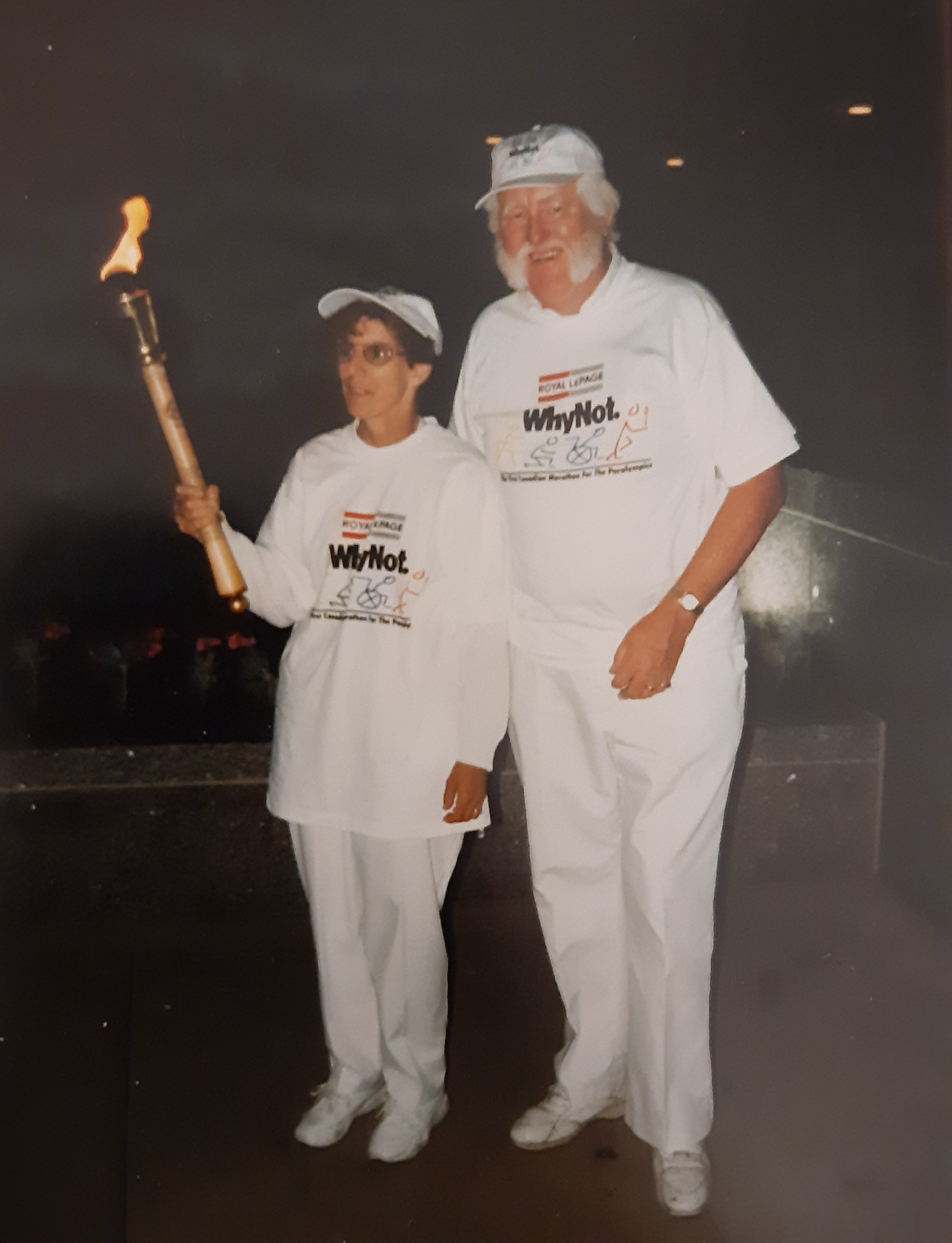
1996 Paralympic Games Torch Relay. Vivian Berkeley & Coach Don Mayne (July 10, 1996) (Kitchener, Ontario, Canada)

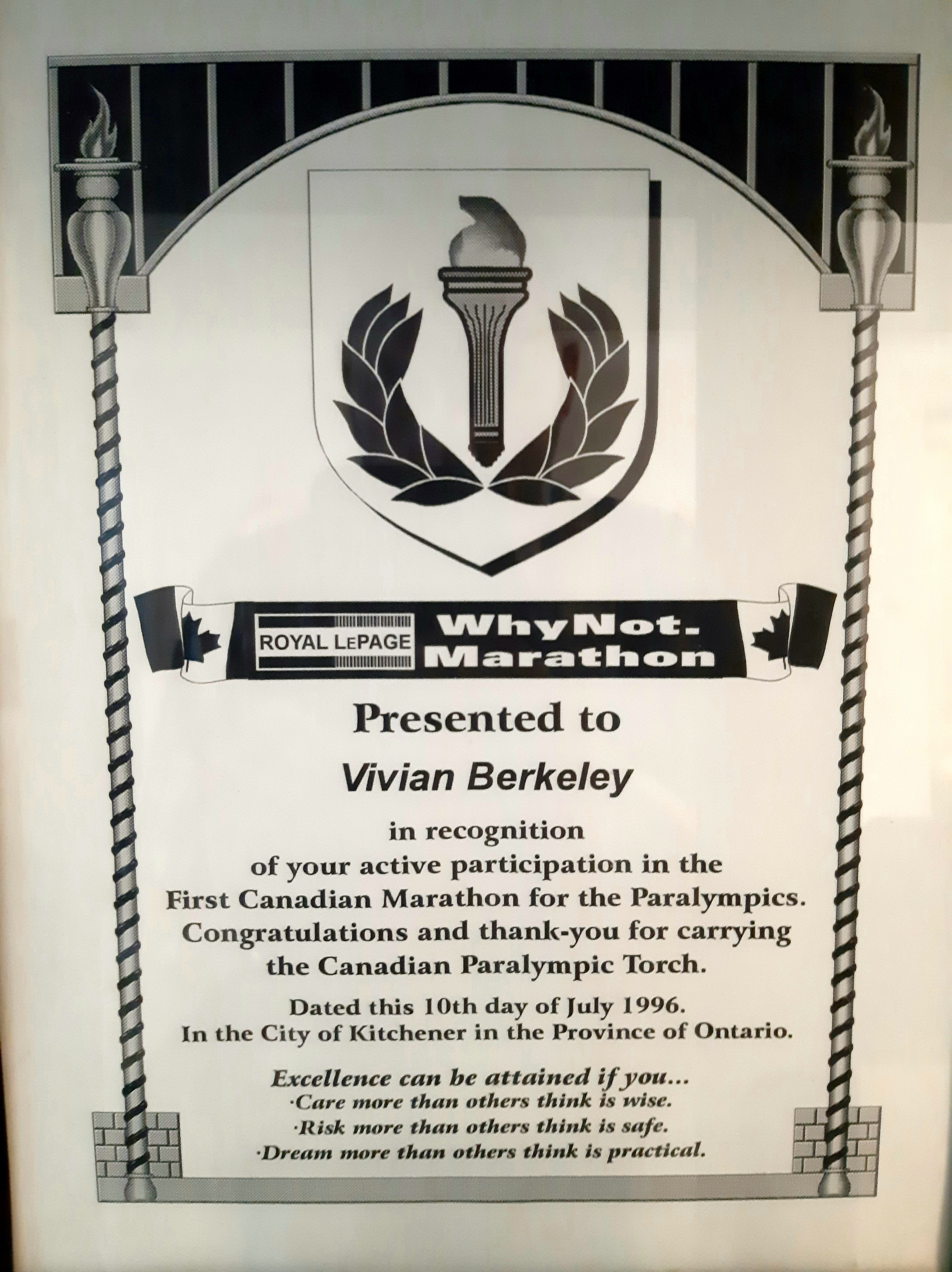
1996 Paralympic Games Torch Marathon Award (July 10, 1996)

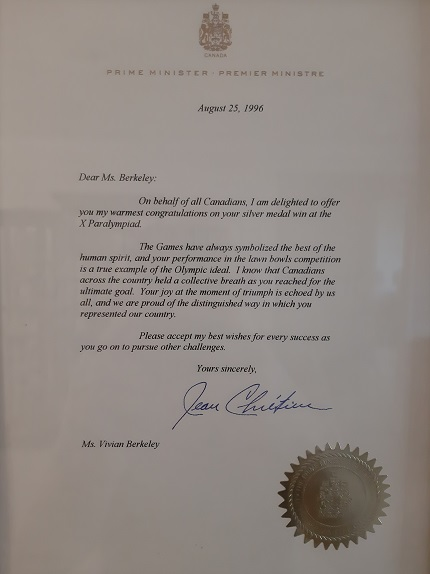
Letter from Prime Minister Jean Chrétien (August 25, 1996)

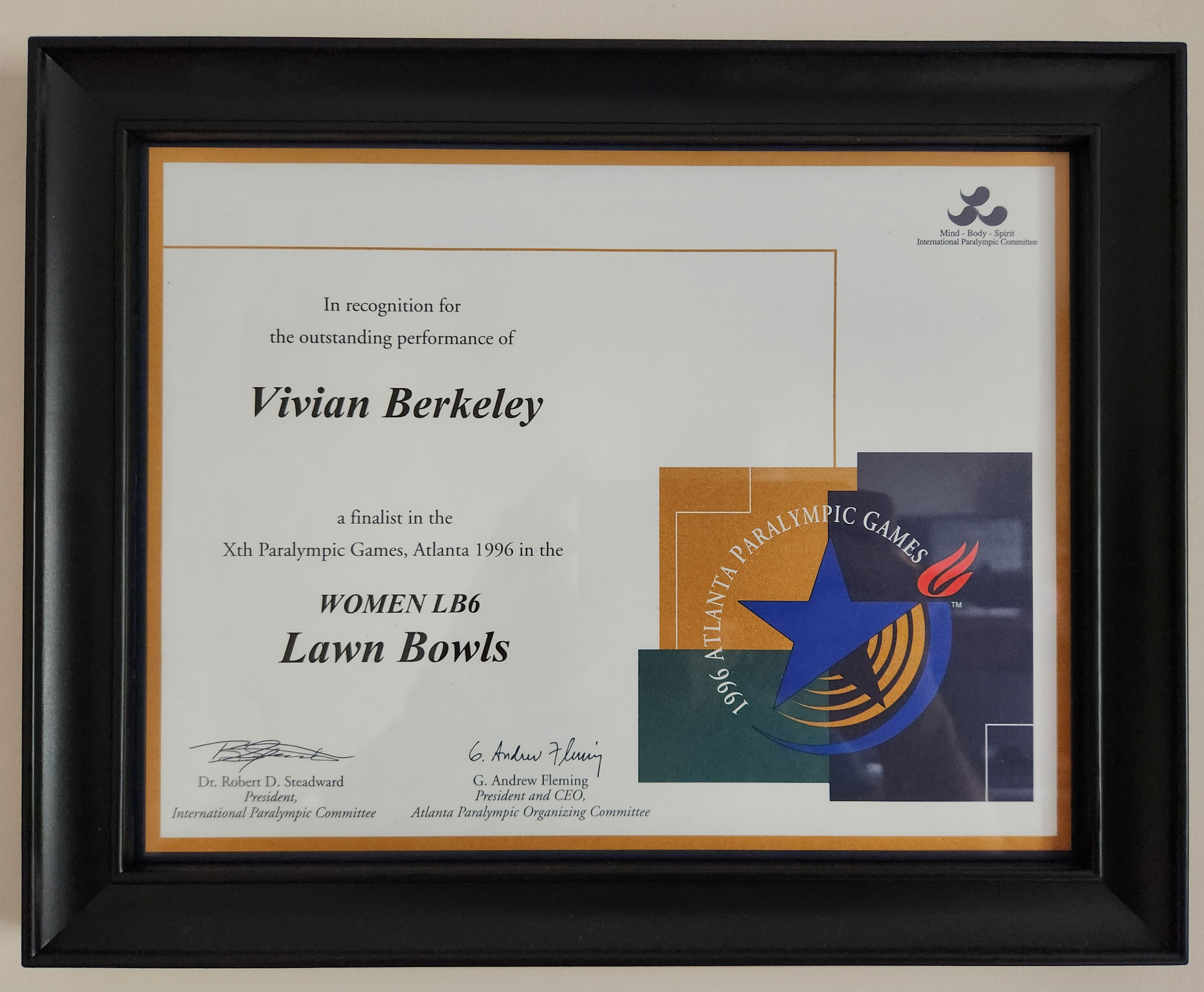
1996 Paralympic Games Award (September 1, 1996)

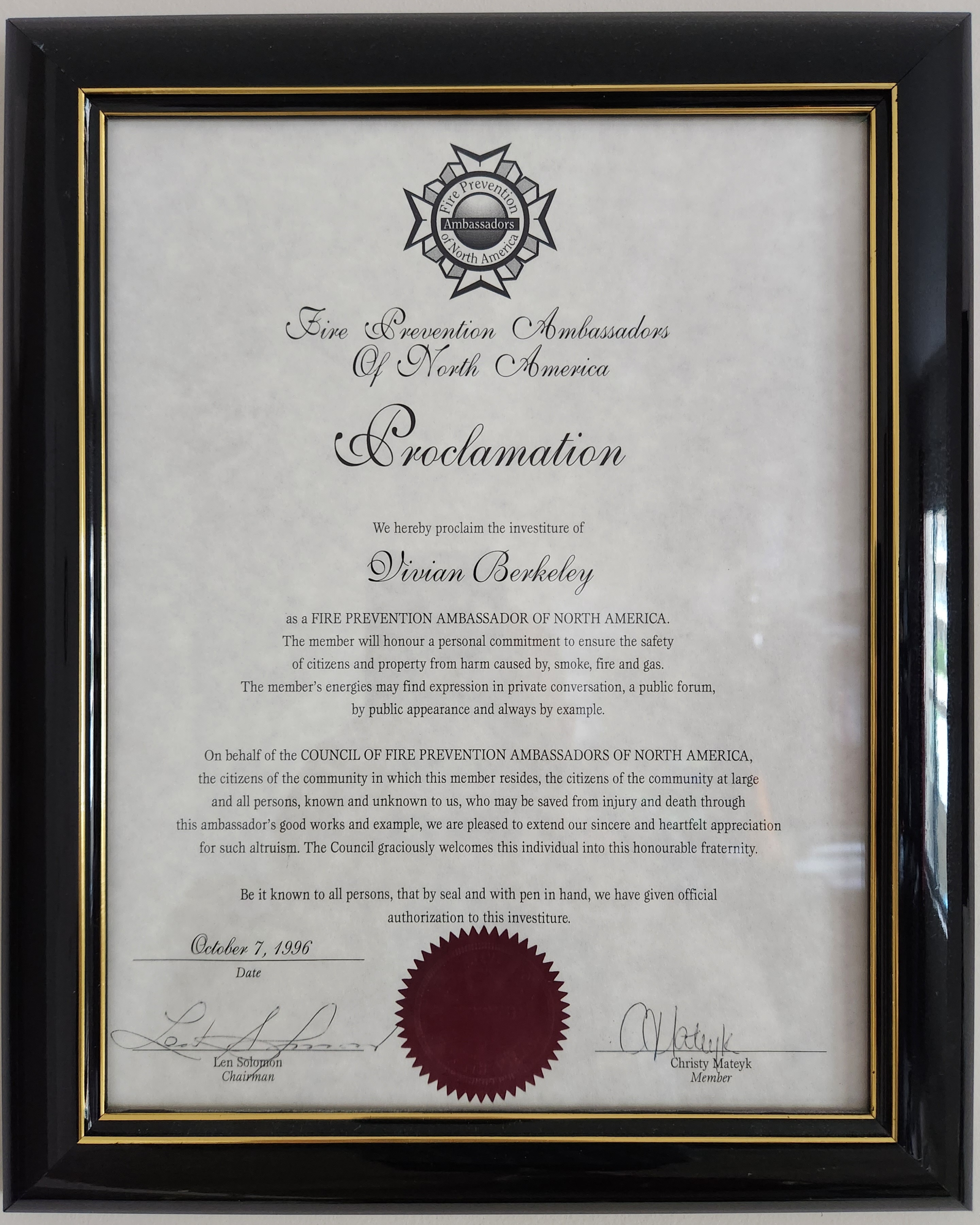
Fire Prevention Ambassador of North America (October 7, 1996)

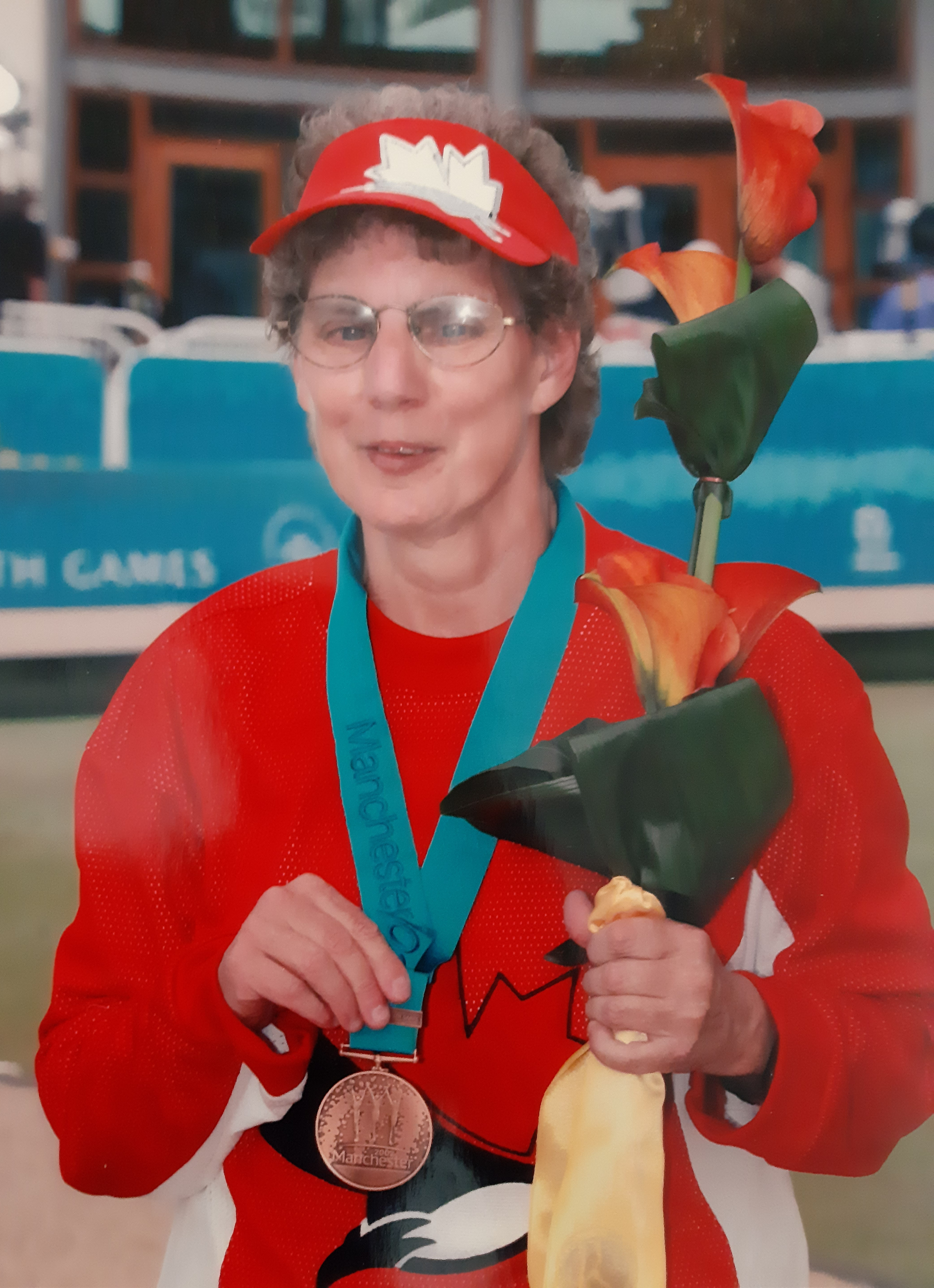
2002 Commonwealth Games Bronze Medalist (August 1, 2002) (Manchester, England)

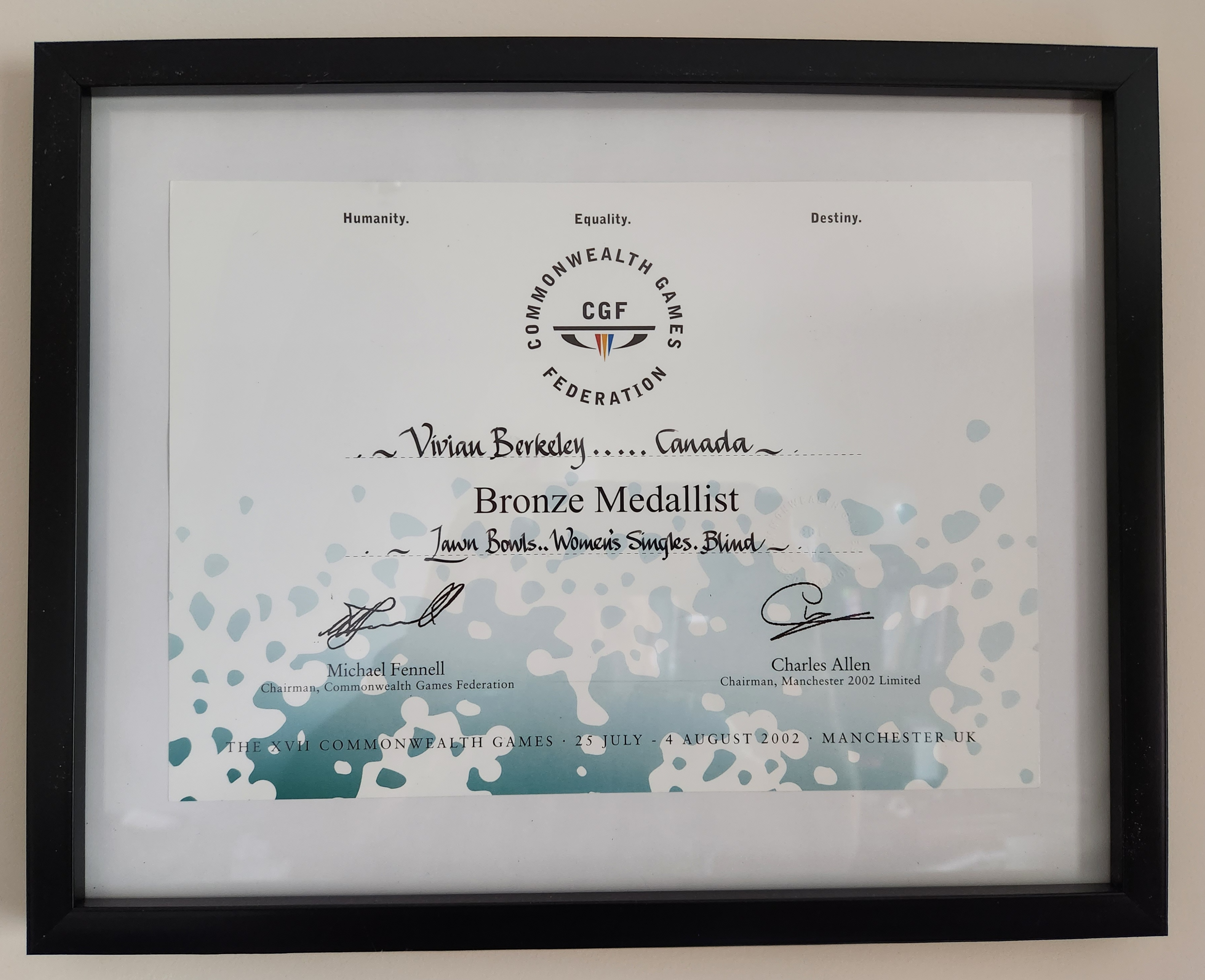
2002 Commonwealth Games Award (August 4, 2002)

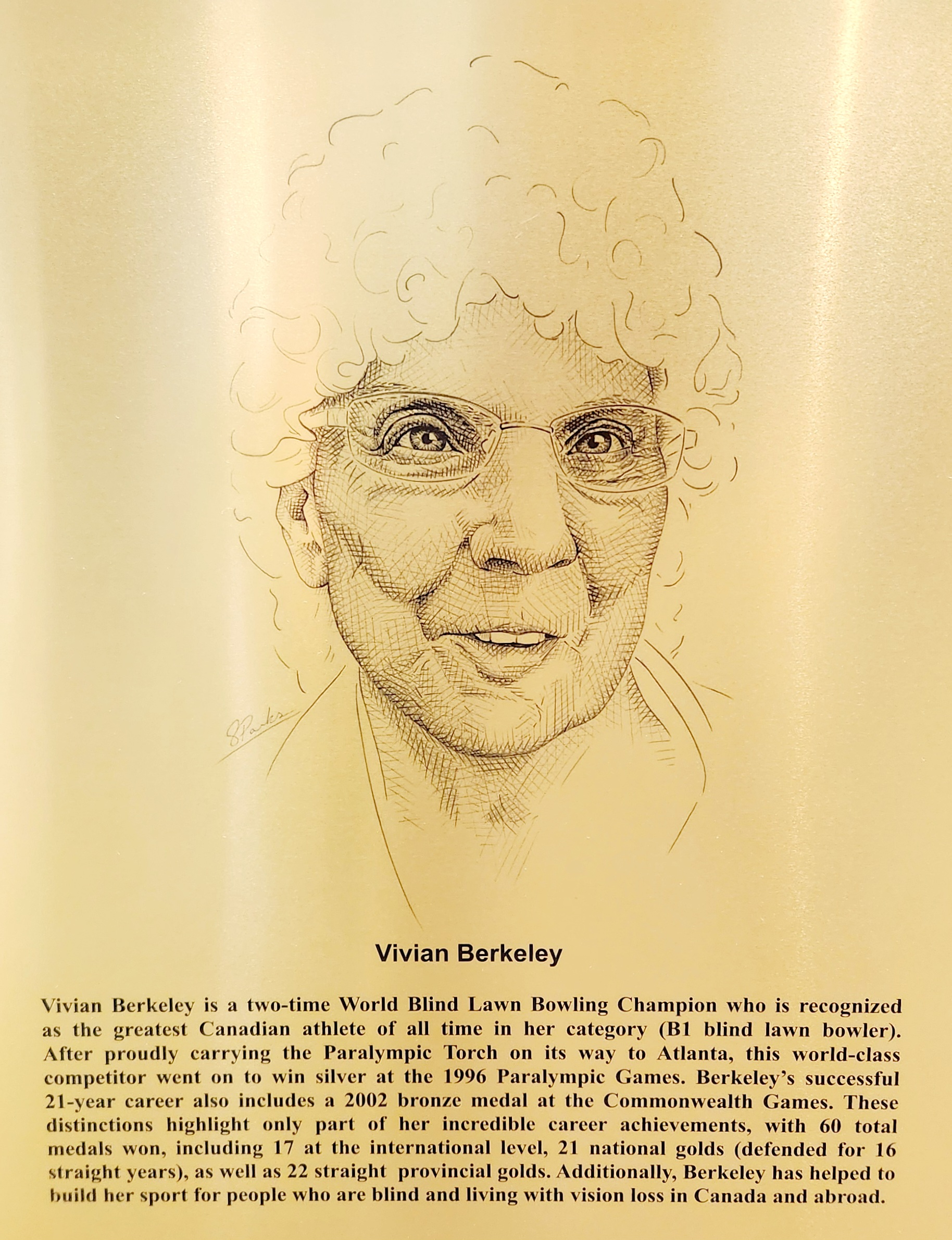
2021 Canadian Disability Hall of Fame Induction Plaque (Toronto, Ontario, Canada) (November 7, 2021)

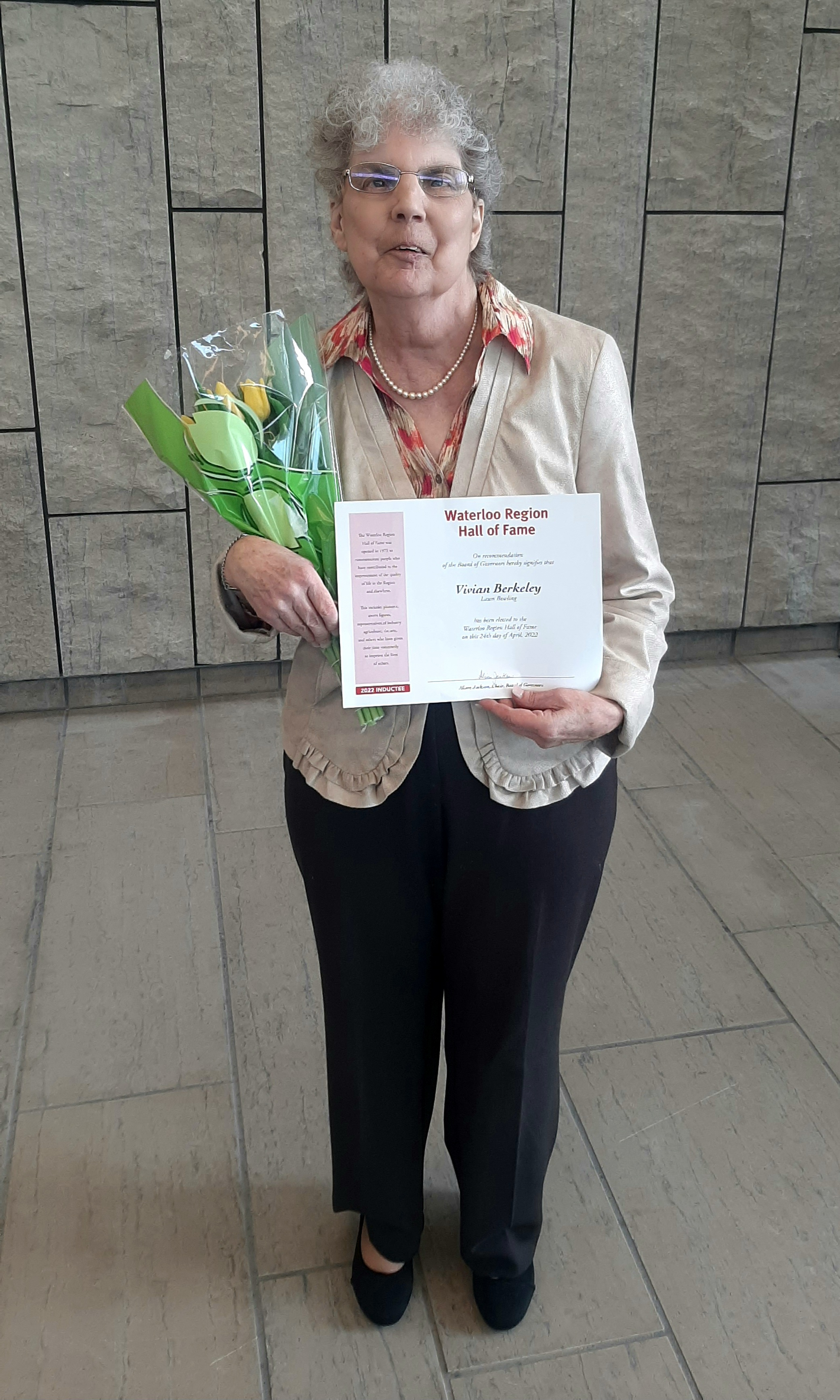
2022 Waterloo Region Hall of Fame Induction & Award (April 24, 2022) (Kitchener, Ontario, Canada)

Vivian Berkeley (August 9, 1941 - March 17, 2025) was a Canadian two-time World Blind Lawn Bowling Champion,1996 Paralympic Games Silver Medalist and 2002 Commonwealth Games Bronze Medalist.

Over her 21-year decorated career (1994–2015), Vivian would accumulate a total of 60 medals; including 22 straight Provincial Gold medals, 21 National Gold medals (16 straight), along with an impressive 17 International medals from 8 countries (2 Gold, 10 Silver, 5 Bronze). Berkeley is accredited to helping build the sport of lawn bowls for the blind and visually-impaired in Canada and abroad.

On November 7, 2021, Vivian was Inducted into the Canadian Disability Hall of Fame (CDHF). Founded by the Canadian Foundation for Physically Disabled Persons (CFPDP), this public exhibit is located in Metro Hall in downtown Toronto Ontario, and is where an honorary plaque with her name and etching of her portrait is on display. The Induction Ceremony took place on October 20, 2022, at the Fairmont Royal York in downtown Toronto.

On April 24, 2022, Vivian was Inducted into the Waterloo Region Hall of Fame located on the second floor of the Ken Seiling Waterloo Region Museum in Kitchener Ontario. The Induction Ceremony took place at the same location.

On April 28, 2023, Vivian was Inducted into the Ontario Lawn Bowls Association Hall of Fame. The Induction Ceremony took place in Oakville Ontario.

On June 13, 2023, Vivian was Inducted into the Glace Bay Old Town Hall Museum, located in her hometown of Glace Bay Nova Scotia.

"As an athlete I feel that year-round physical training and mental preparation are the keys to success. To reach your goals you must be prepared to be persistent and dedicated to your sport. An athlete must be able to accept winning as well as defeat, and meet new challenges head on. In order to succeed in any sport, this philosophy should be applied on a daily basis." - Vivian Berkeley

== Personal life ==
Born in Glace Bay, Nova Scotia, Vivian received her primary and secondary schooling at the Halifax School for the Blind, in Halifax, Nova Scotia, where she won a trophy in competitive swimming, before graduating in the mid-1950s. Vivian would move to Kitchener, Ontario, in 1968, where she would work in the radiology department at Grand River Hospital for eight years, as a darkroom technician. After leaving her job at the hospital, Vivian would become an in-classroom teachers aide for the Waterloo Catholic District School Board, two days a week, for 16 years. She also delivered the K-W Record newspaper for several years and took up the hobby of breeding budgie birds. Berkeley has always been very involved within her community, contributing to many committees and service groups. Her main objective, to improve the safety, mobility, and well-being of the blind and visually-impaired in the Waterloo Region. Vivian was married for over 52 years to her late husband, Richard Douglas Berkeley (1941–2024). Vivian has two children Laura-Lee and Michael, and a granddaughter Samantha. She also recently had a guide dog, a black Labrador retriever named Angora (2009–2024). In her spare time Vivian enjoys knitting afghans, puzzles, audio books, and listening to her favourite team the Toronto Blue Jays, as she "loves Jerry Howarth's work."

== Lawn Bowls Career ==
=== Non-competitive play (1989–1993) ===
Berkeley's lawn bowling career has span over 25 years, beginning in 1989. At the time she was also competing in Shuffleboard on the provincial level, along with five-pin and ten-pin bowling. Vivian initially played out of the Rockway Golf and Country Club in Kitchener, Ontario, however its lawn bowling club was forced to close at the end of 1996 for the expansion of its golf course. The following year, a new local lawn bowling club would open its doors, Heritage Greens. For the first several years, Vivian would just play one night a week with the other blind and visually-impaired members. Berkeley has had several coaches throughout her career, all of them playing a pivotal role in helping her achieve success, including Don Mayne (1989–2004), Jean McCron (2005–2013), and Betty Mayne (2014–2015) (Don's wife), to name a few. Vivian stated that "I started (lawn) bowls because I enjoy sports and the challenge of competitions."

=== Competitive career (1994–2015) ===
==== Provincial ====
1994–2015	Ontario Blind Bowls Association (OBBA)	1st
TOTAL NUMBER OF GOLD MEDALS		22

==== National ====
1994	Canadian Blind Sports Association (CBSA)	4th
1995–1997	Canadian Blind Sports Association	1st
1998	Canadian Blind Sports Association	3rd
1999–2006	Canadian Blind Sports Association	1st
2007–2015	Blind Bowls Association of Canada (BBAC)	1st
TOTAL NUMBER OF GOLD MEDALS (Singles Competition = 19 / Pairs = 2)		21

==== International ====
1995	International Paralympic Committee (IPC) World Championships	Worthing, England	4th
1996	10th Paralympic Games	Atlanta, United States	2nd
1997	6th International Blind Bowls Association (IBBA) Championships	Hamilton, New Zealand	4th
1998	International Paralympic Committee (IPC) World Championships	Germiston, South Africa	2nd
1999	International Tri-AM Mixed Pairs	Paisley, Scotland	2nd
2000	International Lawn Bowls Open	Tel Aviv, Israel	2nd
2001	7th International Blind Bowls Association (IBBA) Championships	Girvan, Scotland	3rd
2002	International Paralympic Committee (IPC) World Championships	Adelaide, Australia	1st
2002	17th Commonwealth Games	Manchester, England	3rd
2004	International Paralympic Committee (IPC) World Championships	Kuala Lumpur, Malaysia	3rd
2004	International Paralympic Committee (IPC) World Championships Pairs	Kuala Lumpur, Malaysia	3rd
2005	8th International Blind Bowls Association (IBBA) Championships	Johannesburg, South Africa	2nd
2006	International Paralympic Committee (IPC) World Championships Quadram	Edinburgh, Scotland	1st
2007	International Bowls for the Disabled (IBD) World Championships	Sydney, Australia	2nd
2007	International Bowls for the Disabled (IBD) World Championships Pairs	Sydney, Australia	3rd
2009	9th International Blind Bowls Association (IBBA) Championships	Melbourne, Australia	2nd
2010	International Lawn Bowls Championships for the Blind (ILBCB)	Tel Aviv, Israel	2nd
2010	International Lawn Bowls Championships for the Blind (ILBCB) Pairs	Tel Aviv, Israel	2nd
2011	International Bowls for the Disabled (IBD) World Championships	Pretoria, South Africa	2nd
2013	10th International Blind Bowls Association (IBBA) Championships	Worthing, England	4th
TOTAL NUMBER OF MEDALS (2 Gold, 10 Silver, 5 Bronze) (Singles Competition = 2 Gold, 8 Silver, 3 Bronze / Pairs = 2 Silver, 2 Bronze)			17

== Awards and honours ==
- Paralympic Games Torch Bearer - Royal LePage WhyNot Marathon in Kitchener. PICTURE INCLUDED (1996)
- Fire Prevention Ambassador of North America - Inducted alongside local sports heroes Professional Boxing Champion Fitz Vanderpool and National Softball Champion Karen Snelgrove. PICTURE INCLUDED (1996)
- Kitchener Sports Association (KSA) Wall of Fame - Paralympics profile picture on display inside the Kitchener Memorial Auditorium. PICTURE INCLUDED (1996)
- House of Commons Canada - Recognized with other members of the Olympic and Paralympic Summer Games, such as Donovan Bailey and Clara Hughes. TRANSCRIPT (1996)
- Letter from Prime Minister, Jean Chretien. "On behalf of all Canadians, I am delighted to offer you my warmest congratulations on your silver medal win at the X Paralympiad." PICTURE INCLUDED (1996)
- Meeting Walter Gretzky. "He (Walter) recognized me from a previous meeting and approached me. “Don (Mayne) and I met him in Scotland in 1999 and had dinner with him at his expense. He knew about my lawn bowling” - Vivian Berkeley (1999)
- Chatelaine Presents Who's Who of Canadian Women 1999-2000 magazine feature (1999)
- Represented Canada at the Commonwealth Games as the oldest athlete at age 61 (2002)
- Lions Foundation of Canada - Life Membership Recipient (2006)
- AthletesCAN Paralympic Athlete Council - Elected as an Interim Member for a meeting in Whitehorse, Yukon (2007)
- International Blind Bowls Association (IBBA) - Elected to the World Executive (2009)
- Guide Dogs for the Blind Alumni photograph of Vivian, her new guide dog Angora and her puppy raisers. (2010)
- Guide Dogs for the Blind Newsletter - Article written by Vivian about her previous guide dog Paka (2011)
- Competed at the Blind and Visually-Impaired Curling Provincials (2011)
- Award Recipient from Heritage Greens Lawn Bowling Club in Kitchener. "In recognition for the work she has done for the visually-impaired in lawn bowling." Picture Included (2011)
- City of Kitchener Athletic Awards - Award Recipient (1989–2013)
- Canadian Disability Hall of Fame (CDHF) - Honorary plaque with her name and etching of her portrait on display inside Metro Hall, Toronto, Ontario (2021)

== Community Involvement ==
- Blind Bowls Association of Canada (BBAC) Past-President. Established by Berkeley to represent and promote the interests of blind and visually-impaired lawn bowlers locally and abroad (2007)
- Canadian Council of the Blind (CCB) Director of Public Relations, Kitchener District Club (1969–1973)
- Canadian Council of the Blind (CCB) President, Kitchener District Club (1991–2001)
- Canadian National Institute for the Blind (CNIB) Volunteer, Kitchener (1992–1997)
- City of Kitchener Barrier-Free Advisory Committee Member (1994–2012)
- City of Kitchener Fire Safety Committee Member (1997)
- Lioness Club of Kitchener (2005)
- Ontario Lawn Bowls Association of the Blind (OLBAB) President (1997–2001)
- Pioneer Lions Club of Kitchener Past-President (2005–2006)
- Royal Canadian Legion, Branch 50 Kitchener (2008–2017)
- Waterloo Catholic District School Board (WCDSB) Teachers Aid Volunteer (1985–2000) *two days per week
- Waterloo Regional Block Parent Program (1987–1999)
