= James Cuppaidge Cochran =

Anglican priest and editor (1798–1880)

James Cuppaidge Cochran (1798–1880) was an Anglican priest and editor in Lunenburg and Halifax, Nova Scotia. He was a minister at St. John's Anglican Church (Lunenburg) (1825-1852). He also published both the Colonial Churchman (1835-1840) in Lunenburg and later the Church Times in Halifax. While in Halifax, he supported the establishment of the Halifax School for the Deaf. He is the son of Rev. William Cochran (clergyman), the founder of King's College, Nova Scotia.
