= Halifax School for the Blind =

Schools for the blind in Canada

Coordinates: 44.639676°N 63.579025°W

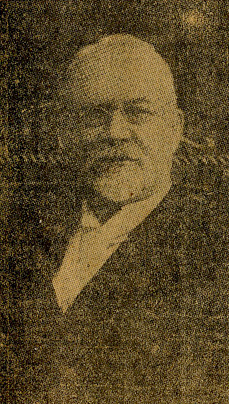
Sir Charles Frederick Fraser in Evening Mail, Toronto 1918

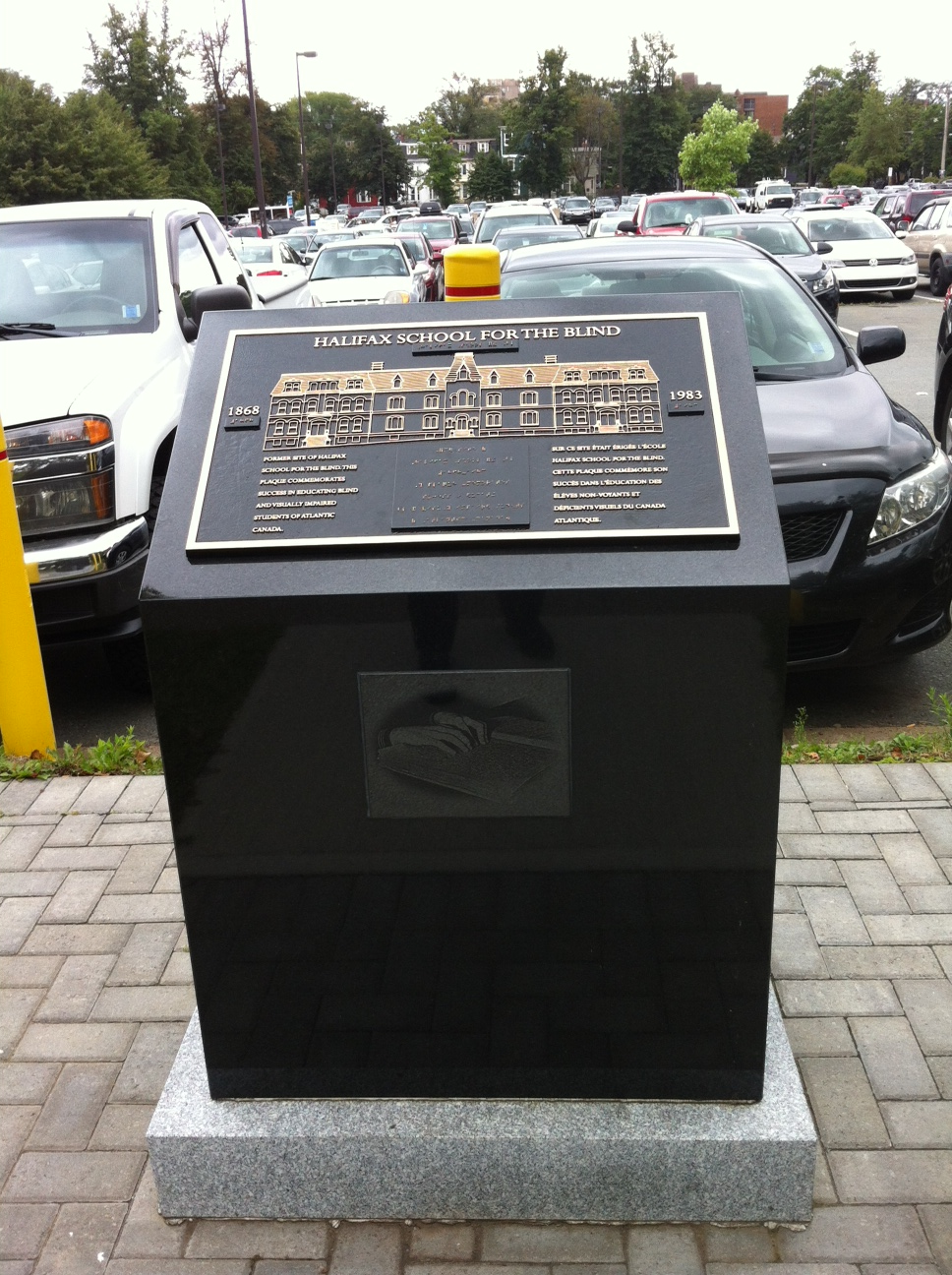
Halifax School For The Blind Monument, University Ave., Halifax, Nova Scotia

The Halifax School for the Blind opened on Morris Street, Halifax, Nova Scotia as the Halifax Asylum for the Blind in 1871, the first residential school for the blind in Canada. The first superintendent of the school (1873-1923) was Sir Frederick Fraser who was himself visually impaired and had studied at the Perkins School for the Blind in Boston.

A private school for the first century of its existence, in 1975 the school became a public institution under the newly created Atlantic Provinces Special Education Authority (APSEA), and it provided free education to pupils from throughout Atlantic Canada.

The school closed in 1983 and was replaced by a new school some blocks away, named Sir Frederick Fraser School for the Blind in memory of the founder. A memorial plaque was placed near the site of the old school in 2012.

The Halifax School for the Deaf was established earlier in 1856. The two schools were consolidated at the APSEA Centre on South Street in 1994-1995.

== Notable students ==
- Arthur A. Chisholm
- Vivian Berkeley
- Eric Davidson
- Terry Kelly
- Fred McKenna

== Notable teachers ==
- Elizabeth Roberts MacDonald

== External links and further reading ==
- Annual Report. 1939
- School for the Blind Image, Notman Studio
- Frederick Fraser: What we do for the Blind, Toronto Star, 1918
- Shirley Trites. "Reading Hands: The Halifax School for the Blind". 2003
- Nova Scotia Archives, Halifax School for the Blind fonds (Contains Halifax Explosion 1917 eye injury records)
