= Halifax School for the Deaf =

Institution in Nova Scotia, Canada

Coordinates: 44.656014°N 63.589110°W

The Halifax School for the Deaf (The Deaf and Dumb Institution, Halifax) was an institution in Halifax, Nova Scotia, Canada, which opened on 4 August 1856. It was the first school of the deaf in Atlantic Canada. (The Halifax School for the Blind was opened on Morris Street in 1871.) There was later a dispute over who the true founder was, William Gray (1806–1881), a deaf Scottish immigrant who was the first teacher in the back room of a house in Argyle Street, or George Tait (1828–1904), another deaf Scot, who claimed to have been the driving force behind the establishment of the school. Gray was sacked in 1870 for being intoxicated and for threatening pupils with violence.

The first principal of the school was James Scott Hutton, who remained with the school 34 years. William Cunard (son of Sir Samuel Cunard) eventually built a school, which was completed in 1896 and was attended by 90 students.

Following the Halifax Explosion, the main building was temporarily closed for repairs. Half of the students attended classes on the campus of Acadia College in Wolfville, while others remained without education until the classes were relocated back to Halifax.

The school closed in June 1961.

A monument marks the location of the home, which was erected by the Eastern Canada Association of the Deaf.

== Gallery ==
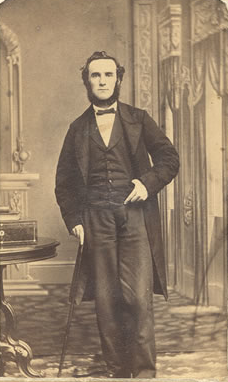
James Scott Hutton, first principal of the Halifax School for the Deaf

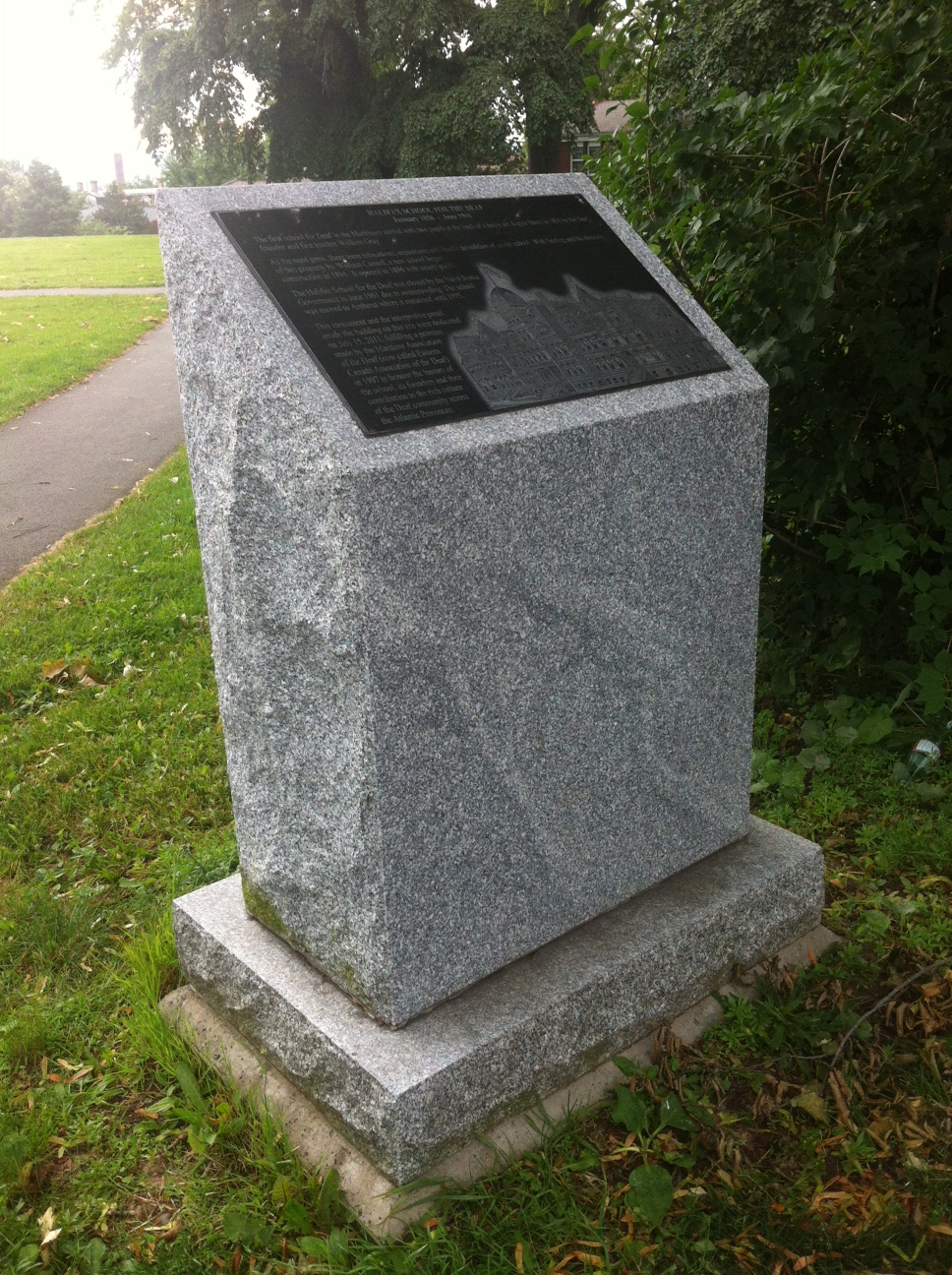
Monument Halifax School for the Deaf, Göttingen St., Halifax, Nova Scotia

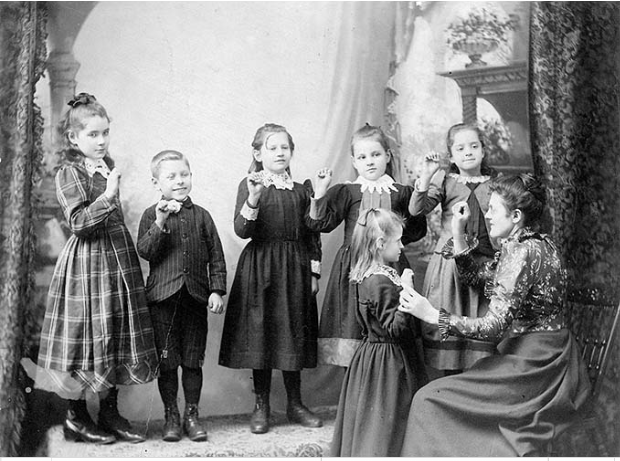
Students of Halifax School For Deaf

== See also ==
- History of Nova Scotia
- History of Halifax, Nova Scotia
- Alexander Graham Bell
- James Cuppaidge Cochran
