= Nova Scotia Magazine and Comprehensive Review of Literature, Politics, and News =

Nova Scotian magazine

Nova Scotia Magazine and Comprehensive Review of Literature, Politics, and News was Canada's first English-language magazine. It was published in Halifax, Nova Scotia from July 1789 to March 1792 by John Howe. It contained many articles from American, British and Irish publications, as well as local news. It was initially an eighty-page monthly periodical with over 200 subscribers, but despite reductions in price (Note: A poem published in the magazine, and about the magazine, tells us that an annual subscription cost 22shillings and 6pence.) and size it was not profitable. In its first year it was edited by William Cochran, headmaster of the Halifax Grammar School, but who resigned following his appointment as president of King's College, Windsor and Howe took over as editor in July 1790.

Cochran's intent was to create a publication that would compare favourably with anything currently available from America or Great Britain. He hoped to create a taste for British literature and encourage young writers. In addition he sought articles about natural history, topography and agriculture. A subscription list showed that the readership was mainly from the professional classes; politicians, lawyers, clergy, military leaders, and a few merchants. The largest number were from Halifax, but others were spread across Nova Scotia and a few in New Brunswick, Prince Edward Island and the then colony of Cape Breton Island.

== See also ==
- Literature of Nova Scotia
