= Charles Frederick Fraser =

First superintendent of the Halifax School for the Blind

Sir Charles Frederick Fraser
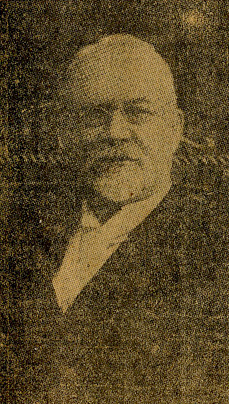
- Sir Frederick Fraser in Evening Mall, Toronto 1818
- Born: 4 January 1850; Windsor, Nova Scotia
- Died: 5 July 1925 (aged 75); Halifax, Nova Scotia
- Occupations: Educator, editor, businessman
- Notable credit: Established the Halifax School for the Blind in 1871
- Title: Sir
- Relatives: James Fraser (grandfather)

Sir Charles Frederick Fraser (born 4 January 1850 in Windsor, Nova Scotia – d. 5 July 1925 in Halifax, Nova Scotia) was the first superintendent (1873-1923) of the Halifax School for the Blind, the first residential school for the blind in Atlantic Canada. He became blind through an accident at age 7 and then went to study at Perkins School for the Blind in Boston. He was a member of the North British Society. He was knighted in 1915.

== Blindness ==
When Fraser was 7 years old, he was whittling a stick with a pocket knife. It slipped and hit his eye. Neither his physician father nor the Boston specialist he consulted was able to repair the damage. Although he attended primary school in Windsor, his eyesight deteriorated steadily, and the sight in his other eye also worsened. At the age of 13, when an operation to create an artificial pupil failed, Fraser was enrolled in the Perkins Institution and Massachusetts Asylum for the Blind in Boston, the first and most famous school for the blind in the United States. By the time he left in 1872 he was completely blind.

== Legacy ==
- Sir Frederick Fraser School
