= James Scott Hutton =

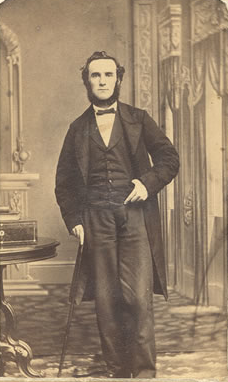
James Scott Hutton, first principal of the Halifax School for the Deaf

James Scott Hutton was the first principal of the Halifax School for the Deaf, and remained with the school for 34 years until his death in 1891. The Halifax School for the Deaf was the first school of the deaf in Atlantic Canada (1856). Along with teaching sign language, Hutton followed the lead of fellow Nova Scotian and advocate for the deaf Alexander Graham Bell by integrating lip-reading into the curriculum. From 1878 to 1882 he served as principal of a similar institution in Belfast (Northern Ireland).

== See also ==
- Halifax School for the Deaf

== Publications ==
- History of Halifax School for the Deaf
- J. Scott Hutton. Outlines of History and Biography. 1875
- J. Scott Hutton. Geography of Nova Scotia. 1869.
- J. Scott Hutton, "Deaf-Mute Education in the British Maritime Provinces," American Annals of the Deaf, Volume 14 (Raleigh, N. C.: Press of the Institution for the Deaf and Dumb and the Blind), pg 65-82.
- George Hutton - Scott's father, part 1
- George Hutton - Scott's father, part 2
- George Hutton, "Practicability and Advantages of Writing and Printing Natural Signs," American Annals of the Deaf, Volume 14 (Raleigh, N. C.: Press of the Institution for the Deaf and Dumb and the Blind), pg 157.
- J. Scott Hutton, Language Lessons for the Deaf and Dumb (Halifax, N. S.: The Pupils at the Institution Press, 1878).
