= The Masked Rider: Cycling in West Africa =

1996 book by Neil Peart

- First edition
- Author: Neil Peart
- Language: English
- Genre: Non-fiction, memoir
- Publisher: Pottersfield Press
- Publication date: 1996
- Publication place: Canada
- Media type: Print
- ISBN: 1-5502-2667-3
- Followed by: Ghost Rider: Travels on the Healing Road

The Masked Rider: Cycling in West Africa is a 1996 non-fiction book written by Rush drummer Neil Peart about a month-long bicycle tour he took through Cameroon in 1988.

== Synopsis ==
In November 1988, Peart joined David Mozer's Bicycle Africa for a month-long tour of Cameroon. Along with David, Neil would travel with three other strangers: Leonard, an African-American electrical engineer who is also a Vietnam War veteran; Elsa, a slender 60-year-old pacifist who would struggle to keep up with everyone and complain about everything; and Annie, a 30-something oft-scatterbrained administrative assistant.

Peart, an avid reader, brought two books on the trip with him, Nicomachean Ethics by Aristotle and Dear Theo by Vincent van Gogh, to read at rest stops and before bedtime. He would entwine thoughts about these two books throughout The Masked Rider.

=== Southern tour ===
They all met in Douala, where they would first travel west along the coast of the Atlantic Ocean and then turn north to the heart of the former British Cameroon, stopping at many towns in Southern Cameroon along the way, like Tiko, Buea, Limbe, Kumba, Nkongsamba, Bafang, Bafoussam, Mbouda, Bamenda, Bafut, Ndop, Kumbo, Jakiri, and Foumban.

As they travel, Elsa starts complaining and is so tired after a few days she contemplates quitting, but it was David who encouraged her to keep going. Neil and the others also experience many things about each town; how nice some are (Bamenda) and how not so nice the others are (Kumba). Peart called Kumba "a real hell hole." They also meet a Peace Corps volunteer named Kim in Jakiri who cooked them all hamburgers.

=== Buses and trains ===
After the Southern tour is over, all five of them are crammed into a bus in Foumban to go to Yaoundé, where they spend two days enjoying the street food and Neil got to make a call home to his wife before boarding a train to Ngaoundéré. Once there, they board another bus for Garoua. However, this bus would have problems, starting with the bus driver allowing both of one set of dual tires to blow out, and managing to obtain another tire to fix it all before continuing on (as there was only one spare tire, which was useless when two tires are blown out). Eventually, about 30 miles from Garoua, the bus's engine would give out, and they decide to start cycling again from there.

=== Northern tour ===
From before Garoua, the gang starts cycling again to towns and villages in the north. After Garoua, it would be Hama Koussou, Dembo, Tchevi, Roumsiki, Guave, Mabas, Tourou, Mozogo, Mora, Waza, Ndiguina, Maltam, Kousséri, and finally, to N'Djamena, Chad.

During this time, Neil would get nervous while being accosted by a very, very drunk Cameroon soldier in Dembo, he and Leonard would almost wind up in Nigeria, they would enjoy looking at wildlife in a game park, Campement de Waza, while enjoying a bit of luxury, and finally continuing onto N'Djamena, where they would have further adventures concluding the trip.

First, they had to obtain exit visas to leave Cameroon, then they would be told they would need one to leave Chad, which they were afraid they could not get in time for the one flight per week. Peart would get so ill the night before worrying about all this, he could not face dinner, but the next morning was much better, and they all managed to leave the country and conclude the tour. Neil, Leonard, and Elsa would fly UTA to Paris, while David and Annie would fly Air Afrique to Mali.

At the end, Neil would spend a week with his then-wife, Jackie, in Paris.

== Printings ==
Originally published in 1996 by Pottersfield Press, a small publishing company based in Nova Scotia, The Masked Rider was only available in Canadian bookstores, on Amazon.com, and at souvenir stands at Rush concerts. However, subsequent books by Peart were published by ECW Press, which actually had an international distributor; thus those books garnered more sales, and in 2004, ECW bought the publishing rights for The Masked Rider and released a second edition.

When the second edition of The Masked Rider came out, there were numerous mistakes that were not seen by Peart until after the book went on sale at a concert in Milwaukee. For instance, all of the pictures were missing, the original map of Cameroon was there, and not a more updated version, along with at least one glaring grammatical error (involving an exact quote from an African native, which was in pidgin English, but was written in the book in proper English). By the time the book was pulled from the shelves in Milwaukee, 26 copies of that book were sold. Peart then offered, on Rush's website, to replace those copies with a signed hardcover copy of the correct version. Two people took Peart up on the offer, leaving only 24 copies of the book in circulation.
