= William Cochran (priest) =

Nova Scotian Anglican priest

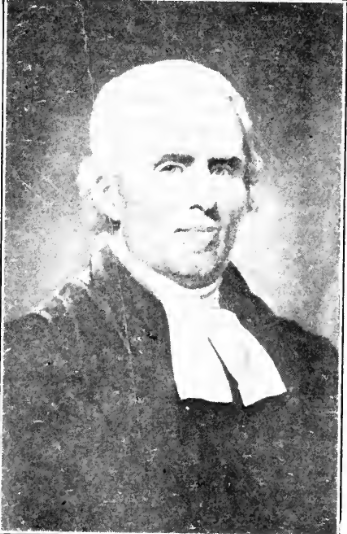
Cochran

William Cochran (1757–1833) was an Anglican priest who served as the president of King's College in Windsor, Nova Scotia, for more than 40 years. Cochran entered Trinity College, Dublin, in June 1776, and despite a “low conception of his own capacity” he was elected a scholar in 1779 and took his degree in 1780. He served first as principal of the Halifax Grammar School before becoming president of Kings College. He was also the editor of Nova Scotia Magazine and Comprehensive Review of Literature, Politics, and News, and was awarded an honorary A.M. by Columbia College in New York City in 1788.

There is a marble mural tablet in the old Parish Church in Windsor, placed in his memory by his pupils. It read "Sacred to the memory of the Rev. William Cochran, D. D., Professor of Languages and of Moral Science, and Vice-President of King's College, etc., etc."

The Rev. W. Cochran was appointed to take charge of King's College in May, 1790. In May, 1802, the Charter was granted, and the governors failing to induce a graduate of Oxford to take the office of President under the Charter, the Rev. W. Cochran was appointed Vice-President in 1803. Under his management the University continued until the Rev. Thos. Cox, D. D., assumed the presidency in the autumn of 1804.

Dr. Cochran was not only Vice-President of King's College, but he was the S. P. G. missionary at Newport, and in 1809 he had also charge of Falmouth and Rawdon. Up to this period he had to read his lectures in Latin in the College. In 1814 he was appointed to Falmouth alone. This appointment he held in addition to his duties at the College. He resigned the vice-presidency in 1831, and died in 1833, at the age of 77, having been a missionary and a professor for more than forty years.

He is buried in the Old Parish Burying Ground in Windsor. His son was James Cuppaidge Cochran. (Chief Justice of Gibraltar)
