= Sober Island, Nova Scotia =

Island in Nova Scotia, Canada

Coordinates: 44°50′32.06″N 62°27′48.44″W

Sober Island in Nova Scotia

Sober Island is a rural community on the Eastern Shore of Nova Scotia, Canada, in the Halifax Regional Municipality. The community is situated on Sober Island. Sober Island Pond is located in the middle of the island. The community is about 14 km (8.7 mi) south of Sheet Harbour. It is connected to the mainland by Sober Island Road. There are no numbered highways on Sober Island.

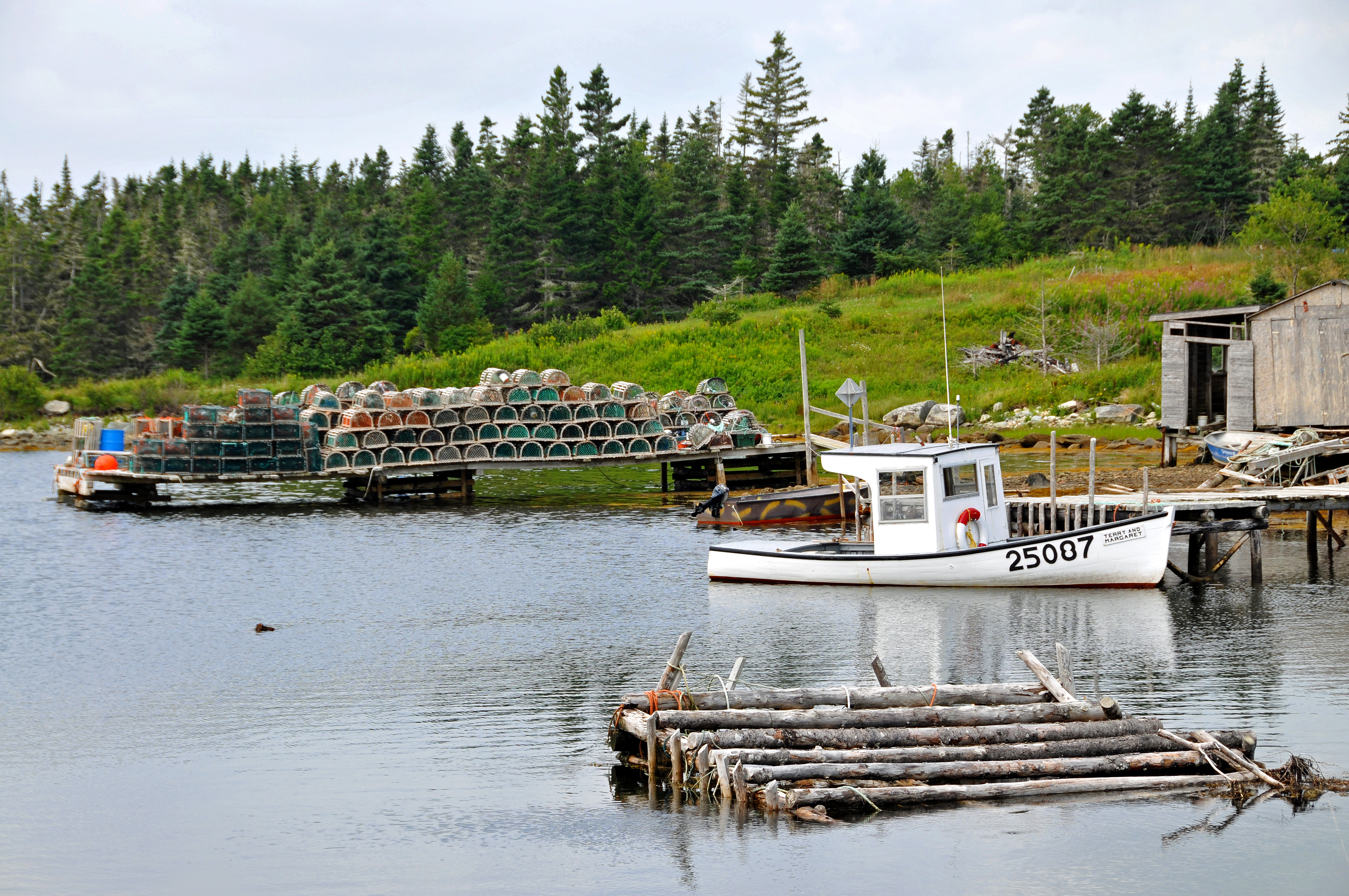
Harbour of Sober Island
