= Lesley Choyce =

Canadian writer and publisher

- Born: Lesley Willis Choyce; 21 March 1951 (age 75); Riverside, New Jersey, United States
- Citizenship: Canadian
- Education: Rutgers University (BA); Montclair State College (MA); City University of New York (MA)
- Occupations: Writer; publisher; educator
- Writing career
- Genres: Fiction; non-fiction; children's literature; young adult literature
- Notable work: The Republic of Nothing (1994)
- Notable awards: Award of Merit, Order of Saint John (1986)
- Website: www.lesleychoyce.com

Lesley Choyce (born 21 March 1951) is a Canadian writer, publisher, and educator based in Nova Scotia. Born in Riverside, New Jersey, he moved to Lawrencetown Beach in 1978. After moving to Nova Scotia, Choyce established the publishing company Pottersfield Press. He has written an extensive body of literature consisting of novels, non-fiction, children's literature, young adult novels, and poetry.

== Early life and education ==
Lesley Willis Choyce was born on 21 March 1951 in Riverside, New Jersey, to parents George and Norma Choyce. After graduating from high school in 1969, he began participating in protests against the Vietnam War. He marched in demonstrations in New York and Washington, D.C., and participated in a protest at Fort Bragg led by Jane Fonda.

Choyce graduated from Rutgers University with a Bachelor of Arts in 1972, followed by a Master of Arts in American literature from Montclair State College in 1974, and finally a Master of Arts in English literature from the City University of New York in 1983. Choyce's early career in the United States included roles such as rehabilitation counsellor and writing program coordinator. He moved to Lawrencetown Beach, Nova Scotia, in 1978.

== Career ==
After moving to Nova Scotia, Choyce founded the publishing company Pottersfield Press in 1979, primarily publishing books of regional interest to Atlantic Canada. Through Pottersfield Press, Choyce has published a large volume of literature from various authors, many of whom were first-time writers introduced by Choyce. In 1980, he released his first book of poetry, Reinventing the Wheel, followed by the short story collection Eastern Sure in 1981. He began teaching at Dalhousie University in 1981, first as an instructor and later as a professor of English.

Pottersfield Press was substantially funded by provincial and federal arts programs, however the publisher was less affected by the changes in funding policy of the mid-1990s due to Choyce's varied sources of income; while running Pottersfield Press, he was also working as a radio and television presenter, publishing his own books through other publishers, and teaching at Dalhousie University. While employed at Dalhousie, Choyce interacted with the Mi'kmaq communities of the province through his role teaching the Dalhousie University Transition Year Program. These interactions lead to the creation of The Mi'kmaq Anthology, which Choyce co-edited with Rita Joe.

As a writer, Choyce is the author of over 100 books across genres, including fiction, non-fiction, children's literature, and poetry. 40 of his books were written between 1977 and 1997. His young adult novels, such as Skateboard Shakedown (1989), Wave Watch (1990), Roid Rage (1999), and Smoke and Mirrors (2004) often explore themes of sports, nature, and peer pressure, appealing to reluctant readers with engaging plots and an accessible vocabulary. Amongst his literature for adult readers, The Republic of Nothing (1994) stands out as one of Choyce's most well-received novels, having remained in print and being optioned for film. The novel was the winner of the Dartmouth Book Award for Fiction at the Atlantic Book Awards in 1995. Choyce's writing typically reflects his own experiences and personal interests such as surfing and environmentalism.

Choyce hosted the national television talk show Choyce Words beginning in 1985, as well as Off The Page. He was the founding member of the 1990s spoken word rock band The SurfPoets, which produced two albums. His books have been translated into Spanish, French, German, and Danish.

== Personal life ==
Choyce is an avid surfer, and has been known to surf year-round, including in the wintertime. In 2004, he participated in a demonstration protesting against the Iraq War called "Paddling for Peace" at Lawrencetown Beach, days before President George W. Bush was due to arrive in Halifax during his first official visit to Canada since he became elected. Choyce reportedly wanted to present Bush with a customized surfboard with the words "Waves, Not War" written on it.

== Recognition ==
- Award of Merit, Order of Saint John (1986)
- Dartmouth Book Award (1990, 1995)
- Ann Connor Brimer Award for Children's Literature (1994, 2003)
- Authors Award, Foundation for the Advancement of Canadian Letters (1995)
- First Place Award, Canadian Surfing Championships (1995)
- Landmark East Literacy Award (2000)
- Poet laureate, Peter Gzowski Invitational Golf Tournament (2000)

== See also ==
- List of writers from Nova Scotia
