= Pottersfield Press =

Canadian publishing company

- Logo of Pottersfield Press
- Founded: 1979; 47 years ago
- Founder: Lesley Choyce
- Country of origin: Canada
- Headquarters location: Lawrencetown Beach, Nova Scotia
- Publication types: Books
- Official website: www.pottersfieldpress.com

Pottersfield Press is a Canadian book publishing company founded in 1979 by Lesley Choyce. Pottersfield primarily focuses on publishing books of regional interest for Atlantic Canada, and is based in Lawrencetown Beach, Nova Scotia.

== History ==
Pottersfield Press was founded in 1979 by Lesley Choyce, and is based in Lawrencetown Beach, Nova Scotia. Pottersfield originates from a literary magazine edited by Choyce called the Pottersfield Portfolio.

In 1986, Pottersfield expressed interest in publishing poetry written by the Canadian Prime Minister Brian Mulroney, following an official visit from Japanese Prime Minister Yasuhiro Nakasone in which Nakasone presented a book of his own poetry to Mulroney. In response to the gift, Mulroney was reported to have replied "I'd give you a book of my poetry but nobody would be willing to publish it." Choyce believed that Mulroney would be a successful poet based on his observations watching Mulroney on television.

Pottersfield published their first poetry audiocassettes in 1995, with one featuring Maxine Tynes reading her collection Borrowed Beauty, and another with George Elliott Clarke reading Lush Dreams, Blue Exile.

Pottersfield conveys a literary award known as the Pottersfield Prize for Creative Non-fiction. The company publishes fiction, non-fiction, poetry, and other books of regional interest to Atlantic Canada. In particular, Pottersfield has a focus on publishing works related to Mi'kmaq and Black Nova Scotians.

== Notable publications ==
- Peart, Neil (1996). The Masked Rider: Cycling in West Africa.

== See also ==
- Literature of Nova Scotia
- List of writers from Nova Scotia
