= Devils Battery =

Coordinates: 44.595°N 63.452°W

Devils Battery or Devils Point Battery, Hartlen Point or Hartlen Point Tunnels, was a complex military installation at the mouth of Halifax Harbour in the community of Eastern Passage at Hartlen Point, Canada. It was built between 1940 and 1945 to protect the Halifax area against the German navy. It was operational until the 1950s. The site had three 9.2 inch (234 mm) breech-loading Mark X guns, operated by the 53rd Heavy Battery of the 1st (Halifax) Coast Regiment. It is now a golf course; the original underground armaments remain buried. Devils Battery was named for Devils Island which is adjacent to the embankment of Hartlen's Point.

== Construction ==
On September 10, 1939, Prime Minister William Lyon Mackenzie King and the Parliament of Canada declared war against Nazi Germany.

The federal government relocated the fishermen of Devils Island to the mainland of Eastern Passage. However the lighthouse keeper remained.

=== Archetype ===
The progressive development for this military structure was supplied by Britain to the Royal Canadian Engineers. While "Spion Kop" battery near Ferguson's Cove, Nova Scotia was taken out of operation, York Redoubt, Fort McNab, Chebucto Head, Strawberry and Connaught Battery were quickly upgraded and rearmed, unlike Devils Battery, which was built from scratch and made one of the largest coastal defences on the Atlantic seaboard. Many or all of these eastern batteries were contracted to private firms; Devils Battery was subcontracted to the Toronto firm of Angus Robertson. It was the last time that such building was outsourced to the private sector. Aside from the hired draughtsmen, mechanics and journeymen, much of the labour needed was undertaken by people in the "Passage". These local residents had a reputation of being hired for Department of National Defence developmental structures and posts. "A-23" Elkins Barracks was another home defence project for soldiers in training and also used as a dormitory, less than 3 km (2 miles) away.

=== Fortress ===
After July 17, 1940, military road patrols were deployed near familiar harbour viewpoints to keep Sunday drivers away from any forts. Hartlens Point was long-time military property, and an additional 285 acres (115 hectares) was purchased: a community of houses was expropriated when the battery was installed. This removed the inhabitants from danger in the event of action. To minimize the target and disguise its existence, Devils Battery was buried below ground. The lowest level contained heating and air circulation, the second level was for plotting rooms and the top underground level below the guns had the quarters, chart rooms, telephones and magazine storage. All components were connected by insulated sound-proof tunnels converging on the command post. The magazines were isolated from the rest of the complex. Devils Battery generated its own power in a separate underground facility with a large hydraulic system. The underground diesel flywheel is the size of a two-storey house. It took two engines to turn it over.

== Gate House ==
The sloping hillside embankment along the shore exposes the structured reinforced guard post. Isolated from the rest of the fort, it is annexed to an ample concrete wall that holds the main entrance, distantly leading into the underground plotting room and three covered walking channels that proceed to the network of under surface interconnections.

== Flandrum Hill and Osborne Head ==
The two highest land elevations surveyed for Devils Battery observation posts were Flandrum Hill, Cow Bay and Caldwell Road between "A-23" barracks and "Radio 16" aircraft direction radar (Scott Drive). Each elevated point had a four-storey reinforced concrete Victoria Fortress Observation Post, with plotting rooms and telephones connected to the Halifax fire command post. Two other three-storey observation posts were erected, one at the new radar installation at Osborne Head, and the other above the hill behind the three turrets. Each look-out was staffed by a crew of two on the top storey using a Depression position finder looking out towards the harbour for any suspicious targets.

== Deception ==
Devils Battery would not appear to an enemy U-boat, E-boat or aircraft to be a defence emplacement. The complex was made out to be a farm: the three emplacement turrets holding the guns were masked as farm houses, the observation post behind the site had the appearance of a church. 750 metres (800 yards) east, near the Osborne Head radar station, a dummy battery was installed with props.

== Early problems ==
Early manoeuvres during the winter months, running the fort and executing the 9.2 inch guns were a problem. Installed by cranes during construction, one of the 28-ton guns accidentally broke away from its lashed cables and smashed through the vast concrete apron that had been poured over frozen ground, sinking three metres (nine feet) into the thawed earth. Leaks in the subsurface were a nuisance, the complexity of the hydraulic system design had flaws and mechanical failures under the earth‘s surface would occur. Although the hydraulic fluid was a cheap economy brand, when time came to charge the system and fire the guns off for a crowd of engineers and invited dignitaries, many of the welds failed and 6800 litres (1500 gallons) of crude hydraulic oil flooded & drenched the interior of the battery.

Carefully crafted and fine machined fittings were prefabricated in England to precise specifications, however they could not be made to fit as were expected to.
