= Eastern Passage, Nova Scotia =

Eastern Passage
- Community
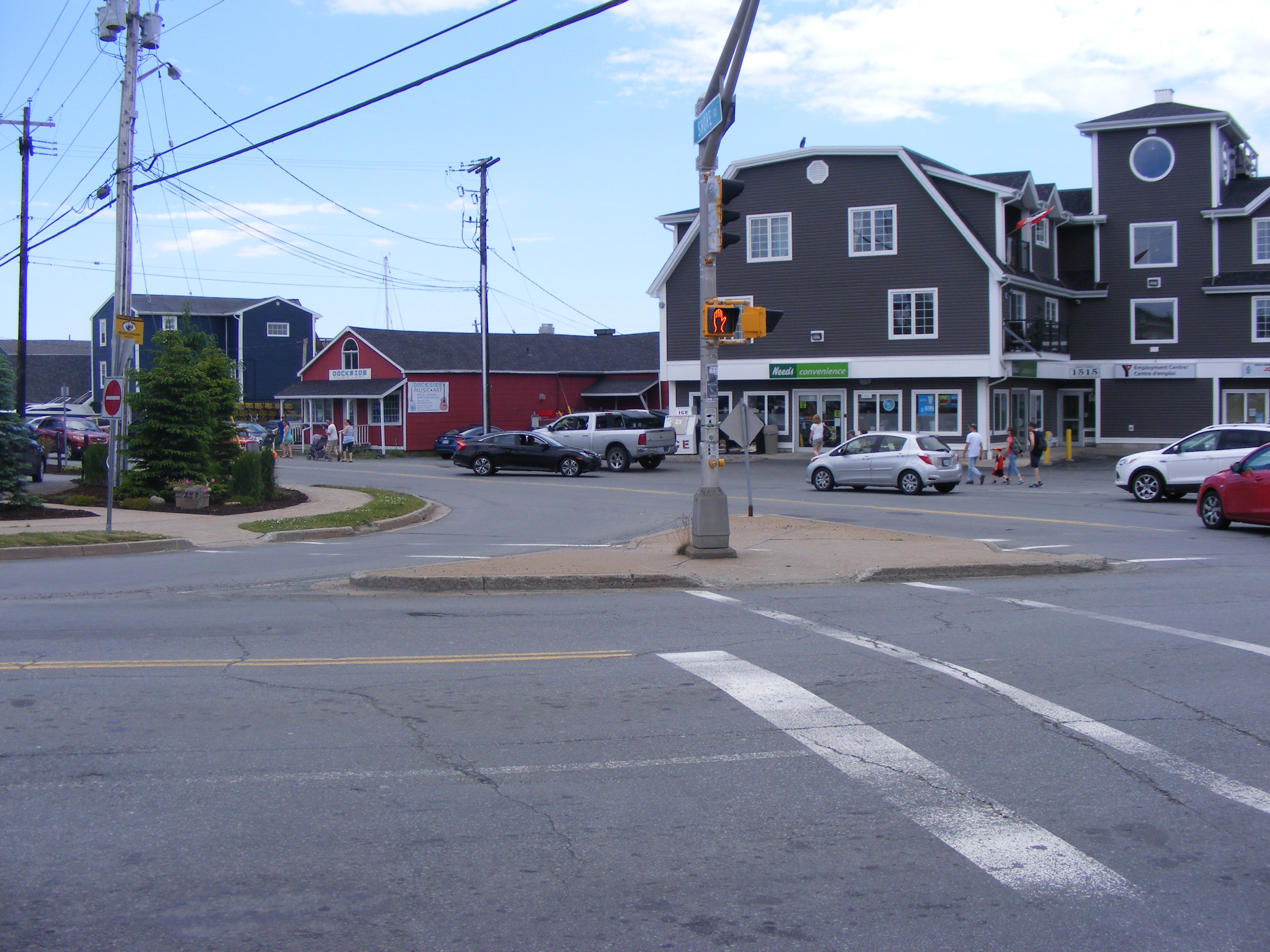
- The town centre of Eastern Passage (1 July 2016)

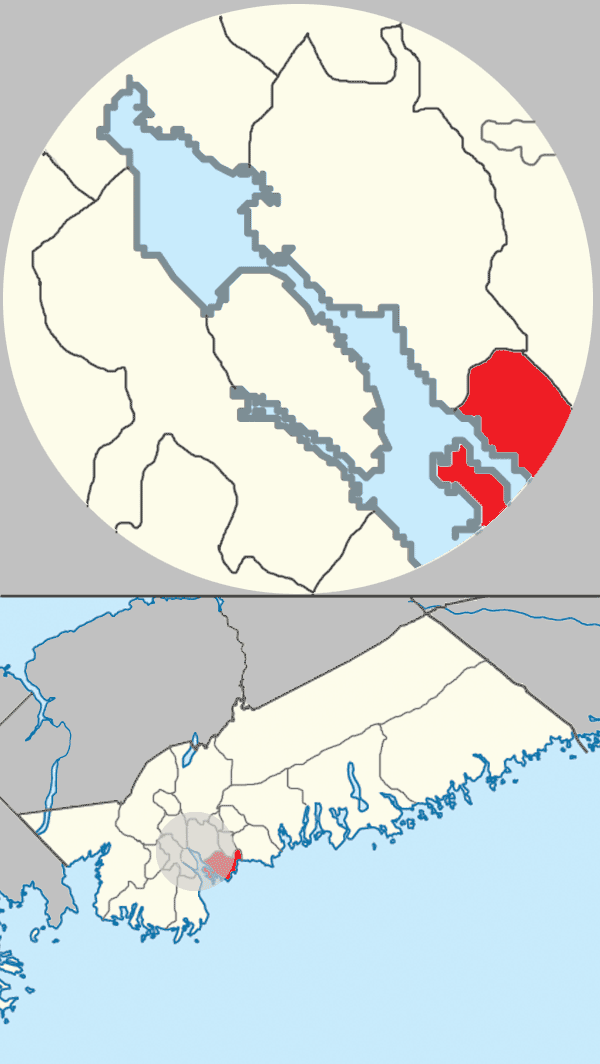
- Cow Bay & Eastern Passage planning area of municipal Halifax.
- Coordinates: 44.611656°N 63.494098°W
- Country: Canada
- Province: Nova Scotia
- Municipality: Halifax Regional Municipality
- District: 3 - Dartmouth South - Eastern Passage
- Founded: circa 1798

Government
  - Type: Regional Council
  - Governing Council: Halifax Regional Council
  - Community Council: Harbour East - Marine Drive Community Council

Area
  - Total: 13.72 km^{2} (5.30 sq mi)
- Elevation: 0–36 m (0–118 ft)

Population (2011)
  - Total: 11,738
  - Density: 855/km^{2} (2,210/sq mi)
- Time zone: UTC-4 (AST)
  - Summer (DST): UTC-3 (ADT)
- Canadian Postal code: B3G
- Area code: 902
- GNBC Code: CAKQU
- Website: easternpassage.ca

Eastern Passage is an unincorporated suburban community in Halifax Regional Municipality Nova Scotia, Canada.

Eastern Passage has historically been tied to the fishing industry. Its waterfront has several small wharves and piers. The construction of CFB Shearwater, a military air base, at the northern boundary of the community during World War I, and the construction of the Imperial Oil (later Esso), Texaco (later Ultramar) oil refineries, the Volvo Halifax Assembly plant and automobile import/export facility following World War II redefined the local economy. New highway connections have resulted in the majority of area residents commuting to Downtown Halifax or Dartmouth.

== History ==
Prior to the European settlers, Eastern Passage was a season home to the Mi'kmaq for thousands of years. Europeans began seasonal use of the channel starting about 1712 while the Mi'kmaq shifted to McNab's island. The Eastern Passage area was granted to ranger Joseph Gorham, but he did not settle the passage and the land was regranted in 1798 to Jacob Horn, the first recorded settler who was soon followed by other families. The first European settlers who moved there were mainly German, French, Irish and English. These ethnic groups continue to make up a large portion of the population of Eastern Passage.

Fort Clarence (formerly the Eastern Battery), a large gun battery was constructed beside Eastern Passage in 1754 at the beginning of the French and Indian War. Built to defend the harbour, the battery provided a cross fire with batteries on Georges Island and McNabs Island. In the late 1790s a Martello Tower was built at each of the three sites.

During the American Civil War, The iron Confederate naval cruiser Tallahassee sailed into Halifax Harbour on August 18, 1864, to take on bunker coal and water and then used the Eastern Passage channel to escape, for it was believed that Union naval forces were waiting at the main harbour entrance.

An American naval air station was constructed at Eastern Passage during World War I to patrol against German submarines. It was taken over by the Royal Canadian Air Force in the 1920s and became a large air base during World War II.

In the 1920s and 1930s, a number of Eastern Passage residents from the Hartlan and Henneberry families proved important sources of Canadian folk songs and stories to Nova Scotia folklorist Helen Creighton.

During the second world war Hartlen's Point was bought out in order to build a military complex at the mouth of the harbor. This complex was called the Devil's Battery and is located underground.

Serious reductions to the CFB Shearwater base in the 1990s and the shutdown of the Ultramar Refinery challenged the economy of Eastern Passage in the 1990s. One response was the redevelopment of the small craft harbor, long known as "the Crick" or "the cove" but rechristened in 1996 as "Fisherman's Cove", a tourist attraction which combines a working fishing harbour with gift shops and restaurants.

In 1996 Fisherman's Cove opened as a tourist attraction. The attraction had things such as shops and restaurants.

In the summer of 2003, the fourth season of Trailer Park Boys was filmed in Eastern Passage. It was the last season of the show filmed in a privately held park.

== Geography ==
Located at the southeastern edge of Halifax Harbour, fronting the Atlantic Ocean, Eastern Passage derives its name from the narrow strait separating the mainland from Lawlor Island and McNabs Island, both of which lie several hundred metres west of the community. This "Eastern Passage" into the harbour is not the main shipping channel due to its shallow depths; the main shipping channel lies west of McNabs Island. The Eastern Passage is largely used by small recreational boats and fishing vessels during inclement weather as the island affords shelter from prevailing winds.

The community is south--south-west of Cow Bay, and south-east of Shearwater, and has 1,372 hectares (13.72 km^{2}) of landmass.

== Demographics ==
Although there is not any recent information that regards population from the 2016 census, or 2021 census, there is information from the 2011 census that records 11,738 people lived within the boundaries of Eastern Passage. In 2011, the population density of the community was 855 people per km^{2}.

== Public transportation ==
Eastern Passage is served by Halifax Transit routes 6B and 6C, which link the community to the Woodside Ferry Terminal as well as the Bridge Terminal in Dartmouth.
