= Ethel Adelaide Parker =

English concert organist and composer

- Born: 21 July 1886
- Died: 1 February 1971 (aged 84)
- Education: Royal College of Music
- Occupations: Organist and composer

Ethel Adelaide Parker (21 July 1886 – 1 February 1971) was an English concert organist and composer. Parker composed under a number of pseudonyms including Etelka d’Arba, Bruno d’Arba, Joan d’Arba and Joan McLeod.

== Education ==
Between 1905 and 1909 Parker studied at the Royal College of Music in London, and one of her tutors was Sir Walter Parratt. At a later date Parker continued her studies in Germany with Dr Karl Straube in Leipzig, and also the composer Max Reger.

== Musical career ==
As a concert organist Parker promoted English contemporary music in Europe, and was noted to be the first women organist to perform a solo in the celebrated Thomaskirche Saturday Motette series in Leipzig. In England Parker gave the first performance of Reger’s Fantasy and Fugue on Bach, which took place on 30 June 1910 at the Queen’s Hall in London. Parker is also credited with introducing the music of Sigfrid Karg-Elert to the British public, who composed specifically his In dulci jubilo Op 75 No 2 for Parker and dedicated it to her.

In the 1920s Parker became interested, through campanologist William Wooding Starmer, in carillon and bell music. It is believed that through the support of a Swiss millionaire, she continued her studies in performance under Antoon Nauwelaerts in Bruges. Around this time, she was known to travel Europe widely as a concert organist, often using the name Adelaide Parker.

As a composer, many leading publishers promoted the music of Parker including Novello & Co, J & W Chester, J. Curwen & Sons and Cramer Music. In writing music for the voice, she set texts by many poets including Christina Rossetti, W. B. Yeats, R. M. Rilke, as well as dedicating works to leading musicians including Elena Gerhardt and Maria Olenina-d'Alheim. Parker is often cited as being the first known women to have composed for the carillon, and letters survive between Parker and Percival Price concerning this area of interest.

== Works ==
The Royal College of Music houses an archive of manuscript and published scores by Parker.

Name of work	Instrumentation	Publisher
Cattistock	Carillon	
Images Bretonnes	Carillon	
Three Pieces	Carillon	
Suite sur un vieux chant Vendéen	Carillon	
Thème et Variations	Carillon	
Christmas in the forest	Choir	Cramer Music, 1950
Ave Maria	Choir	
Evening Hymn to The Holy Trinity	Choir	
Images Bretonnes	Choir	
Oh, what shall lift the night	Choir	
Tell me, my lamb of gold	Choir	
Variations sur un air de la rue au Moyen-Age	Harp	Editions Henn
Danceries	Harp	
Five Impressions	Harp	
Fantaisie fugue	Orchestra	
Variations sur un theme russe	Organ	J & W Chester
Fantaisie fugue	Organ	
Suite on the old London street-cry of the bellman	Organ	
Irrlichter	Organ	
Fugal Fantasy	Organ	
Thème et Variations in G minor	Piano	
Christmas eve	Soloists and choir	Cramer Music, 1957
Four graces from Herrick’s Noble Numbers	Soloists and boys choir	William Elkin & Co, 1948
Dainty rogues in porcelain (3 duets)	Soloists and piano	J & W Chester, 1929
Two Swedish Legends after Selma Lagerlöf (tone poems)	String orchestra	J & W Chester, 1958
Dream	String orchestra	
Why fadest thou in death	Voice and orchestra	
Four Songs	Voice and orchestra	
Frolleclaloon	Voice and piano	
A Fian lullaby	Voice and piano	J. Curwen & Sons, 1923
Russian lullaby	Voice and piano	J. Curwen & Sons, 1925
Clover	Voice and piano	J & W Chester, 1929
Laudate eum, elementa, Christus natus est	Voice and piano	Novello & Co, 1938
Carol	Voice and piano	J & W Chester, 1939
Two songs from Herrick’s Noble Numbers	Voice and piano	William Elkin & Co, 1954
Slumber Song	Voice and piano	William Elkin & Co, 1954
Wayfarers’ carol	Voice and piano	William Elkin & Co, 1957
December	Voice and piano	William Elkin & Co, 1957
Away with us he’s going	Voice and piano	
Cold	Voice and piano	
Ist ein Schloss	Voice and piano	
The Lamb-Child	Voice and piano	
Leuchtendes land	Voice and piano	
Märchen	Voice and piano	
The New-yeeres gift	Voice and piano	
The Rune	Voice and piano	
Slumber Song	Voice and piano	
Zauber	Voice and piano	
Wayfarers’ Carol	Voice and piano	
Les deux enfant de roi	Voice and piano	
