= Louis Welden Hawkins =

English-French painter (1849–1910

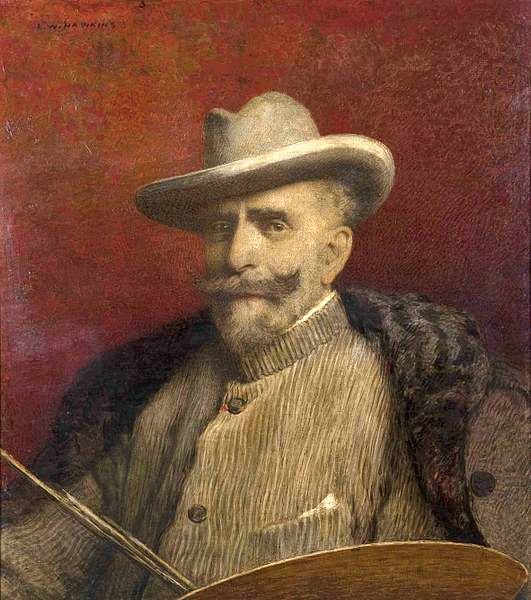
- Self-portrait with palette (1890)
- Born: July 1, 1849; Esslingen, Germany
- Died: May 1, 1910 (aged 60); Paris, France
- Education: Académie Julian; École des Beaux-Arts
- Known for: Painting
- Movement: Symbolism

Louis Welden Hawkins (1 July 1849 – 1 May 1910) was an English and naturalized-French painter of the fin-de-siècle period . He was a member of the Symbolist movement and is best known for his pensive, dreamlike female portraits.

He moved in the leading Symbolist circles of the late 19th century, counting Stéphane Mallarmé, Robert de Montesquiou, and Auguste Rodin among his associates. His art was also influenced by the Pre-Raphaelite Brotherhood.

== Life ==
He was born in Esslingen in the Kingdom of Württemberg, then part of the German Confederation, on 1 July 1849. His father, William Hawkins, was a British naval officer, and his mother, Louise Von Welden, an Austrian baroness. Though destined for a military career, he broke with his family in 1873 and moved to France, eventually becoming a naturalized French citizen in 1895.

After settling in Paris, he studied under William-Adolphe Bouguereau, Jules Joseph Lefebvre, and Gustave Boulanger at the Académie Julian in Paris from 1873 to 1876, and went on to attend the École des Beaux-Arts in 1876. Hawkins rose to fame after exhibiting a portrait of Sarah Bernhardt at the Salon de la Société des Artistes Francais in 1878. He continued showing works at the Salon from 1880 to 1891. He received and declined state commissions.

Hawkins gravitated toward Symbolist circles and exhibited paintings at the Salon de la Société des Beaux-Arts (1894–1911), the Salon de la Rose + Croix (1894–95), and La Libre Esthétique in Brussels. He cultivated close friendships with leading figures of the movement, including Jean Lorrain, Paul Adam, Laurent Tailhade, Robert de Montesquiou, and Stéphane Mallarmé, who welcomed him into their celebrated gatherings on the rue de Rome.

He lived for a period with Camille Pelletan, a radical socialist politician, and he continued to move in radical circles. In his Portrait of Séverine (1895), he shows a popular journalist, Séverine, who was a famous defender of humanitarian causes. He was also friendly with artists such as James Abbott McNeill Whistler, Maria Olenina-d'Alheim, and Auguste Rodin, whose portraits he painted.

Between 1892 and 1897, he contributed writings to the Mercure de France under the pseudonym "Quazi," and in 1899 he published and illustrated a children's book, La Reine du jardin. In the 1900s he exhibited in London and collaborated with The Artist and Journal of Home Culture, while in Paris he contributed portrait drawings to L'Œuvre d'art international, a magazine run by his brother-in-law Francesco Zeppa.

He spent his last years in Brittany, where he painted mostly coastal landscapes around Perros-Guirec.

Hawkins died of a heart attack at his family home in the 17th arrondissement of Paris on 1 May, 1910, aged 60. He was honored a year later at the Salon Nationale.

== Style ==
After his education at the Académie Julian, Hawkins chose the path of Symbolism. Symbolism began as an artistic movement that developed from Romanticism in France in the second half of the 19th century, taking its themes of decadence, dandyism and mysticism. Symbolism was a reaction to Impressionism. Symbolist painting emphasized fantasy and imagination in their depiction of objects. Symbolist artists often used metaphors and symbols to suggest a subject and favored mystical themes.

His painting is characterized by a pensive gravity reminiscent of, and influenced by, the pre-Raphaelites. Hawkins became famous because of his fine and dreamy female portraits.

== Personal life ==
He married Raffaela Zeppa on 6 August 1896. The couple had a daughter, Jacqueline Hawkins, born 1 June 1892.

== Selected paintings ==
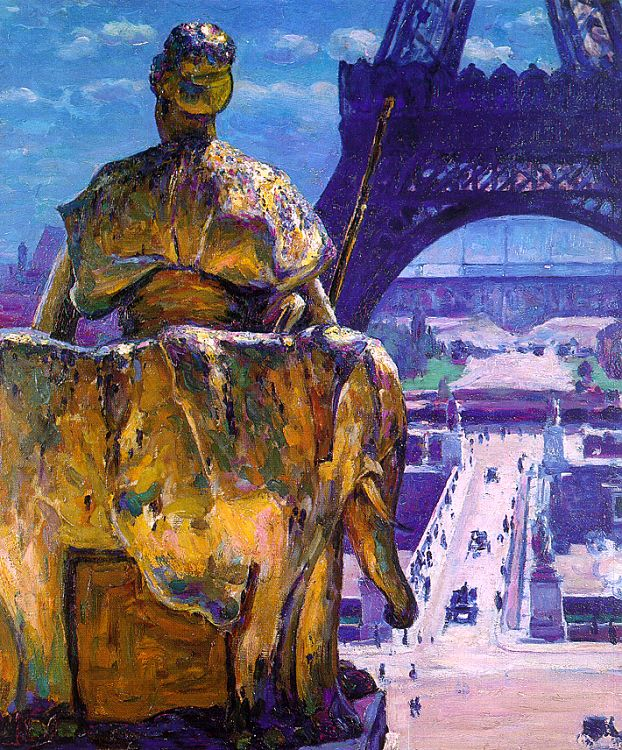
The Eiffel Tower seen from the Trocadéro

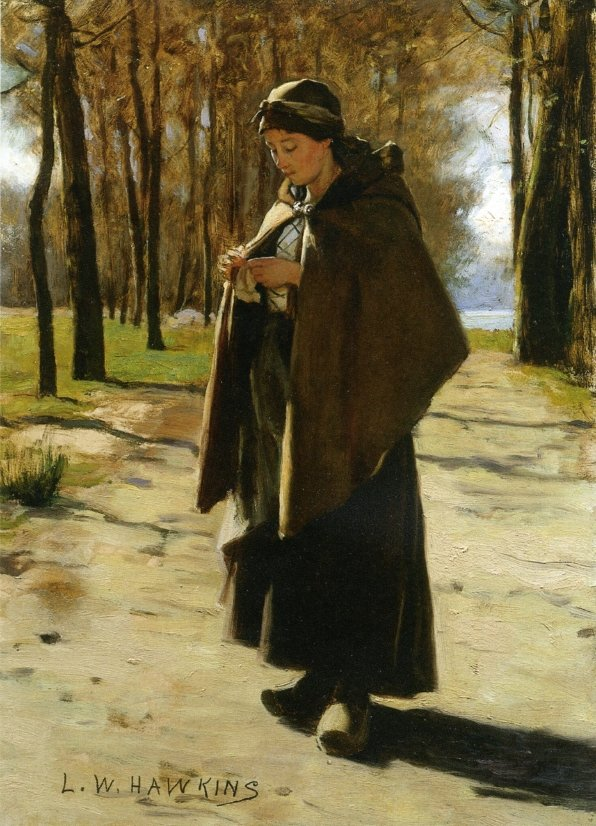
A Peasant (circa 1880)

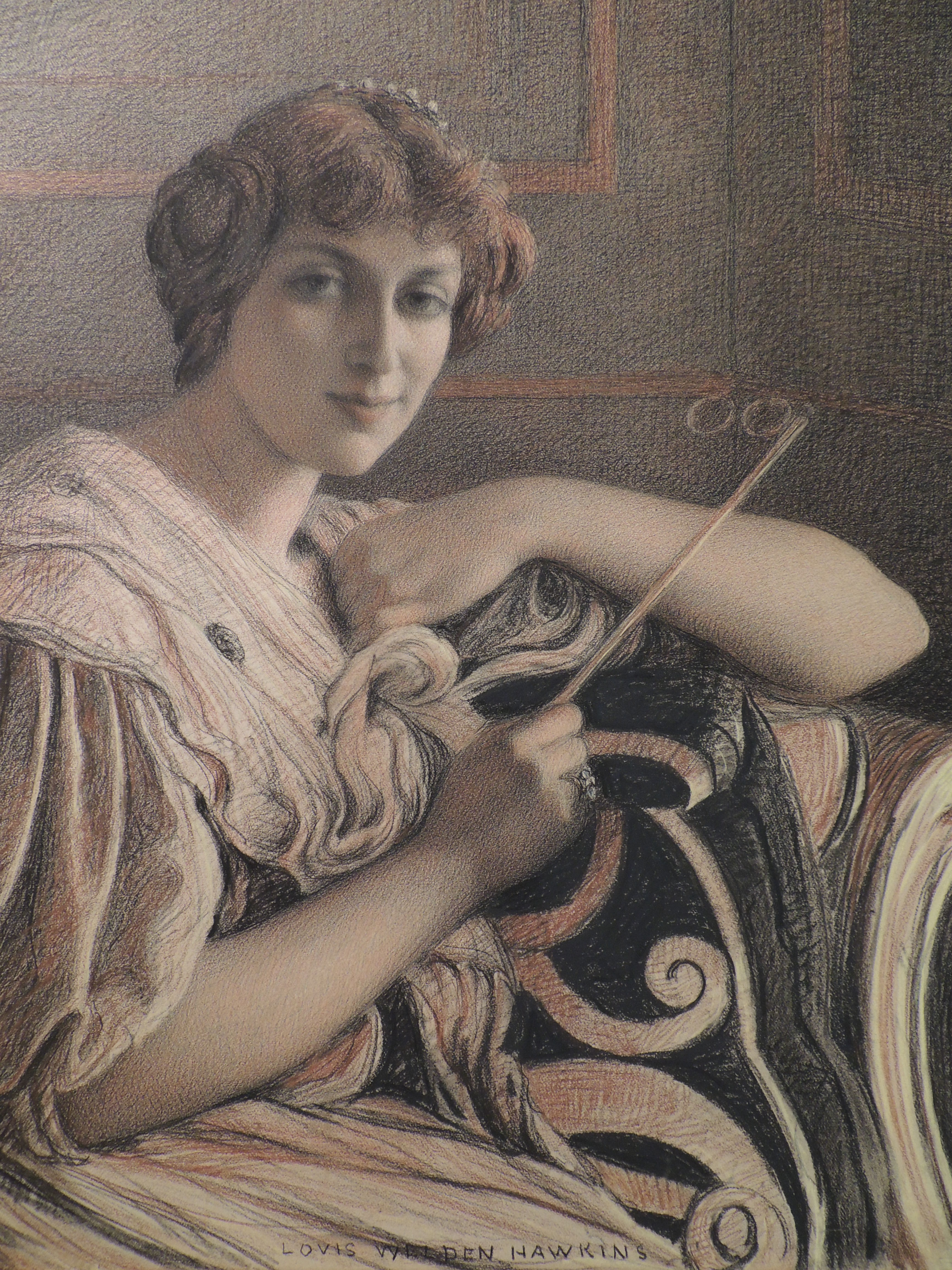
Portrait of a Woman

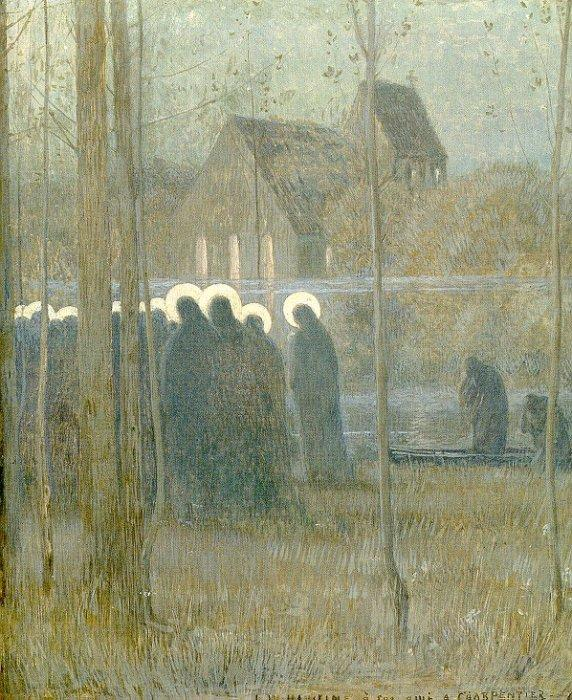
Procession of Souls (circa 1890)

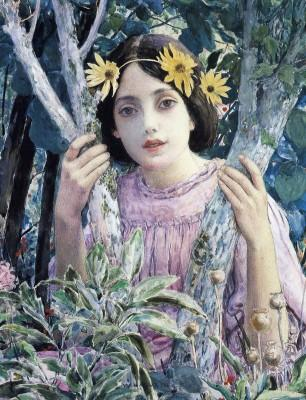
Idyll (circa 1890)

== Other selected works ==
- Le Foyer, musée des Beaux-Arts in Nantes.
- Musée d'Orsay in Paris
  - Le Sphinx et la Chimère, 1906, oil, 80x73 cm
  - Portrait de Jeune Homme, 1881, huile sur toile, 57x44,5 cm
- Une prière à Dieu, 1900, watercolor
- Procession des Âmes, 1893, oil, 67.4 x 44 cm
- L'Innocence, about 1895, oil, 73 x 50.4 cm, Amsterdam, Van Gogh museum.

== See also ==
- Symbolism

== Bibliography ==
- Lucas Bonekamp, Louis Welden Hawkins, 1849–1910, exhibition catalogue, Van Gogh Museum, Amsterdam, 1993 – Available on Archive.org
- Cécile Convert, La figure féminine dans l'œuvre de Louis Welden Hawkins, École du Louvre, May 2017 – Available on ResearchGate
