= York Redoubt =

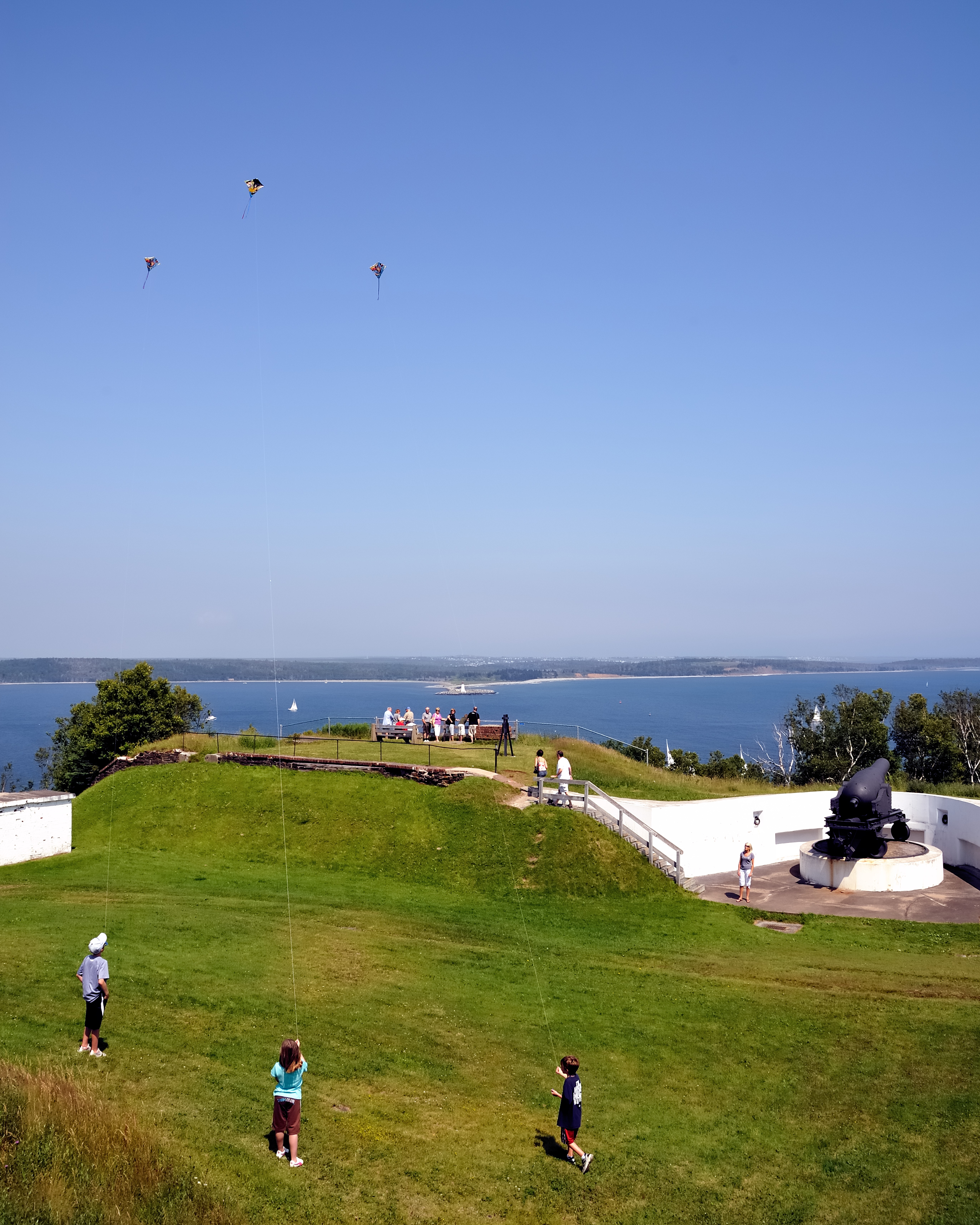
- View at York Redoubt showing its commanding view over the approaches to Halifax Harbour

- Location within Nova Scotia
- 44°35′47.7″N 63°33′8.78″W
- Location: Ferguson's Cove, Nova Scotia, Canada

History
- Built: 1793

Site notes
- Governing body: Parks Canada

National Historic Site of Canada
- Official name: York Redoubt National Historic Site of Canada
- Designated: 1962

York Redoubt is a redoubt situated on a bluff overlooking the entrance to Halifax Harbour at Ferguson's Cove, Nova Scotia, Canada, originally constructed in 1793. It was designated a National Historic Site of Canada in 1962.

== History ==
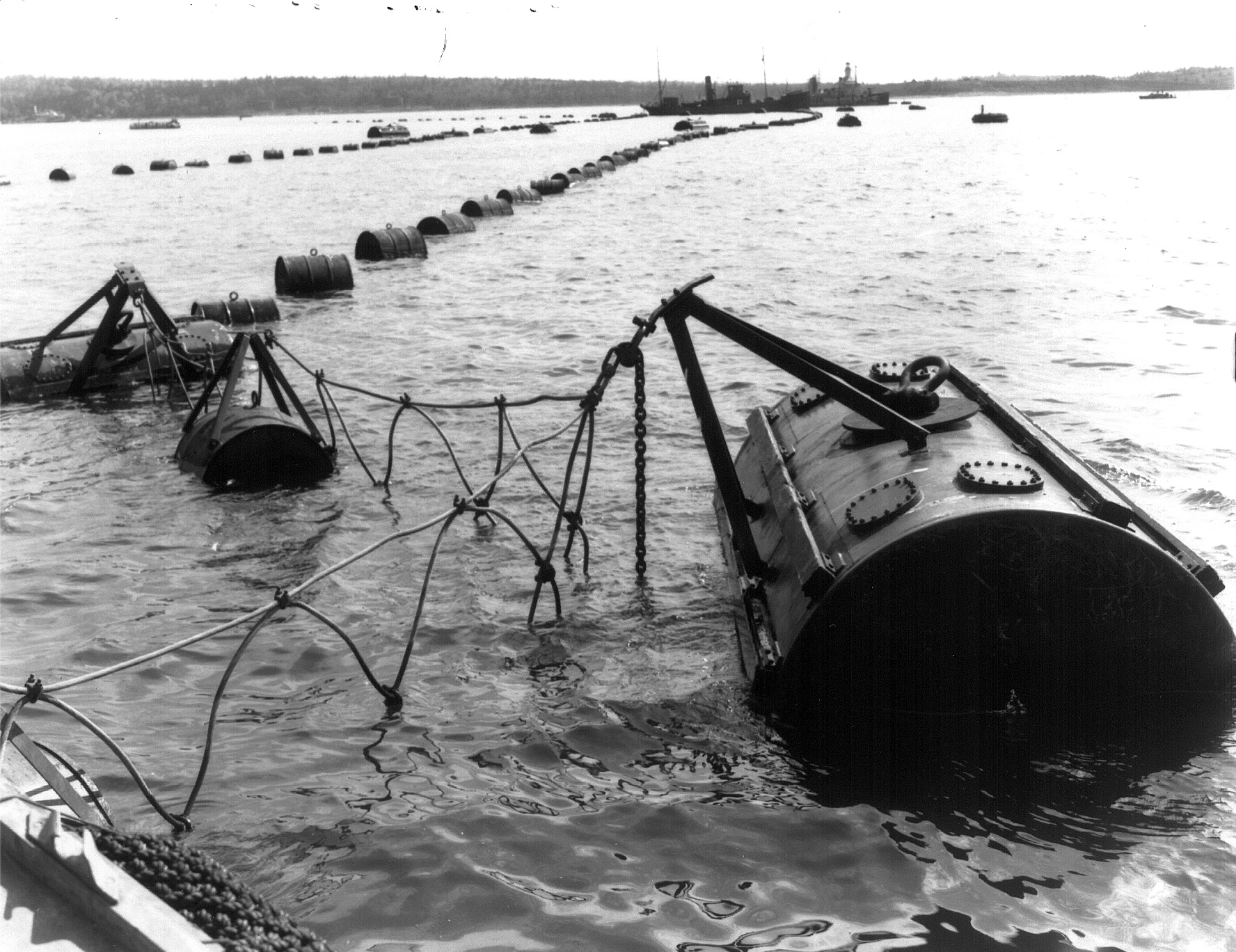
An anti-submarine net running between York Redoubt and McNab's Island in 1942

York Redoubt was a key element in the defence of Halifax Harbour in the 19th and 20th centuries, and saw many additions to its fortifications. It was a command centre for the local harbour defences in World War II, which included observation posts, a defensive minefield and a new gun battery below the fort at Sleepy Cove covering the anti-submarine net which stretched across the harbour's entrance from Fort McNab on McNabs Island. York Redoubt remained in military use until 1956.

Buildings in the redoubt complex include what remains of the Duke of York's Martello tower, built in 1798; other fortifications from around 1800 and 1900; and advanced fortifications and artillery from World War II. York Redoubt has many examples of rifled muzzle loader cannon from the 1870s period. An open-air collection of unmounted cannon within the fort has several pieces of artillery of various periods, including a large 9.62-inch breech loader that had been mounted at the Sandwich Point battery, part of the York Redoubt complex.

Structures at the water's edge at Sleepy Cove battery, now closed to the public, include three search light batteries, two concrete lookout towers and two gun emplacements which originally held two 12-pounder guns, but were later replaced with 6-pounder guns.

On 28 June 1985, Canada Post issued "York Redoubt, N.S.", one of the twenty stamps in the "Forts Across Canada Series" (1983 & 1985).

== Sandwich Point Battery ==
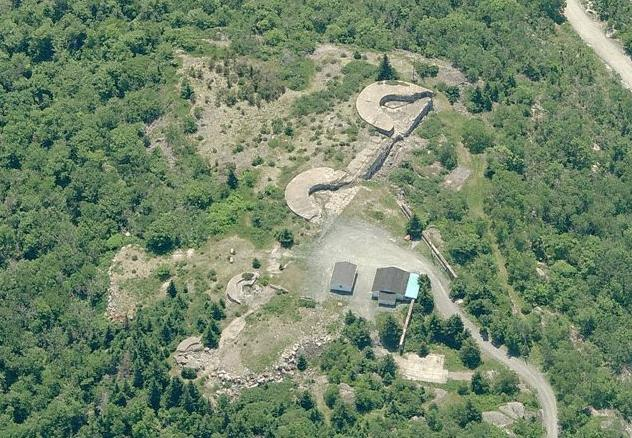
Sandwich point battery

The series of four gun emplacements was constructed during World War I one kilometre away from the main fort at York Redoubt to protect the approaches to Halifax Harbour. During World War II the two dated 9.2-inch breech-loading guns were removed, but the two 6-inch breech-loaders were retained throughout the war. The battery is currently derelict and completely contained within Department of National Defence fenced land (home to Canadian Forces Naval Engineering School) and is strictly off limits to the public (gates restrict road access to Gas Lane via Fire and Smoke Roads from John Bracket Drive).

== Transportation ==
York Redoubt is served by Halifax Transit route 415, which terminates at a bus loop just outside the redoubt's gate.

== See also ==
- Connaught Battery
- Military history of Nova Scotia
- List of oldest buildings and structures in Halifax, Nova Scotia
