= Bill Lynch Show =

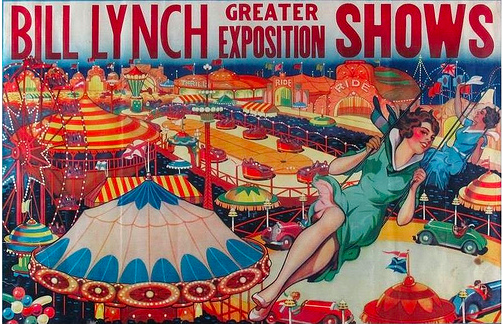
Bill Lynch Show Poster

The Bill Lynch Show was a carnival that was the largest in Canada during the 1940s. The Carnival was run by business man and philanthropist William Lynch (1903–1972) of McNabs Island, Halifax, Nova Scotia. The Carnival toured the Maritimes for decades.

The Bill Lynch Show was first established on McNab's Island in 1920. There was one ride: a merry-go-round. He moved the business from the Island and began touring rural Nova Scotia in 1924. In 1928, he added a second ride: a Ferris wheel. The following year he brought his show to Halifax for the first time. By 1956 the Bill Lynch show was massive, towing 27 railway cars of rides, games and performers all around the Maritimes. Lynch hired acts such as The Turtle Girl, The Tattooed Man, The Worlds Fattest Couple, and conjoined twins Ronnie and Donnie. Lynch allowed disabled children to ride for free. Donations were made to various children's charities. Lynch shows was broken up into Maritime Amusements and Carnival Time in 2003.

After 52 years in the business, Lynch died in 1972. Clarence Reid eventually took it over and ran it for another twenty years before he died in 1995. It is currently owned and operated by John T. Drummey, former controller for Bill Lynch Shows for about 20 years.
