= Maria Olenina-d'Alheim =

Russian-French singer (1869–1970)

Maria Olenina-d'Alheim Мария Оленина-д’Альгейм
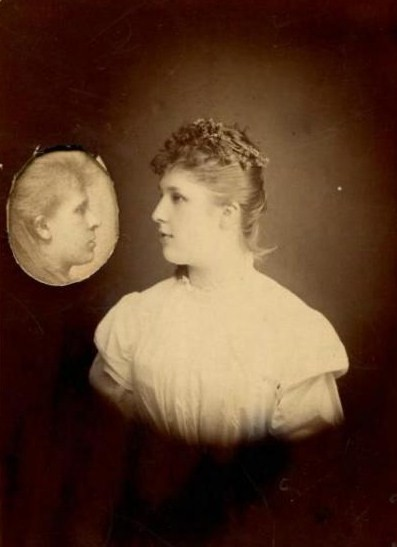
- Portrait, c. 1885

Background information
- Born: Maria Alexeyevna Olenina; October 1, 1869; Kasimov, Russia
- Died: August 26, 1970 (aged 100) Moscow, Soviet Union
- Occupation: Mezzo-soprano
- Years active: 1891–1942
- Spouse: Pierre d'Alheim (m. 1898; died 1922)

Maria Alexeyevna Olenina-d'Alheim (/dælˈeɪm/; dal-AYM; née Olenina; October 1 [O.S. September 19] 1869 – August 26, 1970) was a Russian mezzo-soprano and the first Russian chamber music singer. She was one of the foremost interpreters of Russian art song in the early twentieth century. She is best known for championing the vocal works of Modest Mussorgsky, whose music she introduced to Western audiences through extensive concert tours in France and Britain in the 1920s. She also premiered several of Nikolai Medtner's compositions.

She established the House of Song, a private high society intellectual organization dedicated to vocal music, in Moscow in 1908 with her husband, Baron Pierre d'Alheim. The society was attended by notable musicians and intellectuals including Andrei Bely, Joel Engel, Valery Bryusov, and Maurice Ravel. The House of Song hosted competitions, lectures, recitals, and journal publications for a decade until her emigration to France in 1918 after the Bolshevik revolution.

She performed widely across Western Europe and gave her final performance in 1942. During the German occupation of France, she sheltered Jews in her Paris apartment as a member of the French Resistance. She later joined the French Communist Party. Although her performances were widely acclaimed by contemporary audiences, none of her recordings are known to survive.

== Early life and education ==
Maria Alexeyevna Olenina was born in 1869 at her family's Istomino estate near the town of Kasimov in the Ryazan Governorate of the Russian Empire. She was born into the Russian nobility as the younger daughter of Alexei Petrovich Olenin, a pianist and composer, and Varvara Alexandrovna Bakunina. Her brother Alexander Olenin (1861–1944) became a composer of over a dozen works. Her father was appointed director of the Stroganov Art School in Moscow in 1882.

As a girl, she suffered from poor eyesight, heightening her hearing and musical memory. Brought up in the countryside of central Russia, she was strongly influenced by Russian folk music. She was exposed to byliny (epic ballads) sung by peasant farmers about legendary figures like Dobrynya Nikitich and Alyosha Popovich.

Olenina-d'Alheim descended from multiple notable Russian artists and officials. Her grandfather, Pyotr Olenin (1794–1868), was a painter and major general, and her great grandfather Alexey Olenin was an archaeologist who presided over the Imperial Academy of Arts from 1817 to 1843. She was also related to Anna Olenina, a writer who courted Alexander Pushkin.

In 1887, her family moved to Saint Petersburg. She began to study music under Yuliya Platonova, a proponent of the new Russian school of music. Impressed by Olenina's gifts, Platonova recommended her to Mily Balakirev and Vladimir Stasov. That winter, they invited her to perform at Balakirev's house. There, she met the "Mighty Handful" of composers, including Pyotr Ilyich Tchaikovsky, César Cui, Anatoly Lyadov, Alexander Glazunov, and Nikolai Rimsky-Korsakov, who reacted with enormous enthusiasm to her singing.

== Career ==
Olenina-d'Alheim made her debut in 1891 singing chamber music at the Circle of Lovers of Russian Music, a private concert organization in Moscow. Her rich musical style and mezzo-soprano voice attracted the interest of composers belonging to the so-called New Russian School of music. She began to collaborate with Medtner and Balakirev on vocal compositions and performed in Paris and Brussels for the first time in 1896. Balakirev took particular interest in her and supported the start of her singing career. Medtner became an admirer, and she premiered many of his chamber music pieces in the following years.

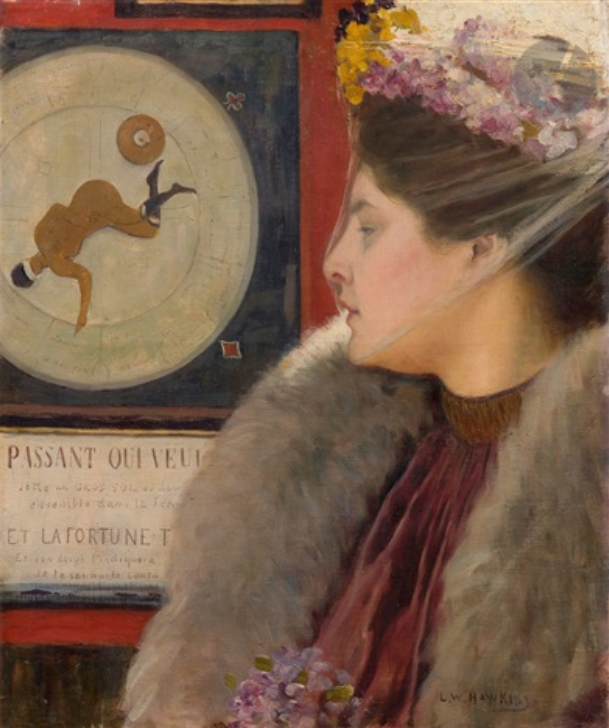
Portrait by Louis Welden Hawkins, c. 1897–1900

She published a work on Mussorgsky's music in 1908 in Paris, with the Russian translation published two years later. She was a strong supporter of the "Mighty Handful" (Tchaikovsky, Rimsky-Korskakov, Cui, Alexander Borodin, and their contemporaries) and was called an "excellent linguist". Regarding her performances, Russian music critic César Cui noted that Olenina-d'Alheim was the first Russian chamber music singer and commented that:

St. Petersburg has heard singers with stronger, perhaps even more beautiful, voices, and with more perfect, although entirely superfluous, coloratura, but more talented – never!

— César Cui (1902)

Alexander Blok dedicated his poem Dark, Pale Green (Russian: Тёмная, бледно-зелёная) to her in 1905. The English painter Louis Welden Hawkins painted a portrait of her between 1897 and 1900 while working in Paris.

=== House of Song ===
While touring in France, she met the French writer and music critic Baron Pierre d'Alheim (1862–1922) who had written a monograph on Mussorgsky in 1896, and the two married in 1898. She returned to Russia with her husband and, with the aid of Anna Vasilyevna Tarsevich, they established the House of Song in Moscow, a private high society intellectual organization dedicated to popularizing and performing vocal chamber music, and to discussing Russian literature and composition. The society was called "a small club for romance lovers".

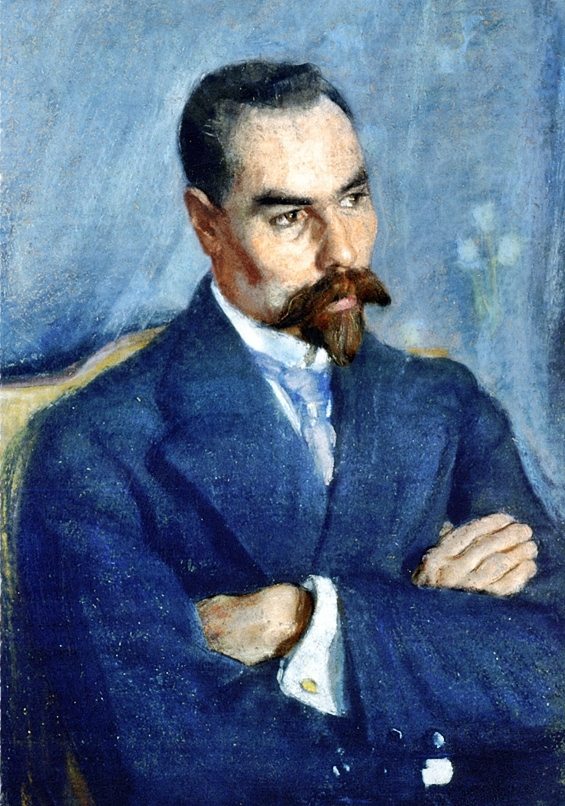
Poets like Valery Bryusov participated in conversations that accompanied musical performances

At the inaugural performance in 1908, Olenina-d'Alheim performed Die schöne Müllerin by Franz Schubert. The principal focus of the organization was on the work of Russian composers, and particularly on the compositions of Mussorgsky. The organization enjoyed wide participation from notable musicians and intellectuals in Moscow, including Medtner and Valery Bryusov, and the house regularly hosted concerts, lectures, and music competitions across a number of cities in Russia, as well as in Paris and London. Singers were accompanied by notable pianists including Aleksandr Goldenweiser, Lev Conus, Andrei Bely, and her brother Alexander.

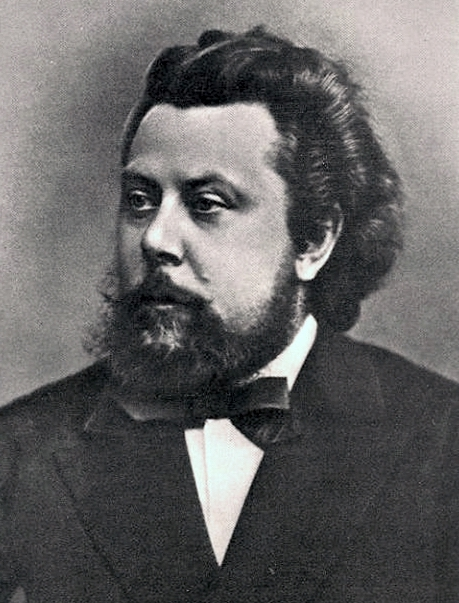
Mussorgsky in 1876

In 1912, Olenina-d'Alheim also established the "Song Society", an intellectual circle dedicated to studying the work of composers and training vocal composers. Between 1908 and 1916, the House of Song held seven international music and poetry competitions with participation from foreign composers. The jury consisted of Medtner, Alexander Taneyev, Nikolay Kashkin, Alexander Gretchaninov, and Joel Engel.

Awards were given for the best translations into Russian of poetry by Wilhelm Müller and Johann Wolfgang von Goethe and set to the musical scores of Schubert, Robert Schumann, Franz Liszt, Hugo Wolf, or Medtner. It was in this context that Medtner composed his Twelve Songs after Goethe in 1908 and Six Poems after Goethe the following year. Awards were also given for the best arrangements of Robert Burns' ten Scottish songs for voice and piano, which were won by Sergei Tolstoy and Paul Vidal, and for the harmonization of Russian folk songs, which were won by her brother Alexander as well as Alexandre Georges and Maurice Ravel.

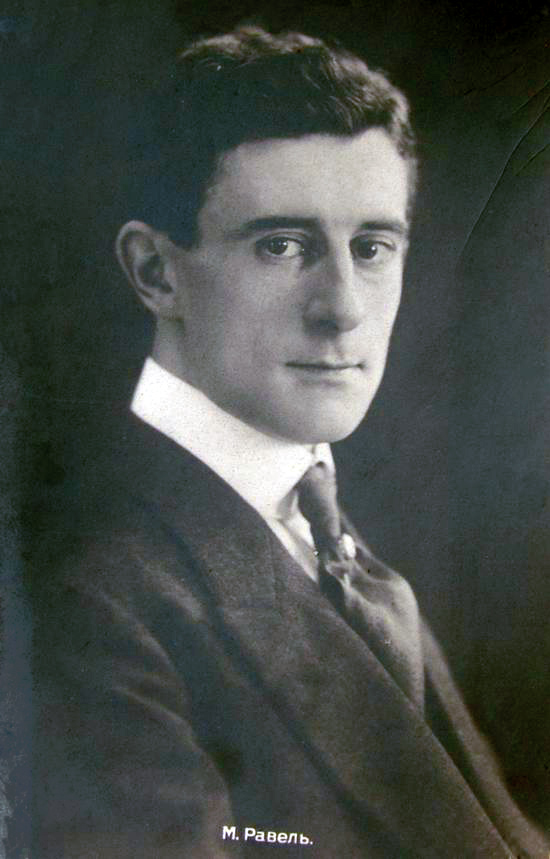
Ravel in Russia (1910)

The House of Song published its own newspaper, Dom pesni, printed in both Russian and French. It also produced bulletins and annotated brochures for concerts. It served as a focal point for Russian musical intellectuals until 1918, when Olenina-d'Alheim and her husband fled Russia.

=== Emigration to France ===
Following the October Revolution in 1917, numerous intellectuals and artists left Russia as part of the white émigré, including Medtner and Sergei Rachmaninoff. Olenina-d'Alheim and her husband returned to France in 1918 amid Pierre's serious illness. They settled in Paris, where she continued holding concerts of Russian music and hosting creative evenings with Russian poets like Bryusov and Bely.

Olenina-d'Alheim toured cities in France, England, and Norway in the 1920s, promoting Mussorgsky's compositions to Western audiences and helping introduce compositions by Balakirev, Mikhail Glinka, and Alexander Dargomyzhsky. She was accompanied on piano by Alfred Cortot and later by Abram Shatskes, a student of Medtner. After the death of her husband Pierre, the House of Music society continued its operations in France until 1924. The Greek composer Georges Poniridy wrote Trois mélodies grecques in 1924, inscribing the manuscript in French with the words "to Madame Olénine, a great artiste, with respectful homage from the composer".

She revisited Moscow and Leningrad to perform three recitals in 1926. Although she had inherited a sizable estate from her husband's noble estate, she began to experience financial difficulties, due in part to pride and her uncompromising support for the Soviet government, which earned her a measure of scorn from fellow Russian émigrés.

During the Nazi occupation of France from 1940 to 1944, she was a member of the resistance movement and sheltered French Jews in her Paris apartment. After the war, she became a member of the French Communist Party in 1946 and joined the Mouvement de la Paix. She also became a member of the USSR–France Society and the Femmes solidaires women's movement.

She was persuaded to write a memoir of her life in the 1940s. She began working on her autobiography, titled Dreams and Recollections, in 1948, which later served as a prominent source for Tumanov's authoritative book on her life and work.

=== Return to Russia ===
In 1959, at nearly the age of 90, she was granted long-sought permission to return to her homeland by the government of the Soviet Union. She moved to Moscow and spent the last decade of her life compiling a memoir of her life. The manuscript, titled To Distant Shores, was never published and is kept by the Russian National Museum of Music.

Olenina-d'Alheim died in Moscow on August 26, 1970, aged 100. She was buried at the Vagankovo Cemetery.

== Personal life ==
Olenina-d'Alheim had a daughter, Marianne d'Alheim, in 1892 who predeceased her in 1910. She brought up her cousin's daughters, Natalia and Anna Turgenev.
