= Lawlor Island =

Island near Halifax Harbour, Nova Scotia, Canada

Coordinates: 44°36′N 63°30′W

Lawlor Island or Lawlor's Island is a small island near the mouth of Halifax Harbour in Eastern Passage, Nova Scotia, Canada. It was the site of a major quarantine facility for immigration from 1866 to 1938 and is today owned by the Nova Scotia Department of Natural Resources as part of the McNabs Island provincial park reserve.

== Geography ==
Measuring approximately 55 hectares (136 acres), it is located opposite MacCormacks Beach in Eastern Passage, just east of McNabs Island in the Halifax Regional Municipality. The island is covered with heavy grown woodland and serves as the protected home of deer and osprey.

== History ==
The Mi'kmaq people occupied the island seasonally in the summer and knew the area around the island as "Tuitnuik", meaning little passage, because of the narrow band of water between the island and the mainland. Following the foundation of Halifax in 1749, Captain Thomas Bloss was granted an island in Halifax Harbour on September 30, 1750 which later bore his name. Bloss Island was one of many names used for the island until the late 19th century, when it became widely known as Lawlor Island. In 1758, the island bore the name Webb's Island. In 1792, it was referred to as Carroll's Island. In 1821, James Lawlor, into whose hands the island had passed, offered a reward for the conviction of persons who had stolen his sheep from the island. In this notice the island is referred to as McNamara's Island. Thomas Chandler Haliburton, in 1829, refers to the island as Duggan's Island. Shortly afterwards the island was referred to as Warren's Island. Lawlor's farming activity on the island eventually resulted it in being known by his name. In 1864, during the American Civil War, the CSS Tallahassee, a Confederate naval raider blockade runner passed by Lawlor Island using Eastern Passage, seldom used by larger vessels, to escape from pursuing Northern naval forces.

== Quarantine station ==
In 1866, after a fatal outbreak of cholera from passengers embarked from the SS England on McNabs Island, the government of Nova Scotia passed an act to establish a quarantine station on Lawlor Island. The purchase was taken over by the new Canadian federal government in 1867 although difficulties in finding the island's absentee owners delayed the establishment of the station until 1870. Many local residents (most on the Eastern Passage side) protested against the idea of having infectious disease so close to their homes; some were concerned about germs that would blow across the fields and water into their homes. Many port officials and doctors also protested against the idea, being concerned that Lawlor's Island had no natural springs or fresh water, and also that the flow of ice during the winter would create difficulties in bringing boats in. An early quarantine officer was Dr William Wickwire, who assumed responsibility for quarantine duties after the indefinite suspension of Dr Gossip for incompetence. Dr. Norman McKay took control of these duties soon afterwards. By 1900, officials had the island fitted with a deep-water wharf, a shallow-water wharf (on the Eastern Passage side), two hospitals and a convalescent building, a disinfection autoclave, baths with needle showers, a bacteria diagnosis laboratory, a first, second and third-class detention hall, an ambulance building, many residences and staff housing; also, the building that was referred to as "the long shed" or "German Hospital" on McNabs Island was taken down and reassembled on the west side of the island.

The buildings were not winterized, but by 1908 a winterized hospital and power plant had been built. Not long after World War I, a submarine cable was installed from Eastern Passage, receiving power from Dartmouth and on the highest point of land, right next to a frost-proof cement cistern built 20 years prior, a 360,000-litre (80,000 imperial gallon) water tower was erected, thus solving the problem of a steady flow of fresh water on the island.

With advances in medical science, the discovery of penicillin and vaccination programs, major infectious diseases were now a much reduced threat to public health, and the emergency use of Lawlor's Island as a quarantine station was falling rapidly. During the 1920s and 1930s, the cost of salaries, supplies, and services outweighed the benefits of quarantining minor infectious diseases on Lawlor's Island. Costs included telephone charges, uniforms and large quantities of drugs and medical supplies. Following the Paris International Sanitary Convention of 1926, the Canadian deputy minister of health decided in 1936 that it would cease to house quarantine patients on the island. However when smallpox was detected by Pier 21 medical staff in a steamship sailor in 1938, Lawlor Island was used a final time to contain the outbreak. The sailors and infected medical staff were quarantined and treated on the island. In place of Lawlor's Island, the government used a quarantine space at the Pier 21 immigration terminal and created an isolation ward at the former Rockhead Prison in Halifax's North End in 1938.

The island was purchased by the Canadian government for use as a medical station during the Second World War, to treat venereal diseases brought back by servicemen from Europe. Today it is part of the McNabs Island Provincial Park Reserve.

== Tolstoy ==
Sergei Tolstoy, the eldest son of author Leo Tolstoy, arrived in Halifax on the SS Lake Superior from Russia with 2000 others in 1899. They called themselves Doukhobors, spirit wrestlers, a pacifist community that had been exiled by Tsarist autocracy. They complied with instructions to hoist a yellow quarantine flag after being granted pratique. The vessel was then directed to the deep water wharf at the north west end of the island. Tolstoy acted on their behalf and direct instructions from Dr Frederick Montizambert on leave from Grosse Île quarantine station during this time. Their stay lasted three weeks. Accommodation was limited, and the Doukhobors found where hired contractors were building a new detention centre. Probably encouraged by the high wages being paid, the new residents from Russia built a two-storey annex needed for a new detention centre for third class patients. Although Count Tolstoy and island official Guy Carlton Jones had differences, in his memoirs Sergei had compared the land and vegetation to that of Siberia and found the small island and Halifax a comfortable brief stay.

Local Haligonians had found these Doukhobors quite special in their enlightenment and enjoyed the churek that the women baked in the cookhouse. The first Doukhobor birth in Canada occurred during this stay on Lawlor's Island.

== Mystery ==
An unexplained issue on Lawlor's Island is the fact that there have been a vast number of deaths due to cholera, smallpox and German measles. Although there are only eight grave markers on the northern tip, archival records of Harwood Cemetery seem almost non-existent as there are no landmarks or map legends for these missing graves.

== Today ==
Lawlor's Island is uninhabited and has been deserted since the last family of caretakers left during the 1950s. The closure of the station left extensive ruins with scattered foundations and traces of the piping cistern systems. Although rusted and weathered, the large double steel walled autoclave and boiler that disinfected clothing and luggage with high pressure steam, remains on the northwest shore, next to where the docking pier once stood. Nearby are the foundations of the bath house and administration shed. The island is part of the McNabs Island provincial park reserve but is not open to the public.

== Sources and links ==
- Friends of McNabs Island History of Lawlor Island
- McNabs and Lawlor Islands Provincial Park Management Plan
- Doukobor Quarantine
- Photo of Lawlor Island from Space
