= Sergei Tolstoy =

Russian composer (1863–1947)

- Сергей Львович Толсто́й
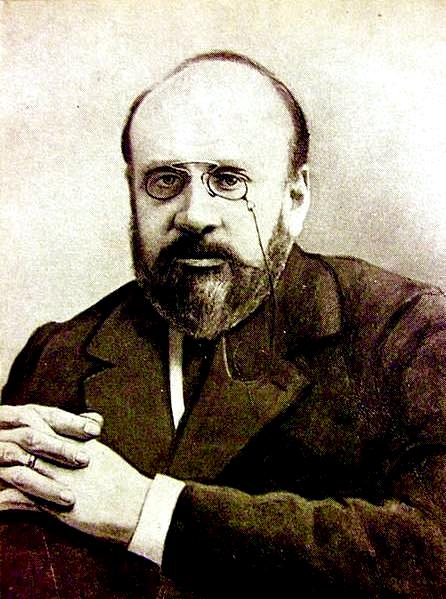
- Tolstoy in the 1900s
- Born: Sergei Lvovich Tolstoy; 28 September 1863; Yasnaya Polyana, Russia
- Died: 23 December 1947 (aged 84); Moscow, Soviet Union
- Resting place: Vvedenskoye Cemetery
- Spouse(s): Maria Konstantinovna Rachinskaya; Maria Nikolaevna Zubova
- Children: Sergei Sergeyevich Tolstoy
- Parents: Leo Tolstoy (father); Sophia Tolstaya (mother)

Count Sergei Lvovich Tolstoy (Russian: Сергей Львович Толстой; 10 July 1863 – 23 December 1947]) was a Russian composer and ethnomusicologist who was among the first Europeans to make an in-depth study of the music of India. He was also an associate of the Sufi mystic, Inayat Khan, and participated in helping the Doukhobors move to Canada.

== Biography ==
He was the eldest son of Leo Tolstoy. As a child, he studied music with his mother Sophia. He also studied composition with Sergei Taneyev. From 1881 to 1886, he was enrolled in the "Department of Natural Sciences, Physics and Mathematics" at Moscow University, while attending classes at the Moscow Conservatory taught by Nikolay Kashkin.

After graduating, he worked in the Tula branch of the Peasants' Land Bank and later became a manager at the Saint Petersburg branch. In 1890, he became head of the zemstvo for Chernsky District, near the family estate. Over the next ten years, he came to the defense of many Tolstoyans who were being suppressed for anti-government activities; notably Leopold Sulerzhitsky. From 1898 to 1899, he helped to organize the Doukhobor community for resettlement in Western Canada and accompanied them to Lawlor Island in Nova Scotia. He was married in 1895, but his wife died of tuberculosis five years later after a separation of two years. He remarried in 1906.

During this time, he also composed, setting the words of several poets to music; including Pushkin, Fofanov, Fet and Tyutchev. At the "House of Song" competition in 1908, he was awarded a prize for his settings of ten poems by Robert Burns.

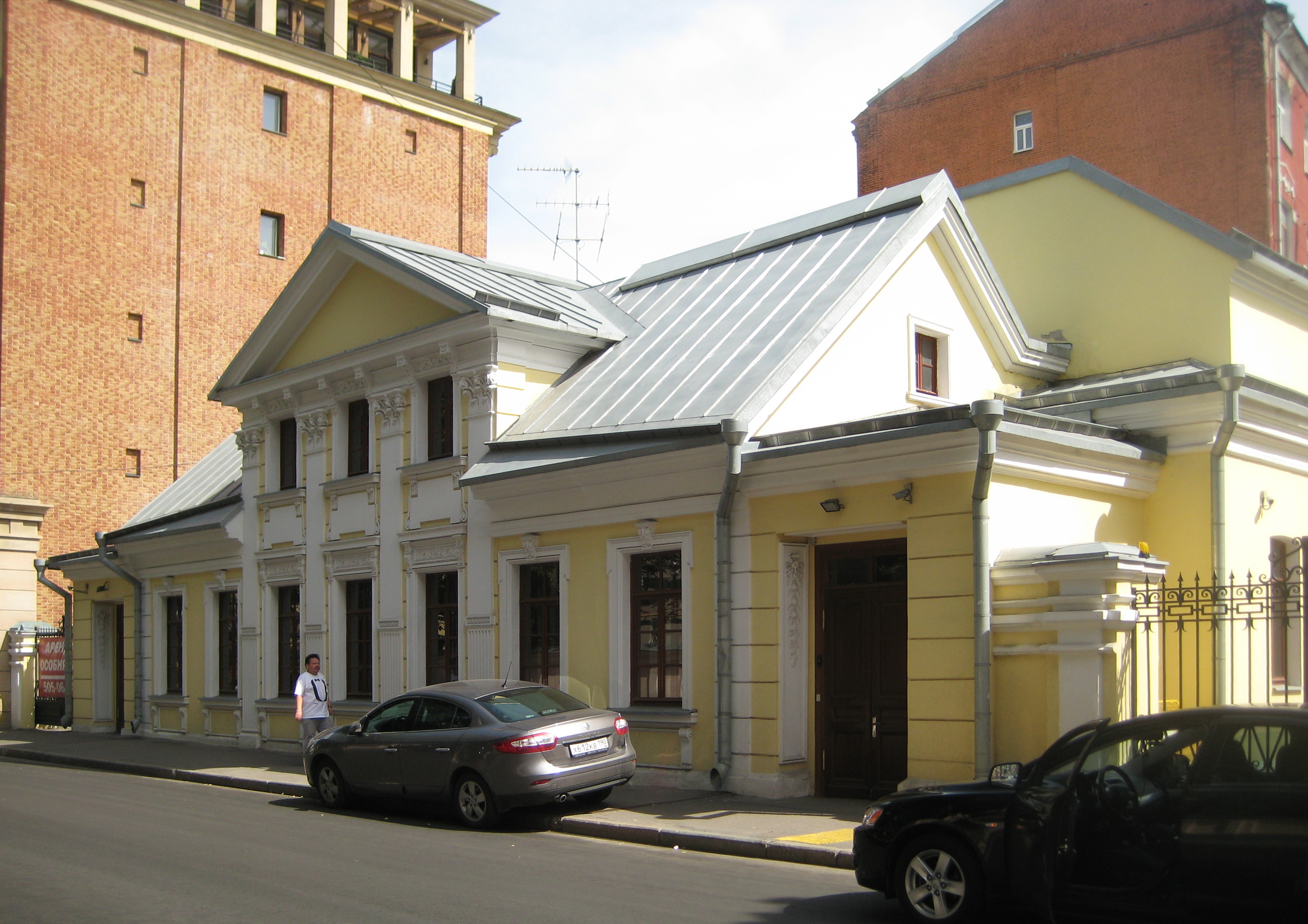
Tolstoy's home on Kropotkin Lane

From 1913 to 1914, he worked with Inayat Khan, who was visiting Russia, and began his studies of Indian music. As a result, he agreed to provide the score for a ballet based on the play Shakuntala by Kālidāsa. In 1915, he published sheet music for "Hindu Songs and Dances" arranged for the piano. Until 1921, he was the Russian representative of Khan's personal Sufi Order.

He also worked to preserve his father's legacy, writing the first guide to Yasnaya Polyana in 1914, as well as several works about the role music played in Tolstoyan philosophy. He also served on a committee devoted to promoting his father's works.

After the October Revolution, he worked in the music department of the People's Commissariat and participated in expeditions to gather folklore. From 1921 to 1930, he was a researcher at the State Institute of Musical Science and, from 1926 to 1930, he was a professor at the Moscow Conservatory. He was also a recipient of the Order of the Red Banner of Labour and a member of the Union of Soviet Composers. His personal papers are archived at the Glinka Museum in Moscow. Most of his music is unpublished and exists in manuscript only.
