= McNabs Island =

Island in Halifax Harbour in Nova Scotia, Canada

Coordinates: 44°36′N 63°31′W

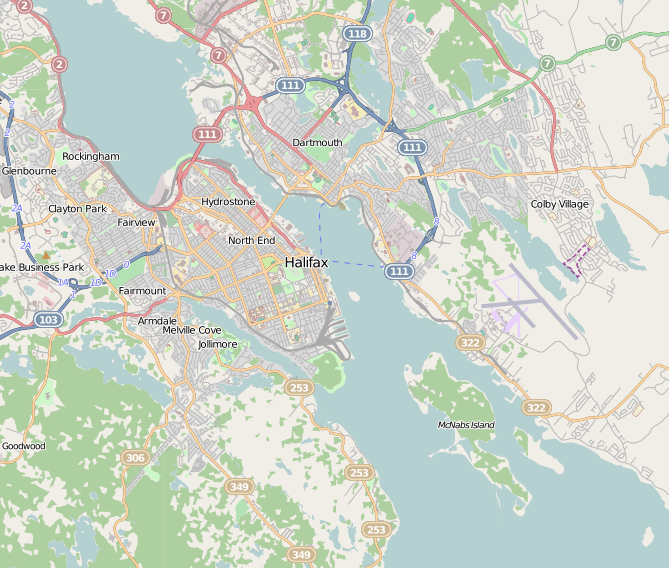
Map of Halifax and McNabs Island

McNabs Island (formerly Cornwallis Island) is the largest island in Halifax Harbour located in Halifax Regional Municipality, Nova Scotia, Canada. It played a major role in defending Halifax Harbour and is now a provincial park. The island was settled by Britons in the 1750s and later by Peter McNab, and McNab family members lived on the island until 1934.

== History ==
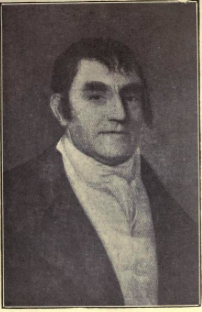
Joshua Mauger

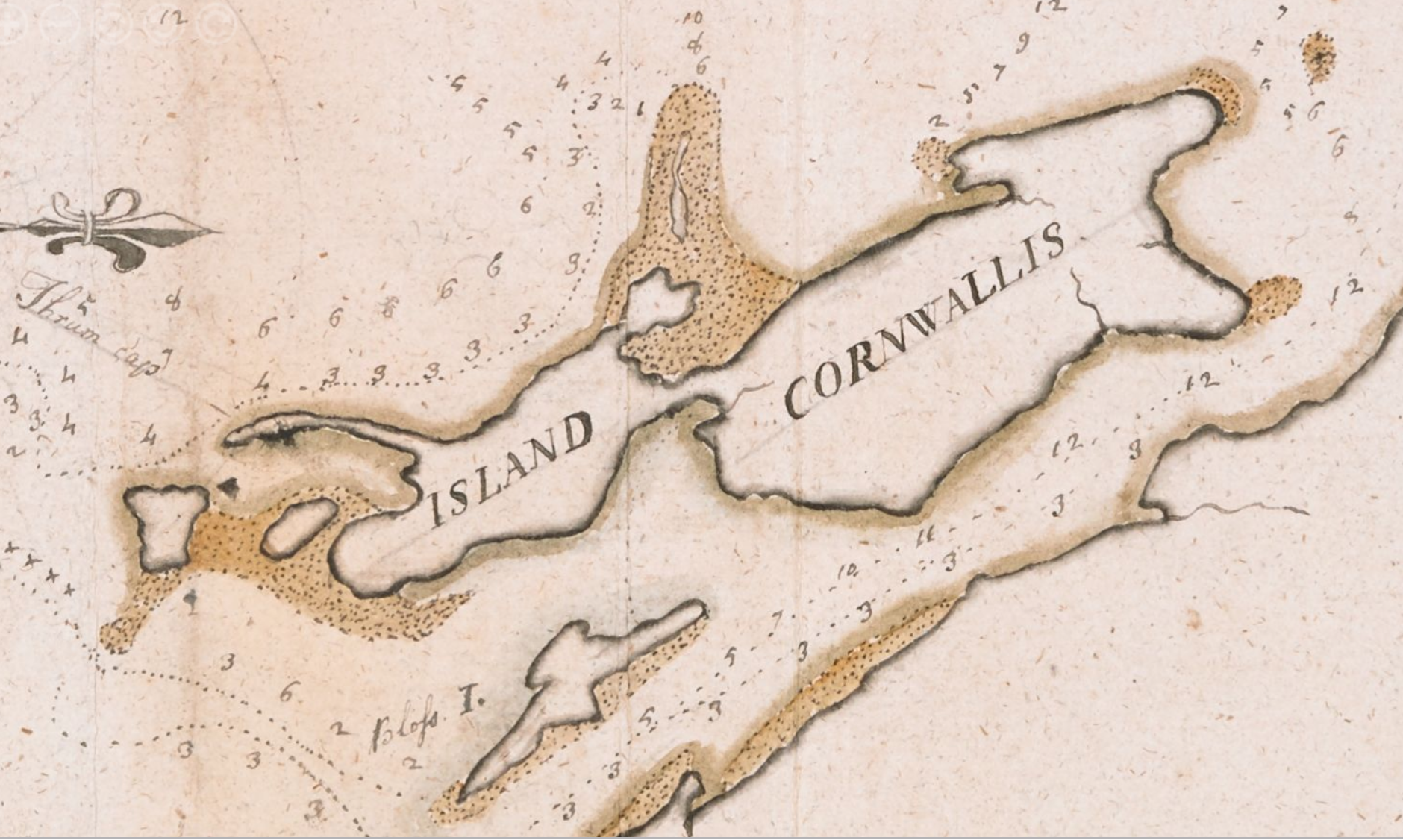
Cornwallis Island (later McNabs Island) (inset of A plan of Halifax Harbour in Nova Scotia, 1760 by R. A. Davenport)

The island saw seasonal Mi'kmaq and Acadian use and was surveyed by the French Navy as a possible site for a fortified seaport prior to the selection of Louisbourg. After the founding of Halifax in 1749, it was first known as Cornwallis Island. One of the early settlers was Joseph Rous (1758), brother of John Rous. Halifax merchant Joshua Mauger used the long beach which still bears his name as a base for a fishing operation in the 1750s and 1760s.

In the 1780s, the island was purchased by Peter McNab (d. 1799, buried at Old Burying Ground), beginning a long settlement by generations of the McNab family on the island. McNab's son, Captain John McNab of the Nova Scotia Fencibles, lived with his daughter Catherine Susan Ann McNabb on McNabs Island. She married Joseph Howe on February 2, 1828.

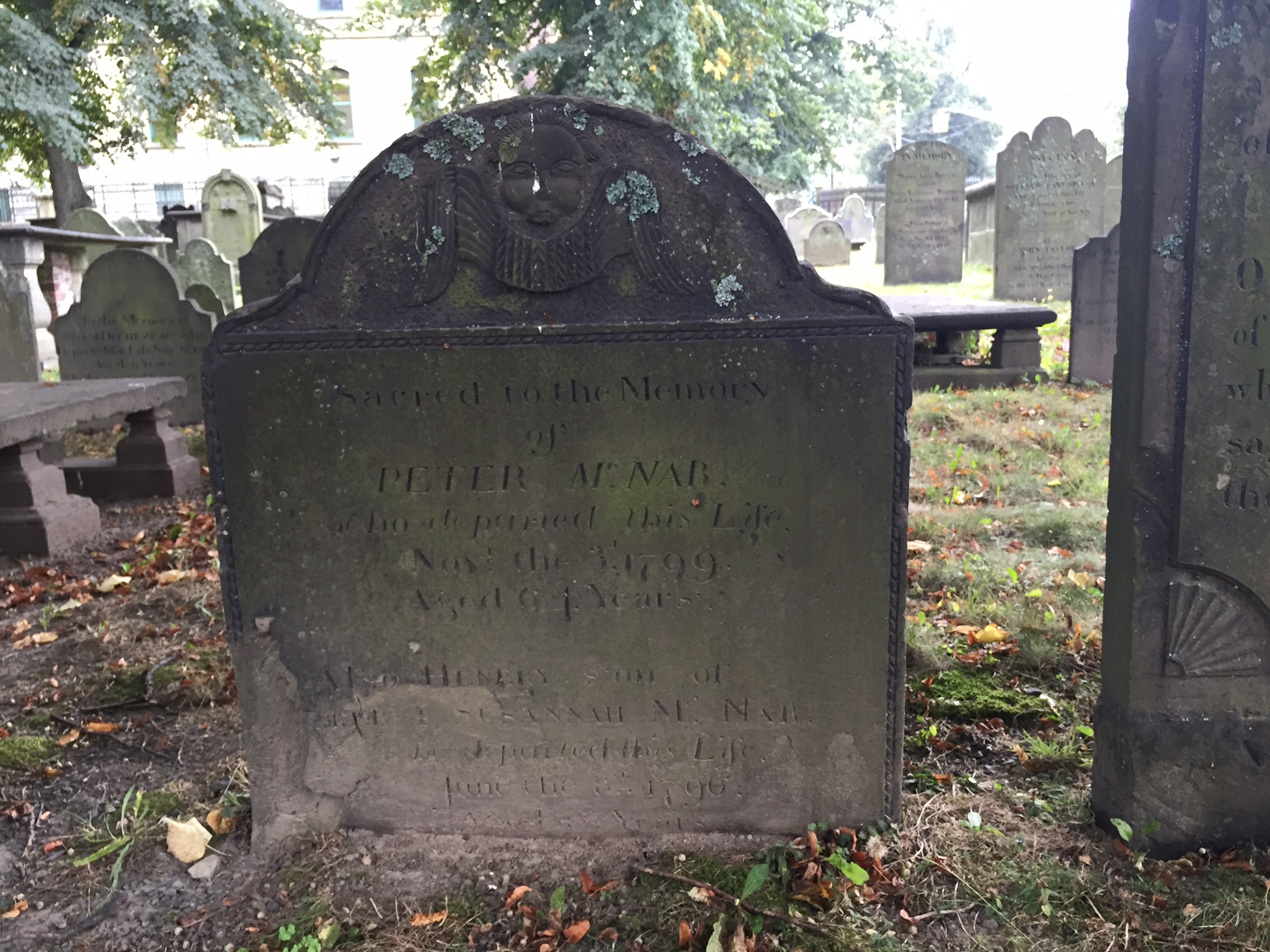
Peter McNab, namesake of McNabs Island, Old Burying Ground

McNabs Island is populated by many military fortifications belonging to the "Halifax Defence Complex" including Fort Ives, Fort Hugonin, Sherbrooke Tower, Fort McNab, and Strawberry Battery. Important historic features on McNabs Island which are still visible include the foundations of several houses built by early settlers, an aboriginal shell midden, a cemetery containing some of the island's earliest residents, remains of a turn-of-the-century picnic ground and soda pop factory, and remnants of a once-extensive Victorian garden. Other historic sites include the original McNab house, Martello Tower, and the main burial site of cholera victims from the SS England.

Maugher Beach, where a lighthouse stands, is also known as "Hangman's Beach" because of its use by the British Royal Navy during the Napoleonic Wars to hang the bodies of executed mutineers as a warning to crews of ships entering the harbour that this was a port where they had best behave themselves. The light at Maughers Beach was used in 1851 by Abraham Gesner to test out the new fuel he had invented, kerosene, to replace whale oil. Although lighthouse officials were skeptical, the careful recording of the efficiency of kerosene by Maughers Beach keeper David George helped establish the fuel for standard use.

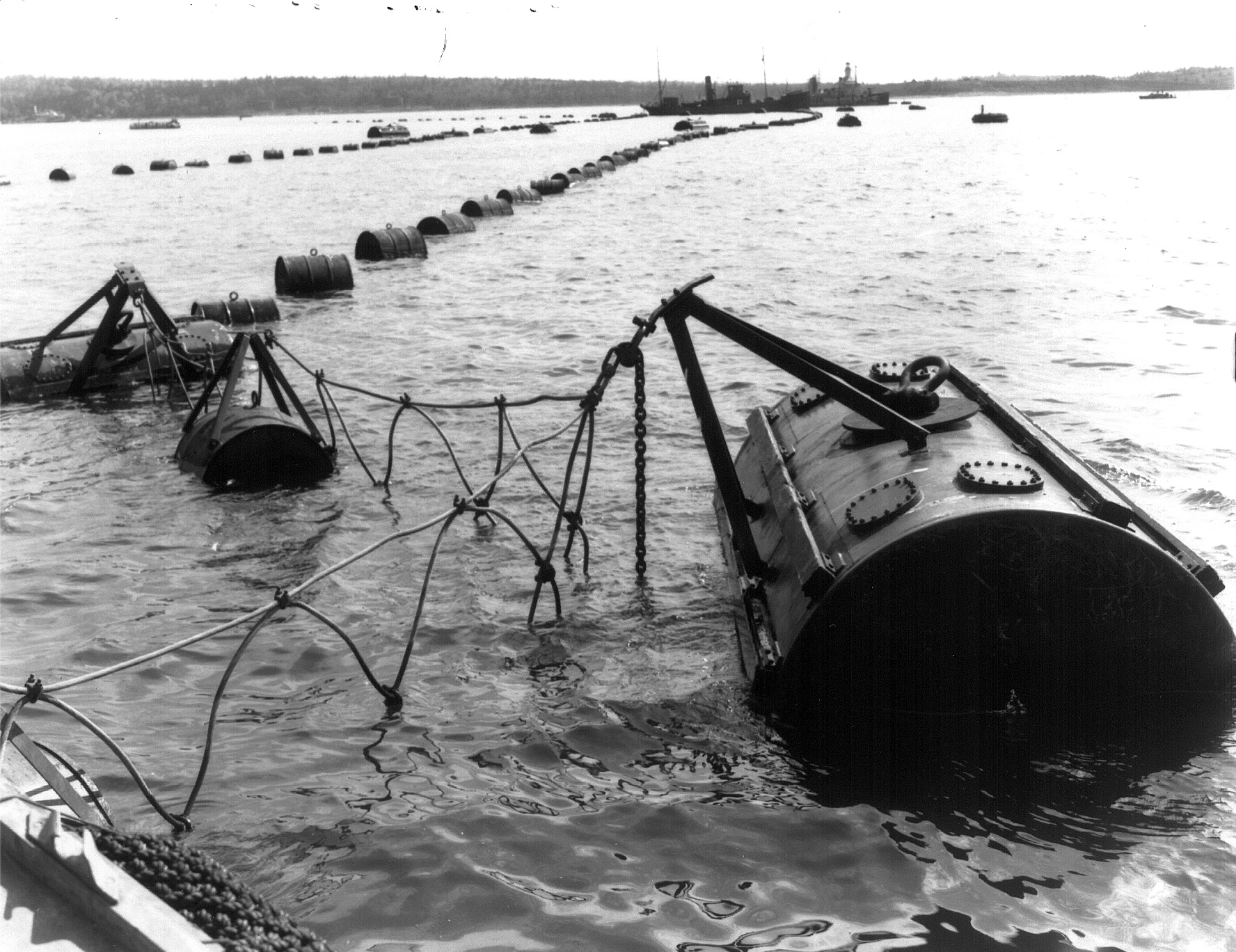
An anti-submarine net running between York Redoubt and McNabs Island.

During World War II new gun batteries, searchlights and a steel anti-submarine net were installed between the island and York Redoubt to prevent German U-boats from entering the harbour. In 1944 and 1945, the Canadian Army used McNabs Island as an isolated prison/detention centre for soldiers convicted of crimes.

McNabs Island was also the home of William Lynch and the location where he started the Bill Lynch Show.

== Today ==
The remains of Fort McNab were designated a National Historic Site of Canada in 1965 as being reflective of the significant changes in defence technology that occurred in the late 19th century.

Today, of McNabs Island's total area of approximately 395 hectares (980 acres), the Province owns 62 percent, the Federal Government 35 percent, and 3 percent is privately owned. Most federal lands on the island are administered as a park reserve by the Department of Heritage, under the responsibility of Parks Canada, which manages the Fort McNab National Historic Site of Canada, except for the Fort Hugonin lands of approximately 11 hectares, which instead are the responsibility of the Defence department. The Province of Nova Scotia manages a provincial park on the island. A group called "Friends of McNabs Island Society" a volunteer, non-profit registered charity based in Halifax, is dedicated to the preservation of McNabs, Lawlor and Devils Islands, and to the promotion of McNabs Island as a nature park and outdoor classroom. The Society hosts events on McNabs Island such as picnics, nature and historical tours, and annual beach clean-ups. The society produces maps and brochures, the popular guidebook Discover McNabs Island, island posters and quarterly newsletters. The society helps maintain the trails along with the Nova Scotia Department of Natural Resources and Parks Canada. There are a few permanent residents living on the island and it is considered a community of the Halifax Regional Municipality.

== Lightkeepers for Maugher Beach lighthouse ==
- 1830–1836 Bolser, J.
- 1840–1846 McGlinn, D.
- 1846–1873 George, David
- 1873–1896 Horn, E.
- 1896–1903 Doody, J.
- 1903–1915 Iceton, W.
- 1915–1936 Conrod, T.
- 1936–1940/1945–1947 MacDonald, J.A.
- 1940–1942 Hull, R.W.
- 1942–1945/1951–1958 Bell, J.J.
- 1948–1951 Hartley, G.R.
- 1958–1959 Lalonde, J.D.
- 1959 Stevens, A.J.
- 1959–1970 Rampton, E.F.
- 1970 Mitchell, L.G.
- 1970 Turner, M.B.
- 1970–1983 Lowe, H.G.
- Automated since 1983

== Lightkeepers for McNabs Island lighthouse ==
- 1903–1905 Doody, J.
- 1905–1932 Lynch, M.
- 1932–1957 Cleveland, Colin W.
- 1957 Lumsden, B.J.
- 1957–1959 Eddy, W.
- Automated 1959-1973
- 1973 – replaced by skeleton tower
- 1976 – structure demolished
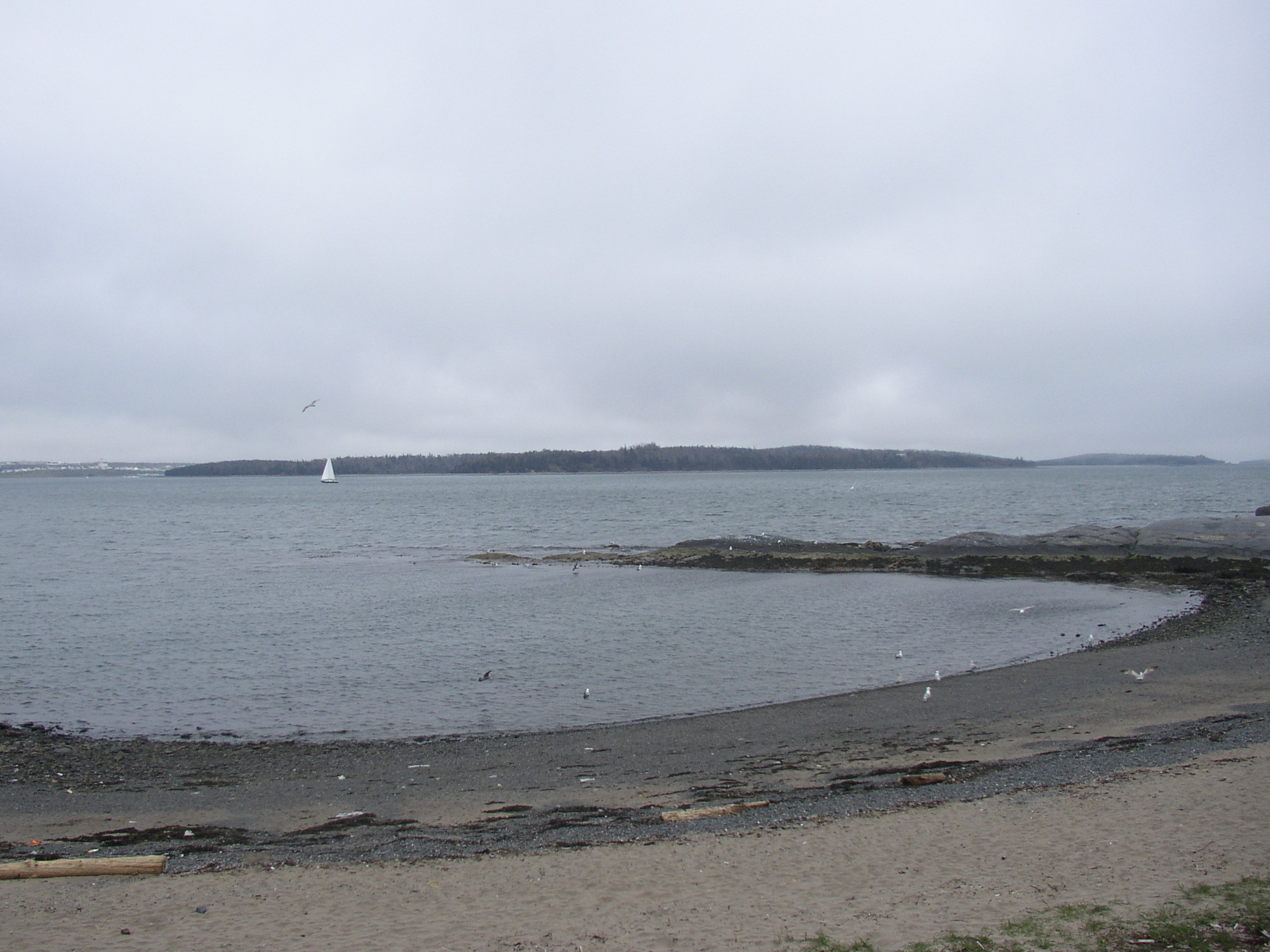

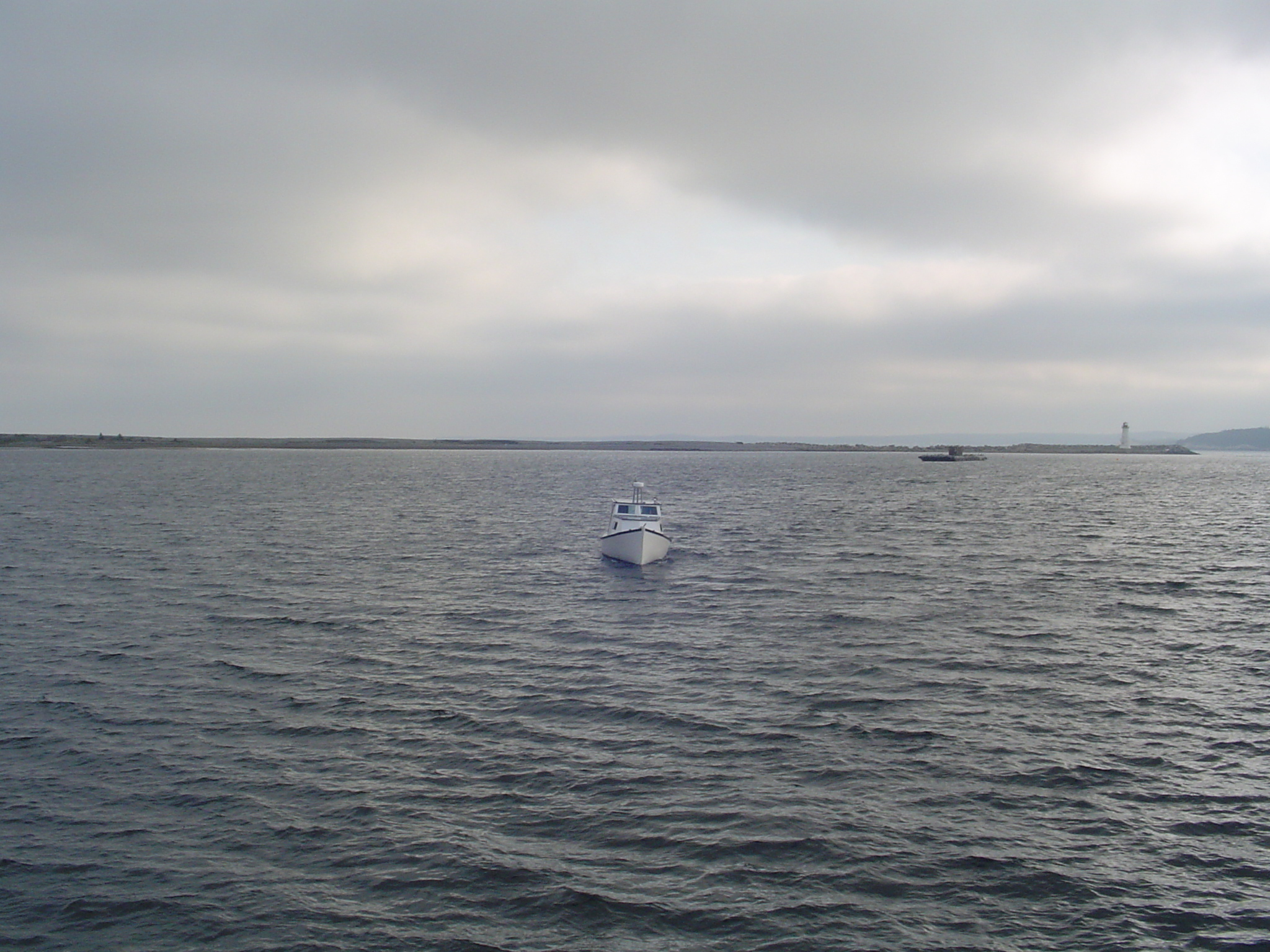

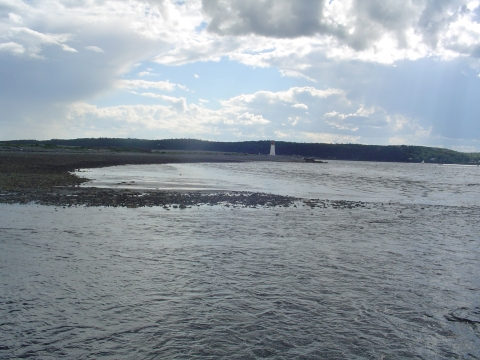

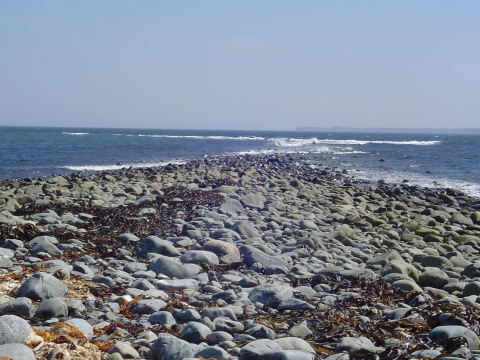

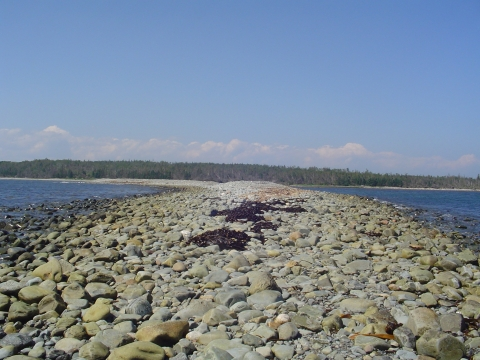

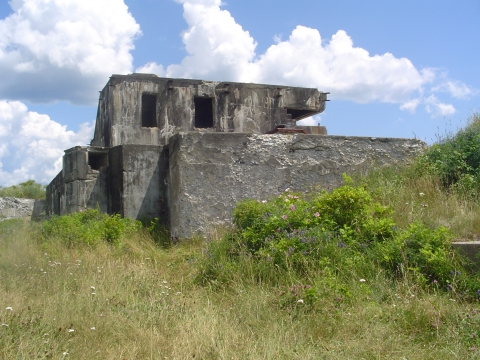

== See also ==
- Military history of Nova Scotia
