= Connaught Battery =

Defence battery in Nova Scotia, Canada

Coordinates: 44°36′18″N 63°33′39″W

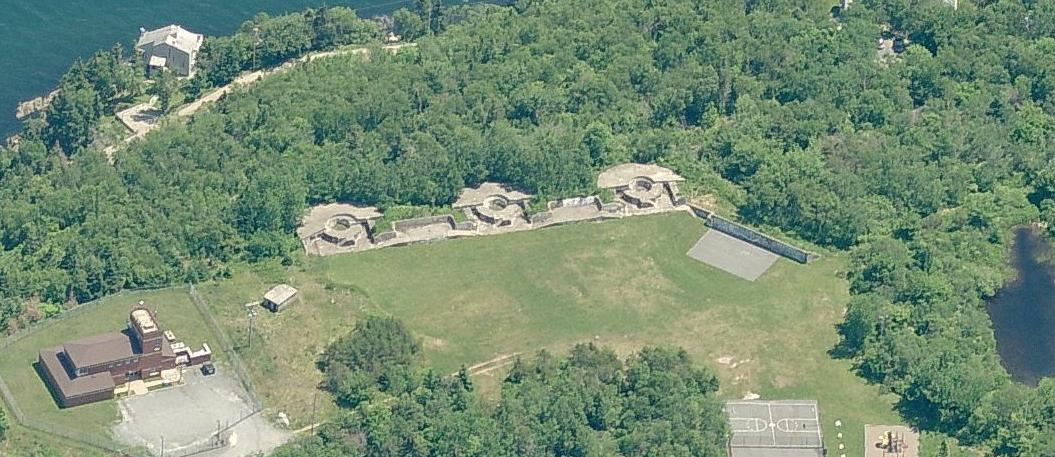
Connaught Battery overlooking the entrance to the inner portion of Halifax Harbor

Connaught Battery in Ferguson's Cove, Nova Scotia

Connaught Battery is a World War I era harbour defence battery located north of York Redoubt at Ferguson's Cove, Nova Scotia, Canada. It took its name from the then Governor General of Canada, the Duke of Connaught, who was Queen Victoria's third son.

== Construction ==
Built between 1912 and 1917 the battery was a part of Halifax Harbour's larger Defence Complex, which included other fortifications such as Fort George (Citadel Hill). Connaught Battery was the only new structure built by the military after 1905, with a grand total area of 2.5 hectares and a floor space of 447 sq. metres.

Since its inception Halifax Harbour has always had strategic and commercial importance, Beginning in the colony's early days it was a well-fortified location. During the Second World War its defences included three 4.7-inch quick-firing guns.

== Today ==
Today Connaught Battery is an abandoned complex, but open to the public to use as a municipal park. The cement casemates of the fort remain in good condition.
