= Cycling in Halifax, Nova Scotia =

Cycling infrastructure in Halifax, Nova Scotia

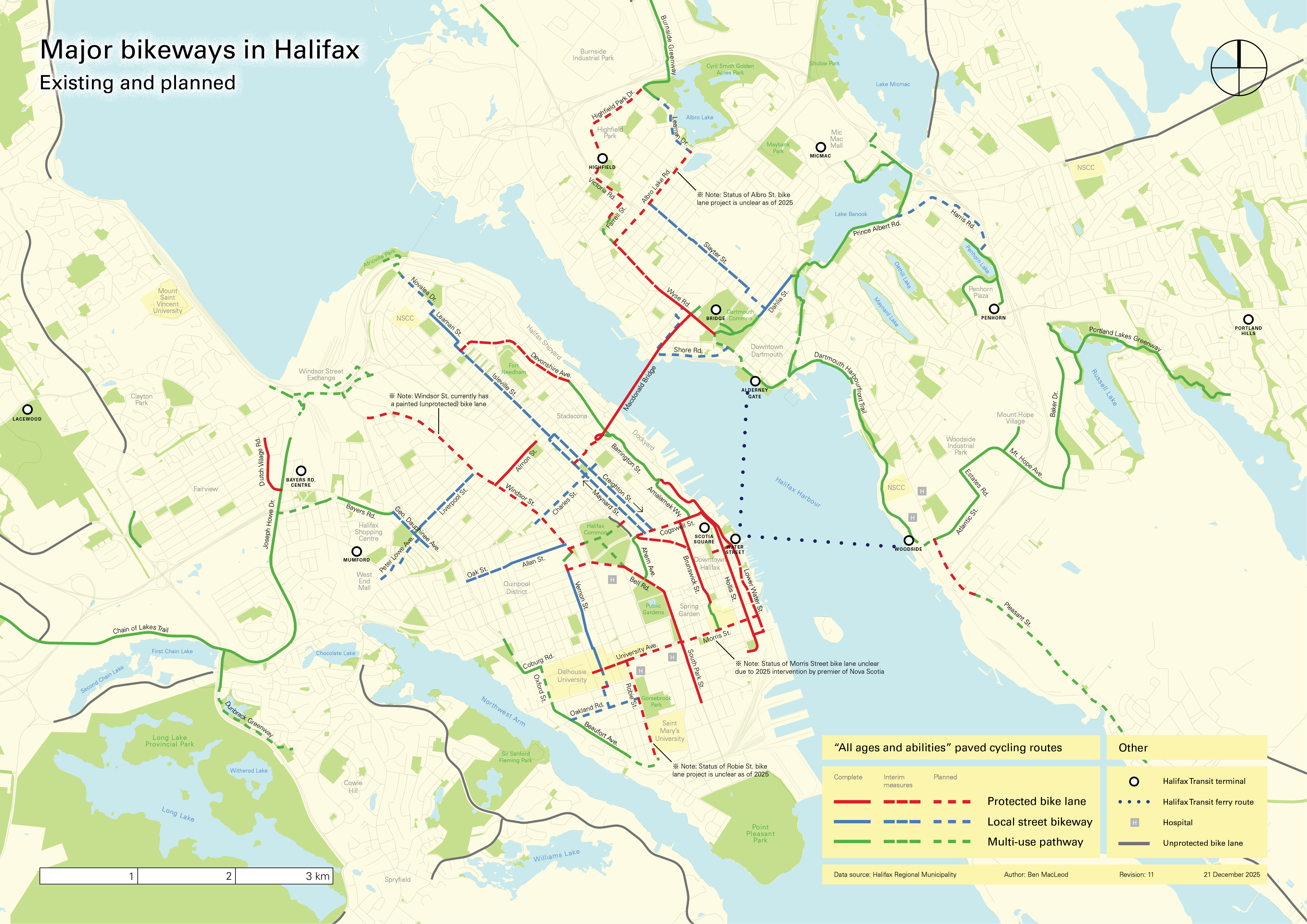
Cycling network map

Cycling infrastructure in the Canadian city of Halifax, Nova Scotia includes most regular streets and roads, bike lanes, protected cycle tracks, local street bikeways, and multi-use pathways.

In recent years, the municipal government has been developing an "all ages and abilities bikeway network" (commonly called the "AAA network") in the urban core with the aim of increasing the proportion of trips that are made by bicycle.

== Development ==
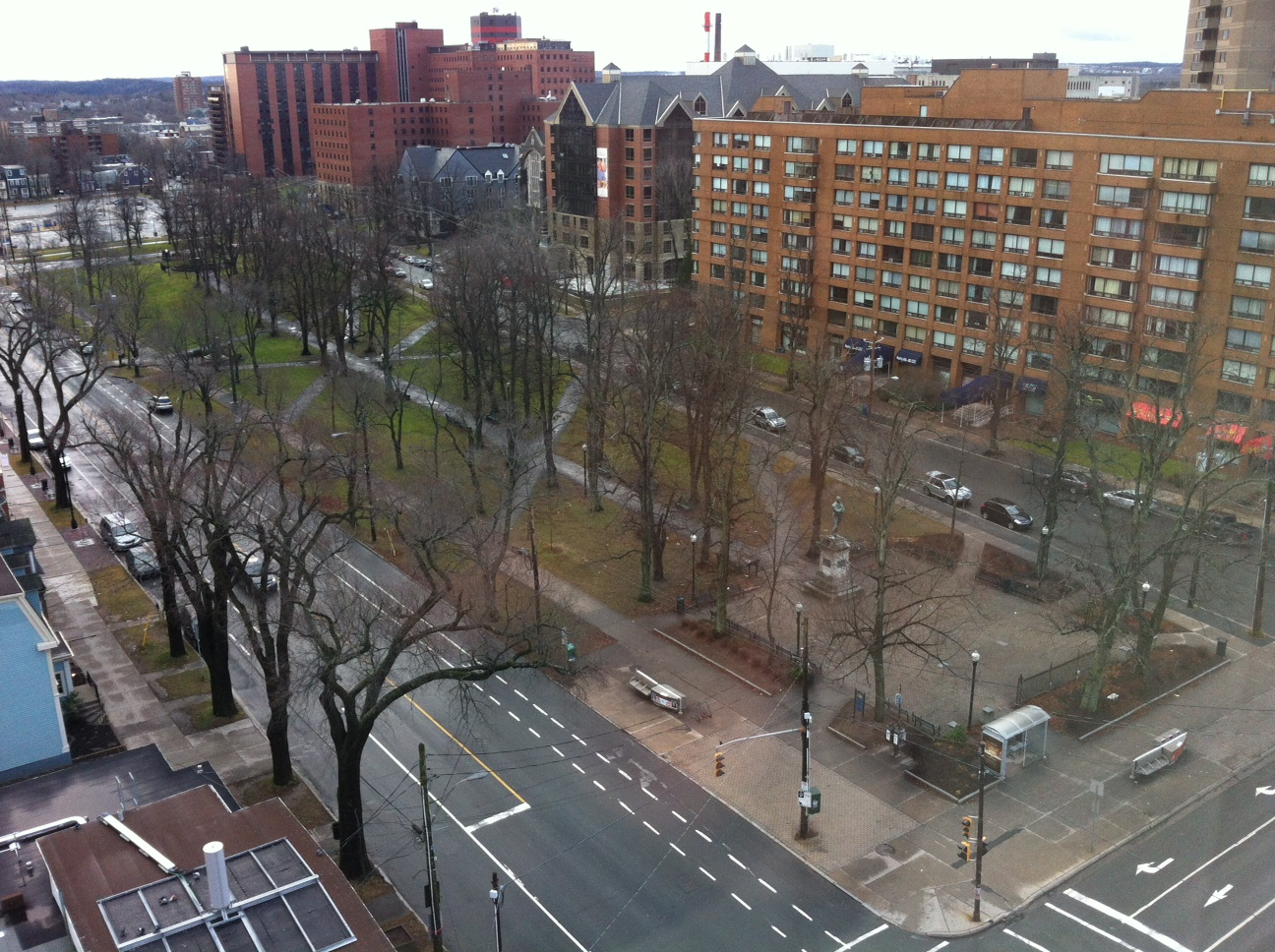
The former bike lanes on South Park Street (pictured, bottom) have been converted to segregated bikeways as part of the "AAA" bikeway network project

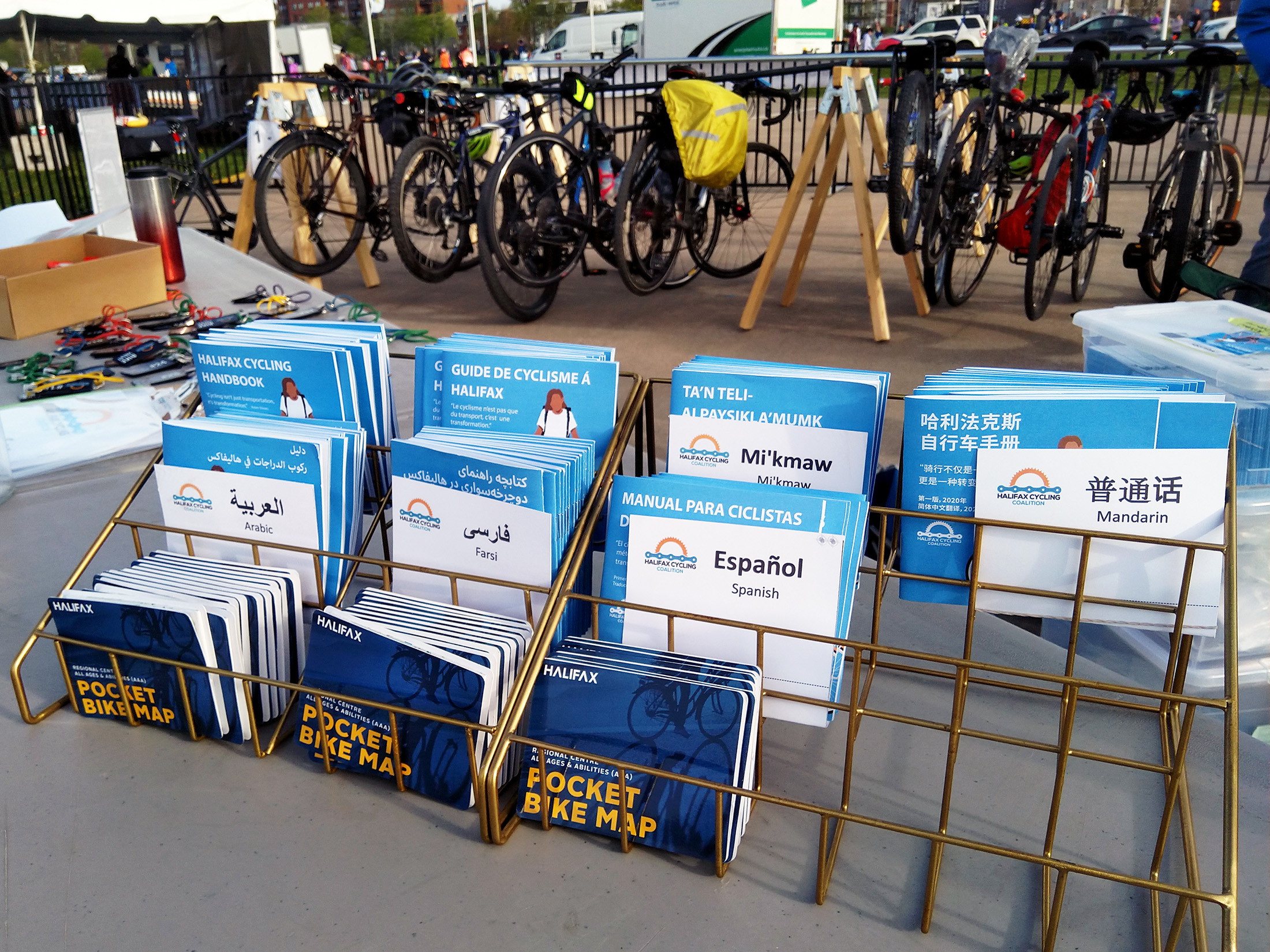
Cycling pocket maps and multilingual handbooks, produced by the Halifax municipal government and the Halifax Cycling Coalition respectively

=== History ===
Early bike lanes in Halifax include those on Bell Road, Brunswick Street, and South Park Street. The 1999 addition of a third lane to the Angus L. Macdonald Bridge also included the construction of a dedicated bikeway crossing Halifax Harbour.

The city's first bicycle plan, Blueprint for a Bicycle Friendly HRM, was approved by council in 2002. It was superseded in 2006 by the Active Transportation Plan, which was updated in 2014 (see below).

=== "AAA" bikeway network ===
In 2014, the Halifax council approved the Making Connections: 2014-19 Halifax Active Transportation Priorities Plan. The plan was developed with extensive public participation. Among respondents, the most popular concept mentioned was the construction of a bicycle network in the regional centre (defined as the Halifax peninsula and the area of Dartmouth within the Circumferential Highway). The plan identified several goals including developing a connected bicycle network, doubling the modal share of bicycles by 2026, and improving bicycle infrastructure by introducing new types of facilities such as protected bike lanes.

A 2016 survey found significant interest among Halifax residents in cycling more often, but respondents wished for greater separation from motor traffic. The city aims to capture this "latent demand" by improving cycling infrastructure and increasing the share of trips made by bicycle.

Overall transportation improvements in Halifax are guided by the Integrated Mobility Plan (IMP), which was approved by council in December 2017. As part of the IMP, the city is currently building an "all ages and abilities bikeway network" in the regional centre, commonly called the "AAA network". "All ages and ability" bicycle infrastructure is defined as facilities that are "comfortable for a wide range of cycling abilities and experience levels". Guidance on the design of this type of infrastructure is provided by organisations such as the National Association of City Transportation Officials (NACTO) and the Transportation Association of Canada (TAC).

The AAA network comprises around 57 kilometres (35 mi) of routes intended to form a comprehensive cycling network in the regional centre. About 10 kilometres (6.2 mi) of the routes already met "AAA" standard, such as the Macdonald Bridge bikeway. In addition to new cycling infrastructure, the project will include the upgrading of some existing routes. For example, conventional bike lanes on Hollis, Lower Water, and South Park streets are being upgraded to protected bikeways.

In July 2019, the project received $25 million in funding from all three levels of government. It was expected to be completed by 2022. However, as of 2022 it was only around 40 per cent complete.

== Types of cycling routes in Halifax ==
=== Bike lanes ===
Bike lanes are painted lanes designated for use by cyclists. In Halifax, these typically do not offer physical protection to cyclists. They are not considered "all ages and abilities" bicycle infrastructure.

Cyclist advocates have criticized the fact that conventional Halifax bike lanes tend to end before reaching intersections.

=== Protected bikeways ===
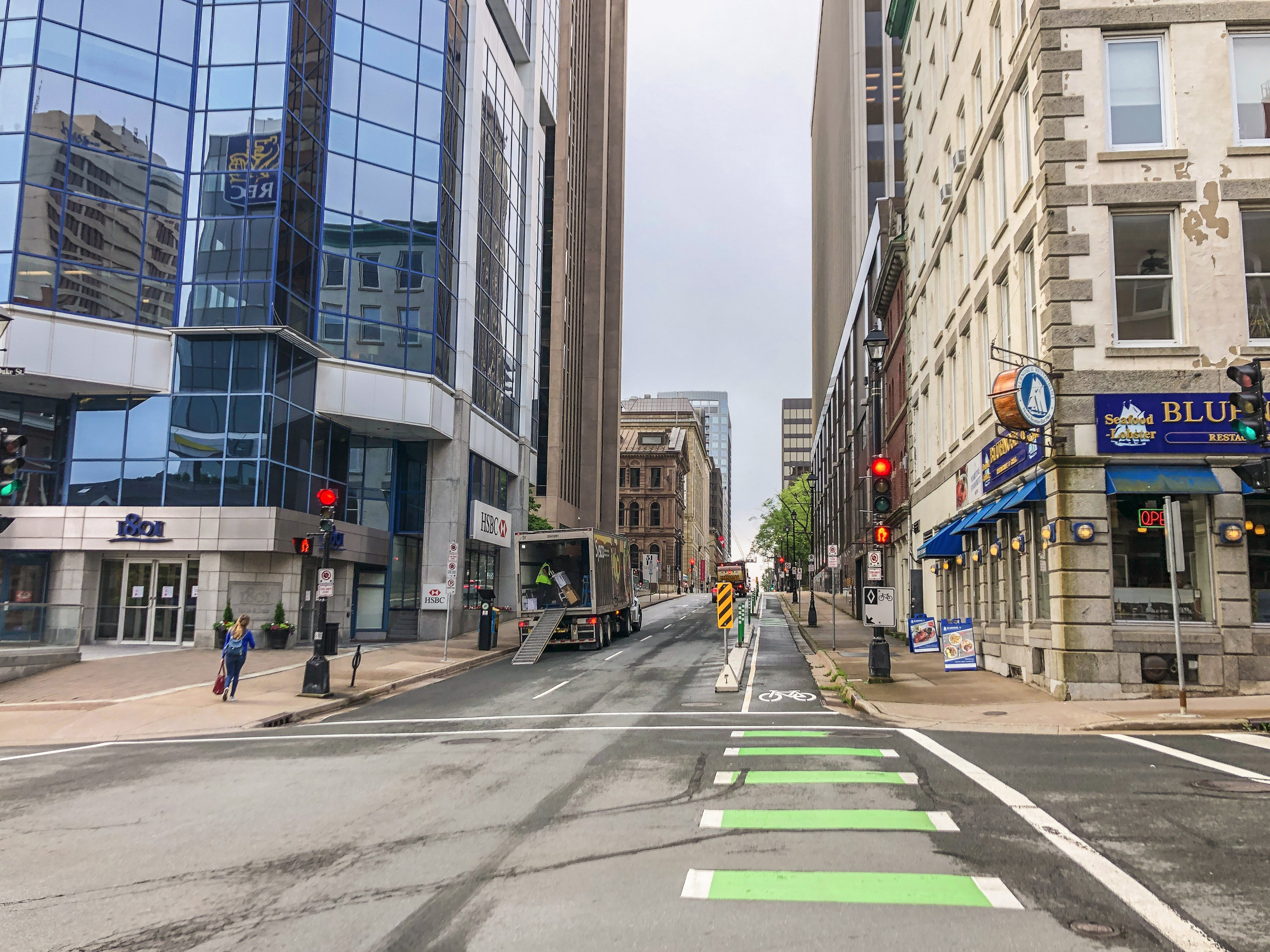
A protected bike lane on Hollis Street in Downtown Halifax

The first protected bike lane in Halifax opened as a pilot project on Rainnie Drive in 2015, as part of the redesign of the intersection at North Park Street and Cogswell Street. At that time, most of Rainnie Drive was converted to serve one-way car traffic only. The two-way bikeway is separated from the carriageway by a painted buffer and plastic bollards.

Some existing bike lanes are being upgraded to become protected bikeways. The bike lanes on South Park Street between Inglis Street and Spring Garden Road were upgraded in 2019, with plans made to extend the bikeways to Sackville Street in 2020. In 2020, the bike lanes on Hollis Street and Lower Water Street were similarly being upgraded.

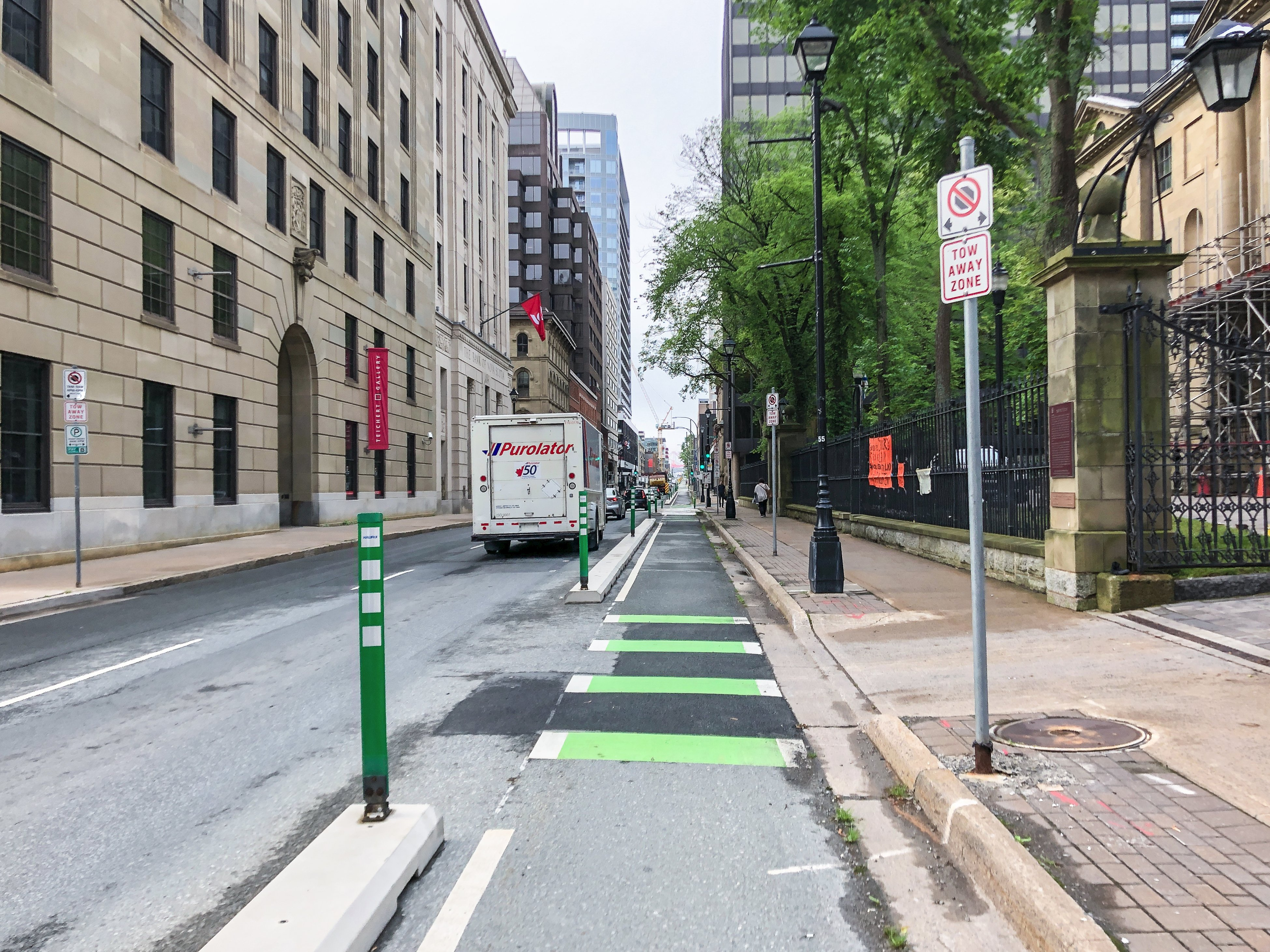
Hollis Street

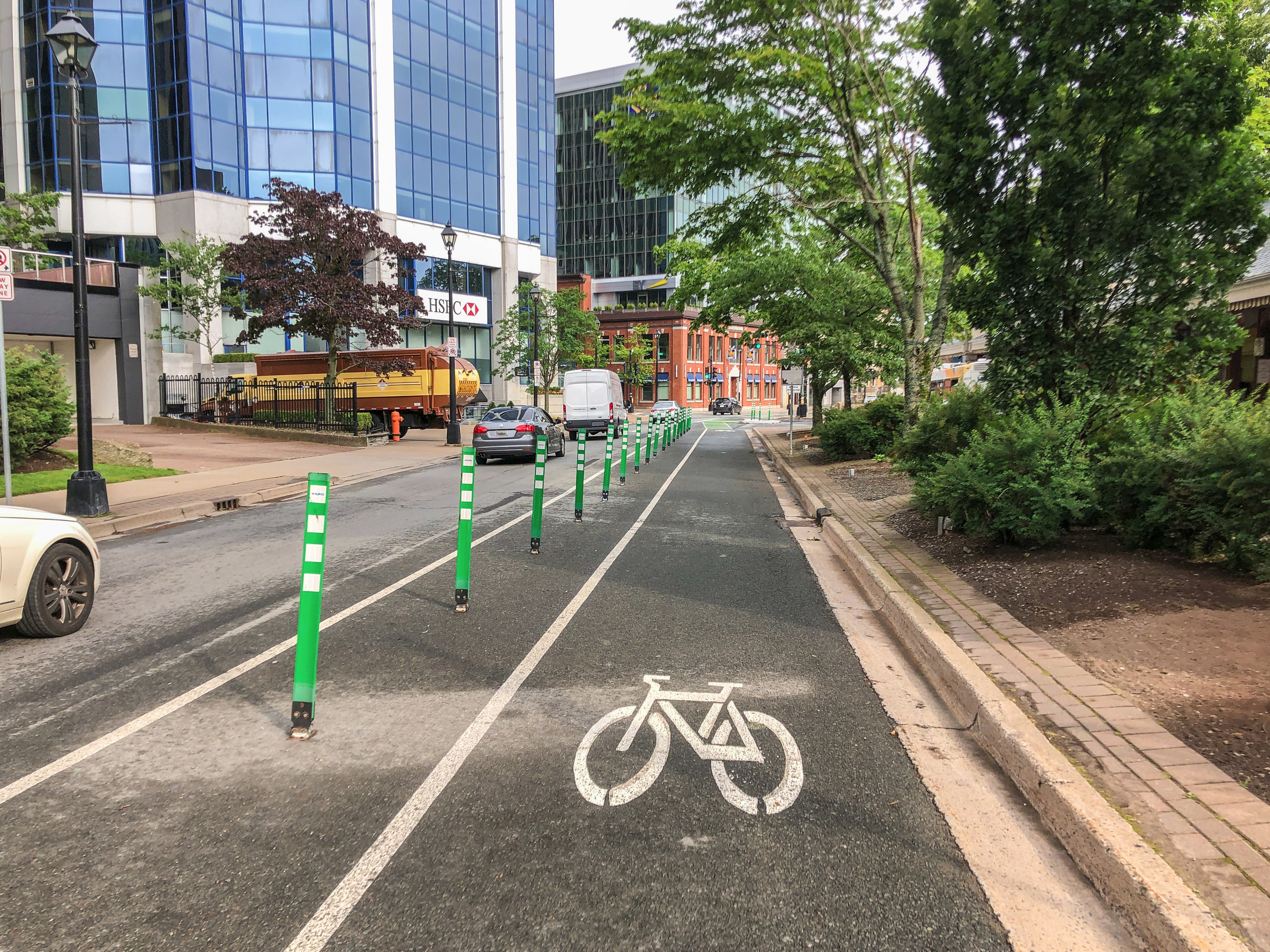
Lower Water Street

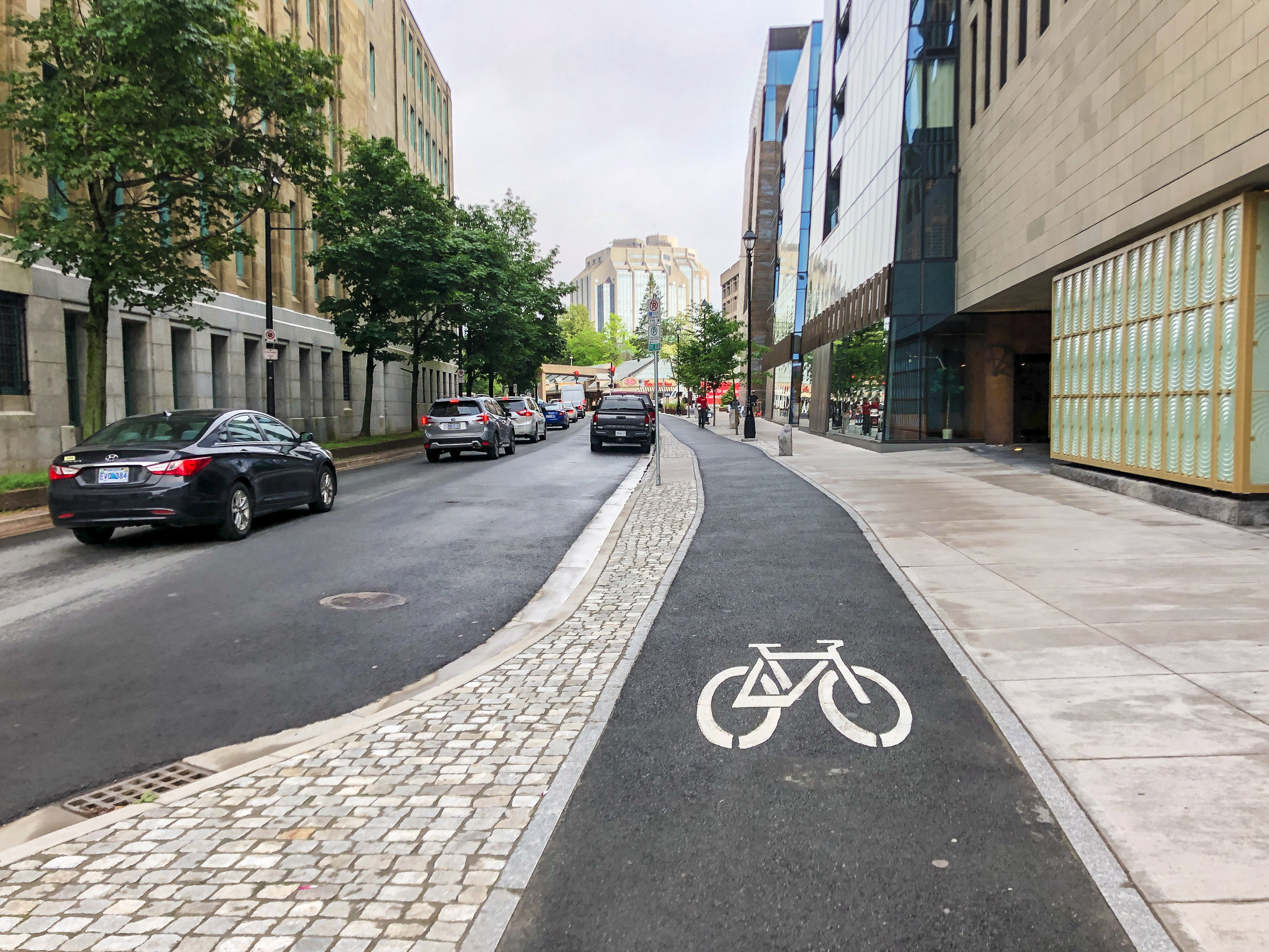
Lower Water Street

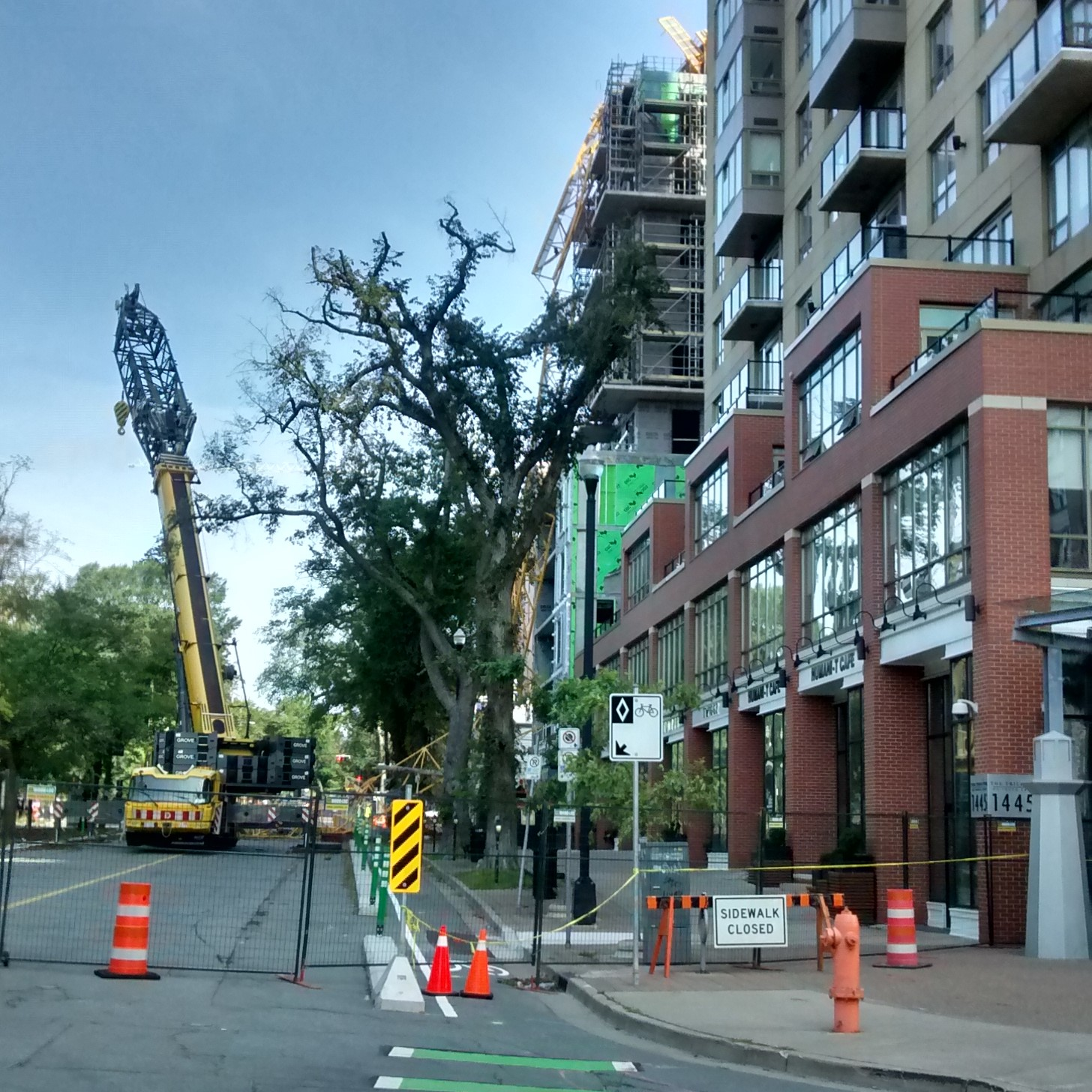
South Park Street

=== Local street bikeways ===
Local street bikeways were introduced as part of the AAA bikeway network. These are quieter, local streets considered strategic links in the cycling network. In designating a local street bikeway, various design and regulatory changes are made to improve safety and comfort for cyclists. These include:

- Pavement markings
- Wayfinding signage for cyclists
- Traffic calming treatments to reduce motor vehicle speed
- Measures to reduce motor vehicle traffic (e.g. modal filters)
- Treatments to facilitate the crossing of major intersections by cyclists
- Additional streetscape improvements and amenities

The region's first local street bikeway was constructed on Vernon and Seymour streets, connecting the Quinpool District to Dalhousie University, and linking planned segregated cycling facilities on Windsor Street and University Avenue. Various streetscape changes were made, including the addition of traffic calming measures, curb extensions at intersections, and a bicycle lane at the Quinpool Road intersection. New pedestrian/bicyclist-actuated traffic signals were also installed at the Vernon-Seymour-Coburg intersection. The first phase of this bikeway opened in 2019.

=== Multi-use pathways ===
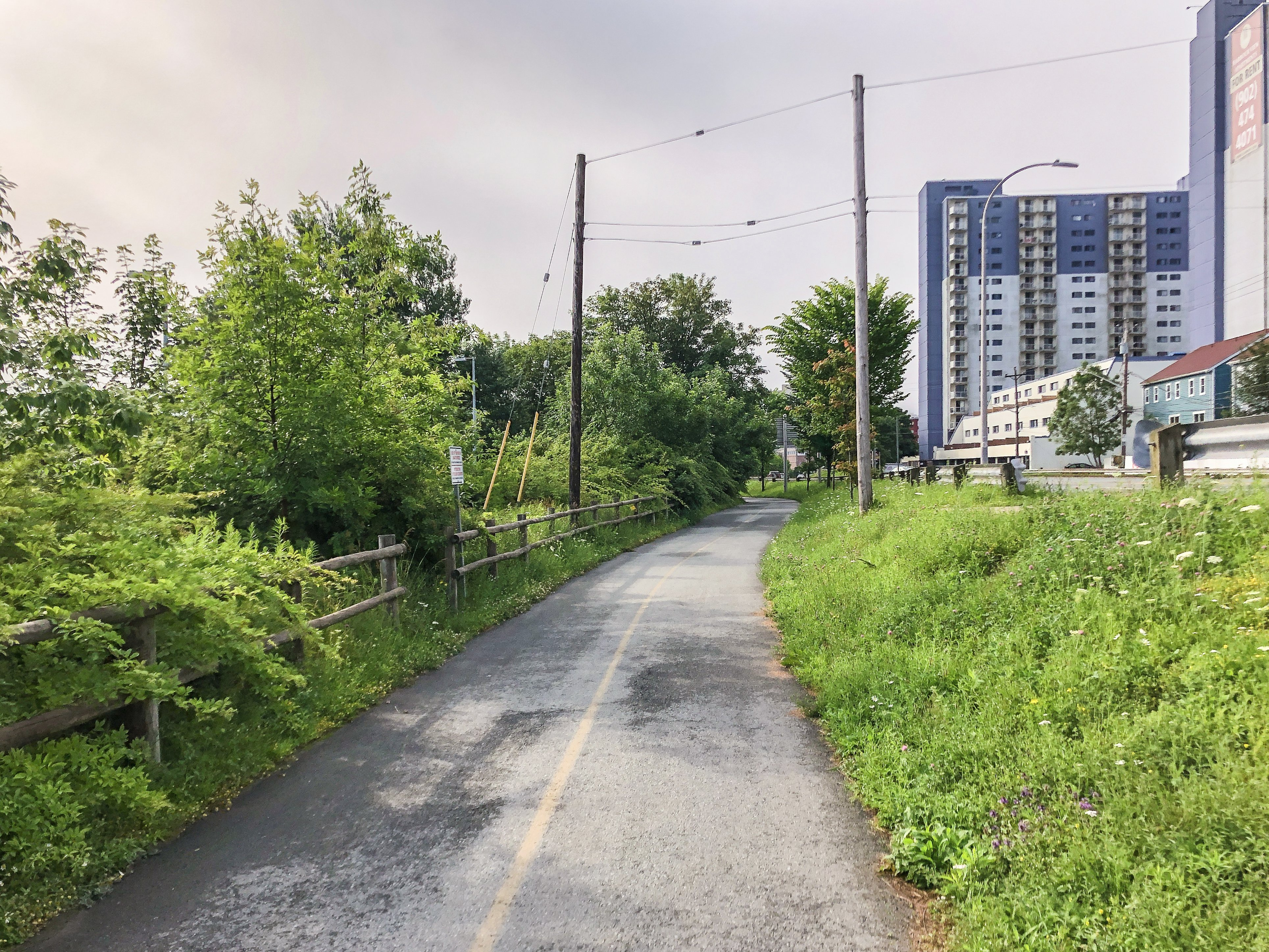
The Barrington Greenway, which connects the Macdonald Bridge to Downtown Halifax

Multi-use pathways are routes shared by cyclists and pedestrians, separated from car traffic.

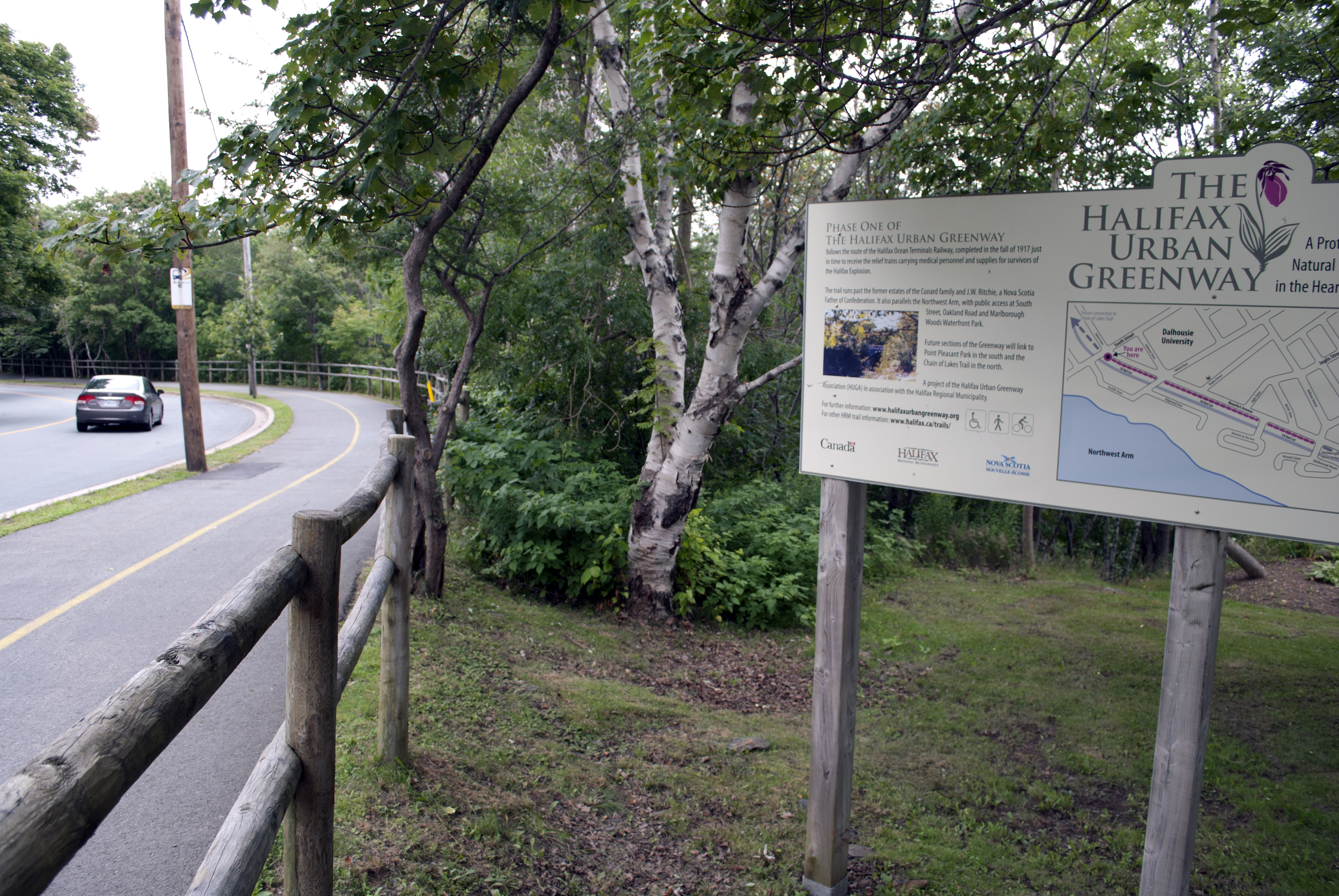
Halifax Urban Greenway

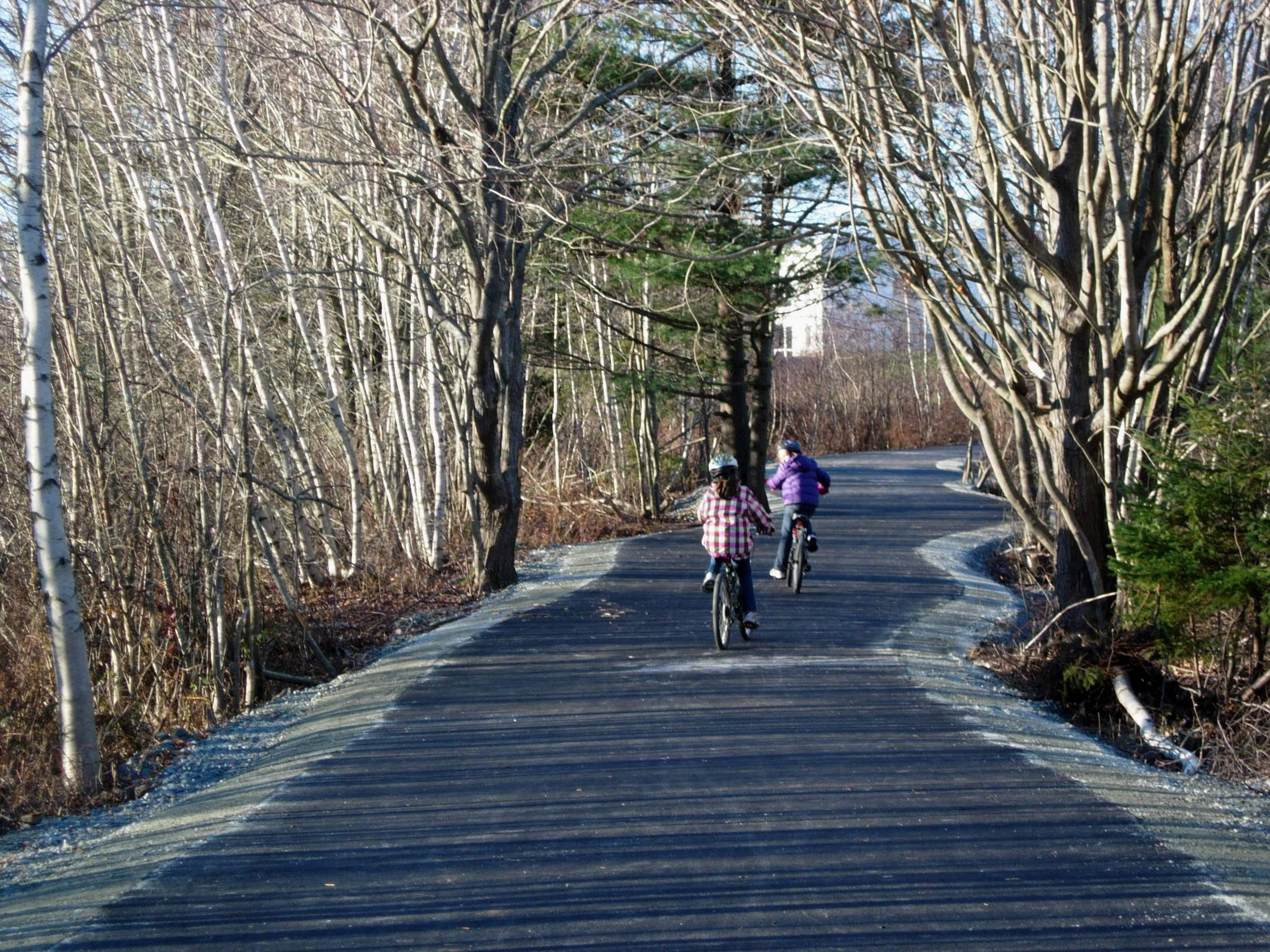
Children cycling to school on the Portland Hills Greenway

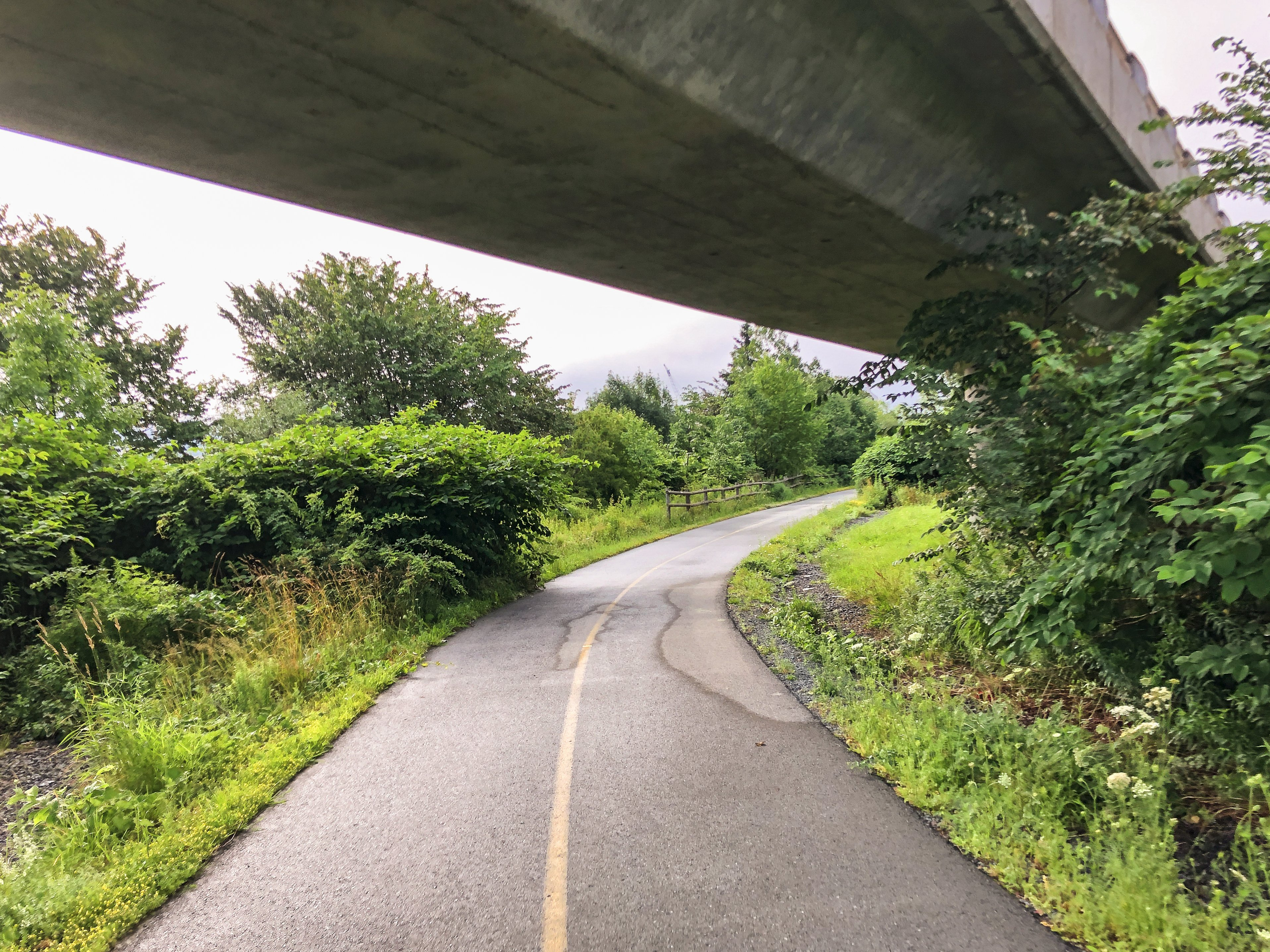
Barrington Greenway

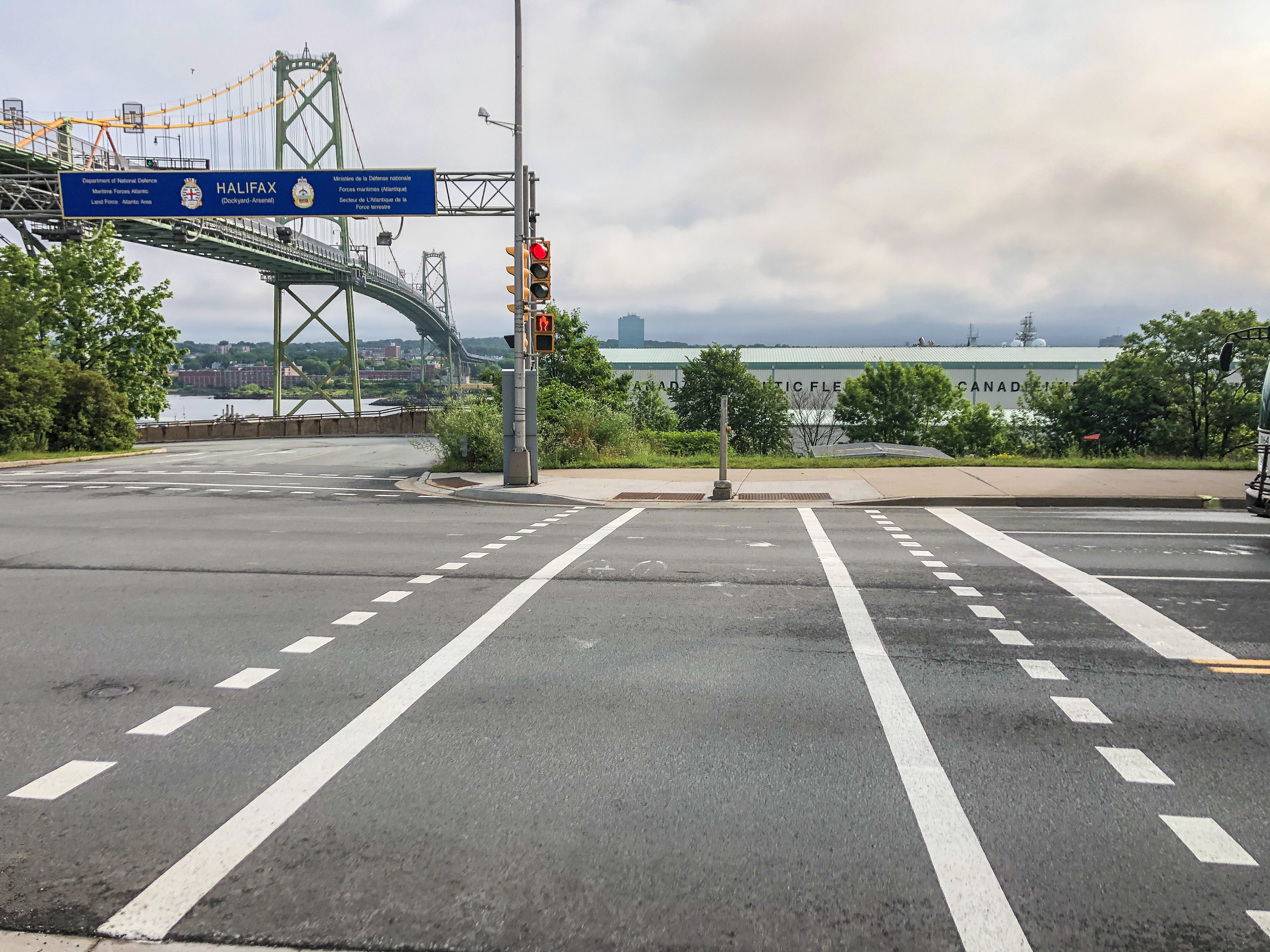
A new "crossride" (a combined pedestrian-cycle crossing) links the Macdonald Bridge to the Barrington Greenway

== Organisations and culture ==
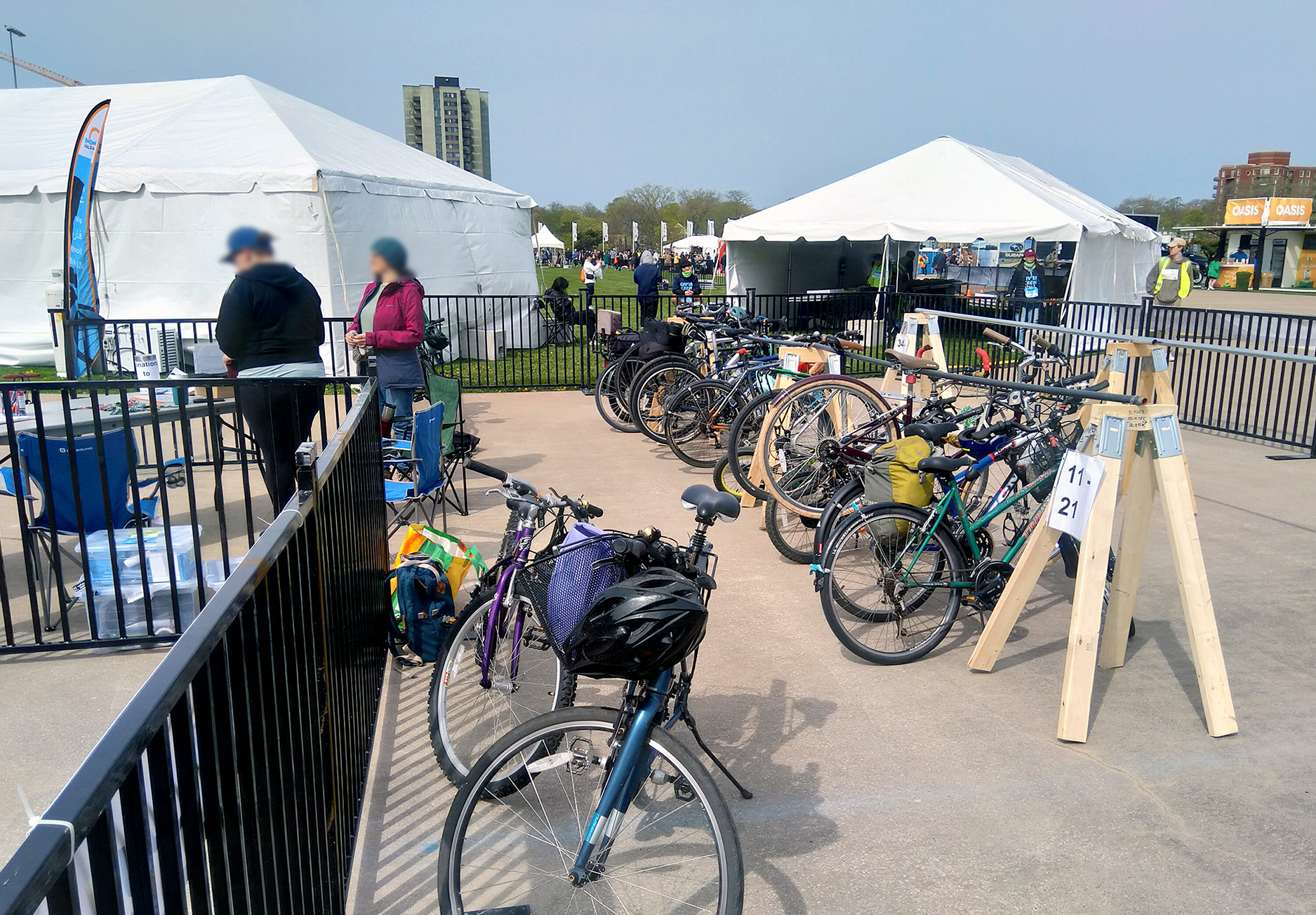
Free bike valet service at the Blue Nose Marathon (2023), operated by the Halifax Cycling Coalition

Halifax has several non-profit organisations that promote cycling in the city, including the Halifax Cycling Coalition, Bike Again (a DIY bike shop), and the Ecology Action Centre.

Critical Mass events have been held regularly for many years. One such ride, held to highlight the need for safety improvements after a cyclist was struck by a motorist and seriously injured on Purcells Cove Road, attracted several hundred cyclists in July 2022. Kidical Mass rides are also held regularly to promote safe and independent mobility for children.

The city also has a "Bicycle Mayor", an unofficial advocate for cycling culture. The international bicycle mayor network is coordinated by BYCS, an Amsterdam-based social organisation. Halifax's first bicycle mayor, Jillian Banfield, served from 2019 to 2023. The incumbent bicycle mayor is Stephen MacKay, who took over the position in May 2023.
