= Peter Nordbeck =

Peter Nordbeck may refer to:

- Peter Nordbeck (silversmith) (1789–1861)
- Peter Nordbeck (Swedish Navy officer) (born 1938)

== See also ==
- Peter Norbeck, American politician from South Dakota
