= Nordbeck =

Nordbeck is a surname. Notable people with the surname include:

- Cato Nordbeck (fl. 1965), Norwegian cyclist
- Peter Nordbeck (silversmith) (1789–1861), German silversmith
- Peter Nordbeck (born 1938), Swedish Navy vice admiral
