= Queen Elizabeth High School (Halifax, Nova Scotia) =

Coordinates: 44°38′47.7″N 63°35′21.5″W

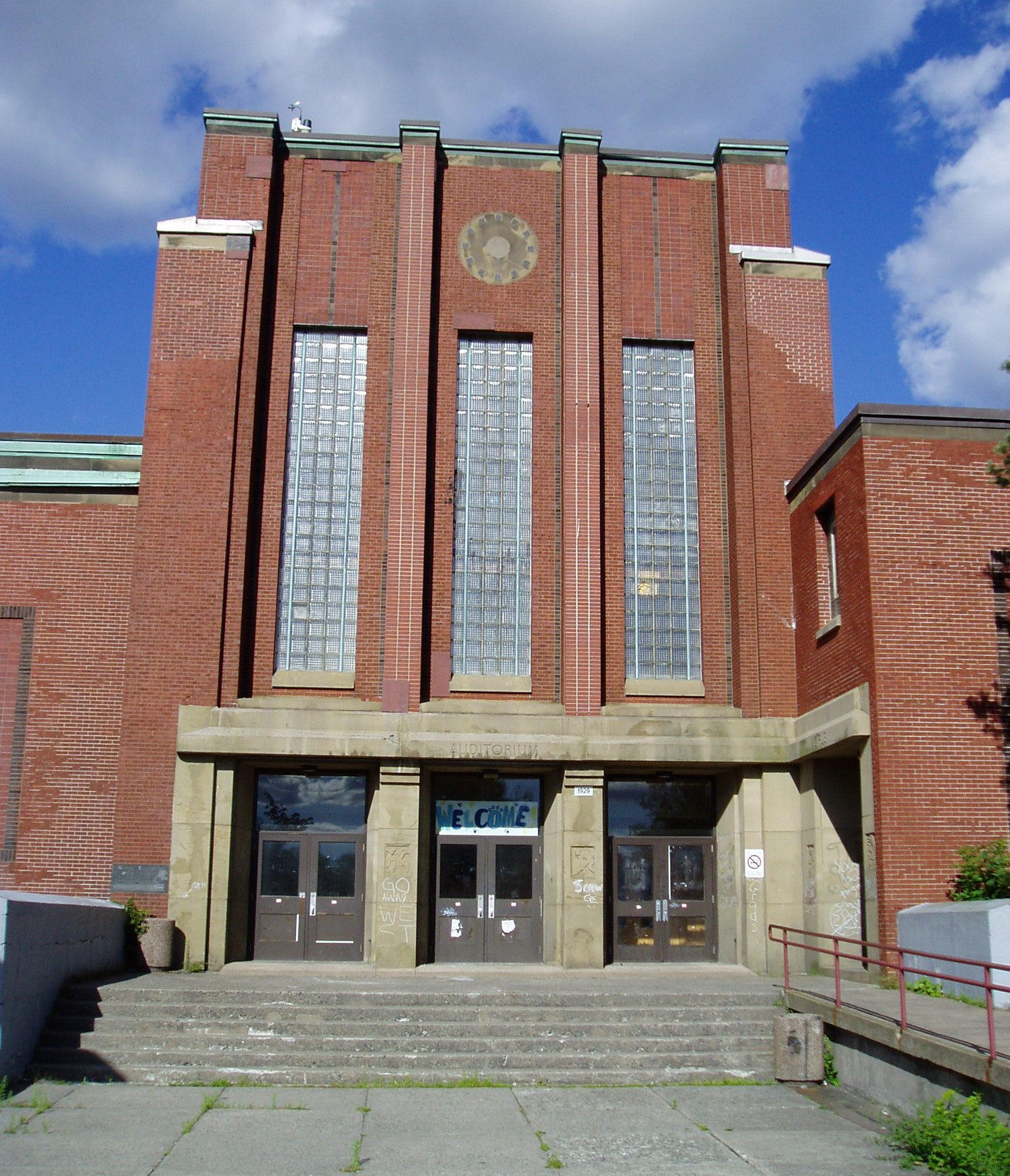

Location
- 1929 Robie Street; Halifax, Nova Scotia; Canada

Information
- Type: Public secondary
- Motto: "Facere faciendo discimus" (We Learn to Do By Doing)
- Established: September 1942
- Status: Demolished 2011
- Closed: June 2007
- School board: Halifax Regional School Board
- Grades: 10–12
- Colours: Blue and Gold
- Mascot: Lion

Queen Elizabeth High School (QEH) was a secondary school in Halifax, Nova Scotia. QEH was known for its high academic standards, competitive sports teams and distinguished extra-curricular activities such as its annual model parliament and musical productions. Its Reach for the Top team won the CBC-TV national championship in 1975.

Queen Elizabeth High School was part of the Halifax community for 65 years, and offered many services and facilities including a 1280-seat performance auditorium that opened in 1951. QEH closed in 2007, merging with longtime rival St. Patrick's High School to form Citadel High School.

== History ==
Queen Elizabeth High School was formed by a merger of two former schools, the Halifax Academy and Bloomfield High School, which were considered overcrowded and outdated. It was built during World War II on Camp Hill, facing Robie Street, and opened on 2 September 1942. The new school was named after Queen Elizabeth (popularly known after 1952 as the Queen Mother), who had visited Halifax in 1939 with King George VI.

Queen Elizabeth was registered as a designated school for children of the United States Armed Forces and Diplomatic Corps, and had a long tradition of attracting students from other parts of Canada as well as from overseas.

Live!, the first live album released by legendary Canadian rock and roll band April Wine, was recorded in the QEH auditorium in 1974.

Queen Elizabeth High School was merged with nearby St. Patrick's High School to form Citadel High School. The new school is located across the street from the former site of Queen Elizabeth, adjacent to Citadel Hill. Ground breaking for Citadel High School took place in April 2006, and the final classes at QEH finished in June 2007. Queen Elizabeth closed as the academically top-ranked high school in Nova Scotia (based on the Atlantic Institute for Market Studies annual rankings of high schools).

The building was demolished in 2011, and its former land was transferred to the province of Nova Scotia. During the demolition, workers discovered an unmarked, sealed copper time capsule behind the school's cornerstone. Opened in September 2011 at Citadel High School, the capsule contained newspapers, school planning documents, and other paraphernalia from 1941.

Over the short term, a community garden has been developed on the site and includes a walking path from Robie Street to Bell Road. In the future, the land is slated to be developed by the Nova Scotia Health Authority as an expansion to the neighbouring Queen Elizabeth II Health Sciences Centre.

Queen Elizabeth High School hosted numerous successful reunions in its history and one final reunion, the "Last Chance Reunion" took place from July 27 to 29, 2007.

== Campus ==
Queen Elizabeth High School occupied a sloping site on the corner of Bell Road and Robie Street, popularly known as the "Willow Tree" intersection. The sprawling school building, located opposite the Halifax Common and the Quinpool Road commercial district, was built in phases from the 1940s to 1960s. It had four teaching levels as well as a clock tower.

Though the school was originally planned to include a gymnasium and auditorium, construction of these facilities was deferred due to the war and a lack of funds. Work began in 1950, and the gym and auditorium were opened in 1951. Erminie was the first musical presented in the new auditorium.

The first phase of the school, as well as the subsequent gym/auditorium addition, were designed by architect C.A. Fowler (1891–1950) of Halifax.

More classrooms were added in the late 1950s, but the school remained overcrowded into the 1960s. The authorities discussed a variety of options to deal with the problem including adding another storey to the school, building a new high school in the north end, or building an extension to QEH. They finally settled on the latter option, and in February 1969 the Board of School Commissioners opened an addition along Bell Road that more than doubled the school's size.

Queen Elizabeth High School's facilities included a library, art rooms, music rooms, technology education shops, science laboratories, computer laboratories, family studies rooms, a reading resource room, a learning support centre, an ESL centre, a gymnasium, an auditorium and a full-service cafeteria – all of which were accessible to the physically challenged.

== Model parliament ==
Queen Elizabeth High School had one of the oldest-running high school model parliaments in all of North America, founded in 1952. This became one of the most prized traditions of the school and continues at Citadel High School.

=== Previous opposition leaders and prime ministers ===
- 2007: Edgar Burns (Liberal) and Zephyr Armsworthy (Conservative)
- 2005: Aaron Ingersoll (Conservative), and James Mosher (Liberal)
- 2004: Kaitlin Pianosi (Conservative) and James Mosher (Liberal)
- 1994: Neil MacFarlane (PM-Reform) and Jacob Zimmer (LO-NDP)
- 1990: Michael S. Mahon (PM Conservative) and JA Mahon Party Whip
- 1989: Brian Macdonald (PM NDP) and Heather Fitzgerald (LO Liberal)
- 1988: Derek Hall (PM NDP) and Heather Fitzgerald (LO Liberal)
- 1987: Derek Hall (PM NDP) and Karla Francis (LO Liberal)

== Athletics ==
=== Basketball ===
At the Nova Scotia high school level during the 1980s, QEH was the most dominant high school team in the province, winning several provincial titles as well as other tournaments across Canada. Bob Douglas, who has become a local basketball coaching legend, headed the team. Douglas died in 2008, but his coaching success at QEH spanned three decades and he coached or influenced perhaps most of the best players that came from Nova Scotia over that period. In the 1980s alone, the QEH Lions won four consecutive provincial titles and Douglas was officially recognized by the National Association of Basketball Coaches. The Nova Scotia high school league in general was very competitive, and by the midpoint of the 1980s, basketball had become the most popular sport for both girls and boys at the high school level.

=== Football ===
The QEH Lions football team had a storied history, and ranks amongst the most successful high school programmes in Canada. Head Coach Mike Tanner was the 1999 recipient of the NFL Canada Youth Coach of the Year Award. Tanner, a former QEH Lions player himself, also taught High School Physical Education throughout his career as head coach of the football team. Many other former Lions players also returned as coaches including Jeff Lawley, who coached defence from the 1990s until the programme was merged with that of Saint Patrick's at Citadel High. Queen Elizabeth Lions provincial football championships include:

- 2005: - QEH Lions 49 vs Cobequid Educational Centre Cougars 9
- 2004: - QEH Lions 32 vs Cobequid Educational Centre Cougars 17
- 2002: - QEH Lions 12 vs Cobequid Educational Centre Cougars 7
- 1998: - QEH Lions 39 vs Saint Patrick's High School Irish 6
- 1995: - QEH Lions 20 vs Prince Andrew High School Panthers 17
- 1994: - QEH Lions 28 vs Prince Andrew High School Panthers 0
- 1988: - QEH Lions W vs Cobequid Educational Centre Cougars L
- 1987: - QEH Lions
- 1986: - QEH Lions
- 1985: - QEH Lions
- 1983: - QEH Lions
- 1982: - QEH Lions
- 1981: - QEH Lions
- 1980: - QEH Lions
- 1978: - QEH Lions
- 1973: - QEH Lions
- 1970: - QEH Lions
- 1969: - QEH Lions

== Musicals ==
- 2007: Titanic: A New Musical
- 2006: Guys and Dolls
- 2005: My Fair Lady
- 2004: Jane Eyre
- 2003: State Fair
- 2002: Hello Dolly!
- 2000: Titanic
- 1999: The Pajama Game
- 1998: Annie
- 1997: Oklahoma!
- 1996: Faust
- 1995: Damn Yankees
- 1994: Fiddler on the Roof
- 1993: Oliver!
- 1992: Carousel
- 1989: Now Let's Revue
- 1988: Kiss Me, Kate
- 1987: My One and Only
- 1986: The Music Man
- 1985: The Pajama Game
- 1984: Guys and Dolls
- 1983: West Side Story
- 1982: Bye Bye Birdie
- 1981: Bells are Ringing
- 1980: Brigadoon
- 1979: Guys and Dolls
- 1978: South Pacific
- 1977: Irene
- 1976: Oklahoma!
- 1975: Anything Goes
- 1974: Salad Days
- 1973: The Music Man
- 1968: Get Up and Go
- 1967: Tell it to Sweeney
- 1966: Our Girls
- 1963: The Curious Savage
- 1962: The Red Mill
- 1961: The Pirates of Penzance
  The Happiest Days of Our Life
- 1960: Life With Father
- 1959: Four To Go
- 1958: Father of the Bride
- 1957: The Solid Gold Cadillac
- 1956: Robin Hood
  Time Out for Ginger
- 1955: The Winslow Boy
- 1954: The Fortune Teller
  Cheaper by the Dozen
- 1953: Martha/Julius Caesar
- 1952: The Romance of Cinderella
  The Chimes of Normandy
  You Can't Take It With You
- 1951: Erminie

== Notable alumni ==
- Rick Black – Canadian Football League (CFL) player
- Philip Bryden '71 – Alberta deputy minister of justice and deputy solicitor general
- George Elliott Clarke '78 – poet/professor
- David Crabbe – Canadian Football League player
- Melanie Doane – singer/songwriter
- Ray Downey – Olympic boxer
- Andy Fillmore '84 – former member of parliament for Halifax
- Walter Fitzgerald '54 – former mayor of Halifax and first mayor of Halifax Regional Municipality
- Nancy Garapick '79 – Olympic swimmer (Montreal 1976 - won two bronze medals)
- Jenn Grant '98 – singer/songwriter
- Rob Harris '81 – Canadian men's curling champion '04 ("Brier"), world championships bronze medal-winner '04, Canadian mixed curling champion '02
- Ron James '76 – comedian
- Labi Kousoulis '89 – Liberal MLA
- Michael Leir – High Commissioner to Australia
- Martha MacDonald '68 – economist
- Alexa McDonough – former leader of the Nova Scotia New Democratic Party (1980–1994) and New Democratic Party (1995–2003)
- Sarah McLachlan '86 – singer/songwriter
- Steve Morley '99 – former NFL football player and CFL (1st overall draft pick) offensive lineman
- Elliot Page '05 – actor (X-Men: The Last Stand and Juno)
- Roland Arthur Perry – first Chief Medical Examiner of Nova Scotia
- Ben Proudfoot - film-maker, producer - two-time Oscar winner for The Queen of Basketball and The Last Repair Shop
- Carwai Seto '91 - Halifax native, and 1988 Olympic swimmer for Taiwan, later a Princeton University swimmer, and Elementary and High School math and science teacher.
- Glenn Sarty (dropped out) – television producer
- Russell Smith '81 – author and journalist
- Wade Smith – educator
- Warren Spicer '96 – Plants and Animals member
- Jonathan Torrens '90 – actor, television personality
- Hetty van Gurp '67 – founder, Peaceful Schools International
- Tyrone Williams – National Football League and Canadian Football League player

== See also ==
- Royal eponyms in Canada

== Notes ==
References

- Queen Elizabeth High School (1993). Queen Elizabeth High School 1943–1993: 50 Years!. Halifax: Queen Elizabeth High School.
