= Nova Scotia College of Early Childhood Education =

College in Nova Scotia, Canada

Coordinates: 44.645527°N 63.595834°W

- Type: Private career college
- Established: 1970-2008 as Saint Joseph's College of Early Childhood Education; 2008-present as Nova Scotia College of Early Childhood Education
- Location: Halifax, NS, Canada
- Campus: Urban
- Website: nscece.ca

Nova Scotia College of Early Childhood Education, (NSCECE), formerly known as St. Joseph's College, is a non-profit, private career college located on Quinpool Road in Halifax, Nova Scotia, Canada. It is associated with the Private College Association of Nova Scotia, National Association of Career Colleges, and the Nova Scotia Child Care Association, accredited by the Nova Scotia Department of Community Services, and registered with the Nova Scotia Department of Education.

== History ==
Until 2008, the college was formerly known as Saint Joseph's College of Early Childhood Education. In 1970, St. Joseph’s Children’s Centre established the first Atlantic Canadian Program in Early Childhood Education. During the years to follow, the program evolved from a three-month course to a ten-month Diploma program. In order to ensure that the Diploma was current, the program evolved into what was known as St. Joseph’s College of Early Childhood Education, and was extended to a two-year course in the year 2000. In August 2008 the college changed its name to the Nova Scotia College of Early Childhood Education. The Diploma is licensed by the Nova Scotia Department of Education and approved by the Nova Scotia Department of Community Services.

NSCECE has an on site Resource Centre. This is a non-profit service organization for professionals in the child care field. This facility has a workroom and lending library and is open to members who can borrow materials for a two-week period. The Resource Centre hosts workshops and seminars on various topics of interest to professionals in the field and offers in-service training to professionals, targeting specific child care issues. The aim of the Resource Centre is to enhance the quality of child care delivery in Nova Scotia.

NSCECE operates three demonstration lab schools which provide students with observation and practicum opportunities.

NSCECE also has an on site student success counsellor available for full-time, part-time, international and ESL students.
