= Camp Hill, Halifax =

Hill in Nova Scotia, Canada

Coordinates: 44°38′42.3″N 63°35′12.7″W

Camp Hill (also, formerly, "Wind Mill Hill") is a small hill on the Halifax Peninsula, Nova Scotia. Historically, much of the hill was part of the Halifax Common, and is today home to a number of public institutions. The topography of the area has been greatly altered over time, with the construction of large hospital and high school buildings. The Camp Hill area is roughly enclosed within two city blocks; the Camp Hill Cemetery, and the block bounded by Robie Street, Summer Street, Bell Road, and Veterans Memorial Lane (originally the eastern terminus of Jubilee Road, renamed in 1999).

== Landmarks ==
=== Present ===
- QEII Health Sciences Centre, Infirmary site (originally Camp Hill Medical Centre)
  - Abbie J. Lane Memorial Building
  - Camp Hill Veterans' Memorial Building
  - Halifax Infirmary
  - Emergency & Trauma Centre
- Camp Hill Cemetery

=== Historical ===
- Reservoir
- Camp Hill Hospital
- Queen Elizabeth High School (demolished In 2011)
- CBC Television Halifax studios (demolished in 2020)
- Common Roots Urban Farm (Moved)
