= Robie Street =

Road in Halifax, Nova Scotia, Canada

Coordinates: 44°39′6.60″N 63°35′33.82″W

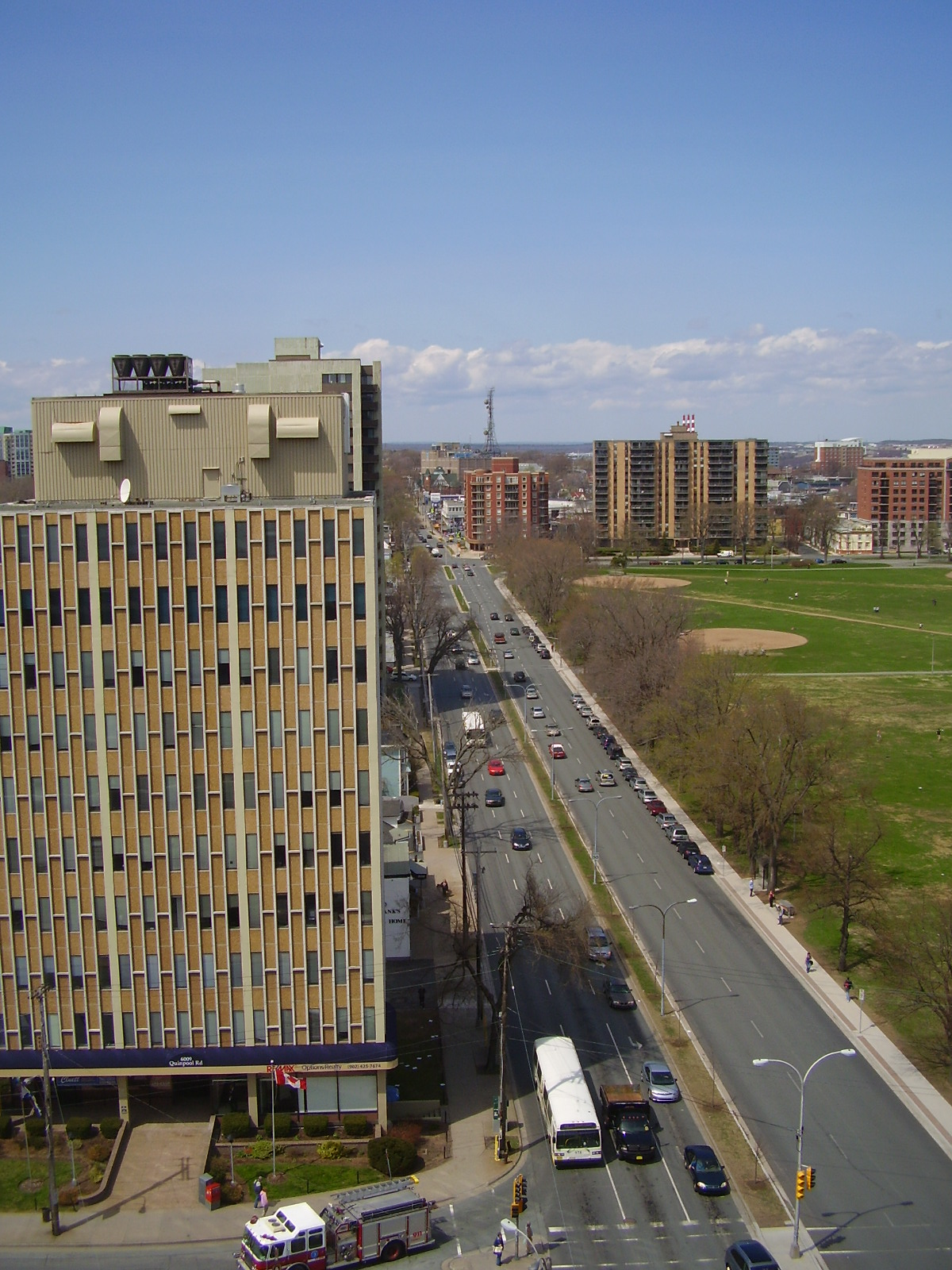
A stretch of Robie Street running north from its junction with Quinpool Road (bottom) past the Halifax Commons (right)

Robie Street is a north-south artery that runs for 7 km in the Halifax Peninsula area of the Halifax Regional Municipality (HRM) from Memorial Drive in the North End to Gorsebrook Avenue in the South End.

The street and provincial road has in most places four lanes, with a centre median from Gorsebrook Avenue to Cunard Street. From Cunard to Almon Streets, it has two lanes. From Livingstone Street to Memorial Drive, it has two lanes. From Almon Street to the MacKay Bridge ramps, it has four lanes and is undivided. In an effort to expand the HRM's bus rapid transit initiative, bus lanes were added running from Quinpool Road to Young Street in 2020.

Massachusetts Avenue (until May 21, 2007, it was and commonly still is referred to as Robie Street Extension) connects Robie Street from Livingstone Street to the MacKay Bridge. On the Halifax Peninsula street grid system, civic numbers range from 820 to 3899.

The street was named after Simon Bradstreet Robie (1770–1858), a prominent Nova Scotia judge and politician. There are also streets named after Judge Robie in Truro and Amherst, Nova Scotia.

Prior to circa 1910, Robie Street ended at North Street, with the continuation of the road to the north being part of Kempt Road and continued farther north from Young Street as Lonegard Road. At first, Robie was mainly a residential and commercial street, but in 1882, the Nova Scotia Cotton Manufacturing Company was constructed at the intersection with Almon Street, which was followed by a series of other factories and created an industrial district at the north end of Robie.

== Notable places ==
- Saint Mary's University
- Inglis Street Elementary School
- Gorsebrook Park
- Gorsebrook Junior High School
- Dalhousie University
- IWK Health Centre
- Halifax Regional Fire and Emergency Station #2 (at University Ave.)
- Nova Scotia Archives and Records Management (NSARM)
- QEII Health Sciences Centre (Camp Hill site)
- Camp Hill Cemetery
- Queen Elizabeth High School (demolished)
- Halifax Regional School Board Halifax All City Music -Adult ESL Program
- Atlantica Hotel
- The Willow Tree intersection
- Halifax Common
- CTV Atlantic and CTV 2
- Welsford Apartments
- Nova Scotia Community College Institute of Technology Campus, formerly The Nova Scotia Institute of Technology
- Highland Park Junior High School
- Halifax Regional Water Commission reservoir
- Fire Fighters Monument
- Halifax Regional Fire and Emergency Station 6
- Point North Apartments
- The George on Pepperell

== Major intersections ==
- Inglis Street
- South Street
- University Avenue
- Coburg Road
- Spring Garden Road
- Jubilee Road/Veterans Memorial Lane
- Quinpool Road/Bell Road/Cogswell Street (Willow Tree)
- Cunard Street
- North Street
- Almon Street
- Young Street
- Lady Hammond Road
- Leeds Street
