= Wheelchair basketball at the 2011 Canada Winter Games =

Wheelchair basketball at the 2011 Canada Winter Games was held at Citadel High School in Halifax.

The tournament was held between February 13 and 17, 2011. The tournament is a mix of males and females.

== Mixed ==
=== Medalists ===
Games	Gold	Silver	Bronze
Mixed	Quebec	Ontario	Saskatchewan

Key

Province qualifies for the semi-finals round are in green

=== Group A ===
Team	Pts	Pld	W	L	PF	PA	PD
Ontario	6	3	3	0	211	145	+66
Manitoba	2	3	1	2	158	169	-11
Prince Edward Island	2	3	1	2	170	180	-10
Nova Scotia	2	3	1	2	145	189	-34

February 13
17:00

Report

Nova Scotia	49–74	Ontario

Citadel High School, Halifax

February 14
9:00

Report

Manitoba	50–67	Prince Edward Island

Citadel High School, Halifax

February 14
15:00

Report

Manitoba	66–37	Nova Scotia

Citadel High School, Halifax

February 14
17:00

Report

Ontario	71–54	Prince Edward Island

Citadel High School, Halifax

February 15
11:00

Report

Manitoba	42–66	Ontario

Citadel High School, Halifax

February 15
15:00

Report

Nova Scotia	59–49	Prince Edward Island

Citadel High School, Halifax

=== Group B ===
Team	Pts	Pld	W	L	PF	PA	PD
Quebec	8	4	4	0	288	116	+172
Saskatchewan	6	4	3	1	212	186	+26
British Columbia	4	4	2	2	204	255	-51
Alberta	0	4	1	3	162	219	-57
New Brunswick	0	4	0	4	154	244	-90

February 13
11:00

Report

Alberta	56–61	British Columbia

Citadel High School, Halifax

February 13
15:00

Report

Quebec	74–34	Saskatchewan

Citadel High School, Halifax

February 13
19:00

Report

British Columbia	64–57	New Brunswick

Citadel High School, Halifax

February 14
11:00

Report

Alberta	21–66	Quebec

Citadel High School, Halifax

February 14
13:00

Report

New Brunswick	38–71	Saskatchewan

Citadel High School, Halifax

February 14
19:00

Report

British Columbia	39–90	Quebec

Citadel High School, Halifax

February 14
9:00

Report

Alberta	34–55	Saskatchewan

Citadel High School, Halifax

February 15
13:00

Report

New Brunswick	22–58	Quebec

Citadel High School, Halifax

February 15
17:00

Report

British Columbia	40–52	Saskatchewan

Citadel High School, Halifax

February 15
19:00

Report

Alberta	51–37	New Brunswick

Citadel High School, Halifax

=== Placement round ===
February 16
11:00

Report

British Columbia	48–50	Prince Edward Island

Citadel High School, Halifax

February 16
13:00

Report

Alberta	55–77	Nova Scotia

Citadel High School, Halifax

February 16
19:00

Report

Prince Edward Island	59–28	New Brunswick

Citadel High School, Halifax

February 17
11:00

Report

Nova Scotia	65–52	British Columbia

Citadel High School, Halifax

February 17
13:00

Report

Alberta	42–71	Prince Edward Island

Citadel High School, Halifax

February 17
15:00

Report

New Brunswick	46–62	Nova Scotia

Citadel High School, Halifax

=== Medal Round ===
February 16
15:00

Report

Ontario	71–45	Saskatchewan

Citadel High School, Halifax

February 16
17:00

Report

Quebec	73–47	Manitoba

Citadel High School, Halifax

=== Bronze Medal March ===
February 17
17:00

Report

Saskatchewan	58–56	Manitoba

Citadel High School, Halifax

=== Gold Medal March ===
February 17
19:00

Report

Ontario	63–77	Quebec

Citadel High School, Halifax

=== Final standings ===
Rank	Team	Record
Gold medal	Quebec	6-0
Silver medal	Ontario	4-1
Bronze medal	Saskatchewan	4-2
4	Manitoba	1-4
5	Nova Scotia	3-2
6	Prince Edward Island	3-2
7	British Columbia	2-4
8	Alberta	1-5
9	New Brunswick	0-6
