= Camp Hill Cemetery =

Cemetery in Halifax, Nova Scotia, Canada

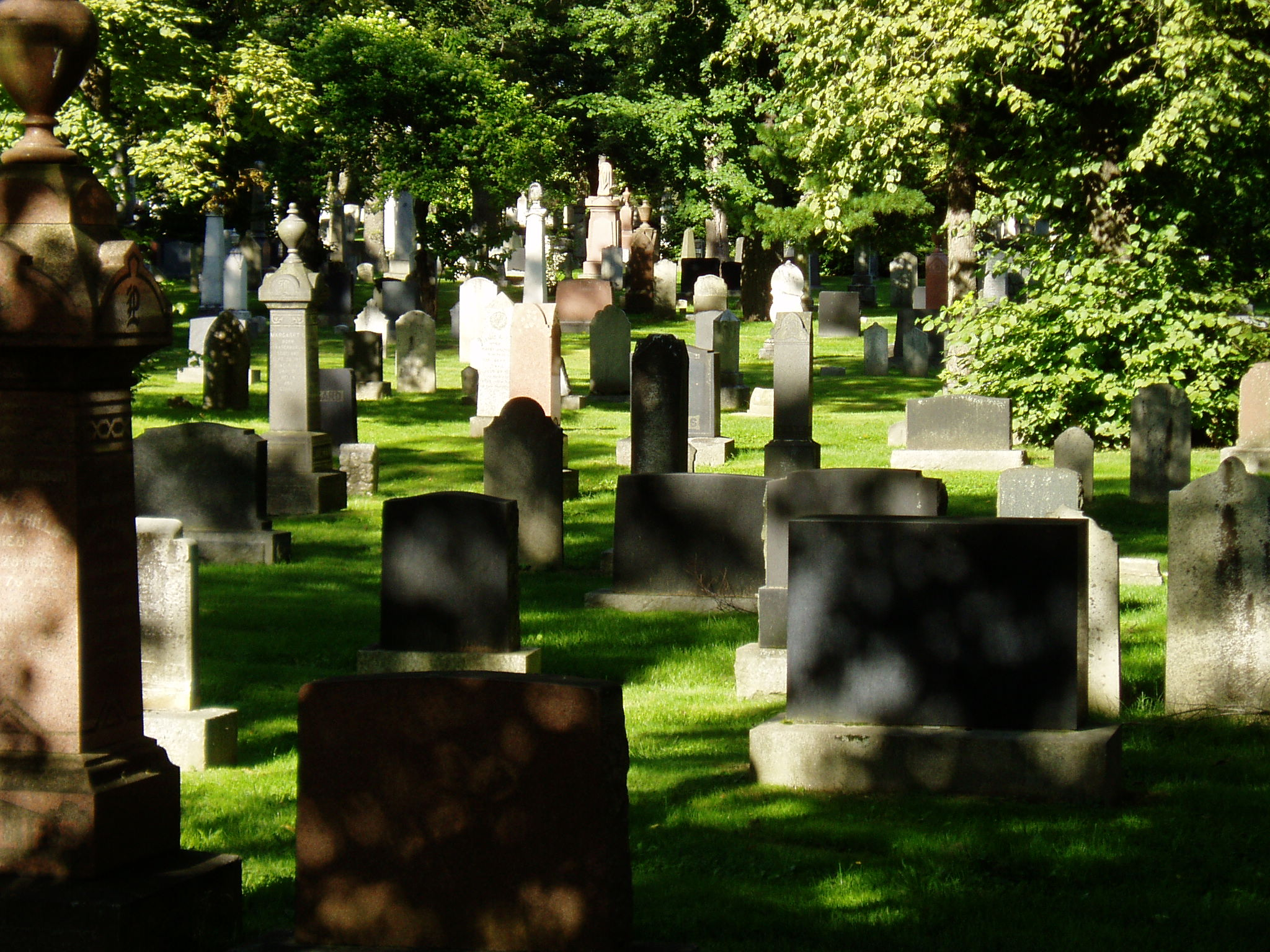
- The Camp Hill Cemetery.
- Interactive map of Camp Hill Cemetery

Details
- Established: 1844
- Location: Halifax, Nova Scotia
- Country: Canada
- Coordinates: 44°38′33.9″N 63°35′10.2″W
- Type: Public
- Owned by: Halifax Regional Municipality
- Find a Grave: Camp Hill Cemetery

Camp Hill Cemetery is a cemetery within Halifax, Nova Scotia, Canada. It is located on Camp Hill, adjacent to Robie Street.

== History ==
The city's first cemetery, the Old Burying Ground was established in 1749, growing for nearly a century until Camp Hill succeeded it in 1844. Originally run by a private company, the cemetery is now owned and administered by the Halifax Regional Municipality.

As a cemetery in the provincial capital, Camp Hill became the final resting place for many of Nova Scotia's elite. Officials allowed for the burial of Black Canadians in a segregated section of the cemetery. Initially, the resting places of African-Canadian veterans of World War I, unlike other white Canadian veterans, were marked with only flat white stones. This situation has been rectified by the federal department of Veterans Affairs.

The Commonwealth War Graves Commission maintains the war graves of 10 service personnel of World War I and over 80 of World War II.

There are also 17 graves of Norwegian sailors, soldiers and merchant seamen in Camp Hill Cemetery who died in Nova Scotia during World War II. These men were at sea when Germany invaded Norway in 1940. The King and government of Norway ordered the more than 1,000 ships at sea to go to Allied ports.

For many years the cemetery contained a traffic light. The traffic light for the intersection of Robie Street and Jubilee Road was located in the northwest corner of the cemetery, creating a popular boast that Halifax was the only city in the world with a traffic light in a cemetery. However, in 2008 the traffic light was moved outside the cemetery fence.

== Notable interments ==
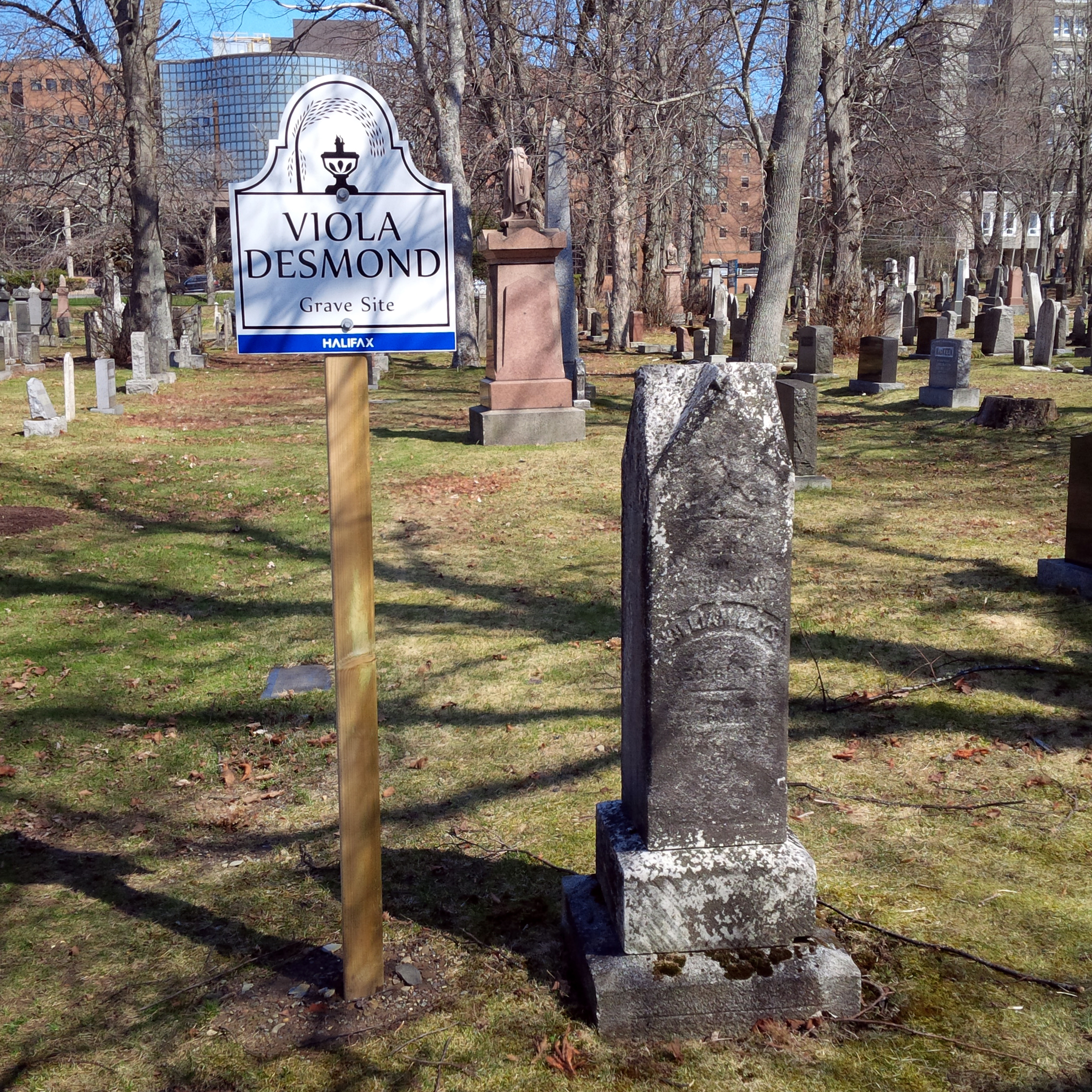
The gravesite of Viola Desmond.

- John Henry Barnstead (1845–1939), tanner and justice of the peace, coordinated the retrieval, cataloguing, and burial of RMS Titanic victims
- Enos Collins (1774–1871), privateer, merchant, banker
- Henry Hezekiah Cogswell
- Viola Desmond (1914–1965), civil rights activist, beautician
- James De Mille (1833–1880), novelist, educator
- Abraham Pineo Gesner (1797–1864), inventor of kerosene; a primary founder of the petroleum industry
- Simon Hugh Holmes (1831–1919), lawyer, journalist, politician
- Joseph Howe (1804–1873), journalist, statesman
- Alexander Keith (1795–1873), brewer, politician
- Jonathan McCully (1809–1877), educator, statesman
- Peter Nordbeck (1789–1861), silversmith and jeweller
- Harry Piers (1870–1940), museum curator, historian
- Roland Richardson (1878–1949), mathematician
- William James Stairs (1819–1906), merchant, banker, politician
- William Machin Stairs (1789–1865), Bank founder, merchant, statesman
- Robert Stanfield (1914–2003), Premier of Nova Scotia, Federal Opposition Leader; one of Canada's most respected politicians
- William Valentine (1798–1849), painter
- John Taylor Wood (1830–1904), Civil War Confederate Naval Officer, grandson of President Zachary Taylor, nephew of Confederate President Jefferson Davis
- Sir William Young (1799–1887), politician, Premier of Nova Scotia

== Gallery ==
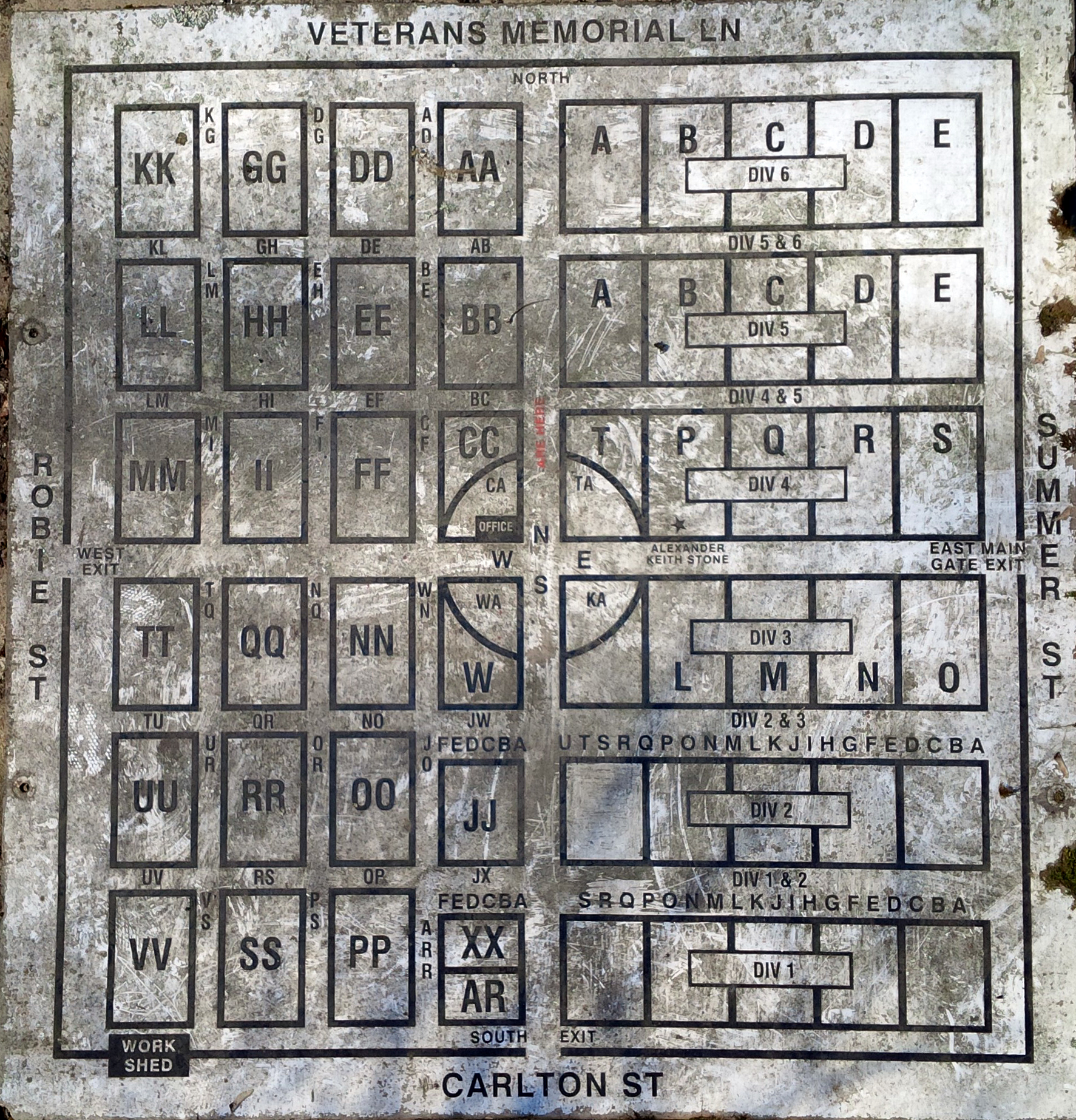
Map of Camp Hill Cemetery.

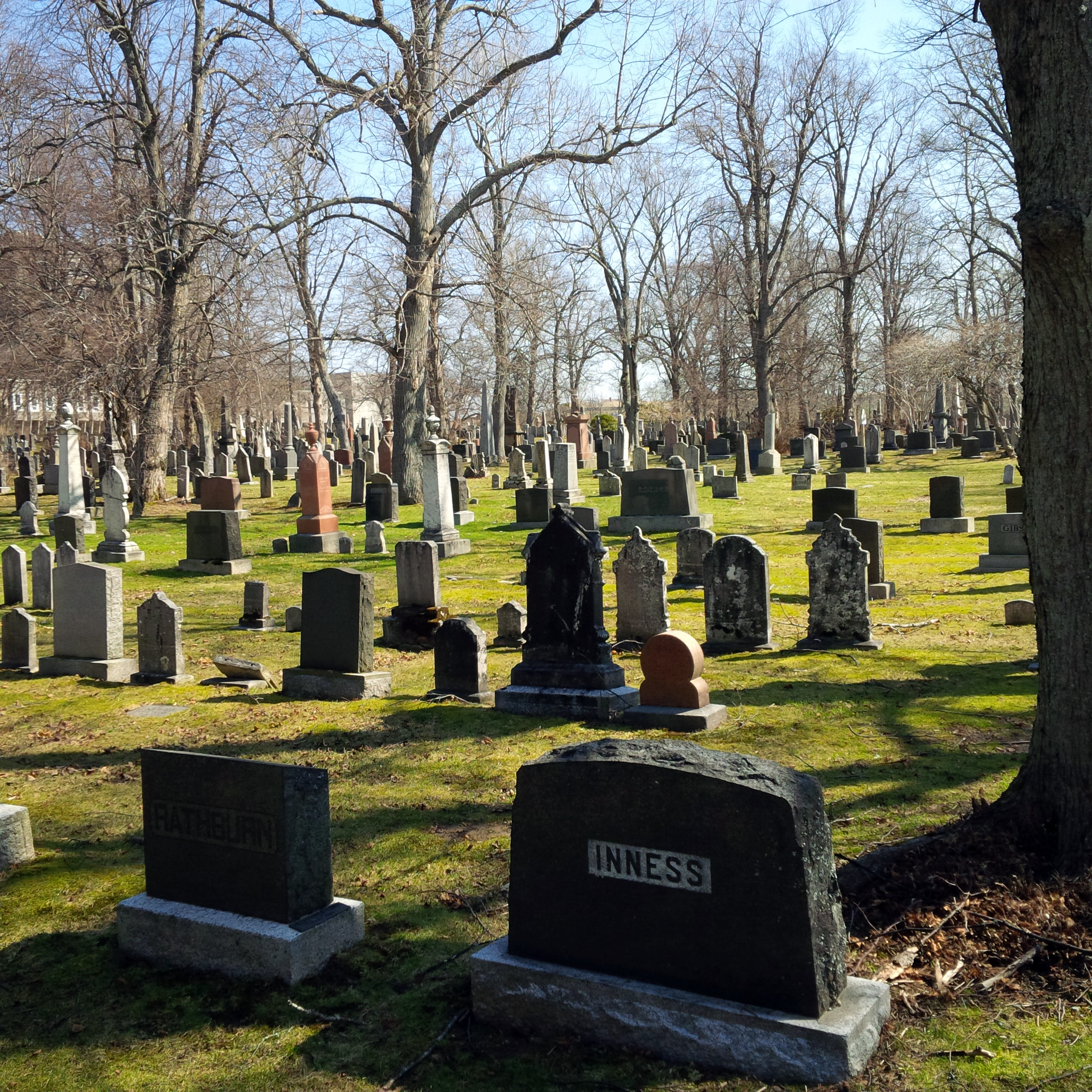
Camp Hill during the Spring.

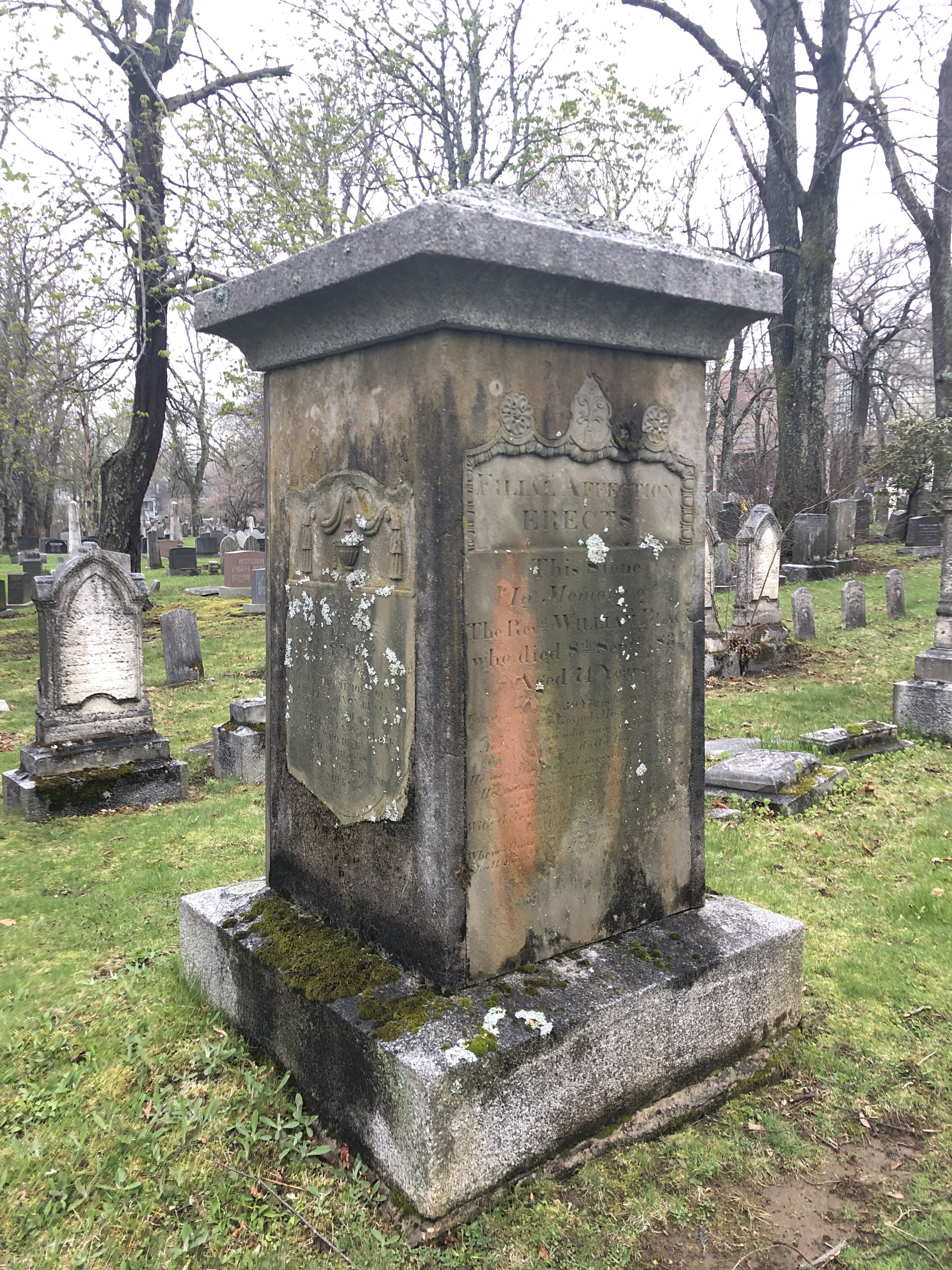
Rev. William Black (methodist)

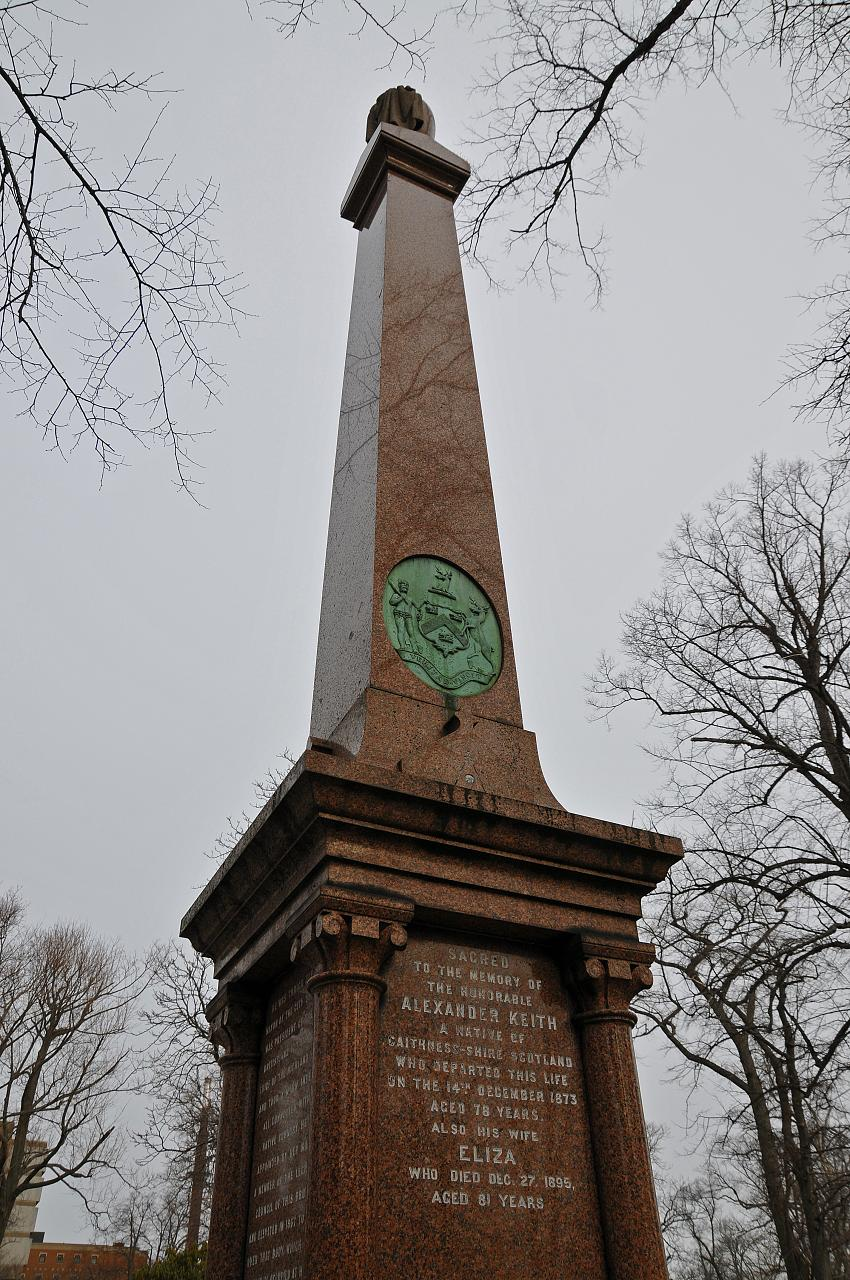
Alexander Keith (politician)

== See also ==
- Old Burying Ground (Halifax, Nova Scotia)
