= Citadel High School =

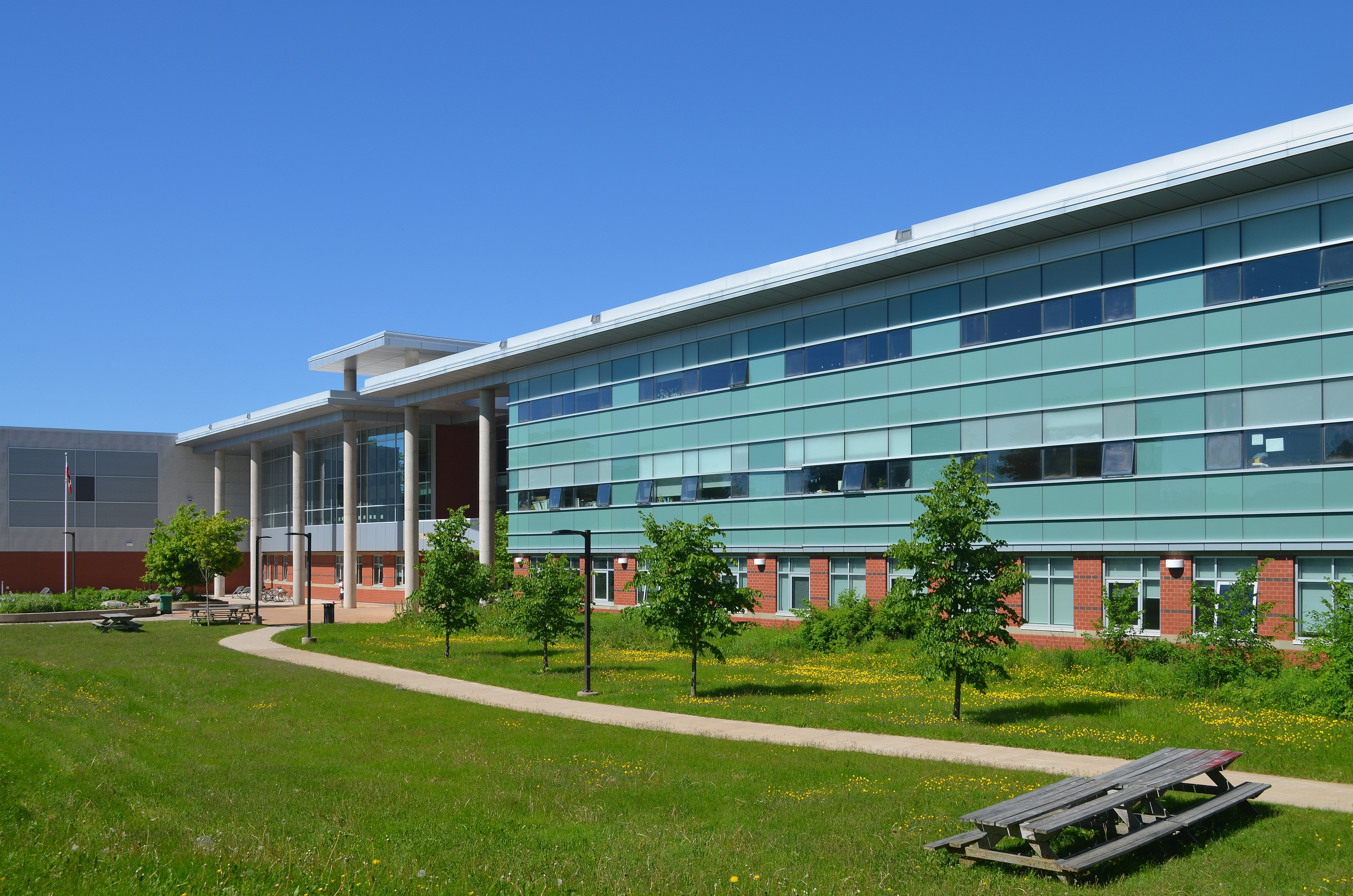

Location
- 1855 Trollope Street; Halifax, Nova Scotia, B3H 0A4; Canada; 44.647°N 63.584°W

Information
- Type: High school
- Motto: Courage, Honour, Strength
- Established: 2007; 19 years ago
- School board: Halifax Regional School Board
- Superintendent: Elwin LeRoux
- School number: 283 (HRSB), 1109 (NS)
- Principal: Joe Morrison
- Grades: 10 through 12
- Enrolment: 1,684 (2025)
- Language: English, French immersion
- Area: Peninsular Halifax
- Colours: Maroon and Gold
- Mascot: The Phoenix
- Team name: Phoenix
- Website: chs.hrce.ca

Citadel High School is a high school in Halifax, Nova Scotia, Canada.

The school opened in September 2007 on the site of the former Bell Road Campus of the Nova Scotia Community College. Its location bordering Bell Road, Trollope Street, and Ahern Avenue is adjacent to the Halifax Common and immediately west of Citadel Hill, a National Historic Site from which the school derives its name.

Citadel High School was formed from a merger of two older schools: Queen Elizabeth High School and Saint Patrick's High School (one of which was traditionally a public school, while the other was a Catholic school), opened in 1942 and 1954 respectively.

== History ==
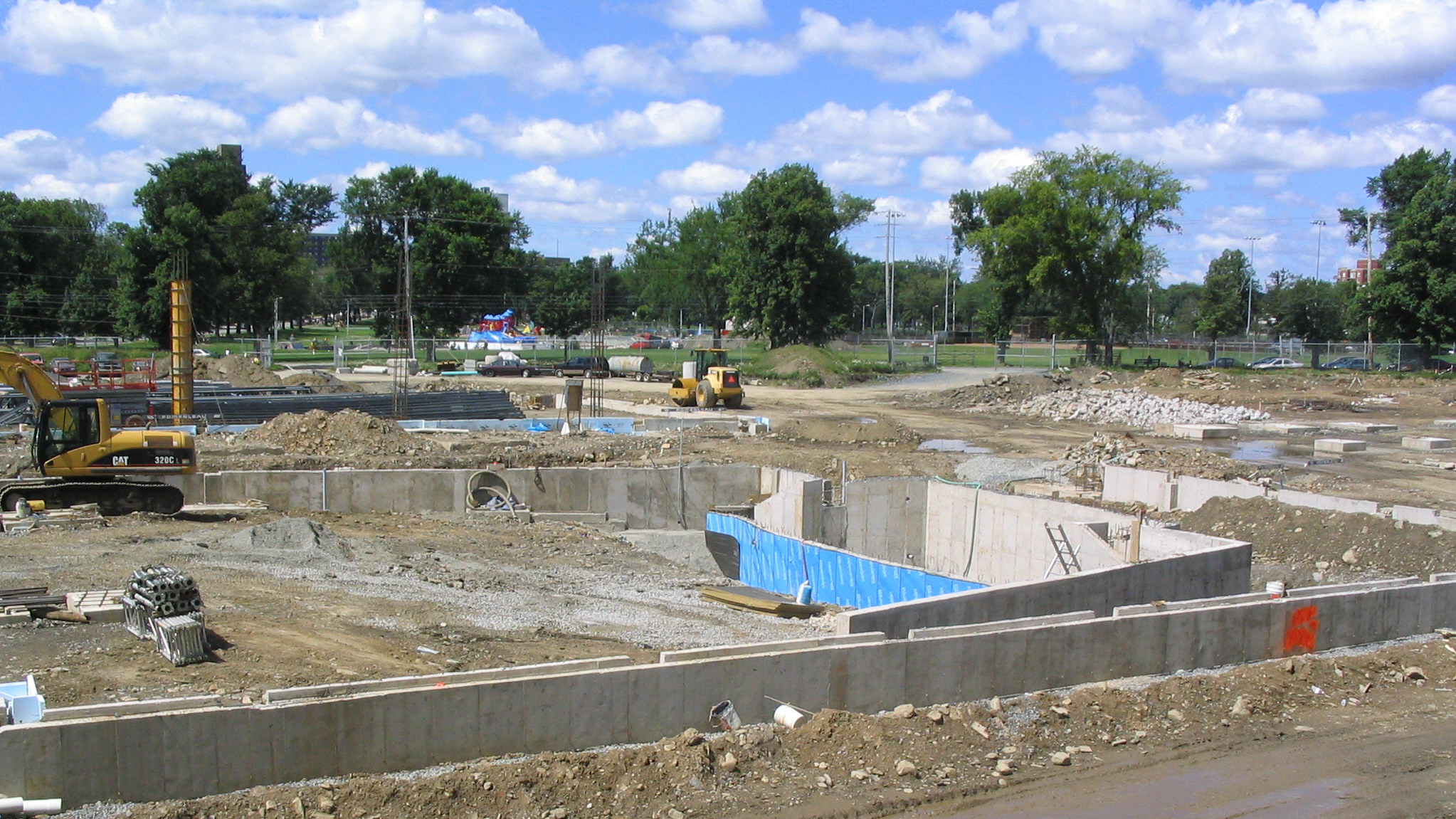
Citadel High construction site, 9 August 2006

The new school was initially announced by the Province of Nova Scotia on 12 June 2003. Designed to replace Queen Elizabeth High School and St. Patrick's High School, the school would be located on the site of the Halifax campus of the Nova Scotia Community College, which would subsequently be relocated to a new facility on the Dartmouth waterfront. On 31 March 2005, the Halifax Regional School Board announced the new name of the school, "Citadel", which was selected in a vote among other suggestions including "Halifax Central", "Willow Tree" (for the nearby traffic interchange of the same name), "Patrician Elizabethan", "Ahern Bell", "Gardens North", "Peninsula", "Garrison", as well as numerous famous Haligonians including Vince Coleman, Anna Leonowens, Robert Stanfield, Portia White, Samuel Cunard, Robert McCall, Joseph Howe, Edward Cornwallis, Richard Bulkeley, and Alexander Graham Bell.

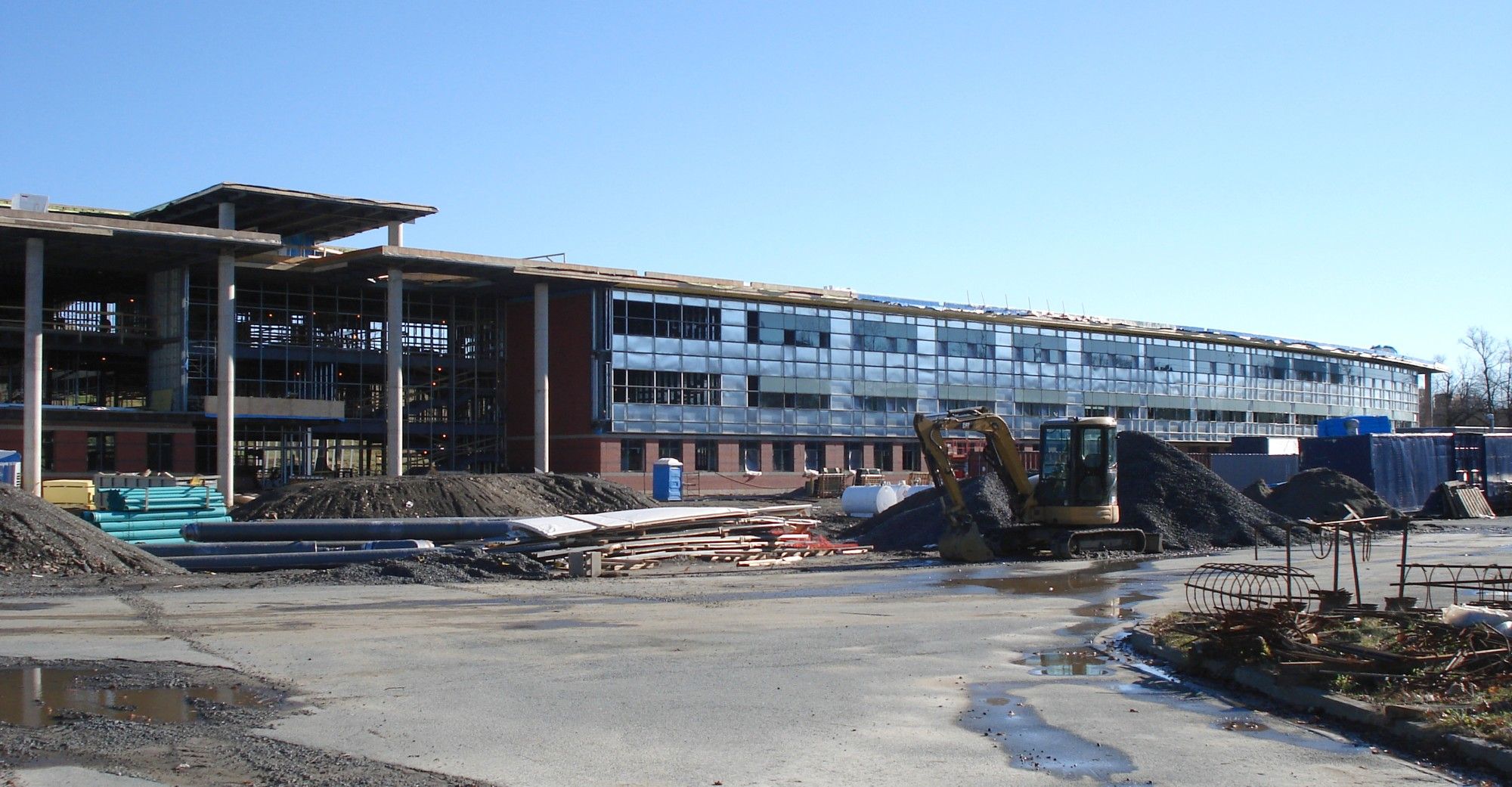
Citadel High construction site, 2 December 2006

Construction began in the Spring of 2006, following the destruction of the old community college. The school began operation in September 2007, and was officially opened by Premier Rodney MacDonald and Minister of Education Karen Casey in November of that year. The building was designed by the architectural firm of Fowler, Bauld & Mitchell, who won a design competition, and built by Pomerleau Construction.

The school contains two gymnasiums, one of which is located in the community centre section of the school, operated by the municipal recreation department. The community centre was incorporated into the project because the original school proposal did not include a second gymnasium (nor an auditorium), much to the concern of community members. The HRSB and the HRM recreation department entered into a partnership so that the two entities could share facilities: the school got its second gymnasium and the community centre has access to school classrooms on evenings and weekends. Aside from the gym, the community centre also contains dedicated activity rooms.

During the 2011 Canada Games, Citadel High served a competition venue for wheelchair basketball and table tennis. The newly opened Spatz Theatre was also used for the National Artist Program Gala.

== Academics ==
The new school offers courses for the International Baccalaureate program adding to the schools in the Halifax area that offer the IB program. Other schools in the Halifax area with the IB program are Halifax West High School, Halifax Grammar School, and Prince Andrew High School. QEH and St. Pat's offered Pre-IB courses in 2006–2007 to Grade 10 students preparing for the IB program at Citadel High.

Continuing in the tradition of the former St. Pat's, Citadel offers French immersion courses in many subjects, and through meeting certain credit requirements students may obtain the provincial French Immersion Certificate at graduation.

Uniquely, the school also promotes Nova Scotian Gaelic language studies through several courses as well as a student society called An Dùn ("the fort", in reference to the school's name). Events and concerts are held regularly. This program was introduced with help from the Department of Education amidst a renewed interest in Gaelic culture in Nova Scotia.

== Student life ==
=== Athletics ===
The school maintains opportunities for students to participate in basketball, soccer, football, cross country, volleyball, hockey, skiing, snowboarding, field hockey, badminton, rugby, baseball, softball, and track and field. The two large gymnasiums at the school are complemented by outdoor basketball courts and the numerous other sports facilities at the Halifax Common across the street.

The girls' basketball team made national headlines in March 2014 after winning their 100th consecutive game. The milestone was met in a game against Horton High School, whom they beat 59 to 50.

=== Musical productions ===
- 2026 - The Addams Family
- 2025 - Footloose
- 2024 - Mamma Mia
- 2020 – Beauty and the Beast
- 2019 – Jesus Christ Superstar
- 2018 – The Drowsy Chaperone
- 2016 – Fiddler on the Roof
- 2015 – Fame
- 2014 – Chicago
- 2013 – Urinetown
- 2012 – How to Succeed In Business Without Really Trying
- 2011 – Les Miserables
- 2010 – Cabaret
- 2009 – The Music Man
- 2008 – West Side Story

=== Student government ===
The student body of Citadel is managed by the Citadel High Students' Council.

== Facilities ==
The school contains over 60 teaching spaces: classrooms, laboratories for biology, physics, and chemistry, computer labs, a woodworking lab, family studies kitchen and sewing facilities, two art rooms, and a drama room adjoining the newly opened auditorium, the Spatz Theatre. The school is fully accessible, incorporating an elevator that was formerly installed at St. Pat's. Fire safety features include ceiling-mounted strobe lights and multiple stairwell areas of refuge on each floor that isolate themselves as fireproof doors close automatically during a fire and may only be opened from one direction.

The new school includes the 980-square-metre (10,500 sq ft) Wilson's Gymnasium, named after the Wilson Fuel Co. which made a large donation towards the completion of the school theatre. The second gymnasium, the Bob Douglas Community Gymnasium, is named after a former teacher and coach at the two predecessor high schools as well as a 1994 inductee to the Nova Scotia Sport Hall of Fame. The motion to name the gym in his honour was spearheaded by two former students. Douglas died in 2008.

The 450-square-metre (4,800 sq ft) cafeteria is called the Portia White Atrium, named after a Nova Scotian singer who achieved international fame and performed for Queen Elizabeth II, was featured on a postage stamp, and is the namesake of the Portia White Prize, awarded to established artists within the province. It is an airy, glass-clad structure that also serves as the entrance to the auditorium. It is topped by a green roof, visible from Citadel Hill.

The 280-square-metre (3,000 sq ft) school library is named after the Kinsmen, who also made a large donation towards the completion of the school auditorium. In 2007, it contained about 10,000 books as well as 15 computers available to students.

A shell was built at the time of construction for the roughed-in auditorium, which was completed in early 2011. The theatre was named the Spatz Theatre after the Spatz family, who donated money toward its completion. It was first used for the National Artist Program Gala as a part of the 2011 Canada Games.

Built-in furniture, cabinetry, wall paneling, and much of the other custom interior finishing was designed by Chandlers Millwork of Charlottetown and, in line with the school's LEED certification, does not contain urea formaldehyde, commonly used in wood products. Tables and chairs were furnished by Ven-Rez Products of Shelburne.

== Other features ==
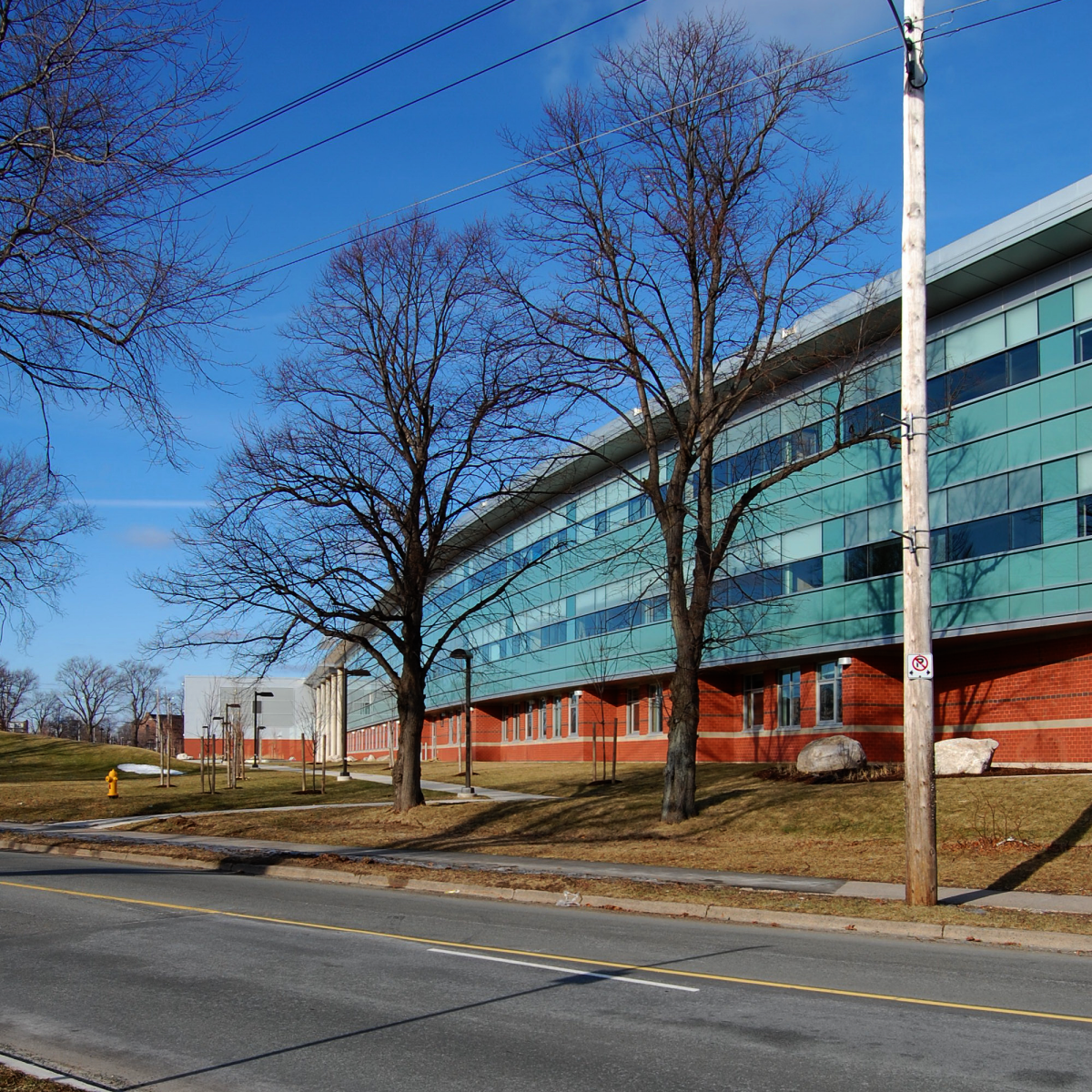
Citadel High School as seen from Bell Road.

=== Architectural vestiges ===
Citadel High School incorporates some architectural elements of the two high schools and the former community college. Six bas-relief sandstone carvings, which used to be located at the entrances of QEH, were installed in the new cafeteria. The carvings depict school-related activities such as science, sports, drama, and history. The new school also features four new sandstone carvings which were done by students of Citadel.

Sandstone banding integrated into the brickwork of the new school was salvaged from the facade of St. Pat's, which was removed earlier as the anchoring for the cladding had deteriorated and became a safety hazard. Bleacher seating from the gymnasium at St. Pat's was refinished to accommodate an additional 300 spectators in the new gymnasium. However, the old bleachers were removed in 2019 and will be replaced.

Approximately 3500 glass blocks salvaged from the former community college has become part of the wall in the gymnasium and the original wooden main entry, which includes beveled glass, has become the entrance of the new school's library.

=== Environmental sustainability ===
The school is Leadership in Energy and Environmental Design (LEED) certified. This "green building" rating system emphasizes sensible land-use, energy efficiency, and comfort. Examples of LEED elements in the project include the field sod roof of the cafeteria (a green roof), collected rainwater used for flushing toilets, waterless urinals, extensive use of construction materials with recycled content, use of Low-E glazing and a reflective white ThermoPlastic Olefin roof membrane. Low-emitting materials were used in interior fittings and furniture to improve indoor air quality.

=== Artworks ===
A 20-foot (6.1 m) tall stainless steel tree, a sculpture by Dartmouth artist Dawn MacNutt, was installed in the main foyer in early 2008. Entitled Together We Stand, it is suspended in the three-storey atrium at the axis of the building and is made of steel wiring with leaves of aluminized polyester woven in Switzerland. Works of similar construction by the same artist can be found at Alderney Landing. The piece was originally located in the lobby of the Infirmary building at the nearby Queen Elizabeth II Health Sciences Centre until renovations there necessitated its donation to the school.

The walls along the school corridors are lined with a single band of porcelain square tiles, each featuring a small drawing done in raised paint, by students of St. Pat's and QEH during the 2006–2007 school year.

== Notable people ==
- Ben Proudfoot (2008) – Academy Award winning director
- Lindell Smith (2008) – former Halifax regional councillor for District 8
- Wade Smith (school principal) – educator and coach
- Ellie Black (2013) - gymnast

== In popular culture ==
Citadel High School appears in the CBC Television sitcom Mr. D as "Xavier Academy".

== See also ==
- Halifax Central Library
- Halifax Common
- Quinpool District
- Spring Garden Road
