= East Coast Bakery =

Canadian bagel bakery

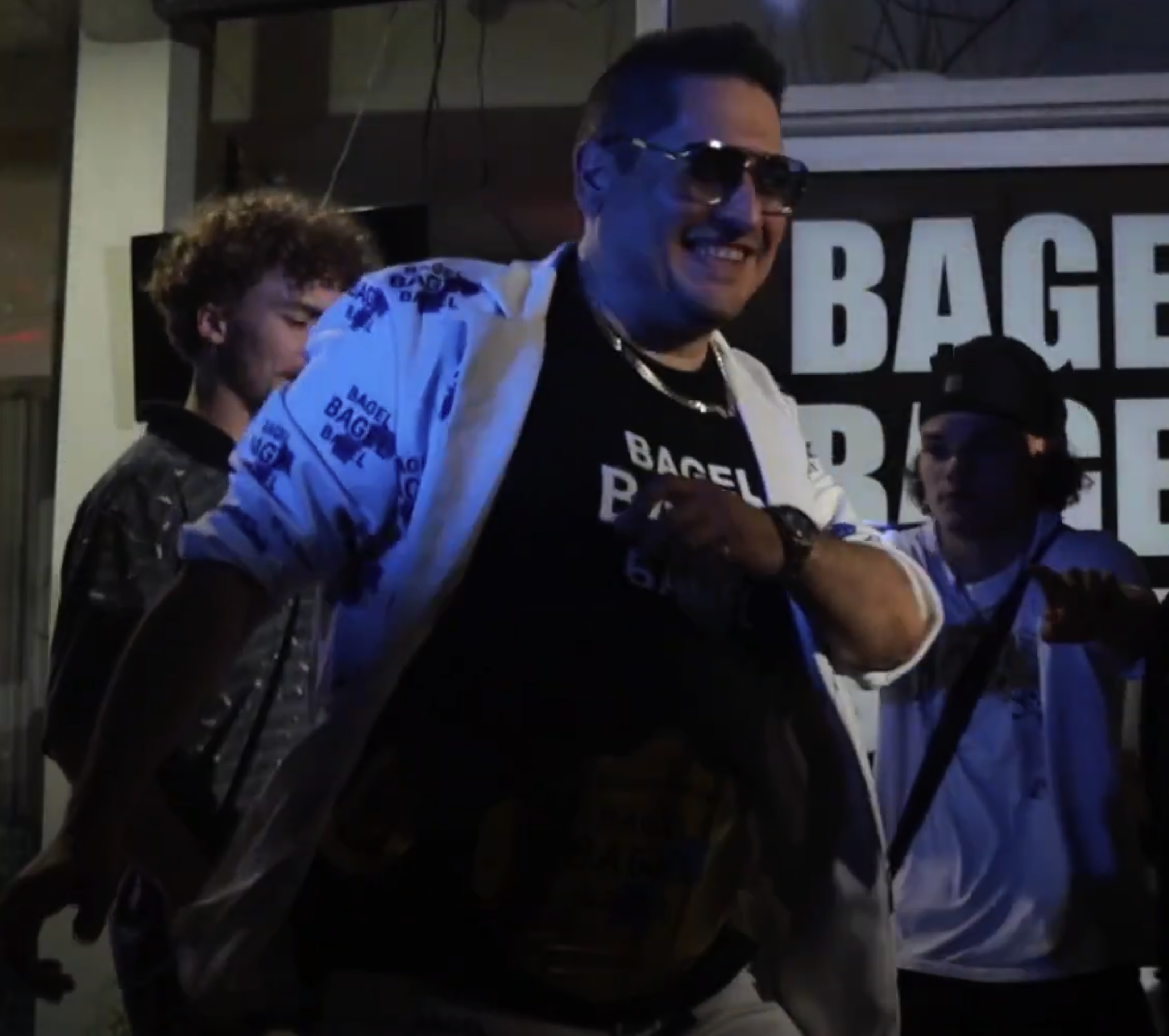
- Lonergan performing as The Bagel Guy
- Company type: Bakery
- Founded: 2014; 12 years ago
- Founder: Gerry Lonergan
- Headquarters: Halifax, Nova Scotia, Canada
- Products: Bagels; bread
- Website: eastcoastbakery.ca

East Coast Bakery is a Canadian bagel bakery located on Quinpool Road in Halifax, Nova Scotia. Founded in 2014 by Gerry Lonergan, it is the creator and sole producer of the Halifax-style bagel, a sourdough-based, honey-boiled bagel that combines elements of both New York-style and Montreal-style bagels.

== Description ==
East Coast Bakery is located at 6257 Quinpool Road in Halifax, Nova Scotia. Established in 2014 by Gerry Lonergan, the bakery offers a variety of bagels, including the Halifax-style bagel, as well as cookies, baguettes, and other baked goods. In addition to their retail sales, East Coast Bakery also supplies several cafes and restaurants in Halifax with their bread and bagels.

The bakery gained recognition through Lonergan's street performances as "The Bagel Guy," in which he promoted the bakery with choreographed dancing and sign-spinning routines.

== Halifax-style bagel ==
The Halifax-style bagel is distinguished by its lighter texture, mildly sweet-sour flavour, and use of wild sourdough cultures native to the region. The recipe uses wheat flour, honey, egg, malt, salt, and about 15% sourdough starter. East Coast Bakery hand-stretches and boils all of their bagels. Their bagels are certified kosher, making the bakery the only producer of kosher bagels in Halifax.
