= David Crabbe =

Canadian football player

No. 21
- Positions: Linebacker, Halfback

Personal information
- Born: c. 1947 (age 78–79)
- Listed height: 6 ft 2 in (1.88 m)
- Listed weight: 210 lb (95 kg)

Career information
- College: Kent State

Career history
- 1969–1972: Calgary Stampeders

Awards and highlights
- Grey Cup champion (1971)

David Crabbe (born c. 1947) was a Canadian football player who played for the Calgary Stampeders. He won the Grey Cup with them in 1971. He played college football at Kent State University in Kent, Ohio.
