= Inglis Street =

Road in Halifax, Nova Scotia, Canada

Coordinates: 44.63378°N 63.57863°W

Inglis Street is a street on the Halifax Peninsula in the Halifax Regional Municipality, Nova Scotia, Canada. It runs between Barrington Street and Beaufort Avenue. It forms the northern boundary of the campus of Saint Mary's University.

Several buses run on Inglis Street, including the 4, 10A, 10B, 10C, and 24.

== Major intersections ==
- Beaufort Avenue
- Robie Street
- Barrington Street
- Tower Road
- South Park Street
- Young Avenue

== Notable places ==
- Saint Mary's University
- Inglis Street Elementary School
