= Quinpool District =

Coordinates: 44°38′45.32″N 63°35′41.61″W

- Community
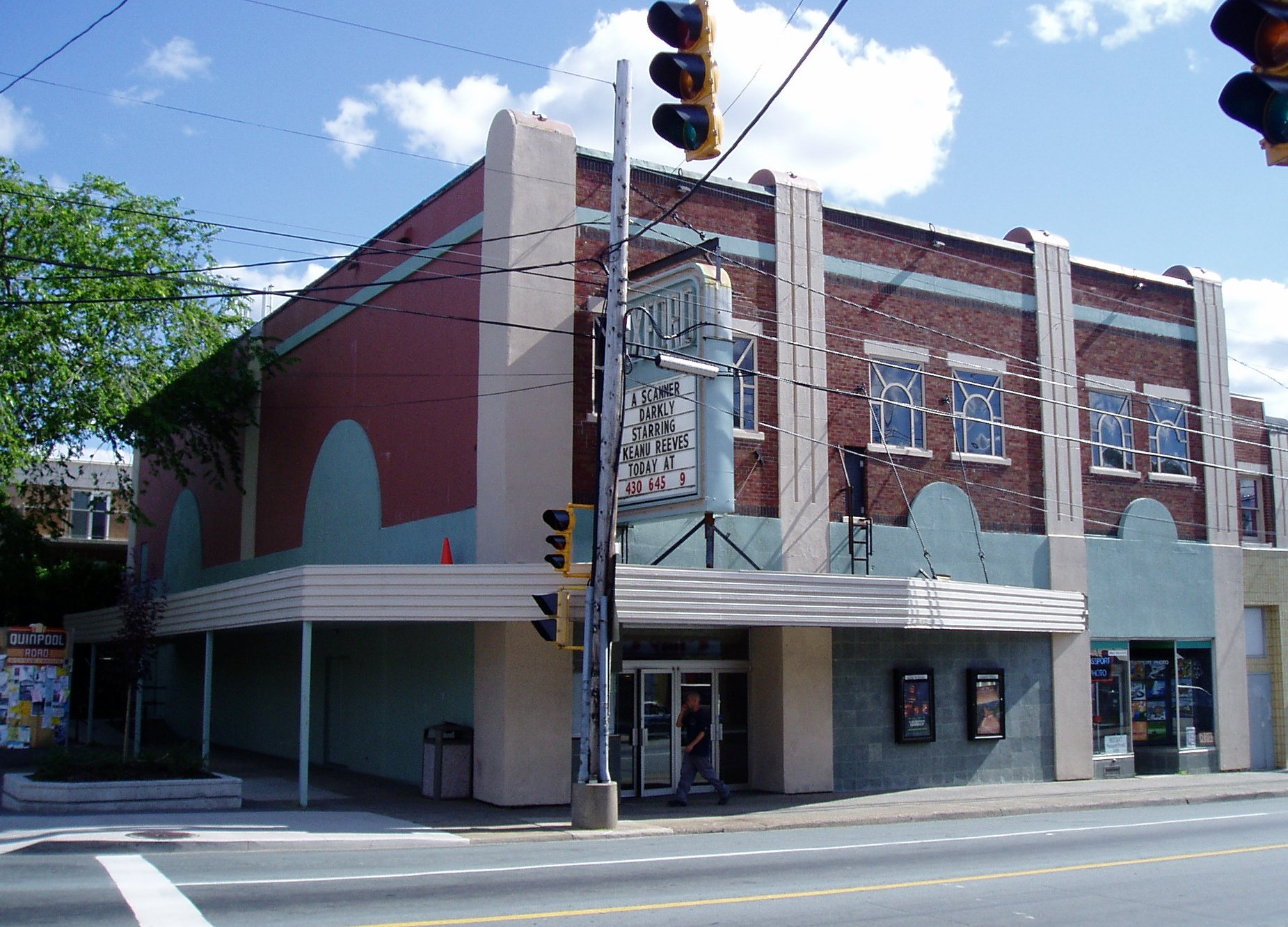
- Oxford Theatre, on Quinpool Road in the peninsula's West End
- Interactive map of Quinpool District
- Country: Canada
- Province: Nova Scotia
- Municipality: Halifax
- Community council: Halifax and West
- Municipal Districts: Halifax South Downtown, Halifax North, Halifax West Armdale

The Quinpool District refers to a commercial district of Halifax, Nova Scotia, encompassing the eastern portion of Quinpool Road as well as the streets directly north and south of it. Prominent landmarks on Quinpool Road include the Atlantica Hotel, the Oxford Theatre, and an eclectic variety of local businesses, including many popular Chinese and Greek restaurants.

Quinpool Road runs from the Armdale Rotary through Connaught Avenue, terminating at what is known as the Willow Tree, on Robie Street - an unusual five-way intersection named for the prominent tree that once grew in the median. The street is commercialised from Connaught Ave to the Willow Tree and comprises a popular shopping and dining centre for the local community. It is also part of the Nova Scotia provincial road system, meaning that the Province of Nova Scotia pays the Halifax Regional Municipality in part for snow clearing and maintenance.

While the street is an important commercial district in Halifax, it also forms a major boundary between the city's working class North End and wealthier South End, both physically and socially. Quinpool is also the heart of the city's middle class West End neighbourhood. The area was also home to two longtime rival high schools, Queen Elizabeth High School and St. Patrick's High School until their merger as Citadel High School in September 2007. St. Patrick's High School was since renamed the Quinpool Education Centre, and hosted a number of educational programs and social services. The city declared the school building surplus and it was demolished.

The name Quinpool dates from at least 1808 and is believed to come from an Irish widow named Quinn who lived by a stretch of water in the Northwest Arm known as 'Quinn's Pool'.

== Notable places ==
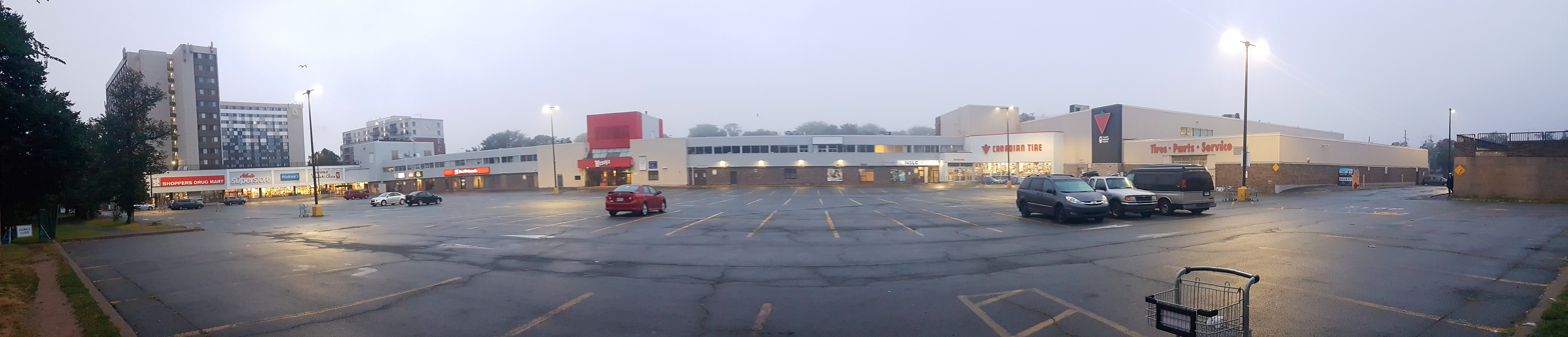
Quinpool Centre in Halifax.

- Deadman's Island Park
- Oxford Theatre (closed; converted into commercial use)
- East Coast Bakery ("Bagel Bagel Bagel")
- ProSkates
- Dilly Dally Cafe
- Ben's Bakery (closed, some buildings demolished)
- Quinpool Centre
- The Trail Shop (50+ year old outdoor store)
- Saint Patrick's High School (demolished)
- Atlantica Hotel
- Queen Elizabeth High School (demolished)
- Ardmore Tea Room
- Shaar Shalom Synagogue

== See also ==
- Life – a 1968 sculpture on Quinpool Road
