= Peter Nordbeck (silversmith) =

German silversmith (1789–1861)

Peter Nordbeck (1789 – February 7, 1861) was a silversmith born in the Holy Roman Empire. He worked in the West Indies in 1815 and moved to Halifax, Nova Scotia in 1819. Nordbeck partnered with another silversmith, Henry Mignowitz, before forming his own company. He is considered to be the most skilled local silversmith of his day. Nordbeck also trained other notable silversmiths such as Michael Septimus Brown and James J. Langford. His production included gold and silver objects for use in churches, household silver and silver trophy goblets awarded for yacht races. Nordbeck died in 1861 and is buried in Camp Hill Cemetery.

A snuffbox made by Nordbeck resides in the collection of the Victoria and Albert Museum in London. Other examples of his work can be found in the Royal Ontario Museum, the Provincial Museum of Nova Scotia and the National Gallery of Canada.

Nova Scotian artist William Valentine painted Norbeck's portrait.
