= Halifax Explosion in popular culture =

The Halifax Explosion, a disaster that occurred in Halifax, Nova Scotia, Canada, on 6 December 1917, when a French cargo ship laden with high explosives collided with Norwegian vessel, has frequently been the subject of works of popular culture.

== Film ==
The World War II-era spy movie Yellow Canary (1943) uses the Halifax Explosion as a plot device. In the movie, the character Sally Maitland assumes a public persona as a Nazi sympathizer but she is really an undercover spy for British intelligence. Insinuating herself into a Nazi spy ring in Halifax, she discovers a German plot to destroy the port, inspired by the actual events of 1917.

The short animated film "The Flying Sailor" from the National Film Board of Canada explores one person's experience of life and death during the blast, inspired by the experience of Charles Mayers, an officer blown from the deck of a ship in Halifax Harbour to land on Fort Needham Hill, injured and naked but alive. The film was nominated for an Academy Award.

The event was briefly mentioned in the 2023 Christopher Nolan Best Picture winning film Oppenheimer, where scientists discussed the explosion and how it came to be.

== Books ==
The canonical novel Barometer Rising (1941) by the Canadian writer Hugh MacLennan is set in Halifax at the time of the explosion and includes a carefully researched description of its impact on the city. Following in MacLennan's footsteps, journalist Robert MacNeil penned Burden of Desire (1992) and used the explosion as a metaphor for the social and cultural changes of the day. MacLennan and MacNeil exploit the romance genre to fictionalize the explosion, similar to the first attempt by Lieutenant-Colonel Frank McKelvey Bell, a medical officer who penned a short novella on the Halifax explosion shortly after the catastrophic event. His romance was A Romance of the Halifax Disaster (1918), a melodramatic piece that follows the love affair of a young woman and an injured soldier. There is also a young adult fictional story in the Dear Canada series, named No Safe Harbour, whose narrator tries to find the other members of her family after the blast.

Jim Lotz's The Sixth of December (1981) toys with the fictional idea that Halifax was home to a network of enemy spies during the war.

Janet Kitz wrote an acclaimed non-fiction account of the disaster, entitled Shattered City: The Halifax Explosion and the Road to Recovery (1989).

The novels Sea Glass (2002) and A Wedding in December (2005) by Anita Shreve both refer to the incident. The explosion is also referred to in some detail in John Irving's novel Until I Find You (2005) as well as Ami McKay's The Birth House (2006), in which protagonist Dora Rare travels to Halifax to offer her midwifery skills to mothers who go into labour after the explosion.

In Thomas Pynchon's 2009 novel Inherent Vice, the shadowy schooner The Golden Fang is revealed as reoutfitted Nova Scotian racing schooner Preserved, so named for being said to have survived the explosion. The novel Black Snow (2009) by Halifax journalist Jon Tattrie follows an explosion victim's search for his wife in the ruined city.

In 2011, Halifax writer Jennie Marsland published her historical romance Shattered, which is set before the explosion and in its aftermath. A play entitled Shatter by Trina Davies is set in the explosion and explores the racial profiling of German-speaking citizens after the event.

American author Katherine Arden's 2024 fantasy novel The Warm Hands of Ghosts depicts the aftermath of the Halifax Explosion, in which main character Laura Iven lost both of her parents.

The disaster is depicted in Canadian author Donna Jones Alward's 2024 historical fiction novel "When the World Fell Silent."

== Television ==
Keith Ross Leckie scripted a miniseries entitled Shattered City: The Halifax Explosion (2003), which has no relationship to the book of the same title by Janet Kitz. The miniseries follows soldier Charlie Collins through a romantic affair and his recovery from posttraumatic stress disorder. The film was panned by critics and criticized by historians for distortions and inaccuracies, including the representation of German spies in the city.

The Heritage Minute episode on the Halifax Explosion tied for the most popular in a 2012 Ipsos Reid poll. The event was also featured in an episode of Ghostly Encounters.

== Music ==
The English folk group The Longest Johns wrote a song titled "Fire & Flame" (from their 2020 album Cures What Ails Ya) that talks about the event.
