= North Street Station (Halifax, Nova Scotia) =

Coordinates: 44°39′35.9″N 63°35′19.9″W

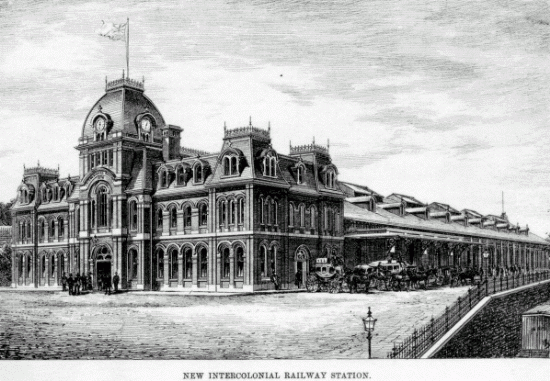
The North Street Station in 1878

The North Street Station was the railway terminal for Halifax, Nova Scotia from 1877 to 1920. It was built by the Intercolonial Railway in the North End of Halifax and was the second largest railway station in Canada when it opened in 1878. Damaged, but repaired after the Halifax Explosion, it served until the current Halifax terminal location opened as part of the Ocean Terminals project in the city's South End in 1919.

== Background ==
The first railway station in Halifax was built by the Nova Scotia Railway in 1854 at Richmond, Nova Scotia. A large wooden structure, it consisted of an enclosed train shed covering one track and platforms with series of wings for the ticket offices, waiting rooms and a lunch room and saloon. The station was functional and without ornamentation as well as inconveniently located two miles from downtown Halifax, connected by a horse-drawn street railway. After Confederation in 1867, the Nova Scotia Railway was taken over by the Government of Canada and became part of the Intercolonial Railway. In 1873, the Intercolonial made plans for a large new landmark station worthy of their eastern terminus.

== Construction ==
The new station was located much closer to downtown at the corner of North Street and Barrington Street thanks to negotiations between the Canadian Government and the British Royal Navy whose Halifax Dockyard had blocked the railway's extension into downtown. The new station was the second largest in Canada when built, exceeded only by Toronto's Union Station. The layout of the new Halifax station was designed by the Intercolonial's Chief Engineer Alexander McNab. The architectural details and working plans were drawn up architects Andrew Dewar and David Stirling, who also designed the Provincial Building and St. David's Presbyterian Church on Grafton Street. The station was built by the construction firm of Henry Peters.

The station followed the Second Empire architectural style with a mansard roof, a large central clock tower and elaborately decorated dormers. The main station structure was 113' x 50' with walls of decorated pressed brick rising from a granite base. The first floor contained a general waiting room, a ladies’ waiting room (fitted with plush seats, a marble fireplace and a separate ticket office), a reading room as well as ticket offices for the Intercolonial Railway and the Windsor and Annapolis Railway as well as offices for the station master and passenger superintendent. The second floor contained more railway offices and a balcony where railway officials could observe operations in the large glass-covered passenger shed, the second glass railway canopy built in Canada. The shed was 400' by 87' and contained five enclosed tracks and platforms. A sixth track on the west side outside the shed was used for private railway cars where the rich could disembark in privacy and hook their private cars up to steam heating from the station. The glass roof was supported by a canopy of 24 iron trusses. Extensive iron awnings sheltered express wagons on the east side and passenger cabs on the North Street side. A covered and heated staircase led from the station up to Barrington Street's sidewalks and streetcars. The ocean liner and immigration terminal at Pier 2 was only a few blocks away making for a convenient transfer to trains at the North Street Station for ocean liner travellers. Ships with large numbers of immigrants were served by special immigrant passenger trains of Colonist cars ran directly into the wharf side sheds on Pier 2, co-ordinated by the North Street Station.

== Service ==
The station opened on August 8, 1877 with a special ceremonial train carrying Canadian Prime Minister Alexander Mackenzie, followed by a public opening the next day. The North Street Station was a union station as it served the Intercolonial but also the Windsor and Annapolis Railway (known as the Dominion Atlantic Railway after 1893) and the Halifax and Southwestern Railway after 1901. The station was the first departure point for such famous named trains as the Ocean Limited in 1904, the Maritime Express and the Flying Bluenose. In 1902, the King Edward Hotel, the most modern, and one of the largest, hotels in Halifax was built immediately across Barrington Street to the station's west.

The North Street Station served as the focus for important civic events such as the departure of Halifax's contingent in the North-West Rebellion of 1885 and the departure of Canadian troops for the Boer War in 1898. The entire front of the station was decorated for the return of Boer War troops in 1901. Following the sinking of RMS Titanic in 1912, numerous private cars of the wealthy filled the special spur beside the station as wealthy families arrived in hopes of identifying and claiming bodies of their loved ones and so many reporters congregated that the station installed extra telegraph lines for their use.

However, by 1912, the North Street Station was reaching its limitations. Built for fewer and shorter trains in the era of 50-foot wooden passenger cars, the newer longer trains with 80-foot steel cars exceeded the size of the station's platform. The increased number of trains taxed the station's limited number of platforms. Hemmed in by Barrington Street to the west, and the Navy dockyard to the east, the station had no room to expand. Plans announced in 1912 for a much larger combined passenger station and ocean liner terminal in Halifax’s South End. Construction of the railway cutting to access the new South End site began in 1913.

== World War I ==
Construction of the tracks, piers and terminal grounds in the south end had just begun when World War I erupted in 1914. While track work slowly continued towards the site of the south end terminal, the North Street Station remained the gateway to Halifax and saw the heaviest use in its history. Thousands of troops arrived in the city prior to embarking overseas followed by thousands of family members and wartime workers piling into the busy wartime port through the North Street Station. As the war dragged on, increasing numbers of wounded arrived back in Canada aboard hospital ships, met at Pier 2 by special hospital trains outfitted and organized at the North Street Station.

=== Halifax Explosion ===
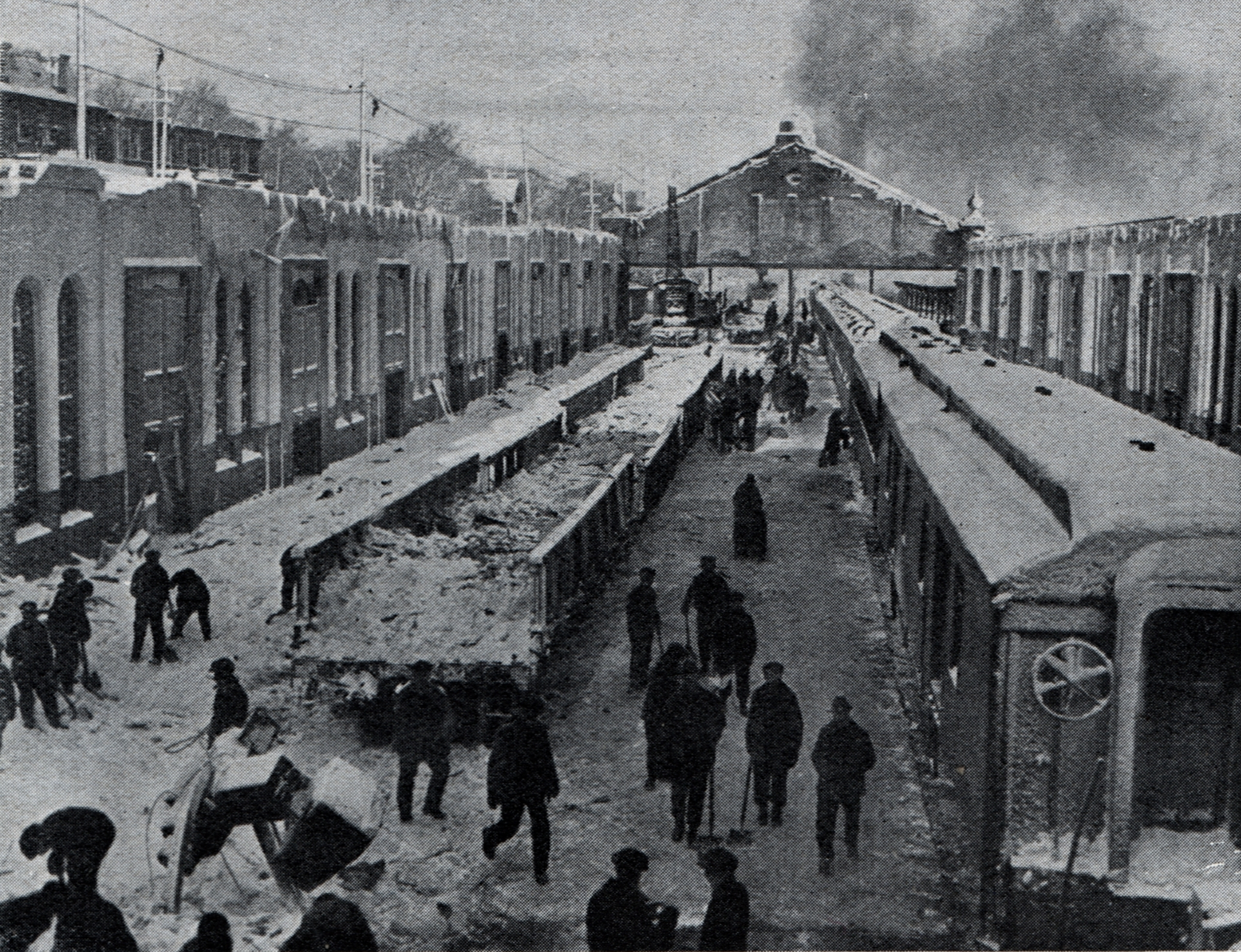
Workers clear debris from the North Street Station's collapsed train shed.

On December 6, 1917, the French ammunition ship SS Mont-Blanc blew up following a collision in Halifax Harbour, a tragedy known as the Halifax Explosion which killed nearly 2000 people. Although numerous accounts of the Halifax Explosion erroneously state that the North Street Station was destroyed, it was only damaged, albeit seriously, and quickly resumed service.

On the morning of the Halifax Explosion, the Ocean Limited had just departed and the local train from Truro had just arrived. The air blast from the explosion collapsed two thirds of the train shed roof. Virtually all the windows in the station were blown away. Doors and walls on the exposed third floor were knocked over and the roof was damaged. In the blizzard that followed the explosion, heating pipes and radiators froze and burst, and portions of the roof collapsed. More significantly, two miles of the approach tracks to the North Street Station were deeply buried in debris and blocked by wrecked railway equipment. This included the destruction on 16% of all the Intercolonial's passenger cars.

A few railway employees were killed at the North Street Station, but most railway deaths occurred in the Richmond yards north of the station, including the entire engine crew of a train that had just left the North Street Station.

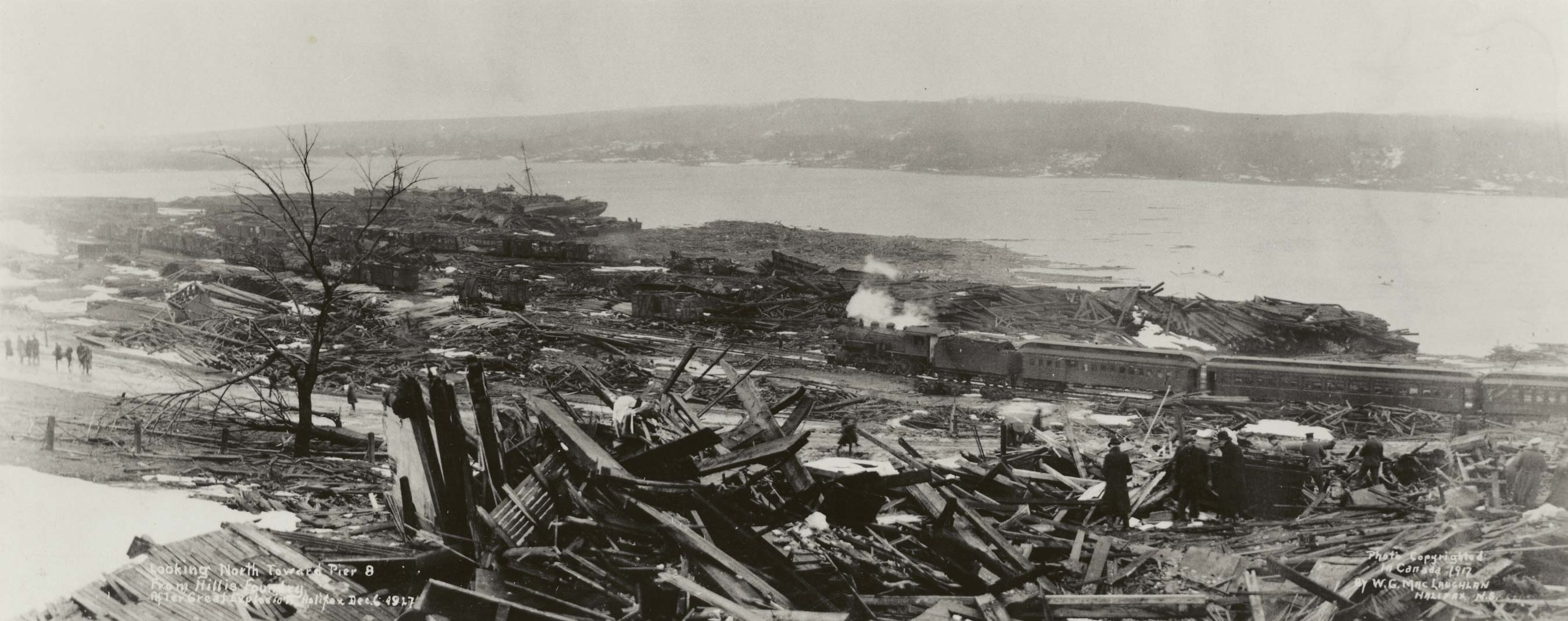
A passenger train departs through devastated Richmond after December 9 when tracks were cleared and service resumed.

Relief and passenger trains were temporarily diverted over the recently laid tracks to the unfinished south end terminal on December 6 and December 7. However railway workers quickly repaired and cleaned up the North Street Station. The remaining train shed roof was hauled down and the platform tracks were cleared on December 8. Windows were boarded up until they could be replaced. Cranes and track crews cleared the wreckage from the track through Richmond allowing the North Street Station to open for a modified passenger schedule on the evening of December 8. The Dominion Atlantic’s Kentville train was the first train to leave from the reopened North Street Station at 6 pm on December 8. Full service resumed from the station on December 9. By January 1918 a new roof had been constructed on the train shed and the express offices had reopened.

== Final year ==
Despite its battered exterior, the North Street Station served for another year of intense passenger traffic as the fighting drew to a close and troops returned home following the Armistice on November 11. However, the heavy wartime traffic highlighted the limited size of the station's terminal tracks, already noted before the war. The Royal Canadian Navy was also eyeing the property in hopes of dockyard expansion. As a result, the South End terminal was brought into permanent operation in 1919. The last regularly scheduled passenger train left the North Street Station on January 4, 1919. Although the North Street station saw a few months of sporadic use for freight, special passenger trains and storage, it was demolished by 1929. Today the site of the station is a parking lot opposite the main gate to HMC Dockyard just north of the Angus L. Macdonald Bridge where it crosses Barrington Street.

== In popular culture ==
The North Street Station provides an important setting in the Canadian novel Barometer Rising by Hugh MacLennan where two major characters are killed in a vivid, although wildly exaggerated depiction of the station's canopy collapse during the Halifax Explosion. The station is also depicted the Canadian Heritage Minute about the heroic telegraph railway dispatcher Vincent Coleman, although Coleman worked at the smaller Richmond station in the nearby railway freight yards.
