= North End, Halifax =

Coordinates: 44°39′47.3″N 63°36′4.6″W

North End
- Subdivision
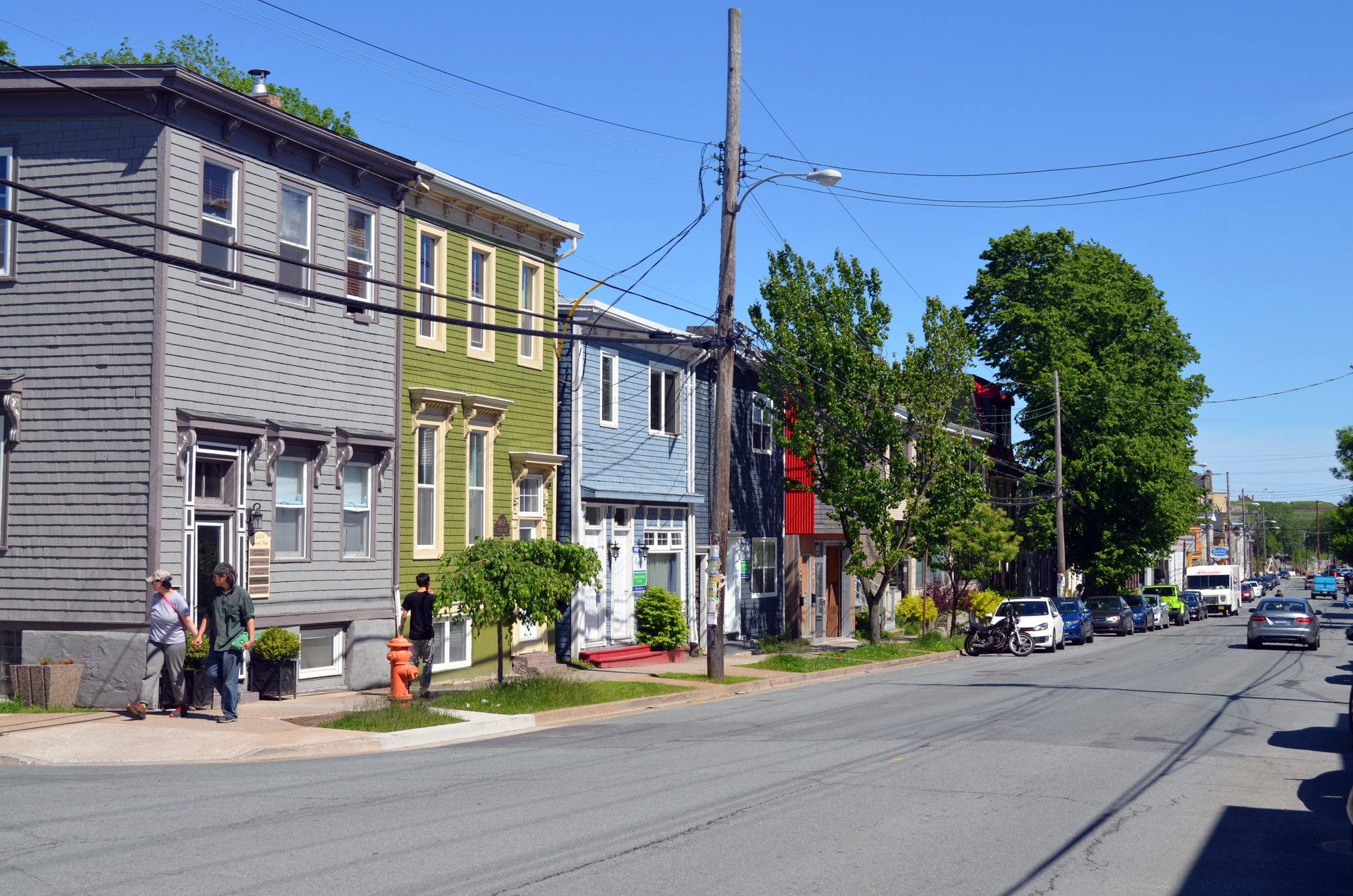
- Agricola Street
- Interactive map of North End
- Country: Canada
- Province: Nova Scotia
- Municipality: Halifax Regional Municipality
- Community council: Halifax and West
- Municipal Districts: Halifax North, Halifax South Downtown
- Area Codes: 782, 902

The North End of Halifax is a neighbourhood of Halifax, Nova Scotia occupying the northern part of Halifax Peninsula immediately north of Downtown Halifax.

== History ==
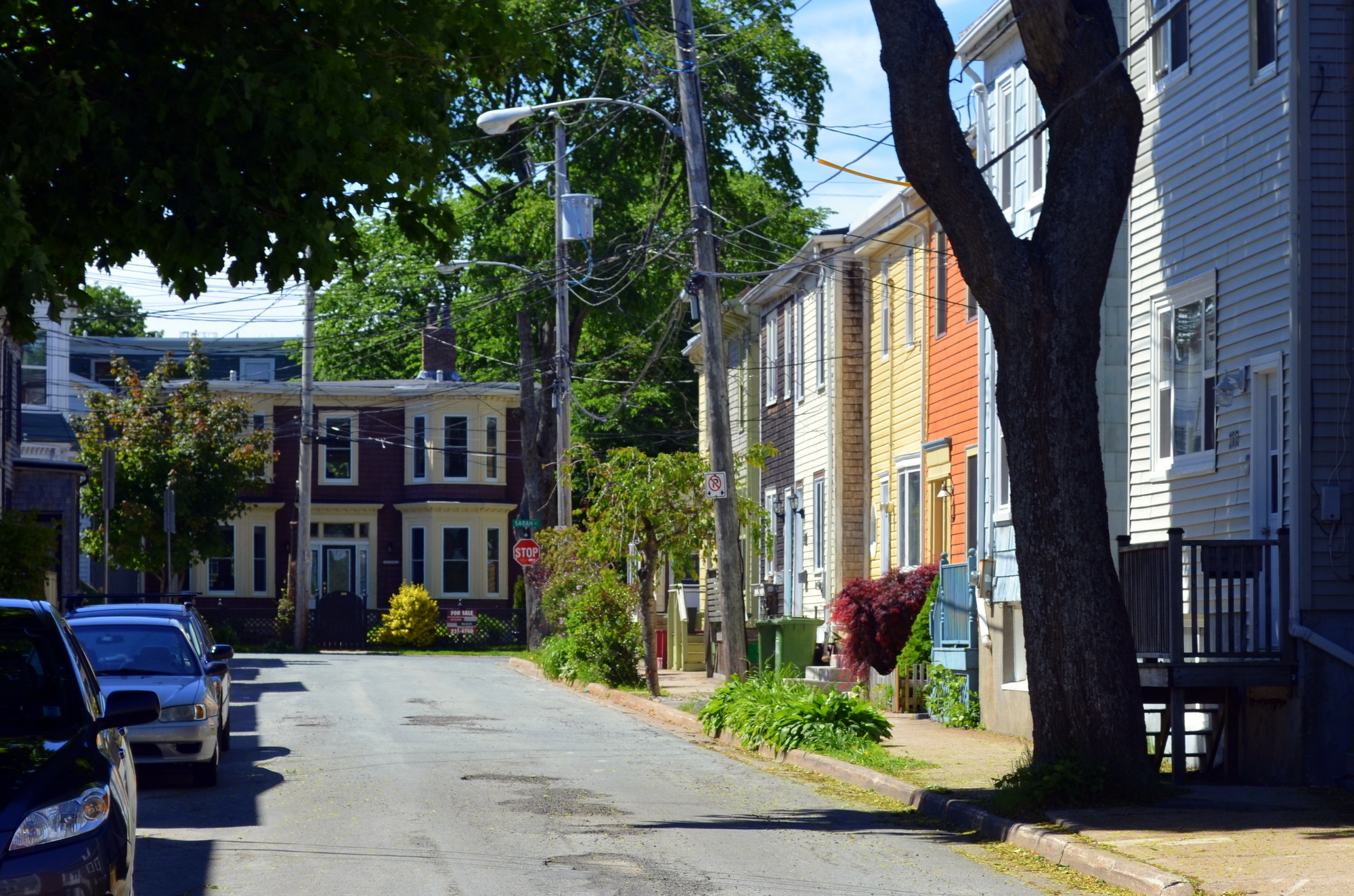
Moran Street, a typical North End residential side street.

Prior to European colonization, the Mi'kmaq inhabited the land throughout Atlantic Canada and Northern Maine.

The North End of Halifax began as an agricultural expansion north from central Halifax as African American and German Foreign Protestant settlers arrived in the province.

It became the focus of industry in Halifax with the construction of the Nova Scotia Railway in the 1850s which located its terminal in the North End. Factories such as the Nova Scotia Cotton Manufacturing Company, Hillis & Sons Foundry, and the Acadia Sugar Refinery, made the North End the focus of manufacturing in Halifax. Railway growth intensified with the extension of railways further into the North End and construction of the North Street Station in 1878, the largest station east of Montreal. Wharves warehouses lined the waterfront, along with the city's prison at Rockhead and major defence installations such as HMC Dockyard and Stadacona (formerly HMCS Stadacona and Wellington Barracks, now part of CFB Halifax).

On 6 December 1917, the Halifax Explosion damaged and destroyed much of the North End. The explosion's aftermath saw the area north of North Street razed, and a new street grid was superimposed over the old street patterns. New residential construction saw the creation of the Hydrostone neighbourhood, built during the relief construction following the disaster. Today the memorial bells at Fort Needham, which were recovered from a church that didn't survive the event, may be heard in the carillon and monument to the disaster. The Memorial was designed by Nova Scotia architect Keith L. Graham. The Halifax Shipyard was built in 1918 beside the Naval Dockyard, further entrenching the industrial character of the North End.

The area once included historic Africville. A former African-Canadian community settled by African slaves coming to Canada, it was located on the shores of the Bedford Basin within the North End. A consequence of the Halifax Explosion, the community was damaged on 6 December 1917. In January 1964, the City Council of Halifax voted to relocate the residents of the community. The municipal government justified the destruction of Africville by citing the poor living conditions of the community, despite having historically refused to extend those services to the community. The community was torn down in the 1960s preceding a proposed urban redevelopment of the region which would see new highways and the construction of the A. Murray MacKay Bridge, although the lands of the community were never used in a proposed port expansion. In the ensuing controversy it was designated as parkland. The Africville expropriation is often characterized as an example of institutional racism in Halifax. Descendants and residents of Africville were dispersed among some of the North End's public housing projects, as well as into other communities throughout the urban area, and beyond. Seaview Park on the Bedford Basin is the site of Africville

The North End has traditionally been home to a number of important African Nova Scotian institutions. Provincial institutions like the African United Baptist Association and the Nova Scotia Association for the Advancement of Colored People were formed in the North End at New Horizons Baptist Church. Throughout the 20th century, Gottingen Street was the epicenter for black business and enterprise in Nova Scotia, including being home to a beauty shop and school owned by Viola Desmond. The North End housed one of the first Afrocentric schools in Canada, St. Patrick's-Alexandra School (closed in 2011). A neighbourhood with strong African Nova Scotian roots, the area has undergone gentrification in recent years. As a result, the proportion of Black residents in the neighbourhood has fallen from 30% in 2006 to 15% in 2016.

In 1966, the Halifax North Memorial Public Library was opened in memory of the victims of the explosion. Located on at 2285 Gottingen Street.

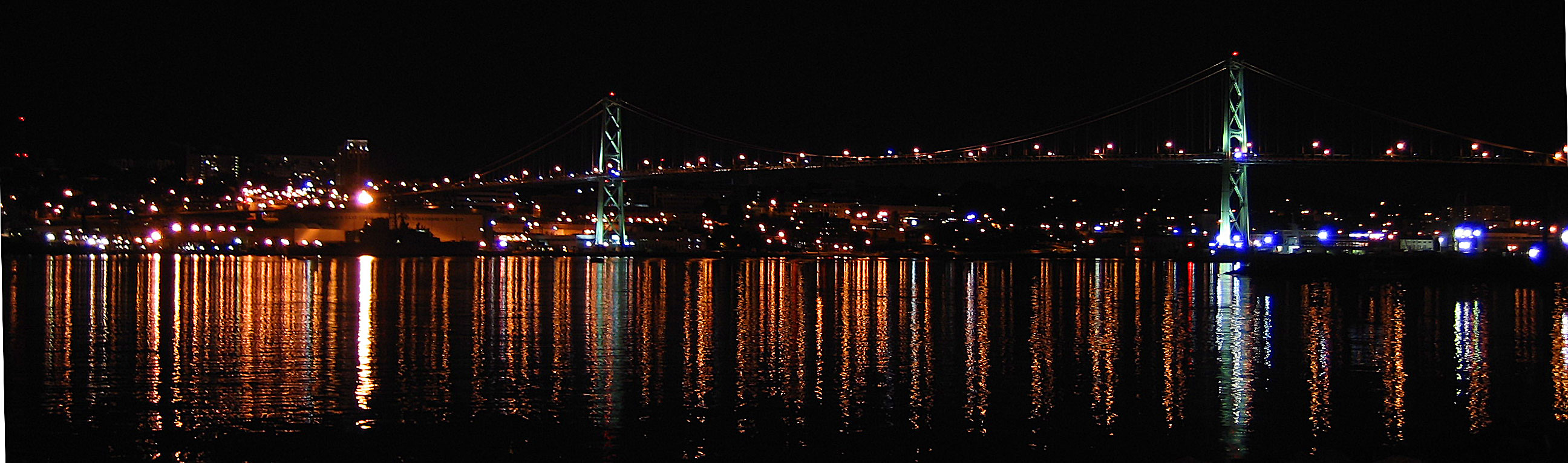
The Angus L. Macdonald Bridge opened in 1955, changing the North End and the Halifax-Dartmouth region forever. Its western abutment is located at the foot of the North End and the bridge connects North Street with Dartmouth.

== Geography ==
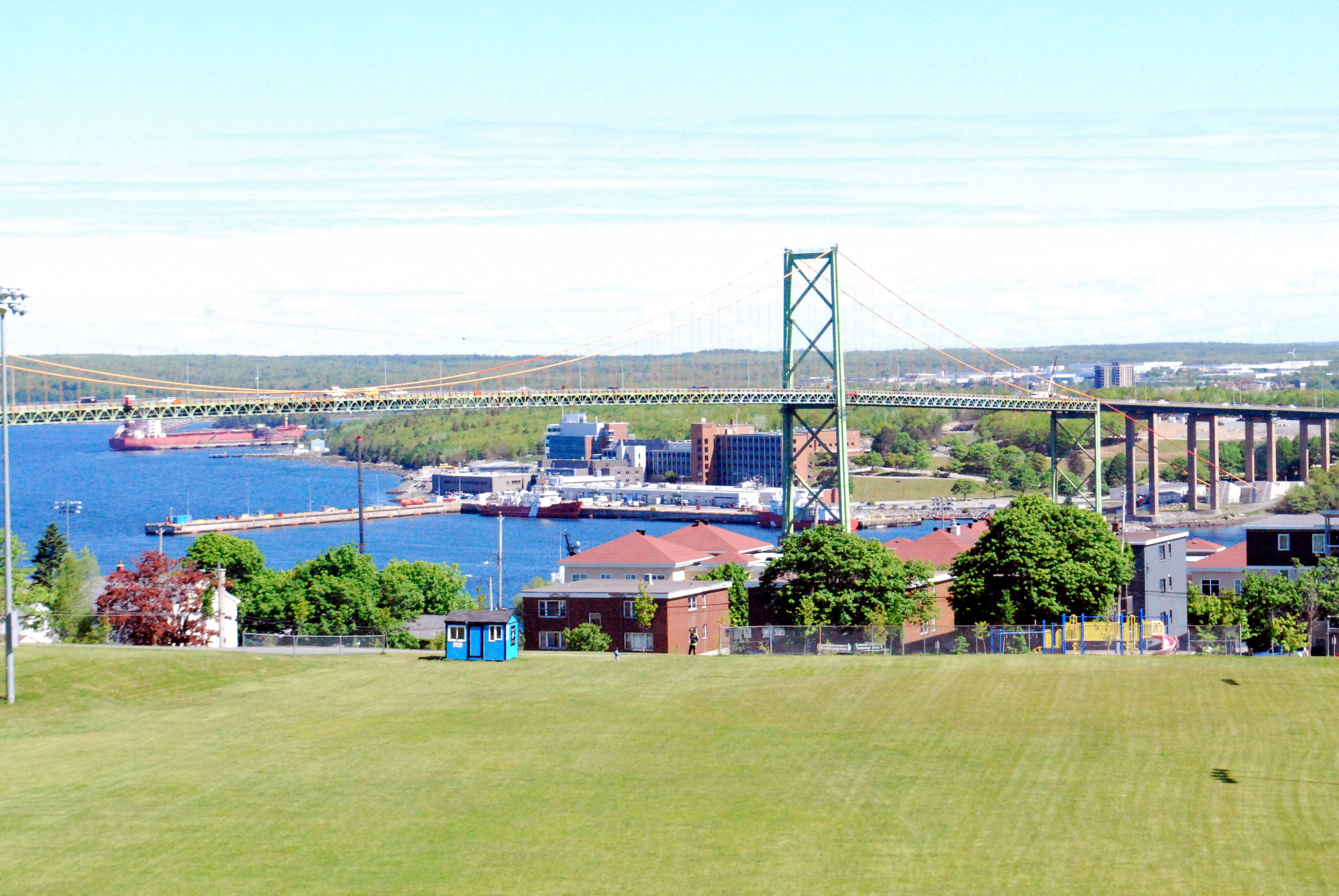
View of BIO & Coast Guard base on the shore of North Dartmouth across the fields in Merv Sullivan park, known locally in the North End as the Pit.

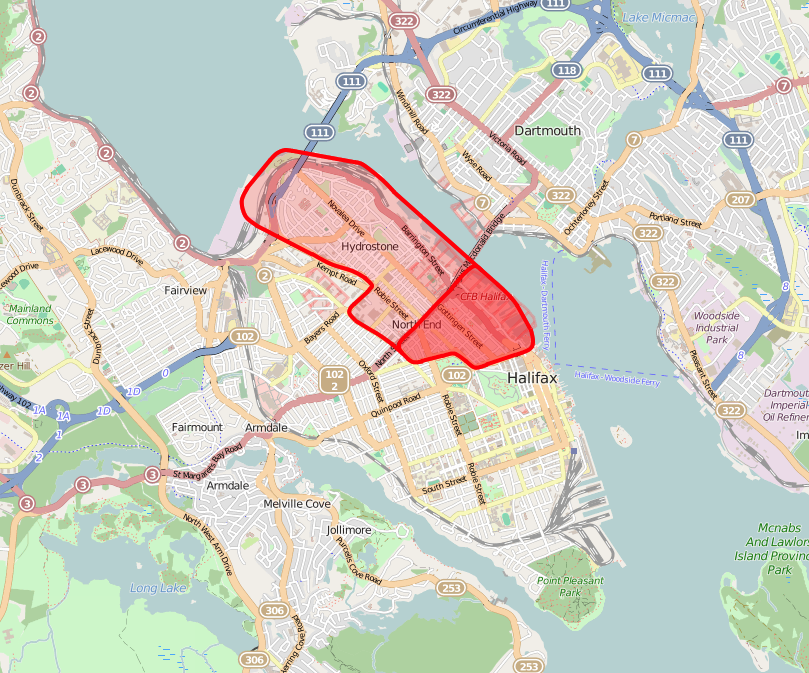
The boundary of the North End is not definite. The darker highlighted area marks the traditional definition of the district, while a modern broad definition includes everything north of the old bridge.

By the end of the 19th century, the perception of the North End had come to generally include Richmond as well. Following its total destruction in the Halifax Explosion, Richmond never again regained its individual identity. The area underwent significant redevelopment during the inter-war period and gradually became an extension of the original North End.

The northern part of the Halifax Peninsula comprises thin soil resulting from glacial deposits, as well as outcroppings of a dark sedimentary shale known as ironstone. The entire peninsula has no significant surface water, unlike the areas northeast and southwest of Halifax Harbour (the Eastern Shore and South Shore respectively).

At 60 m (200 ft) in elevation, Citadel Hill is the highest point on the peninsula and when combined with the expansive undeveloped parkland of the North Common, creates a physical boundary that separates the various neighbourhoods. Fort Needham is another glacial drumlin located in the heart of the North End.

The neighbourhood referred to as the North End by Halifax residents was bounded by the north of the Bedford Basin, and on the east by The Narrows of Halifax Harbour. Its other boundaries as not as sharply defined, but the western limit of the neighbourhood is generally agreed to be Windsor street. The southern boundary was, traditionally, the northern limit of the original settlement of Halifax along the slope of Citadel Hill (now Cogswell Street), and continuing along the northern edge of the North Common to Quinpool Road. The northern boundary has steadily migrated toward the Bedford Basin since Halifax's founding. The boundary originally ended at North Street, just as the South End ended at South Street. A neighbourhood further to the north was Richmond, and was located on the eastern slope of Fort Needham. Further north of Richmond, at the end of the Campbell Road, was the former community of Africville.

== Parks and recreation ==
There are arenas, community-centres, libraries, parks, public pools, and trails within the North End of Halifax.

Arenas

- Devonshire Arena (demolished)

Community centres

- Citadel Community Centre

Community YMCA

- George Dixon Centre
- Needham Centre

Libraries

- Halifax North Memorial Library

Parks

- Cabot Place Park
- Fort Needham Memorial Park
- Hydrostone Park
- Mercel Place Park
- Memorial Park
- Sebastian Place Park
- Merv Sullivan Park
- Stairs Place Park

Public pools

- Centennial Pool
- Needham Pool

Trails

- Africville Trails
- Memorial Drive Trail

== Culture ==
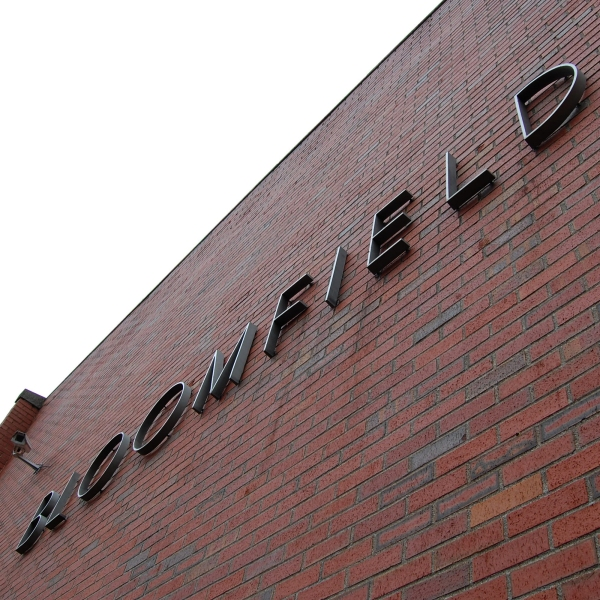
The former Bloomfield School became Bloomfield Centre, a local arts community, before being shuttered.

The areas of Creighton Street, Gottingen Street, and Maynard Street were traditionally home to a large middle-class African Canadian population, while lower-income families lived nearby in Uniacke Square. Many of the black home owners operated businesses, or were working professionals. The North End has long been seen as a center of commerce, education, entertainment, and religion among African Nova Scotians. However, uncontrolled gentrification of the North End has changed the area's demographics considerably.

In recent years, the North End has become a popular destination for Halifax's growing university population. As the prices of apartments closer to Dalhousie University and Saint Mary's University continue to rise, and as the cost of transportation has fallen due to the introduction of the U-pass, students are finding cheaper accommodations in the North End. This has spawned a thriving artistic community, with many musicians, painters, and writers lured to this neighbourhood, at the expense of some long time residents. There is still a Black presence in the community, although it is shrinking and for the most part limited to the confines of the public housing surrounding Uniacke Square. As of 2019, only a handful of homes are still owned by Black families.

The area has become home to organizations such as the Bloomfield Centre, Grainery Food Co-Op, Turnstile Pottery Cooperative, the North End Community Gardening Association, Anchor Archive Zine Library, North By North End, and the Nova Scotia Youth Project. Plans are now under way for the redevelopment of Bloomfield Centre.

=== Historic buildings ===
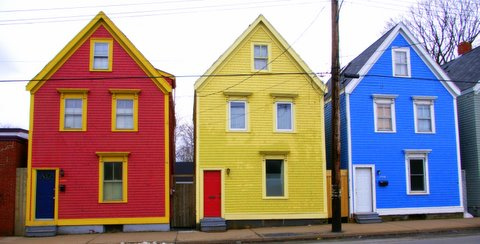
North End houses

The Halifax Armoury, on North Park Street, is a National Historic Site. The massive Romanesque Revival building resembles an old castle, but it boasted numerous technological innovations when it opened in 1899, including the adoption of electricity and the truss structure that permitted a large interior space with no columns or walls. HMCS Stadacona is home to numerous other historic military buildings.

The North End is also home to the Halifax Shipyard, sited just to the north of HMC Dockyard. Founded in 1889, the shipyard has built many vessels for the Royal Canadian Navy and is the largest full-service shipyard on the east coast. In 2011 the shipyard was selected to build the navy's new combat fleet, comprising 21 vessels costing $25 billion over a period of 30 years. Irving Shipbuilding, owner of the shipyard, has undertaken a $300 million upgrade of the facility, boasting that Halifax will have "the most modern shipyard in North America". The shipbuilding contract is expected to employ between 2,000 and 2,500 people at the height of construction in 2021.

The North End is home to several historic churches. The Little Dutch Church, adapted as a church in 1756, is the second-oldest building in the municipality. St. George's Church is a unique round church at the corner of Brunswick and Cornwallis Streets completed in 1801. After St. George's Church was badly burned in an accidental 1994 fire, Prince Charles, who had visited it in 1983 with Princess Diana, was among those who donated toward its reconstruction. The restoration was completed in 2000.

St Patrick's Church, also on Brunswick Street, was founded in 1843 and rebuilt in its present form in 1885.

The Africville Church, established in 1849 and razed under cover of darkness in 1969, was reconstructed in 2011 as part of the Africville Apology.

=== Military installations ===
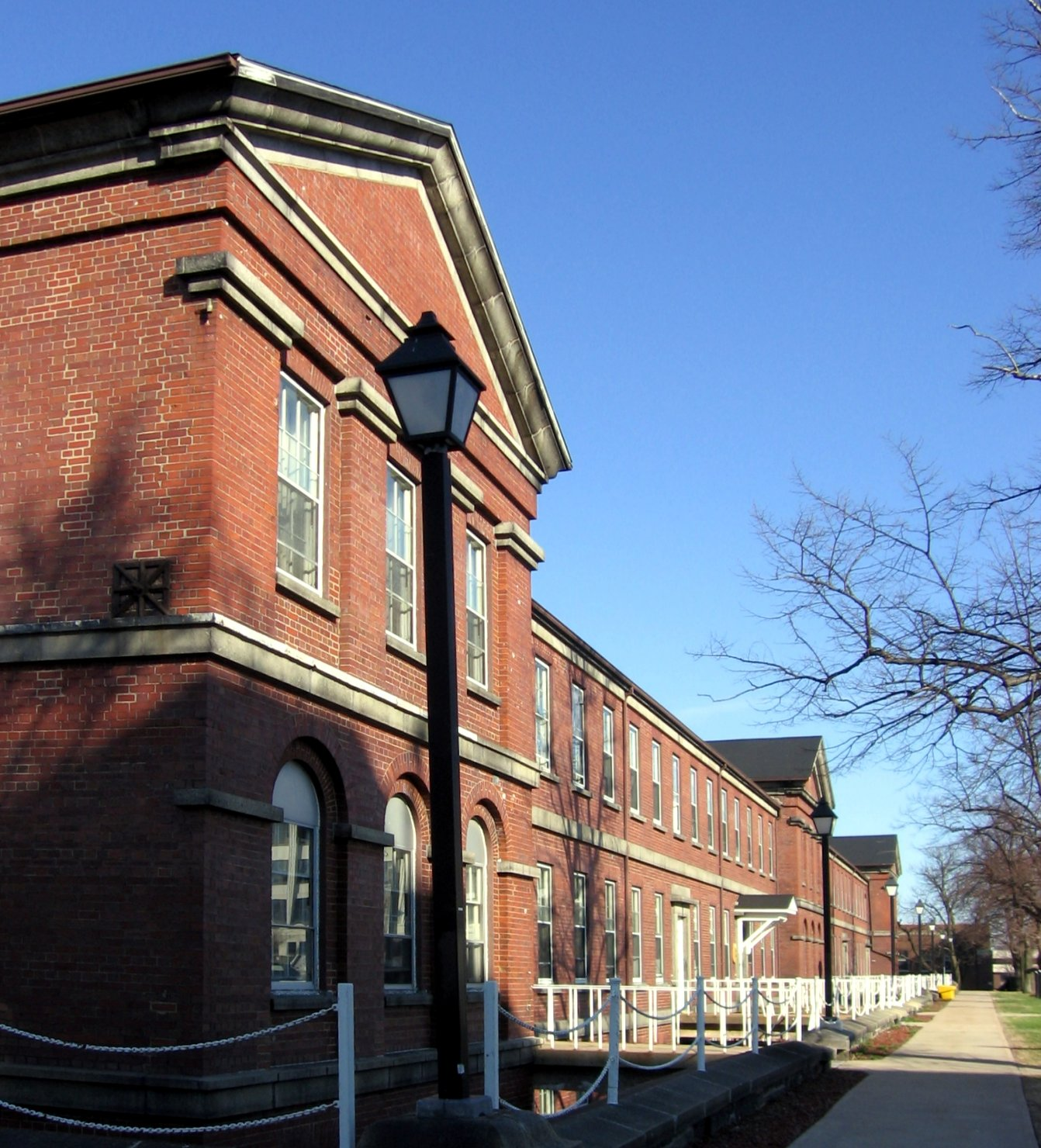
Wellington Barracks, Stadacona

The North End is home to several of military installations within CFB Halifax, the country's largest military base. His Majesty's Canadian Dockyard (HMC Dockyard Halifax) is a sprawling complex that occupies the harbourfront area next to the traditional North End. Stadacona, on the opposite side of Barrington Street, is host to barracks and a host of supporting facilities housed in both historic and modern structures. In the centre of the peninsula, away from the shoreline, Windsor Park and Willow Park are home to base transport and supply, housing, the Canadian Forces Exchange System, the curling club, the Military Police, and the Military Family Resource Centre.

== Demographics ==
The Gottingen Street area population declined from high of 11,939 people in 1951, to a low of 4,494 people in 1996. However, in recent years the trend has reversed as more housing is built in the area and as vacant lots have been developed. The population has risen substantially since the 1996 Census, resulting in an ever-more diverse neighbourhood.

== Economy ==
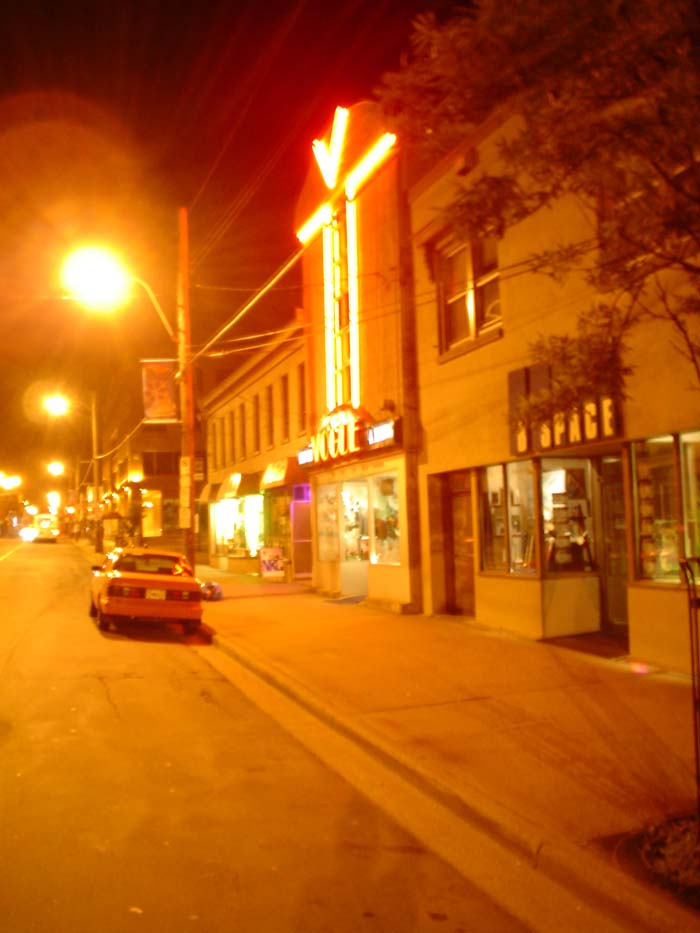
Gottingen Street at night.

Gottingen Street is the commercial and entertainment heart of the North End, and is home to numerous shops, bars, clubs, and performance venues. In 1950, the four blocks of Gottingen closest to downtown were the site of more than 130 enterprises, including two cinemas. The street declined in stature as the peninsula lost population during the latter half of the 20th century, and as a result of car-oriented urban renewal schemes. Many nearby residences were demolished when the northern part of Barrington Street was transformed into a highway to serve the Macdonald Bridge, and when the Cogswell Interchange was built. In 1958, several blocks of houses and apartment buildings were demolished in an attempt to boost patronage on Gottingen by providing additional car parking. Seven new parking lots were built, displacing local residents to other areas, but according to a Dalhousie University study, this had "no positive impact on the vitality of the Gottingen Street commercial district".

Agricola Street, which runs parallel to Gottingen Street, is a commercial district home to many local galleries, restaurants, and shops. It has also benefited from new residential developments that have increased the local population.

Businesses of The Hydrostone serve as the commercial centre of the northern half of the North End.

== Transportation ==
The North End, located on the Peninsula, is served well by public transportation.

Halifax Transit routes

- Route 7A (Peninsula)
- Route 7B (Peninsula)
- Route 29 (Barrington)
- Route 93 (Bedford Highway)

== Education ==
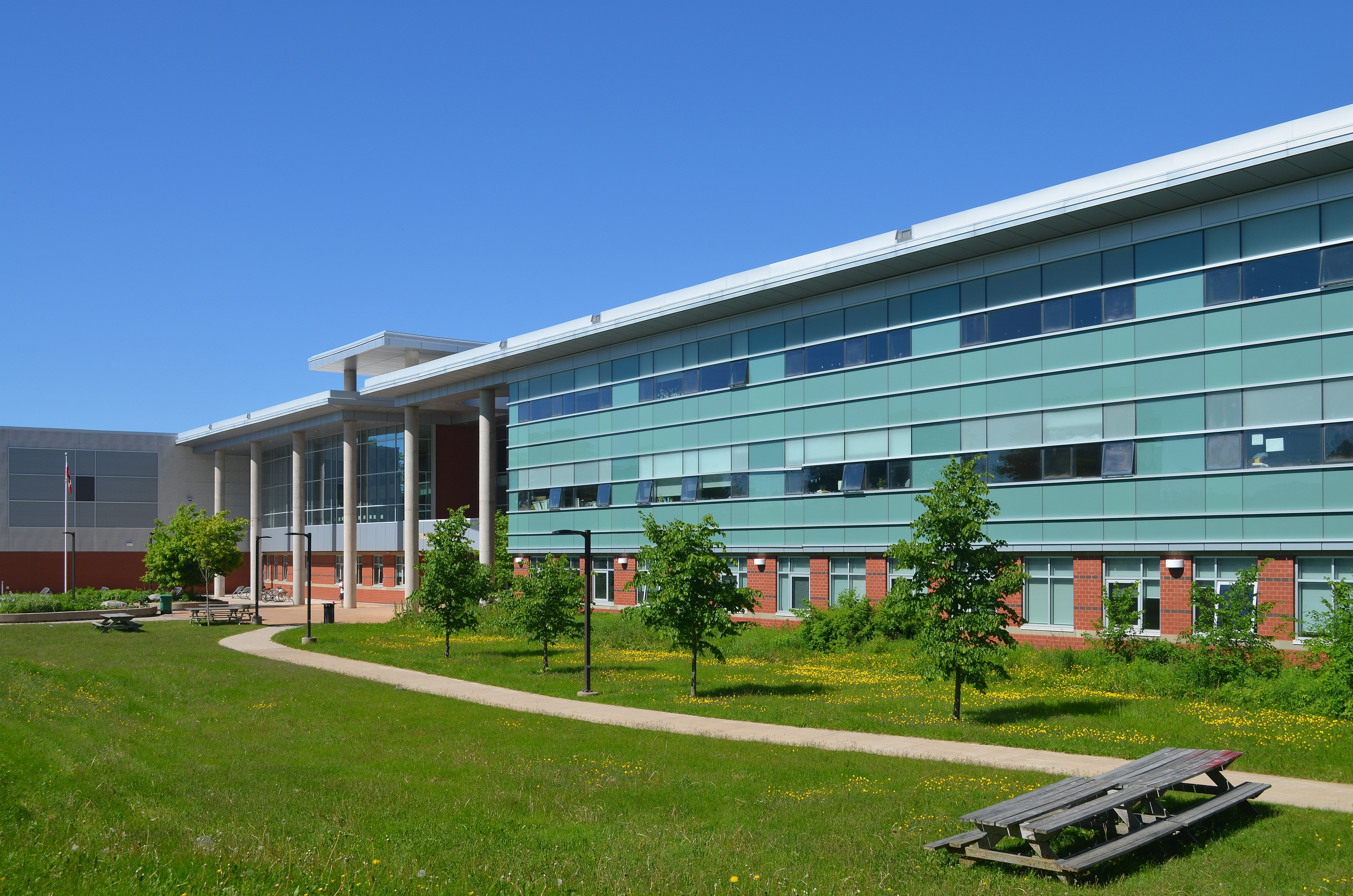
Citadel High School

There is a private school, public schools, as well as a post-secondary educational facility within the North End.

Post-secondary education

- Nova Scotia Community College (Institute of Technology Campus)

Private school

- Shambhala School

Public schools

- Citadel High School
- Ecole Oxford School
- Highland Park Junior High
- Joseph Howe Elementary School
- St. Joseph's-Alexander McKay Elementary School
- St. Stephen's Elementary School
