= Nova Scotia Cotton Manufacturing Company =

Cotton mill in Halifax explosion

Coordinates: 44°39′28.2″N 63°36′02.4″W

The Nova Scotia Cotton Manufacturing Company was a cotton mill located in Halifax, Nova Scotia which was founded in 1882 and destroyed with great loss of life by the Halifax Explosion in 1917.

The company was formed as part of an effort to industrialize the Maritime provinces of Canada and switch from merchant shipping to manufacturing under Canada's National Policy. Typical of the regional enthusiasm for industry in the 1880s, the company was quickly capitalized by 32 local investors within two weeks, drawn from a who's who of Halifax manufacturers, merchants and business leaders including railway engineer Sandford Fleming. Carefully studying other cotton mills, the company built a state-of-the-art mill on Robie Street in North End, Halifax, bringing in textile workers from Lancashire, England. Halifax City Council paid for water mains and subsidized the construction of a five-mile railway spurline from the Intercolonial Railway's yards on the waterfront. The "cotton factory spur", as it came to be known, created Halifax's first industrial park along Robie Street, attracting other factories such as the Silliker Car Works, the Henderson & Potts Paint factory and later the railway shops of the Canadian Government Railways.

The mill began production in 1883. It produced plain cotton with a workforce of 600, half of them women including a dozen girls under 16. By the end of the 1880s, it was the second largest employer in Halifax, after the Acadia Sugar Refinery, and the seventh largest producer of cotton in Canada. The company paid small dividends in the first few years but soon feel into debt and had to cut production, dropping to 317 workers by 1891. The mill found it difficult to compete with much larger textile mills in Montreal and Toronto and provided historians with a classic example of the difficulty of Maritime firms to compete with larger Canadian competitors. It was purchased in January 1891 by the Dominion Cotton Mills Company of Montreal, the first purchase in a string of acquisitions by the Montreal firm which became Dominion Textile.

The mill was destroyed on December 6, 1917 by an accidental explosion of a munitions ship in Halifax Harbour known as the Halifax Explosion. Although almost a mile from the explosion and out-of-sight of the harbour, the mill was devastated by the explosion. The shock wave caused a partial collapse of the concrete floors of the building and started a fire which consumed the building and killed many of the workers.

After the explosion, Dominion Textile shifted production to other mills. The walls and first floor of the mill remained and were roofed over to store supplies for the city's reconstruction. The Halifax lumber and building supply firm Piercey's opened in the former factory in the 1920s and continued to operate from the building until Rona built a new store on the adjacent lot on Almon Street about 2014. The building was demolished in 2016 and is now a vacant lot.
