= Bedford Magazine explosion =

1945 incident in Nova Scotia, Canada

Coordinates: 44°42′19.1″N 63°37′19.89″W

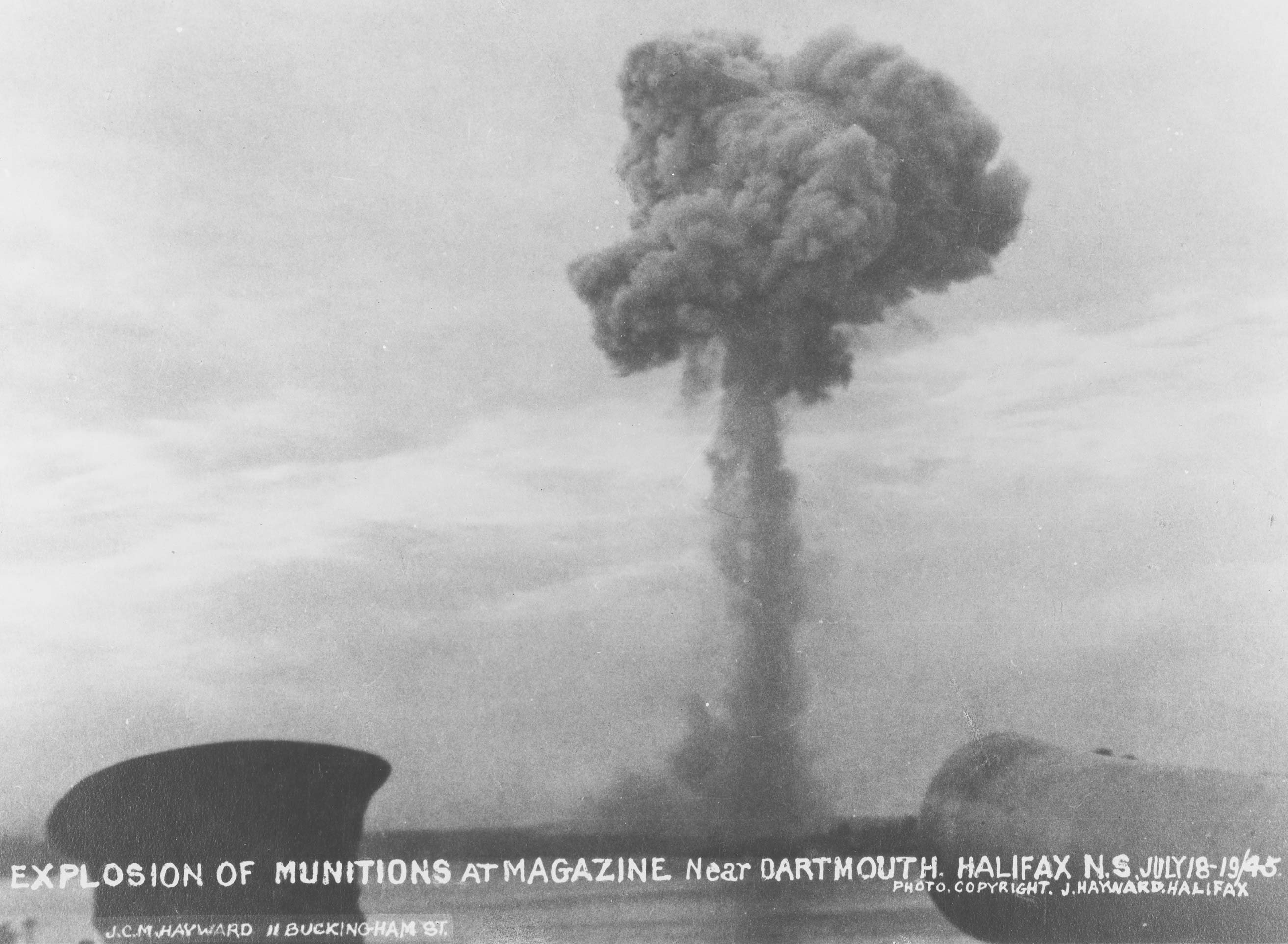
Blast cloud from Bedford Magazine Explosion

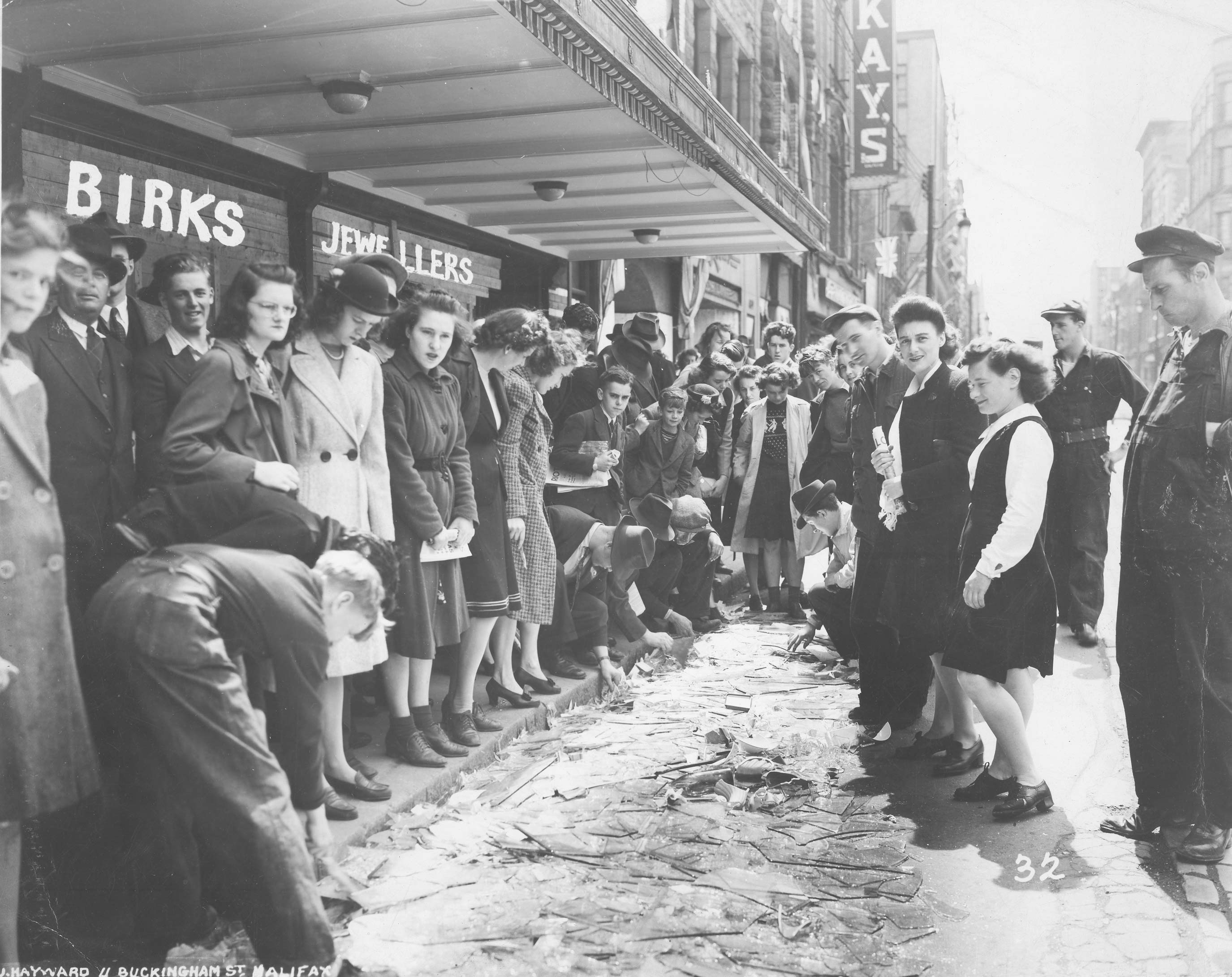
A crowd of people viewing broken glass outside Henry Birks & Sons Limited, Barrington St., Halifax

The Bedford Magazine explosion was a conflagration resulting in a series of explosions from July 18 to 19, 1945, in Bedford, Nova Scotia, Canada. During World War II, the adjacent cities of Halifax and Dartmouth provided heavy support for Canada's war effort in Europe.

Not long after VE-Day, on the evening of Wednesday, July 18, a fire broke out on the jetty of the Bedford Magazine, now CFAD Bedford (Magazine Hill) on the Bedford Basin, north of Dartmouth. The magazine fire began when a barge exploded that evening at 6:30 PM, quickly spreading fire to the dock where ammunition had been temporarily stored outside due to overcrowding in the main compound. A chain reaction of fires, explosions, and concussions ensued, continuing for more than 24 hours.

Halifax, having been previously devastated by the Halifax Explosion, had emergency plans in place for such an incident, leading to an orderly and widespread evacuation of Halifax's northern half. The damage resulting from this incident was far less than that of the Halifax Explosion; however, the blasts shattered windows, crumpled roofs, and cracked structures. Very few injuries were reported, with none severe. Patrolman Henry Raymond Craig, a naval seaman on watch that night, was the lone fatality, having rushed to the pier upon noticing a fire, just before the initial barge explosion.

The community was still resentful of the navy for the VE-Day Riots, but the efforts of voluntary firefighting by naval personnel at the ammunition depot helped to alleviate these lingering feelings.

The barge responsible for starting the explosion presently lies on the seabed near the eastern shoreline adjacent to the CFAD Bedford magazine dock.
