= A Romance of the Halifax Disaster =

1918 rare novella by Frank McKelvey Bell

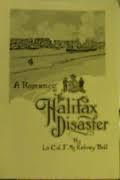
- Title page for A Romance of the Halifax Disaster (1918)
- Author: Frank McKelvey Bell
- Language: English
- Genre: Romance
- Publisher: Royal Print & Litho
- Publication date: 1918
- Publication place: Canada
- Media type: Print (hardcover)
- Pages: 82
- OCLC: 41760407

A Romance of the Halifax Disaster (1918) is a rare novella by Canadian Lieutenant-Colonel Frank McKelvey Bell based on the Halifax Explosion of 1917. Bell, after the explosion, had assisted in the medical rescue. His experiences during this time allowed him to write about the physical trauma suffered by Haligonians. Rather than focusing on medical professionals, though, Bell positions his narrative as a romance between a young volunteer and an injured soldier. In the disaster's aftermath, Bell was the chair of the medical relief committee.

== Background ==
Haligonian publisher Gerald Weir released the small novella which is today relegated to rare book collections and archival holdings; original copies are worth several hundred dollars apiece. Much of the interest surrounding this book likely arises from the rare photographs which appear on every other page, as well as a detailed list of the dead and a fold out map which are included at the end of the novella.

== Plot summary ==
Vera Warrington and Tom Welsford enter the narrative while floating and flirting on the Saint Lawrence River. Years later, Vera is engaged to the wealthy William Lawson and has not heard from Tom. Shortly before the explosion, Tom returns to Halifax, Nova Scotia, for orthopaedic surgery for a war wound. Tom is still in hospital when the disaster occurs. As a volunteer with the Voluntary Aid Division, Vera darts to the hospital only in time to witness Will's death and her liberation from the marriage which was to occur later that day. Now free, Vera finds Tom in a hospital bed and accepts his proposal: the last line of the book belongs to Vera, agreeing to marriage.

== See also ==
- Barometer Rising
- Literature of Nova Scotia
