= Halifax Explosion =

1917 maritime disaster in Halifax, Nova Scotia, Canada

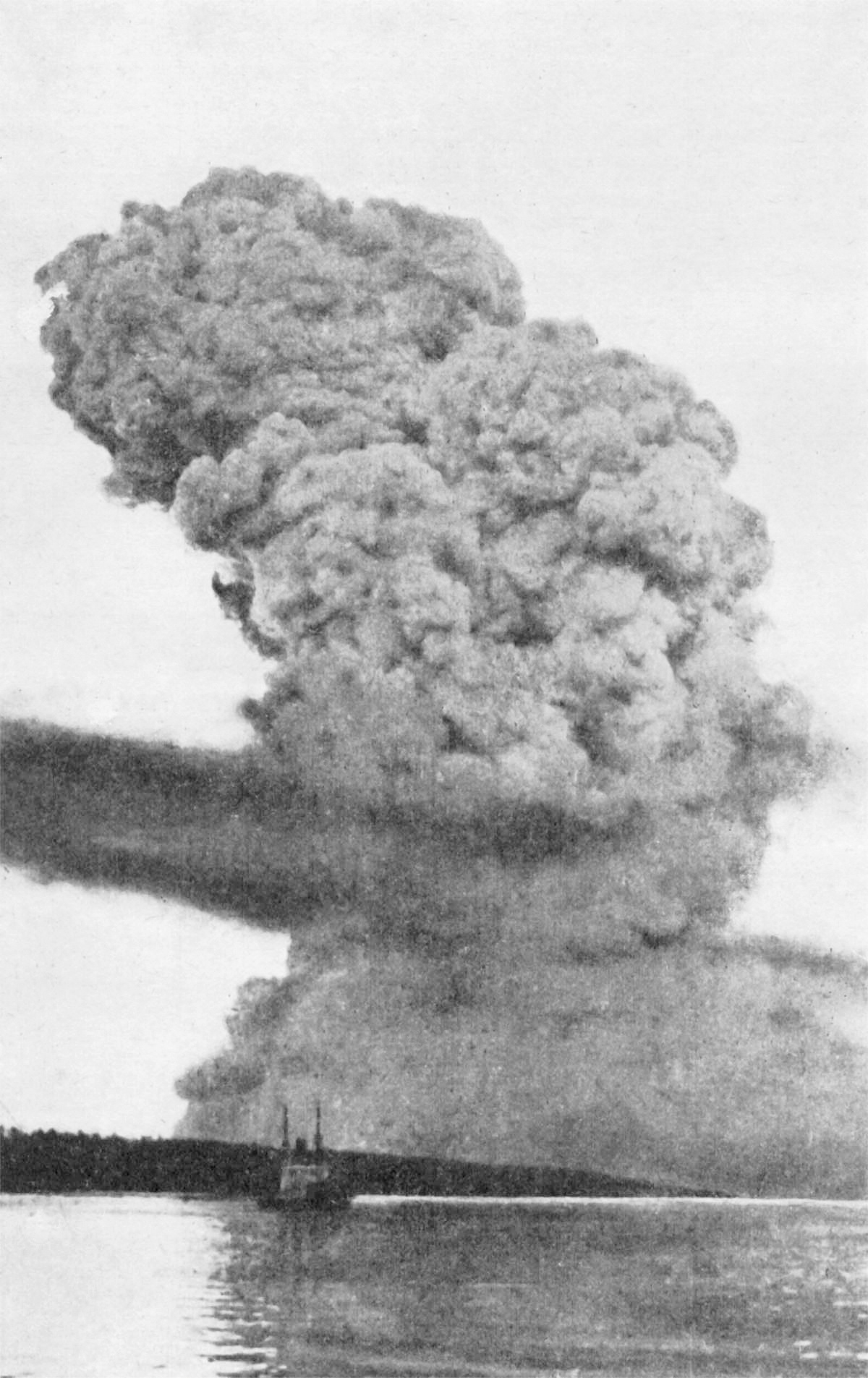
- The pyrocumulus cloud produced by the explosion
- Date: 6 December 1917; 108 years ago
- Time: 9:04:35 am (AST)
- Location: Halifax, Nova Scotia, Canada
- Deaths: 1,782 (confirmed)
- Injuries: 9,000 (approximate)

On the morning of 6 December 1917, the French cargo ship SS Mont-Blanc and the Norwegian vessel SS Imo collided in the harbour of Halifax, Nova Scotia, Canada. Laden with high explosives, Mont-Blanc caught fire and detonated, devastating the Richmond district of Halifax. At least 1,782 people, largely in Halifax and Dartmouth, were killed by the blast, debris, fires, or collapsed buildings, and an estimated 9,000 others were injured. The blast was the largest human-made explosion at the time. It released the equivalent energy of roughly 2.9 kilotons of TNT (12 TJ).

Mont-Blanc was under orders from the French government to carry her cargo from New York City via Halifax to Bordeaux, France. At roughly 8:45 am, she collided at low speed, about one knot (1.2 mph; 1.9 km/h), with the unladen Imo, chartered by the Commission for Relief in Belgium to pick up a cargo of relief supplies in New York. On Mont-Blanc, the impact damaged benzol barrels stored on deck, causing them to leak vapours, which were ignited by sparks from the collision, setting off a fire on board that quickly grew out of control. Around 20 minutes later at 9:04:35 am, Mont-Blanc exploded.

Nearly all structures within an 800-metre (2,600 ft) or half-mile radius, including the community of Richmond, were obliterated. A pressure wave snapped trees, bent iron rails, demolished buildings, grounded vessels (including Imo, which was washed ashore by the ensuing tsunami), and scattered fragments of Mont-Blanc for kilometres. Across the harbour, Dartmouth also sustained widespread damage. A tsunami created by the blast wiped out a community of Mi'kmaq, who had lived in the Tufts Cove area for generations.

Relief efforts began almost immediately, and hospitals quickly became full. Rescue trains began arriving the day of the explosion from across Nova Scotia and New Brunswick, while other trains from central Canada and the Northeastern United States were impeded by blizzards. Construction of temporary shelters to house the many people left homeless began soon after the disaster. The initial judicial inquiry found Mont-Blanc to have been responsible for the disaster, but a later appeal determined that both vessels were to blame. The North End of Halifax has several memorials to the victims of the explosion.

== Background ==
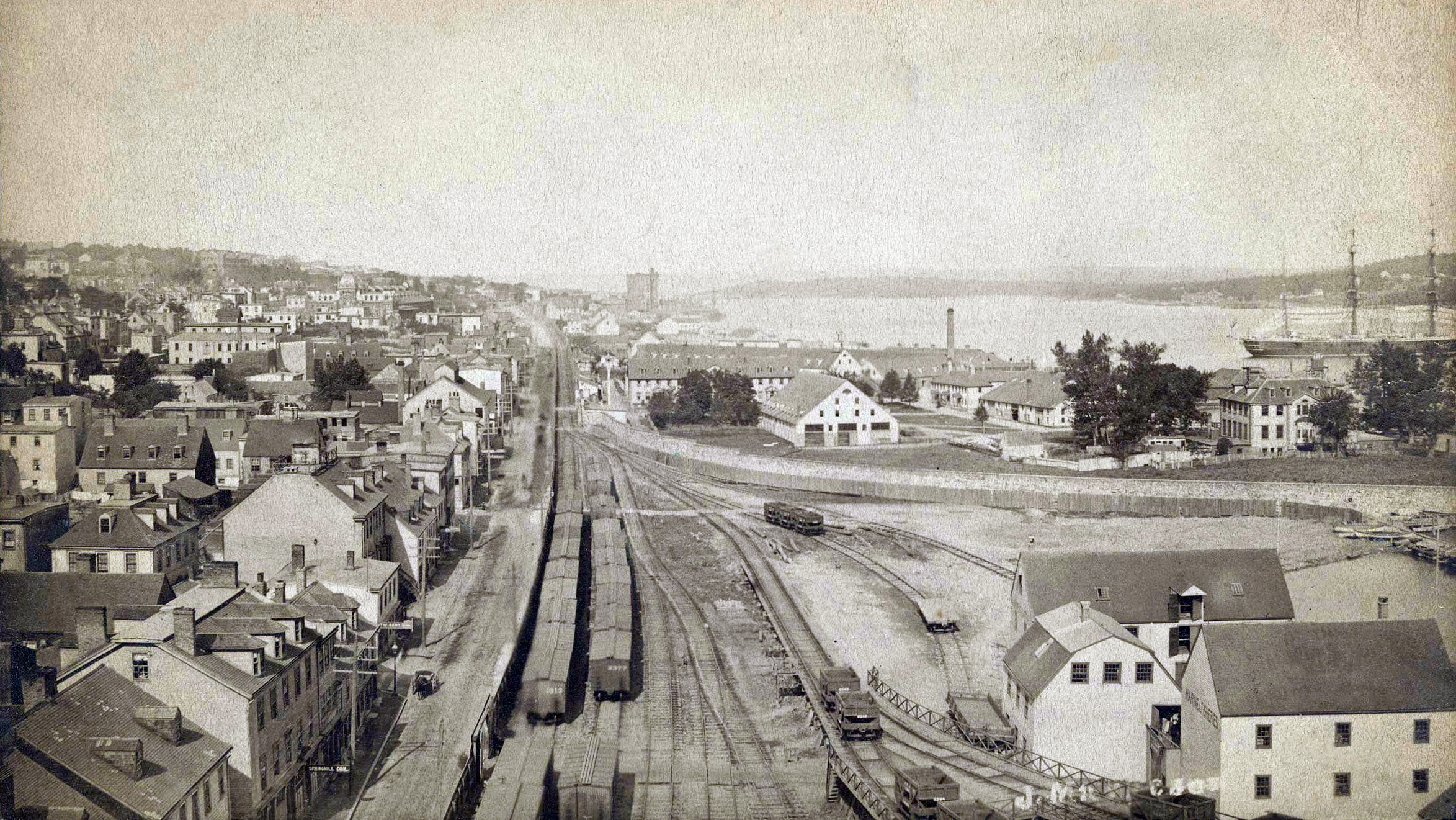
Looking north from a grain elevator towards Acadia Sugar Refinery, c. 1900, showing the area later devastated by the 1917 explosion

Dartmouth lies on the east shore of Halifax Harbour, and Halifax is on the west shore. By 1917, "Halifax's inner harbour had become a principal assembly point for merchant convoys leaving for Britain and France." Halifax and Dartmouth had thrived during times of war; the harbour was one of the British Royal Navy's most important bases in North America, a centre for wartime trade, and a home to privateers who harried the British Empire's enemies during the American Revolution, the Napoleonic Wars, and the War of 1812.

The completion of the Intercolonial Railway and its Deep Water Terminal in 1880 allowed for increased steamship trade and led to accelerated development of the port area, The British garrison left the city in late 1905 and early 1906, and the Canadian government took over the Halifax Dockyard (now CFB Halifax). This dockyard later became the command centre of the Royal Canadian Navy (RCN) on its founding in 1910.

Just before the First World War, the Canadian government began a determined, costly effort to develop the harbour and waterfront facilities. The outbreak of the war brought Halifax back to prominence. As the RCN had virtually no seaworthy ships of its own, the Royal Navy assumed responsibility for maintaining Atlantic trade routes by readopting Halifax as its North American base of operations. In 1915, management of the harbour fell under the control of the RCN; by 1917, the naval fleet in Halifax was growing, including patrol ships, tugboats, and minesweepers.

The population of Halifax/Dartmouth had increased to between 60,000 and 65,000 people by 1917. Convoys carried men, animals, and supplies to the European theatre of war. The two main points of departure were in Nova Scotia at Sydney on Cape Breton Island and Halifax. Hospital ships brought the wounded to the city, so a new military hospital was constructed.

The success of German Untersee-boat attacks on ships crossing the Atlantic Ocean led the Allies to institute a convoy system to reduce losses while transporting goods and soldiers to Europe. Merchant ships gathered at Bedford Basin on the northwestern end of the harbour, which was protected by two sets of anti-submarine nets and guarded by patrol ships of the RCN.

The convoys departed under the protection of British cruisers and destroyers. A large army garrison protected the city with forts, gun batteries, and anti-submarine nets. These factors drove a major military, industrial, and residential expansion of the city, and the weight of goods passing through the harbour increased nearly ninefold. All neutral ships bound for ports in North America were required to report to Halifax for inspection.

== Disaster ==
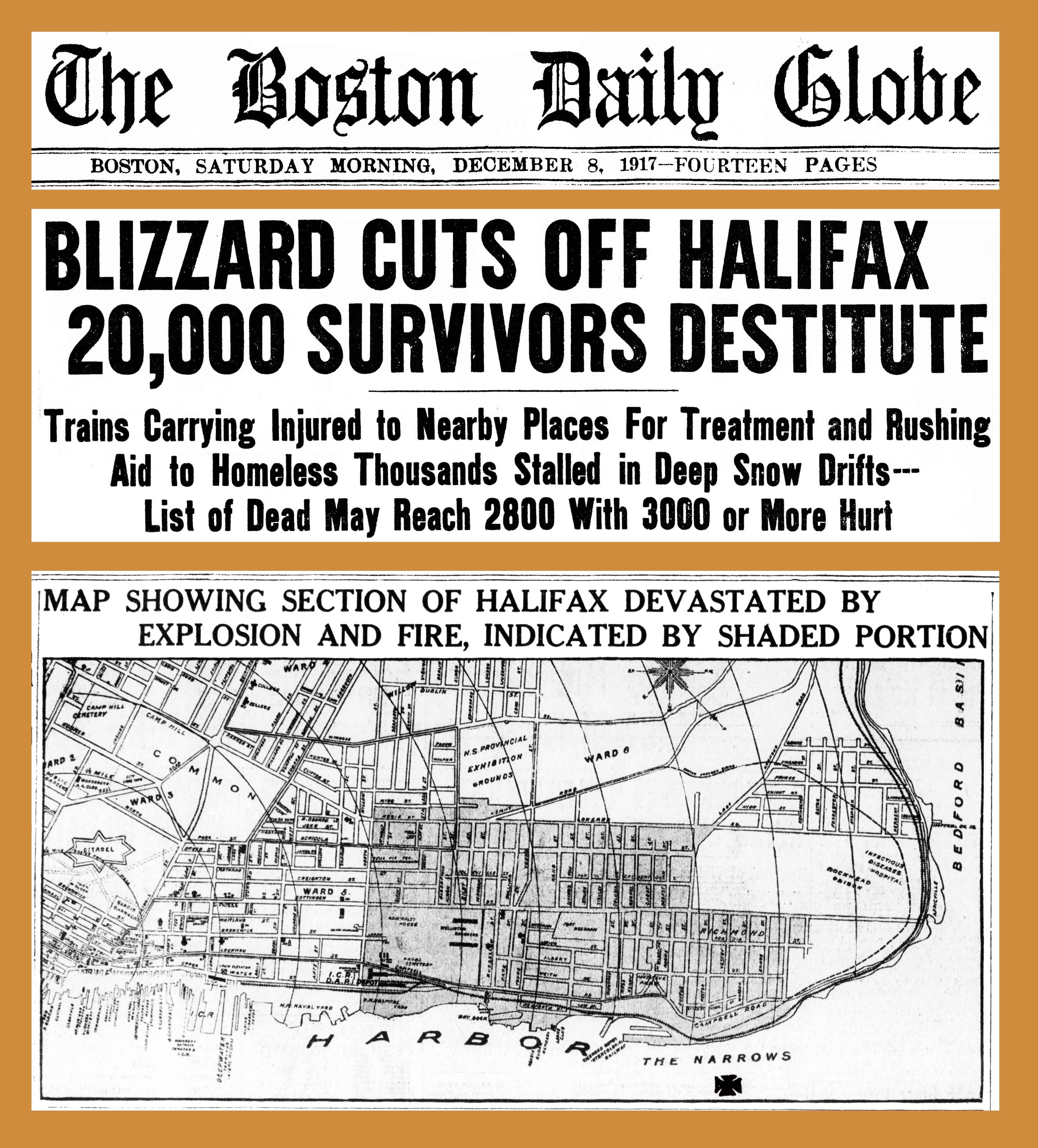
The explosion devastated a large portion of Halifax (shown) and part of Dartmouth (off bottom of map).

The Norwegian ship SS Imo had sailed from the Netherlands en route to New York City to take on relief supplies for Belgium, under the command of Haakon From. The ship arrived in Halifax on 3 December for neutral inspection and spent two days in Bedford Basin awaiting refuelling and supplies. Though she had been given clearance to leave the port on 5 December, Imo's departure was delayed because her coal load did not arrive until late that afternoon. The loading of fuel was not completed until after the anti-submarine nets had been raised for the night. Therefore, the vessel could not depart until the next morning.

The French cargo ship SS Mont-Blanc arrived from New York late on 5 December, under the command of Aimé Le Medec. The vessel was fully loaded with the explosives trinitrotoluene (TNT) and picric acid, the highly flammable fuel benzol, and guncotton. She intended to join a slow convoy gathering in Bedford Basin readying to depart for Europe but was too late to enter the harbour before the nets were raised. Ships carrying dangerous cargo were not allowed into the harbour before the war, but the risks posed by German submarines had resulted in a relaxation of regulations.

Navigating into or out of Bedford Basin required passage through a strait called the Narrows. Ships were expected to keep close to the side of the channel situated on their starboard ("right"), and pass oncoming vessels "port to port", that is to keep them on their "left" side. Ships were restricted to a speed of 5 knots (9.3 km/h; 5.8 mph) within the harbour.

=== Collision and fire ===
External audio
- Mont-Blanc pilot Francis Mackey recalls Halifax 1917 explosion, 6:38, CBC Archives

Imo was granted clearance to leave Bedford Basin by signals from the guard ship HMCS Acadia around 7:30 on the morning of 6 December, with Pilot William Hayes on board. The ship entered the Narrows well above the harbour's speed limit in an attempt to make up for the delay experienced in loading her coal. Imo met American tramp steamer SS Clara being piloted up the wrong (western) side of the harbour. The pilots agreed to pass starboard-to-starboard. Soon afterwards, Imo was forced to head even further towards the Dartmouth shore after passing the tugboat Stella Maris, which was travelling up the harbour to Bedford Basin near mid-channel. Horatio Brannen, the captain of Stella Maris, saw Imo approaching at excessive speed and ordered his ship closer to the western shore to avoid an accident.

Francis Mackey, an experienced harbour pilot, had boarded Mont-Blanc on the evening of 5 December 1917; he had asked about "special protections" such as a guard ship, given Mont-Blanc's cargo, but no protections were put in place. Mont-Blanc started moving at 7:30 am on 6 December and was the second ship to enter the harbour as the anti-submarine net between Georges Island and Pier 21 opened for the morning. Mont-Blanc headed towards Bedford Basin on the Dartmouth side of the harbour. Mackey kept his eye on the ferry traffic between Halifax and Dartmouth and other small boats in the area. He first spotted Imo when she was about 4,000 feet (1.2 km; 0.76 mi) away and became concerned, as her path appeared to be heading towards his ship's starboard side, as if to cut him off. Mackey gave a short blast of his ship's signal whistle to indicate that he had the right of way, but was met with two short blasts from Imo, indicating that the approaching vessel would not yield its position. The captain ordered Mont-Blanc to halt her engines and angle slightly to starboard, closer to the Dartmouth side of the Narrows. He let out another single blast of his whistle, hoping the other vessel would likewise move to starboard, but was again met with a double blast.

Sailors on nearby ships heard the series of signals and, realizing that a collision was imminent, gathered to watch as Imo bore down on Mont-Blanc. Both ships had cut their engines by this point, but their momentum carried them towards each other at slow speed. Unable to ground his ship for fear of a shock that would set off his explosive cargo, Mackey ordered Mont-Blanc to steer hard to port (starboard helm) and crossed the bow of Imo in a last-second bid to avoid a collision. The two ships were almost parallel to each other, when Imo suddenly sent out three signal blasts, indicating the ship was reversing its engines. The combination of the cargoless ship's height in the water and the transverse thrust of her right-hand propeller caused the ship's head to swing into Mont-Blanc. Imo's prow pushed into the No. 1 hold of Mont Blanc, on her starboard side.

The collision occurred at 8:45 am. The damage to Mont Blanc was not severe, but barrels of deck cargo toppled and broke open. This flooded the deck with benzol that quickly flowed into the hold. As Imo's engines kicked in, she disengaged, which created sparks inside Mont-Blanc's hull. These ignited the vapours from the benzol. A fire started at the water line and travelled quickly up the side of the ship. Surrounded by thick black smoke, and fearing she would explode almost immediately, the captain ordered the crew to abandon ship. A growing number of Halifax citizens gathered on the street or stood at the windows of their homes or businesses to watch the spectacular fire. The frantic crew of Mont-Blanc shouted from their two lifeboats to some of the other vessels that their ship was about to explode, but they could not be heard above the noise and confusion. As the lifeboats made their way across the harbour to the Dartmouth shore, the abandoned ship continued to drift and beached herself at Pier 6 near the foot of Richmond street.

Towing two scows at the time of the collision, Stella Maris responded immediately to the fire, anchoring the barges and steaming back towards Pier 6 to spray the burning ship with its fire hose. The tug's captain, Horatio H. Brannen, and his crew realized that the fire was too intense for their single hose and backed off from the burning Mont Blanc. They were approached by a whaler from HMS Highflyer and later a steam pinnace belonging to HMCS Niobe. Captain Brannen and Albert Mattison of Niobe agreed to secure a line to the French ship's stern so as to pull it away from the pier. The five-inch (125 mm) hawser initially produced was deemed too small and orders for a ten-inch (250 mm) hawser came down. At this point, the blast occurred.

=== Explosion ===
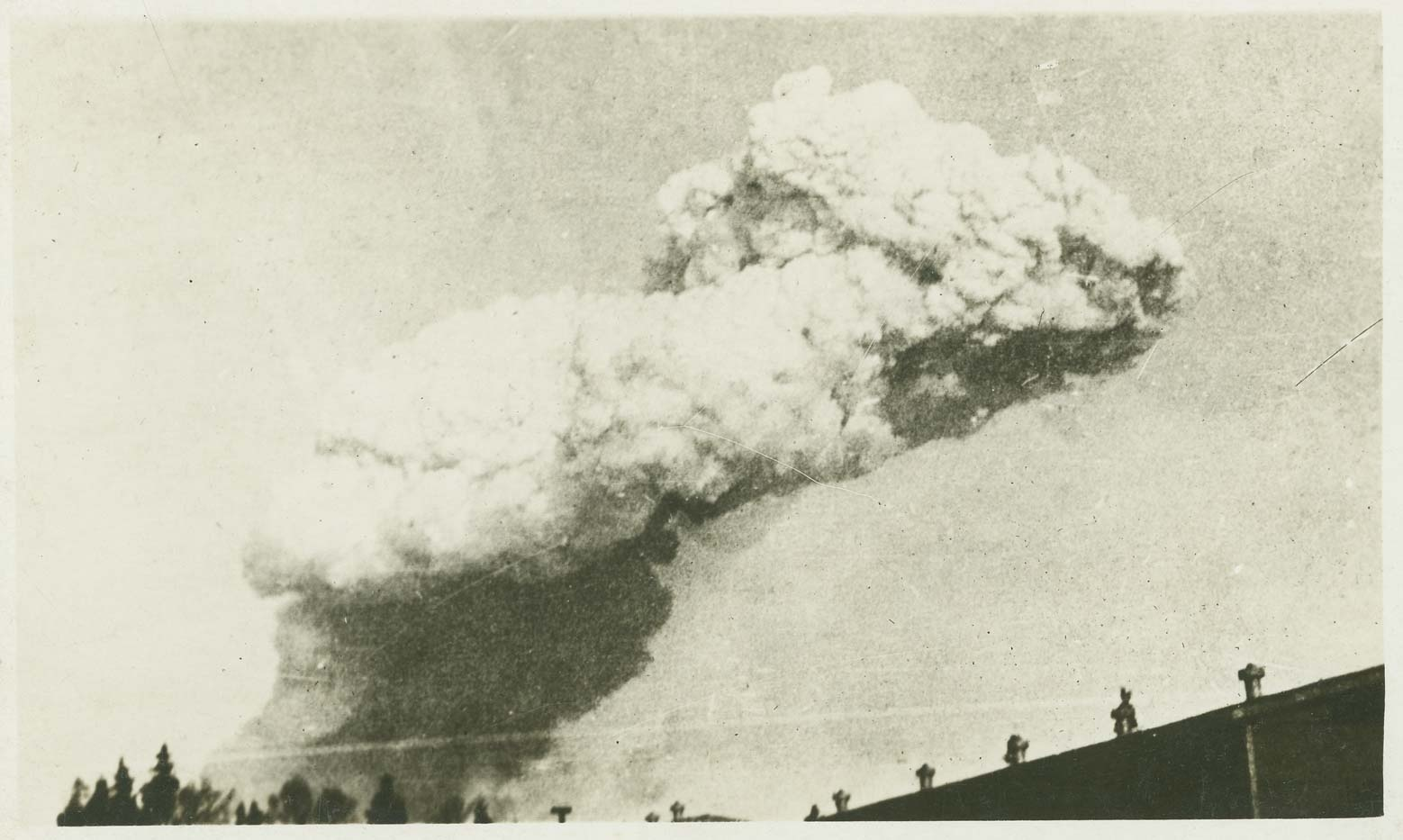
Blast cloud of the explosion

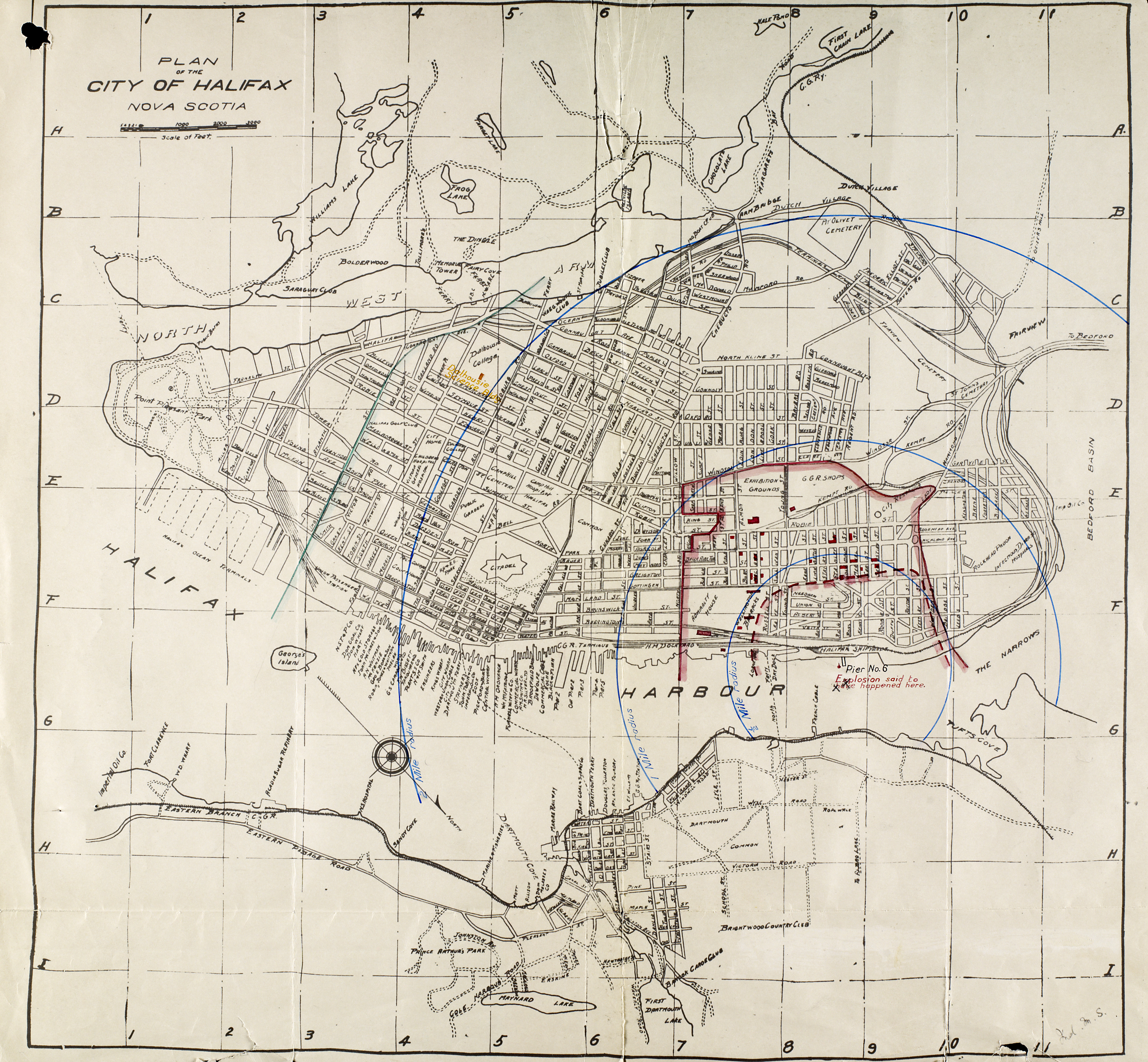
A map showing the radius of the explosion

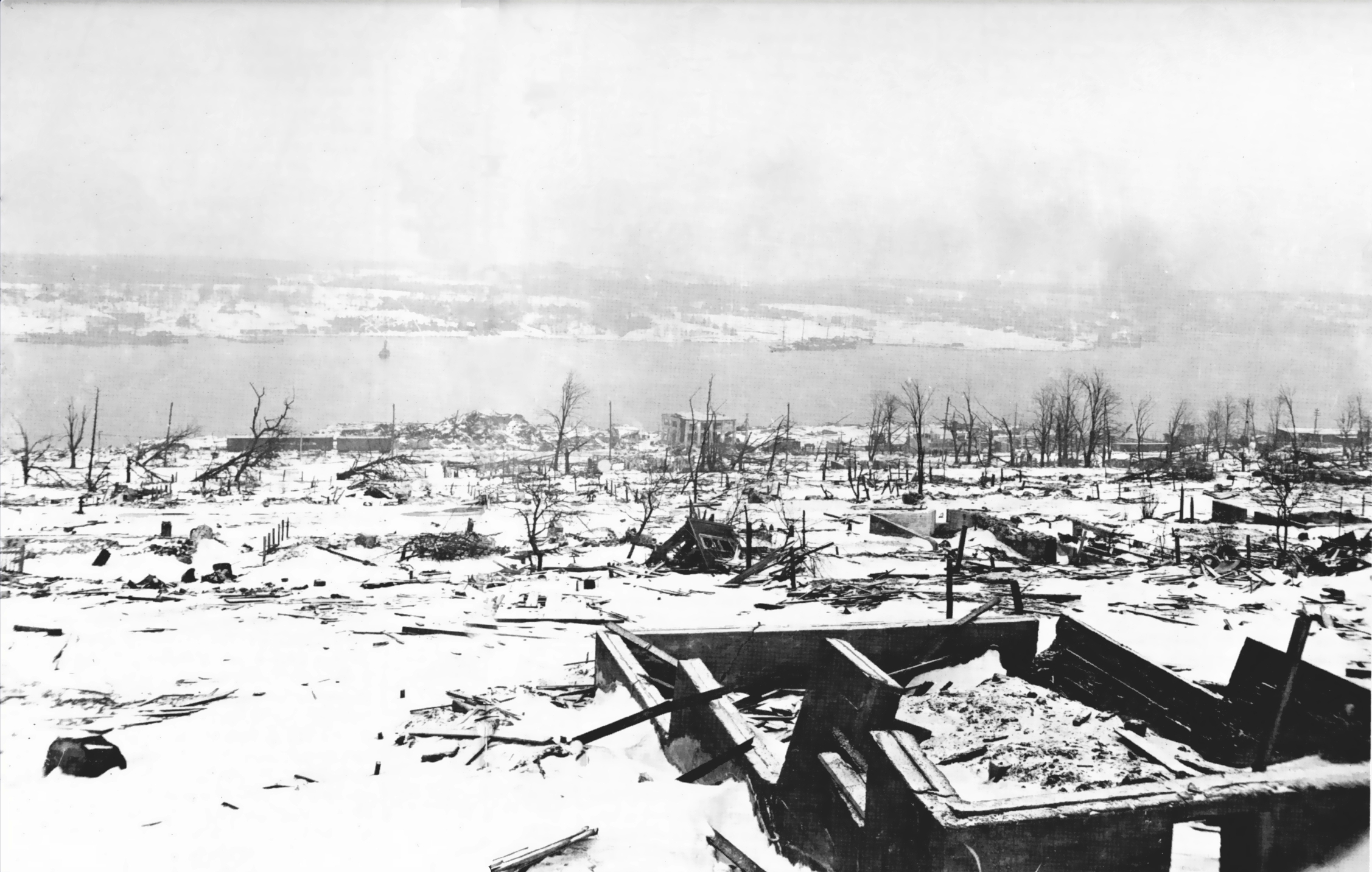
A view across the devastation of Halifax two days after the explosion, looking toward the Dartmouth side of the harbour: Imo is visible aground on the far side of the harbour.

At 9:04:35 am, the out-of-control fire on board Mont-Blanc set off her cargo of high explosives. The ship was completely blown apart and a powerful blast wave radiated from the explosion, initially at more than 1,000 metres (3,300 ft) per second. Temperatures of 5,000 °C (9,000 °F) and pressures of thousands of atmospheres accompanied the moment of detonation at the centre of the explosion. White-hot shards of iron fell down upon Halifax and Dartmouth.

A cloud of white smoke rose to at least 3,600 metres (2,000 fathoms; 11,800 ft). The blast was felt as far away as Cape Breton (207 kilometres or 129 miles) and Prince Edward Island (180 kilometres or 110 miles). An area of over 400 acres (1.6 km^{2}; 0.63 sq mi) was completely destroyed by the explosion, and the harbour floor was momentarily exposed by the volume of water that was displaced. A tsunami was formed by water surging in to fill the void; it rose as high as eighteen metres (59 ft) above the high-water mark on the Halifax side of the harbour. Imo was carried onto the shore at Dartmouth by the tsunami. The blast killed all but one on the whaler, everyone on the pinnace, and 21 of the 26 men on Stella Maris; she ended up on the Dartmouth shore, severely damaged. The captain's son, First Mate Walter Brannen, who had been thrown into the hold by the blast, survived, as did four others. All but one of Mont-Blanc's crew members survived.

The blast instantly killed more than 1,600 people and injured an additional 9,000, more than 300 of whom later died. It destroyed or badly damaged every building within a 2.6-kilometre (1.6 mi) radius, over 12,000 in total. Hundreds of people who had been watching the fire from their homes were blinded when the blast wave shattered the windows in front of them. Overturned stoves and lamps started fires throughout Halifax, particularly in the North End, where entire city blocks burned, trapping residents inside their houses. Firefighter Billy Wells, who was thrown away from the explosion and had his clothes torn from his body, described the devastation survivors faced: "The sight was awful, with people hanging out of windows dead. Some with their heads missing, and some thrown onto the overhead telegraph wires." He was the only member of the eight-man crew of the fire engine Patricia to survive.

Large brick and stone factories near Pier 6, such as the Acadia Sugar Refinery, disappeared into unrecognizable heaps of rubble, killing most of their workers. The Nova Scotia cotton mill located 1.5 km (0.93 mile) from the blast was destroyed by fire and the collapse of its concrete floors. The Royal Naval College of Canada building was badly damaged, and several cadets and instructors were maimed. The Richmond Railway Yards and station were destroyed, killing 55 railway workers and destroying and damaging over 500 railway cars. The North Street Station, one of the busiest in Canada, was badly damaged.

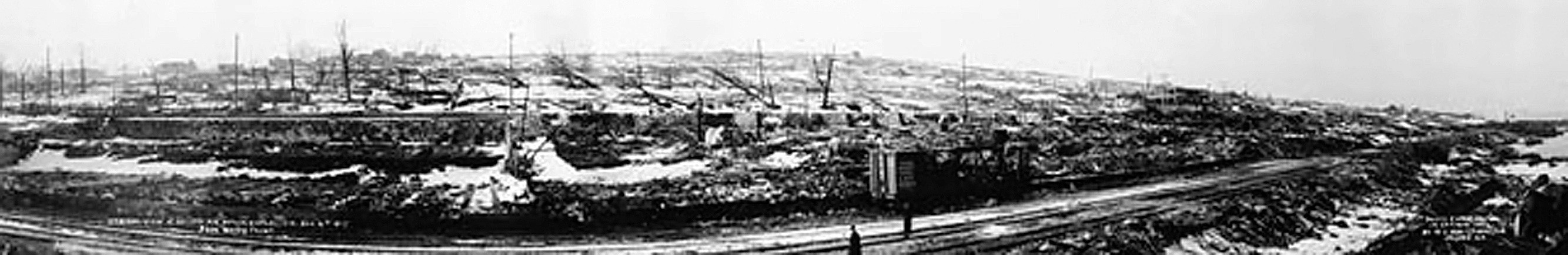
View from the waterfront looking west from the ruins of the Sugar Refinery across the obliterated Richmond District, several days after the explosion: The remains of Pier 6, site of the explosion, are on the far right.

The death toll could have been worse had it not been for the self-sacrifice of an Intercolonial Railway dispatcher, Patrick Vincent (Vince) Coleman, operating at the railyard about 230 metres (250 yd; 750 ft) from Pier 6, where the explosion occurred. His co-worker, William Lovett, and he learned of the dangerous cargo aboard the burning Mont-Blanc from a sailor and began to flee. Coleman remembered that an incoming passenger train from Saint John, New Brunswick, was due to arrive at the railyard within minutes. He returned to his post alone and continued to send out urgent telegraph messages to stop the train. Several variations of the message have been reported, among them this from the Maritime Museum of the Atlantic: "Hold up the train. Ammunition ship afire in harbor making for Pier 6 and will explode. Guess this will be my last message. Good-bye boys." Coleman's message was responsible for bringing all incoming trains around Halifax to a halt. It was heard by other stations all along the Intercolonial Railway, helping railway officials to respond immediately. Whether Coleman's warning was instrumental in halting the overnight train from Saint John a safe distance from the blast at Rockingham, saving the lives of about 300 railway passengers, is uncertain. However, it certainly sped the dispatch of relief to the blast site. Coleman was killed at his post.

== Rescue efforts ==
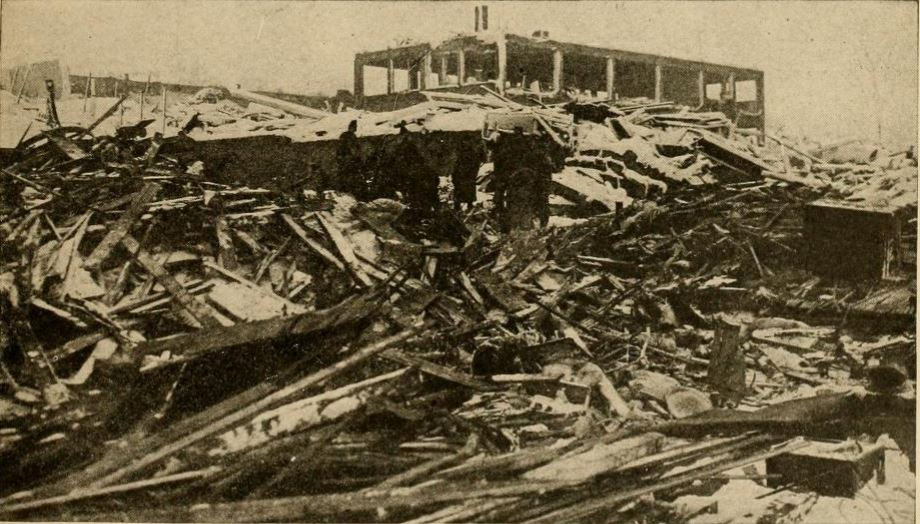
Aftermath in Halifax, the start of rescue efforts

External videos
- Surviving the disaster of the Halifax Explosion, 6:54, 1 December 1957, CBC Archive

First rescue efforts came from surviving neighbours and co-workers, who pulled and dug out victims from buildings. The initial informal response was soon joined by surviving policemen, firefighters, and military personnel who began to arrive, as did anyone with a working vehicle; cars, trucks and delivery wagons of all kinds were enlisted to collect the wounded. A flood of victims soon began to arrive at the city's hospitals, which were quickly overwhelmed. The new military hospital, Camp Hill, admitted about 1,400 victims on 6 December.

Firefighters were among the first to respond to the disaster, rushing to Mont-Blanc to attempt to extinguish the blaze before the explosion even occurred. They also played a role after the blast, with fire companies arriving to assist from across Halifax, and by the end of the day from as far away as Amherst, Nova Scotia, (200 kilometres or 120 miles) and Moncton, New Brunswick, (260 kilometres or 160 miles) on relief trains. Halifax Fire Department's West Street Station 2 was the first to arrive at Pier 6 with the crew of Patricia, the first motorized fire engine in Canada. In the final moments before the explosion, hoses were being unrolled as the fire spread to the docks. Nine members of the Halifax Fire Department lost their lives performing their duty that day.

Royal Navy cruisers in port sent some of the first organized rescue parties ashore. HMS Highflyer, along with the armed merchant cruisers HMS Changuinola, HMS Knight Templar, and HMS Calgarian, sent boats ashore with rescue parties and medical personnel and soon began to take wounded aboard. A US Coast Guard cutter, USRC Morrill, also sent a rescue party ashore. Out at sea, the American cruiser USS Tacoma and armed merchant cruiser USS Von Steuben (formerly SS Kronprinz Wilhelm) were passing Halifax en route to the United States. Tacoma was rocked so severely by the blast wave that her crew went to general quarters. Spotting the large and rising column of smoke, Tacoma altered course and arrived to assist rescue at 2 pm. Von Steuben arrived a half-hour later. The American steamship Old Colony, docked in Halifax for repairs, suffered little damage and was quickly converted to serve as a hospital ship, staffed by doctors and orderlies from the British and American navy vessels in the harbour.

Dazed survivors immediately feared that the explosion was the result of a bomb dropped from a German plane. Troops at gun batteries and barracks immediately turned out in case the city was under attack, but within an hour switched from defence to rescue roles as the cause and location of the explosion were determined. All available troops were called in from harbour fortifications and barracks to the North End to rescue survivors and provide transport to the city's hospitals, including the two army hospitals in the city.

Adding to the chaos were fears of a potential second explosion. A cloud of steam shot out of ventilators at the ammunition magazine at Wellington Barracks as naval personnel extinguished a fire by the magazine. The fire was quickly put out; the cloud was seen from blocks away and quickly led to rumours that another explosion was imminent. Uniformed officers ordered everyone away from the area. As the rumour spread across the city, many families fled their homes. The confusion hampered efforts for over two hours until fears were dispelled by about noon. Many rescuers ignored the evacuation, and naval rescue parties continued working uninterrupted at the harbour.

Surviving railway workers in the railyards at the heart of the disaster carried out rescue work, pulling people from the harbour and from under debris. The overnight train from Saint John was just approaching the city when hit by the blast but was only slightly damaged. It continued into Richmond until the track was blocked by wreckage. Passengers and soldiers aboard used the emergency tools from the train to dig people out of houses and bandaged them with sheets from the sleeping cars. The train was loaded with injured and left the city at 1:30 with a doctor aboard, to evacuate the wounded to Truro.

Led by Lieutenant Governor MacCallum Grant, leading citizens formed the Halifax Relief Commission at around noon. The committee organized members in charge of organizing medical relief for both Halifax and Dartmouth, supplying transportation, food, and shelter, and covering medical and funeral costs for victims. The commission would continue until 1976, participating in reconstruction and relief efforts and later distributing pensions to survivors. Men and women turned out to serve in roles from hospital aides to shelter staff, while children contributed to the relief effort by carrying messages from site to site. Community facilities like the Young Men's Christian Association (YMCA) were rapidly converted to emergency hospital facilities with medical students providing care.

Rescue trains were dispatched from across Atlantic Canada, as well as the northeastern United States. The first left Truro around 10 am carrying medical personnel and supplies, arrived in Halifax by noon, and returned to Truro with the wounded and homeless by 3 pm. The track had become impassable after Rockingham, on the western edge of Bedford Basin. To reach the wounded, rescue personnel had to walk through parts of the devastated city until they reached a point where the military had begun to clear the streets. By nightfall, a dozen trains had reached Halifax from the Nova Scotian towns of Truro, Kentville, Amherst, Stellarton, Pictou, and Sydney and from New Brunswick, including the town of Sackville and the cities of Moncton and Saint John.

Relief efforts were hampered the following day by a blizzard that blanketed Halifax with 16 inches (41 cm) of heavy snow. Trains en route from other parts of Canada and from the United States were stalled in snowdrifts, and telegraph lines that had been hastily repaired following the explosion were again knocked down. Halifax was isolated by the storm, and while rescue committees were forced to suspend the search for survivors, the storm also aided efforts to put out fires throughout the city.

== Destruction and loss of life ==
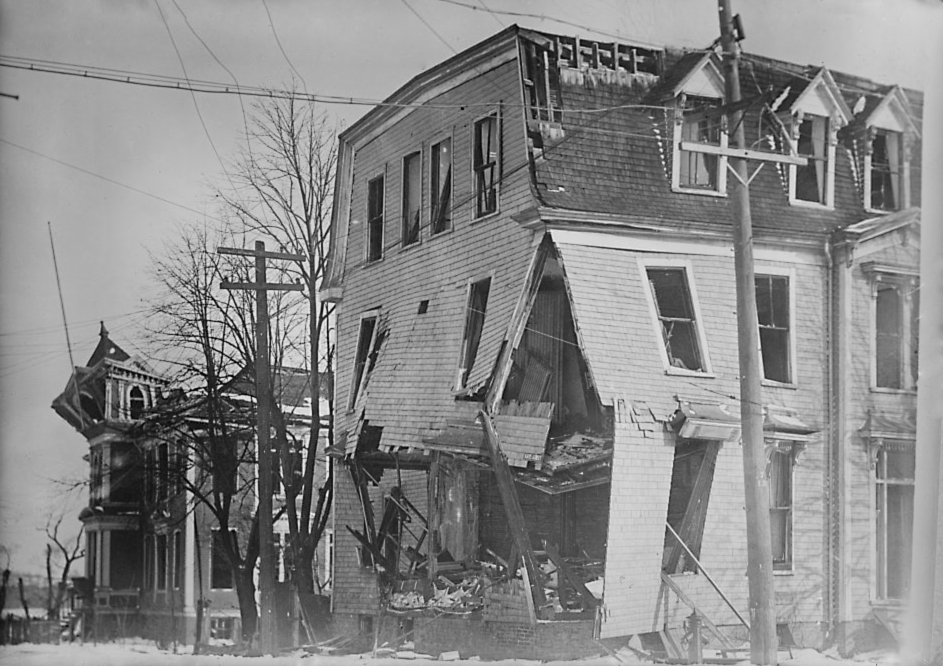
Explosion aftermath: St. Joseph's Convent, located on the southeast corner of Göttingen and Kaye streets

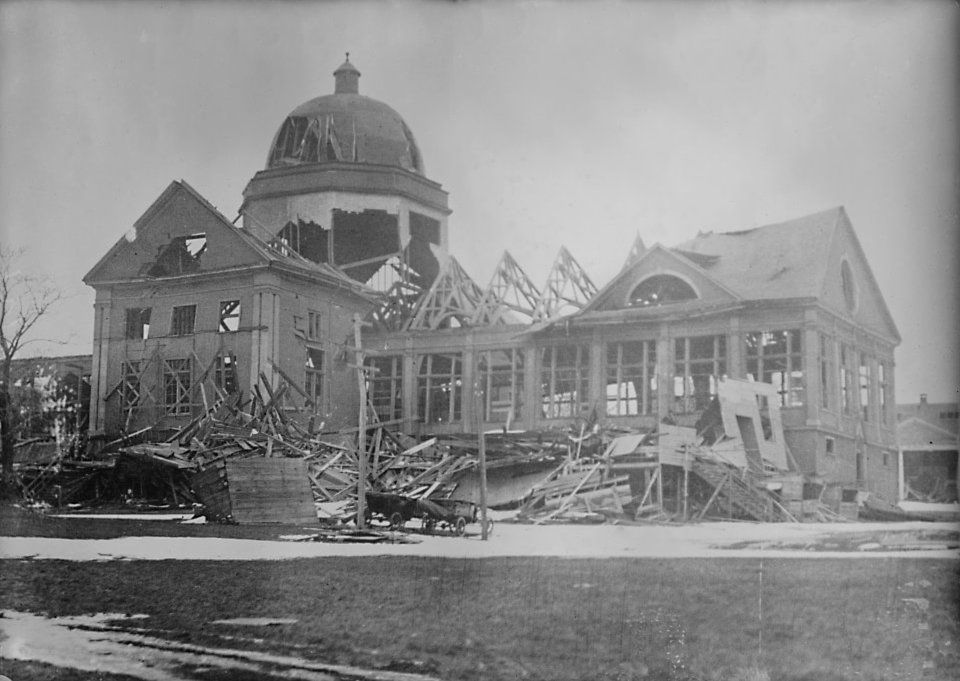
Explosion aftermath: Halifax's Exhibition Building. The final body from the explosion was found here in 1919.

The exact number killed by the disaster is unknown. The Halifax Explosion Remembrance Book, an official database of the Nova Scotia Archives and Records Management, identified 1,782 victims. As many as 1,600 people died immediately in the blast, tsunami, and collapse of buildings. The last body, a caretaker killed at the Exhibition Grounds, was not recovered until summer 1919. An additional 9,000 were injured; 1,630 homes were destroyed in the explosion and fires, and another 12,000 damaged; roughly 6,000 people were left homeless and 25,000 had insufficient shelter. The city's industrial sector was in large part gone, with many workers among the casualties and the dockyard heavily damaged.

A mortuary committee chaired by Alderman R. B. Coldwell was quickly formed at Halifax City Hall on the morning of the disaster. The Chebucto Road School (now the Maritime Conservatory of Performing Arts) in Halifax's west end was chosen as a central morgue. A company of the Royal Canadian Engineers repaired and converted the basement of the school to serve as a morgue and classrooms to serve as offices for the Halifax coroner. Trucks and wagons soon began to arrive with bodies. Arthur S. Barnstead took over from Coldwell as the morgue went into operation and implemented a system based on the one his father, John Henry Barnstead, developed to catalogue the dead in the aftermath of the Titanic disaster of 1912. Many of the wounds inflicted by the blast were permanently debilitating, such as those caused by flying glass or by the flash of the explosion. Thousands of people had stopped to watch the ship burning in the harbour, many from inside buildings, leaving them directly in the path of glass fragments from shattered windows. According to an article in the British Journal of Ophthalmology, ophthalmologists responding to the disaster performed 249 enucleations; 16 people had both eyes removed.

An estimated CA$35 million in damage resulted (CA$727 million today). About $30 million in financial aid was raised from various sources, including $18 million from the federal government, over $4 million from the British government, and $750,000 from the Commonwealth of Massachusetts.

=== Dartmouth ===
Dartmouth was not as densely populated as Halifax and was separated from the blast by the width of the harbour, but still suffered heavy damage. An estimated 100 people died on the Dartmouth side. Windows were shattered and many buildings were damaged or destroyed, including the Oland Brewery and parts of the Starr Manufacturing Company. Nova Scotia Hospital was the only hospital in Dartmouth, and many of the victims were treated there.

=== Mi'kmaq settlement ===
There were small enclaves of Mi'kmaq in and around the coves of Bedford Basin on the Dartmouth shore. Directly opposite to Pier 9 on the Halifax side sat a community in Tufts Cove, which included the Mi'kmaq community of Turtle Grove. In the years and months preceding the explosion, the Department of Indian Affairs had been actively trying to force the Mi'kmaq to give up their land and move to a reserve, but this had not occurred by the time of the explosion. Turtle Grove was close to the centre of the blast, and the physical structures of the settlement were obliterated by the explosion and tsunami. A precise Mi'kmaq death toll is unknown as the Department of Indian Affairs and census records for the community were incomplete. Nine bodies were recovered from Turtle Grove and there were eleven known survivors. The Halifax Remembrance Book lists 16 members of the Tufts Cove Community as dead; not all the dead listed as in Tufts Cove were Indigenous. The Turtle Grove settlement was not rebuilt in the wake of the disaster. Survivors were housed in a racially segregated building under generally poor conditions and most were eventually dispersed around Nova Scotia.

=== Africville ===
The Black community of Africville, on the southern shores of Bedford Basin adjacent to the Halifax Peninsula, was spared the direct force of the blast by the shadow effect of the raised ground to the south. However, Africville's homes were heavily damaged by the explosion. Families recorded the deaths of four residents. A combination of persistent racism and a growing conviction that Africville should be demolished to make way for industrial development resulted in the people of Africville receiving no police or fire protection; they had to make do without water mains and sewer lines, despite paying city taxes. Africville received little of the donated relief funds and none of the progressive reconstruction invested in other parts of the city after the explosion.

== Investigation ==
Many people in Halifax first thought the explosion to be the result of a German attack. The Halifax Herald continued to propagate this belief for some time, reporting, for example, that Germans had mocked victims of the explosion. While John Johansen, the Norwegian helmsman of Imo, was being treated for serious injuries sustained during the explosion, he was reported to the military police as behaving suspiciously. Johansen was arrested on suspicions of being a German spy when a search turned up a letter on his person, supposedly written in German. The letter turned out to have been written in Norwegian. Immediately following the explosion, most of the German survivors in Halifax had been rounded up and imprisoned. Eventually, the fear dissipated as the real cause of the explosion became known, although rumours of German involvement persisted.

A judicial inquiry known as the Wreck Commissioner's Inquiry was formed to investigate the causes of the collision. Proceedings began at the Halifax Court House on 13 December 1917, presided over by Justice Arthur Drysdale. The inquiry's report of 4 February 1918 blamed Mont-Blanc's captain, Aimé Le Médec, the ship's pilot, Francis Mackey, and Commander F. Evan Wyatt, the Royal Canadian Navy's chief examining officer in charge of the harbour, gates and anti-submarine defences, for causing the collision. Drysdale agreed with Dominion Wreck Commissioner L. A. Demers' opinion that "it was the Mont-Blanc's responsibility alone to ensure that she avoided a collision at all costs" given her cargo; he was likely influenced by local opinion, which was strongly anti-French, as well as by the "street fighter" style of argumentation used by Imo lawyer Charles Burchell. According to Crown counsel W. A. Henry, this was "a great surprise to most people", who had expected the Imo to be blamed for being on the wrong side of the channel. All three men were charged with manslaughter and criminal negligence at a preliminary hearing heard by Stipendiary Magistrate Richard A. McLeod and bound over for trial. A Nova Scotia Supreme Court justice, Benjamin Russell, found no evidence to support these charges. Mackey was discharged on a writ of habeas corpus and the charges dropped. Because the pilot and the captain were arrested on the same warrant, the charges against Le Médec were also dismissed. Commander Wyatt, charged on a separate warrant, was the only one of the three who was indicted. On 17 April 1918, a jury acquitted Wyatt in a trial that lasted less than a day.

Drysdale oversaw the first civil litigation trial, in which the owners of the two ships sought damages from each other. His decision (27 April 1918) found Mont-Blanc entirely at fault. Subsequent appeals to the Supreme Court of Canada (19 May 1919), and the Judicial Committee of the Privy Council in London (22 March 1920), determined Mont-Blanc and Imo were equally to blame for navigational errors that led to the collision. No party was ever convicted for any crime or otherwise successfully prosecuted for any actions that precipitated the disaster.

== Reconstruction ==
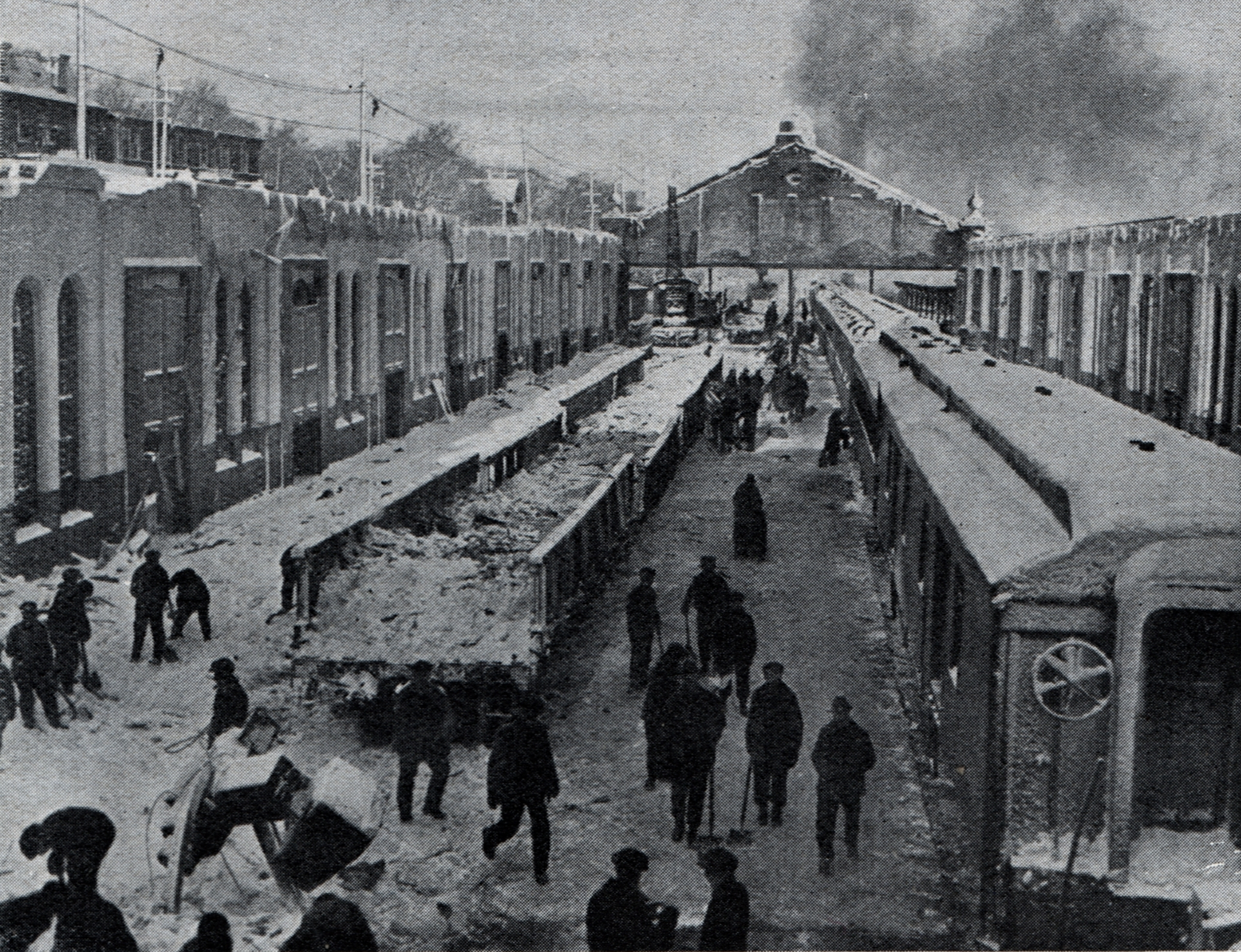
Workers clear debris from the North Street Station

Efforts began shortly after the explosion to clear debris, repair buildings, and establish temporary housing for survivors left homeless by the explosion. By late January 1918, around 5,000 were still without shelter. A reconstruction committee under Colonel Robert Low constructed 832 new housing units, which were furnished by the Massachusetts-Halifax Relief Fund.

Partial train service resumed from a temporary rail terminal in the city's South End on 7 December. Full service resumed on 9 December when tracks were cleared and the North Street Station reopened. The Canadian Government Railways created a special unit to clear and repair railway yards, as well as rebuild railway piers and the Naval Dockyard. Most piers returned to operation by late December and were repaired by January.

The North End Halifax neighbourhood of Richmond bore the brunt of the explosion. In 1917, Richmond was considered a working-class neighbourhood and had few paved roads. After the explosion, the Halifax Relief Commission approached the reconstruction of Richmond as an opportunity to improve and modernize the city's North End. English town planner Thomas Adams and Montreal architectural firm Ross and Macdonald were recruited to design a new housing plan for Richmond. Adams, inspired by the Victorian garden city movement, aimed to provide public access to green spaces and to create a low-rise, low-density, and multifunctional urban neighbourhood.

The planners designed 326 large homes that each faced a tree-lined, paved boulevard. They specified that the homes be built with a new and innovative fireproof material, blocks of compressed cement called Hydrostone. The first of these homes was occupied by March 1919, just a few months before Prince Edward, Prince of Wales, visited the site on 17 August, touring many of the houses and hearing stories about the effects of the tragedy and "of the kindness of the people who quickly came to their aid." Once finished, the Hydrostone neighbourhood consisted of homes, businesses, and parks, which helped create a new sense of community in the North End of Halifax. It has now become an upscale neighbourhood and shopping district. In contrast, the equally poor and underdeveloped area of Africville was not included in reconstruction efforts.

Every building in the Halifax dockyard required some degree of rebuilding, as did HMCS Niobe and the docks themselves; all of the RCN's minesweepers and patrol boats were undamaged. Prime Minister Robert Borden, who was also the MP for Halifax, pledged that the government would be "co-operating in every way to reconstruct the Port of Halifax: this was of utmost importance to the Empire". Captain Symington of USS Tacoma speculated that the port would not be operational for months, but a convoy departed on 11 December and dockyard operations resumed before Christmas.

== Legacy ==
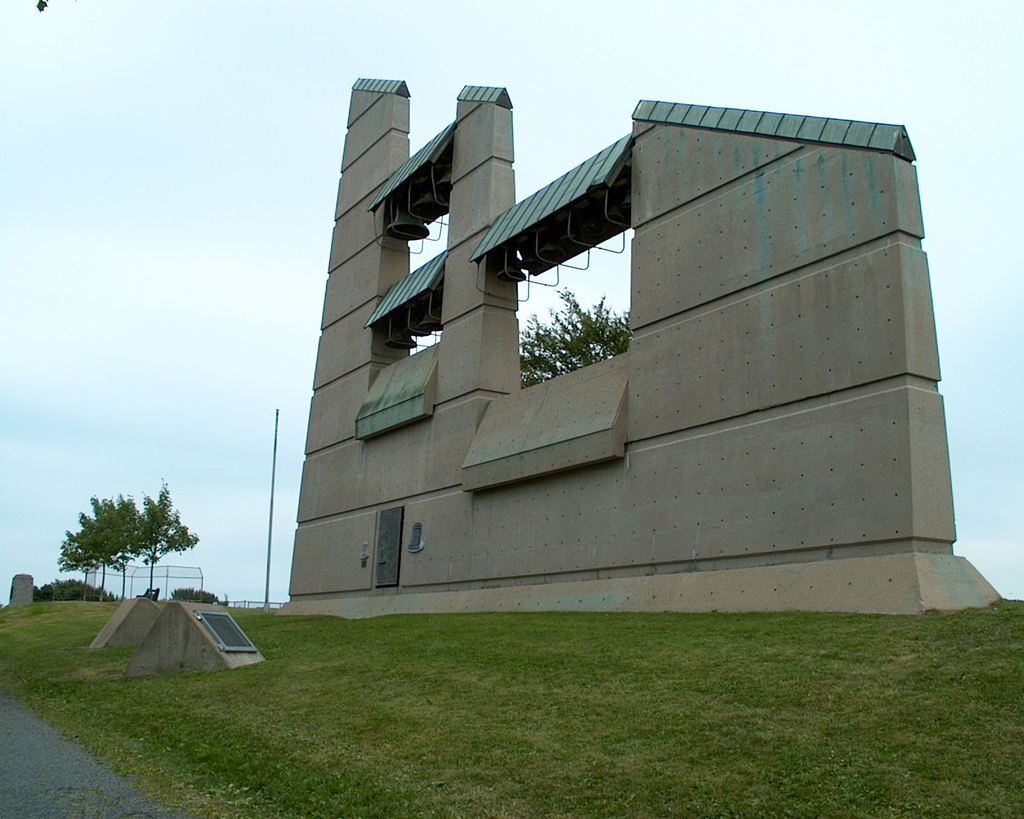
The Halifax Explosion Memorial Bell Tower

The Halifax Explosion was one of the largest artificial non-nuclear explosions. An extensive comparison of 130 major explosions by Halifax historian Jay White in 1994 concluded that it "remains unchallenged in overall magnitude as long as five criteria are considered together: number of casualties, force of blast, radius of devastation, quantity of explosive material, and total value of property destroyed." For many years afterwards, the Halifax Explosion was the standard by which all large blasts were measured. For instance, in its report on the atomic bombing of Hiroshima, Time wrote that the explosive power of the Little Boy bomb was seven times that of the Halifax Explosion.

The many eye injuries resulting from the disaster led to better understanding of how to care for damaged eyes, and "with the recently formed Canadian National Institute for the Blind, Halifax became internationally known as a centre for care for the blind", according to Dalhousie University professor Victoria Allen. Coordinated assistance from the Perkins School also provided support during the recovery period. The lack of coordinated pediatric care in such a disaster was noted by William Ladd, a surgeon from Boston, who had arrived to help. His insights from the explosion are generally credited with inspiring him to pioneer the specialty of pediatric surgery in North America. The Halifax Explosion inspired a series of health reforms, including around public sanitation and maternity care.

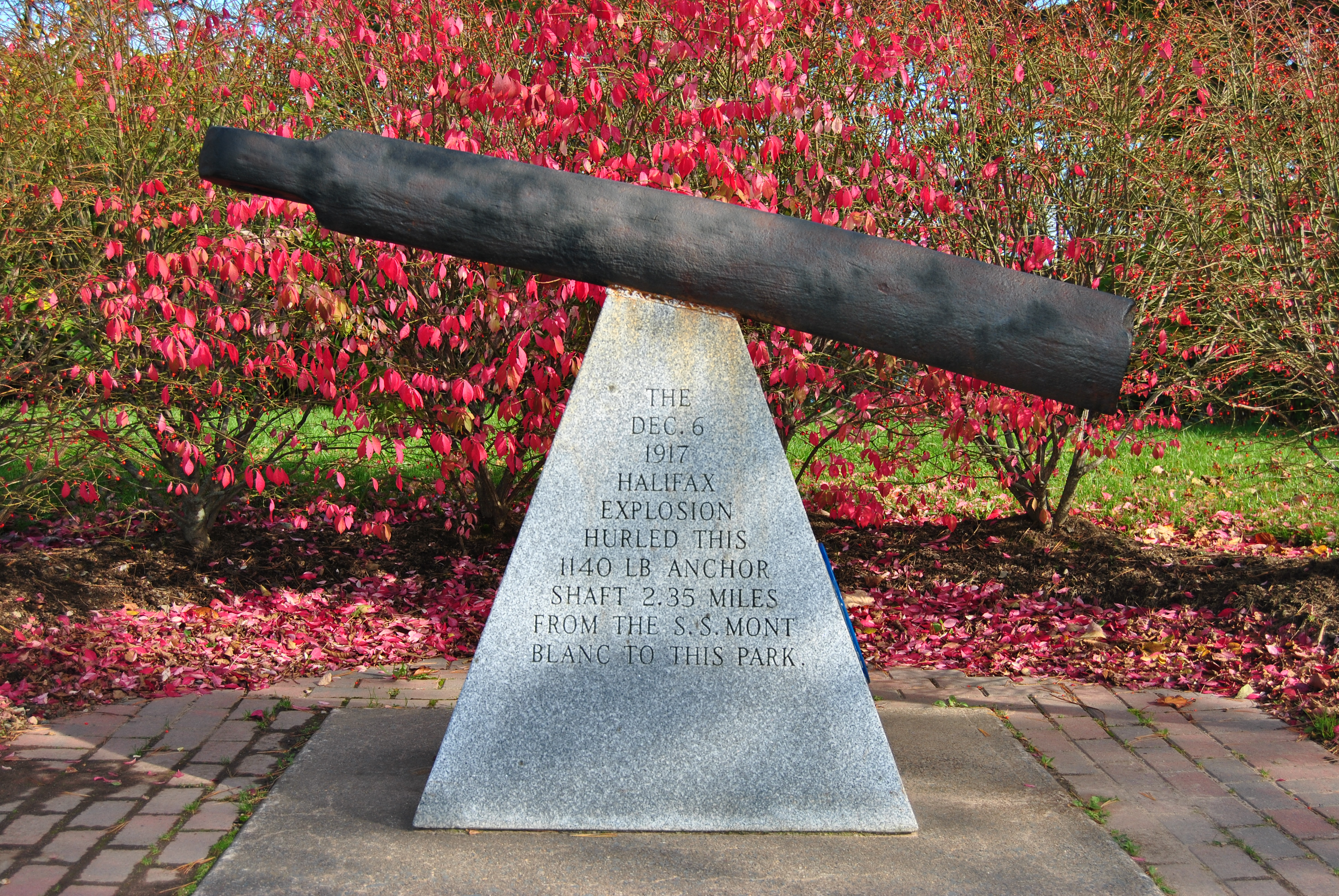
Mont Blanc anchor site

The event was traumatic for the whole surviving community, so the memory was largely suppressed. After the first anniversary, the city stopped commemorating the explosion for decades. The second official commemoration did not take place before the 50th anniversary in 1967, and even after that, the activities stopped again. Construction began in 1964 on the Halifax North Memorial Library, designed to commemorate the victims of the explosion. The library entrance featured the first monument built to mark the explosion, the Halifax Explosion Memorial Sculpture, created by artist Jordi Bonet. The sculpture was dismantled by the Halifax Regional Municipality in 2004.

The Halifax Explosion Memorial Bells were built in 1985, relocating memorial carillon bells from a nearby church to a large concrete sculpture on Fort Needham Hill, facing the "ground zero" area of the explosion. The Bell Tower is the location of an annual civic ceremony every 6 December. A memorial at Halifax Fire Station No. 4 on Lady Hammond Road honours the firefighters killed while responding to the explosion. Fragments of Mont-Blanc have been mounted as neighbourhood monuments to the explosion at Albro Lake Road in Dartmouth, at Regatta Point, and elsewhere in the area. Simple monuments mark the mass graves of explosion victims at the Fairview Lawn Cemetery and the Bayers Road Cemetery. A Memorial Book listing the names of all the known victims is displayed at the Halifax North Memorial Library and the Maritime Museum of the Atlantic, which has a large permanent exhibit about the Halifax Explosion. Harold Gilman was commissioned to create a painting memorializing the event. According to the art historian Helena Bonett, Gilman's work, Halifax Harbour at Sunset, "tells very little about the recent devastation, as the viewpoint is set back so that the harbour appears undisturbed".

Hugh MacLennan's novel Barometer Rising (1941), set in Halifax at the time of the explosion, includes a carefully researched description of its effect on the city. Following in MacLennan's footsteps, journalist Robert MacNeil penned Burden of Desire (1992) and used the explosion as a metaphor for the societal and cultural changes of the day. MacLennan and MacNeil's use of the romance genre to fictionalize the explosion is similar to the first attempt by Lieutenant-Colonel Frank McKelvey Bell, author of the novella A Romance of the Halifax Disaster (1918). This work follows the love affair of a young woman and an injured soldier. Keith Ross Leckie wrote a miniseries entitled Shattered City: The Halifax Explosion (2003), which took the title but has no relationship to Janet Kitz's non-fiction book Shattered City: The Halifax Explosion and the Road to Recovery (1990). The film was criticized for distortions and inaccuracies.

The response to the explosion from Boston and the appreciation in Halifax cemented ongoing warm Boston–Halifax relations. In 1918, Halifax sent a Christmas tree to Boston in thanks and remembrance for the help that the Boston Red Cross and the Massachusetts Public Safety Committee provided immediately after the disaster. That gift was revived in 1971 by the Lunenburg County Christmas Tree Producers Association, which began an annual donation of a large tree to promote Christmas tree exports, as well as acknowledge Boston's support after the explosion. The gift was later taken over by the Nova Scotia government to continue the goodwill gesture and to promote trade and tourism. The tree is Boston's official Christmas tree and is lit on Boston Common throughout the holiday season. In deference to its symbolic importance for both cities, the Nova Scotia Department of Natural Resources has specific guidelines for selecting the tree and has tasked an employee to oversee the selection.

== See also ==
- List of accidents and incidents involving transport or storage of ammunition
- Bedford Magazine explosion in Halifax area (1945)
