= Burden of Desire =

1992 book written by Robert MacNeil

- Cover
- Author: Robert MacNeil
- Language: English
- Publication date: 1992

Burden of Desire (1992) is a large mass-market book based on the Halifax Explosion of 1917 written by Canadian-born journalist Robert MacNeil. MacNeil, who hosted the MacNeil/Lehrer NewsHour, has also published other fiction and non-fiction books including The Story of English (1986), Breaking News (1999) and Wordstruck: A Memoir (1989).

Burden of Desire centres on the love triangle of bohemian belle Julia Montgomery Robertson, Freudian professor Stewart MacPherson, and Anglican minister Peter Wentworth. Julia pens a diary detailing her sexual fantasies, which falls into the hands of both Peter and Stewart after the Halifax Explosion. Writing into the diary at the moment of the blast, Julia hides the book into a coat, which is later donated to Peter who is collecting on behalf of suddenly homeless Haligonians from the north end of the city.

The novel explores the repression and expression of sexual desire during the 1910s, as well as contemporary issues such as posttraumatic stress disorder, postnatal depression, heroism, Freudian Psychoanalysis, and Modern art. Not only does the novel look at how Haligonians are affected by the disaster, Burden of Desire provides an intimate look into society at the time - although it focuses mostly on the middle to upper classes of the south end of the Halifax peninsula, which was not affected as traumatically by the explosion as was the north end of the city.
