= Richmond, Nova Scotia =

Former development in Halifax, Nova Scotia

Coordinates: 44°39′59.7″N 63°35′54.7″W

Richmond was a Canadian urban community occupying the northern extremity of the peninsular City of Halifax. (Now part of the Halifax Regional Municipality.) It was the epicentre of the Halifax Explosion of 6 December 1917, the worst disaster in Canadian history, in which as many as 2000 people died and thousands more were injured. From the 1770s, Richmond was home to Fort Needham, and in 1819, Richmond Grove (lower Duffus Street) was the site of the famous fatal duel between Richard John Uniacke Jr. and William Bowie.

== History ==
Originally farm and forestland, the quartier of Richmond grew up in the 1820s. Situated on the western shore of the Narrows of Halifax Harbour, it began to industrialize in the 1850s after the Nova Scotia Railway was built along the shore to serve the dockyard as well as various shipping piers, factories and warehouses.

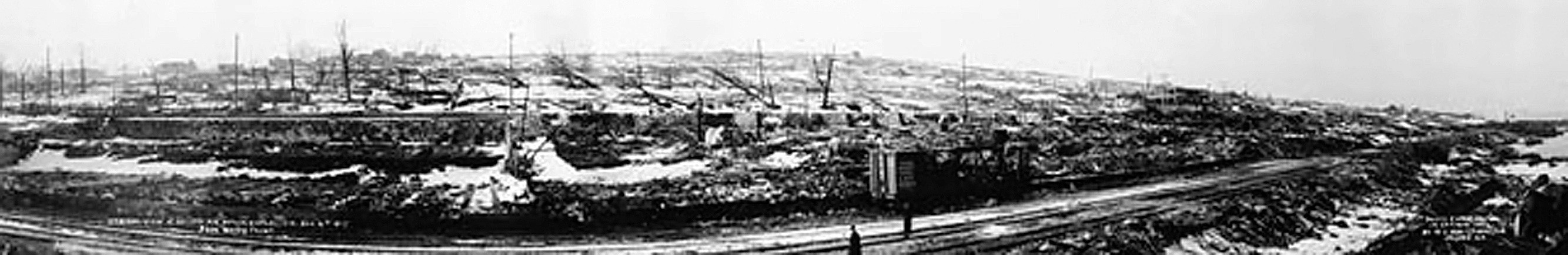
The Richmond neighbourhood of Halifax was obliterated as a result of the 1917 Halifax Explosion. Pier 6, ground zero of the explosion, is on the extreme right.

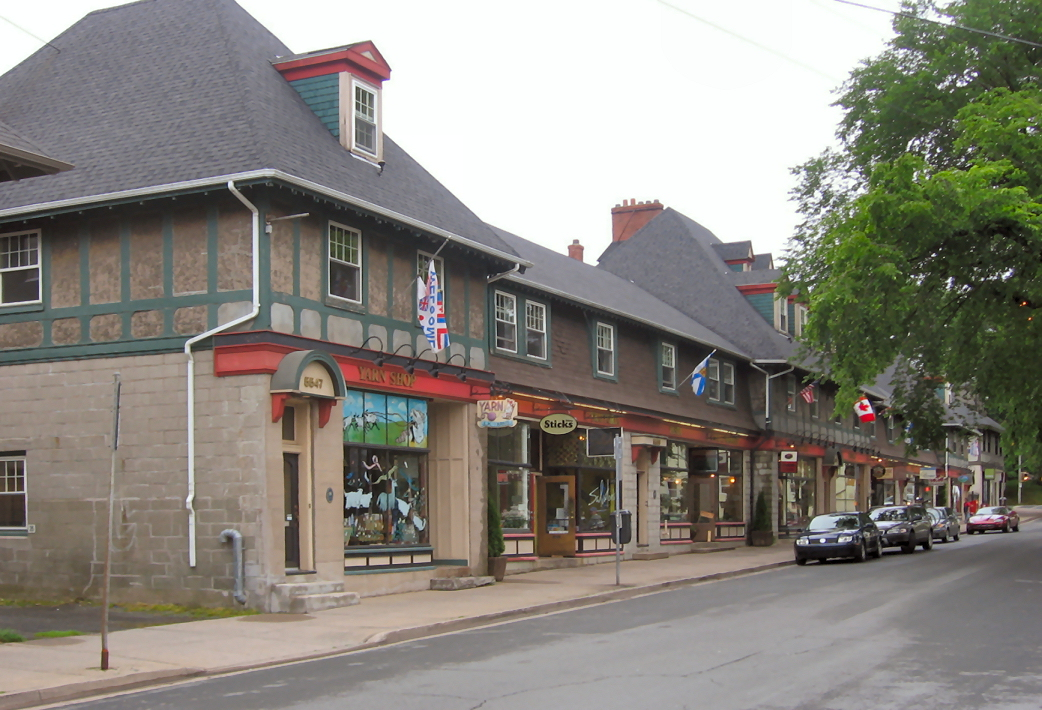
The Hydrostone District was built to replace buildings devastated by the Halifax Explosion.

Richmond was devastated when the Halifax Explosion levelled much of its buildings and infrastructure. The Halifax Relief Commission, established by federal order-in-council on 22 January 1918, was afterwards incorporated provincially and given uniquely broad powers by act of the Nova Scotia Legislature. The government of Canada’s $21,000,000 relief fund was used to rebuild the Devastated Area as the commission saw fit.

Thomas Adams, the renowned British town planner, was hired by the commission to design Richmond’s reconstruction. Among his achievements was a housing estate, Richmond Heights (The Hydrostone), which formed an integral part of rebuilt Richmond and provided leasehold residences to victims of the disaster whose homes had been destroyed.

Reconstruction of the Devastated Area began the rebirth of Richmond, but the sense of community was slow to re-emerge. Throughout the interwar years Richmond remained underdeveloped and depopulated. By no means all of its former inhabitants who survived the disaster returned there to live. The HRC’s post-war divestiture of the “Hydrostone” housing estate and Richmond’s gradual reintegration into the city of Halifax promoted its revival.

Though no longer industrial, and robbed of its name, Richmond eventually became the cohesive community it had been before the disaster. The name was lost because new Richmond was not continuous with old Richmond. The latter was a well-established working-class community which boasted four churches and three schools. The former was an urban renewal project which a professional town planner was commissioned to undertake. New Richmond was the creation not of its people but of the Halifax Relief Commission.
