= Culture of Halifax, Nova Scotia =

Overview of the culture of Halifax (Canada)

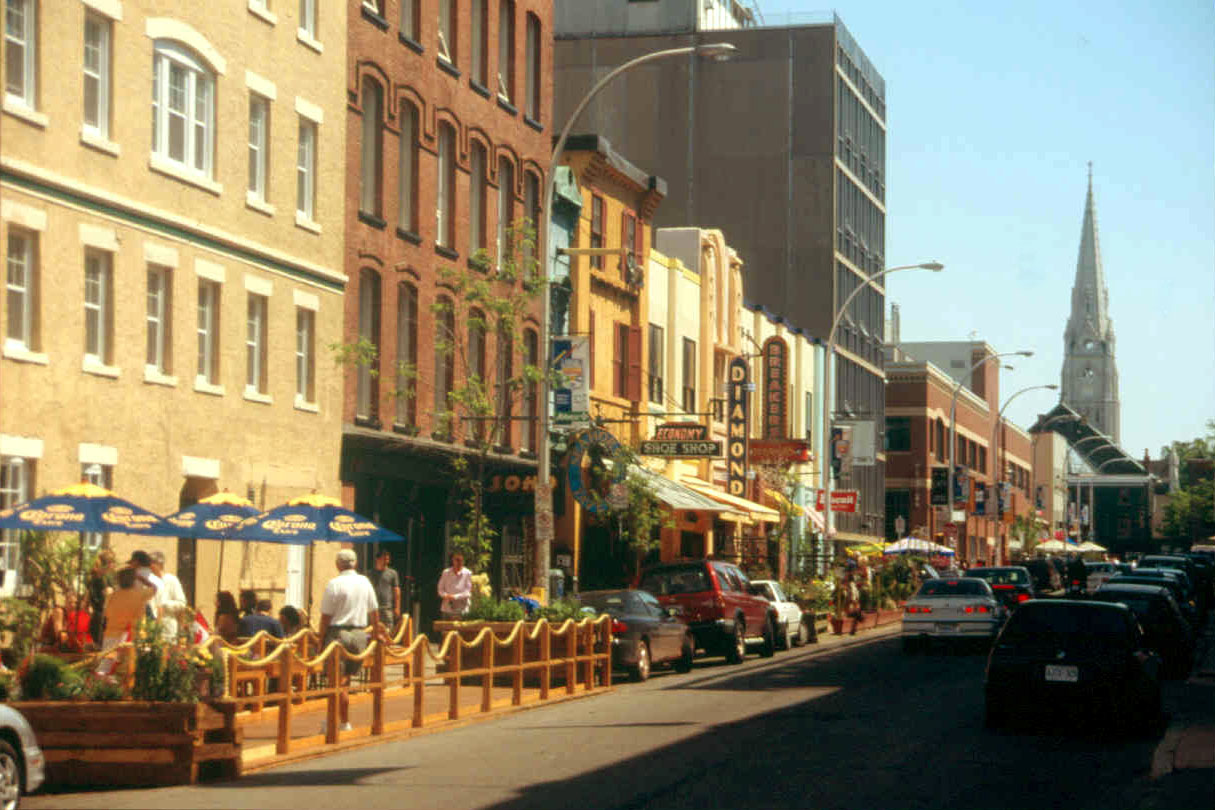
Argyle Street in downtown Halifax.

Halifax Regional Municipality is home to an arts and culture community that enjoys considerable support and participation from the general population. Cultural production in the region is increasingly recognized for its cultural and economic benefits. As the municipality's population has substantially grown, as has its diversity. African Nova Scotians, Asian Nova Scotians, Indigenous Nova Scotians, Latinx Nova Scotians and Mi'kmaq Nova Scotians influence much of the local culture of the regional municipality.

== The Arts ==
=== Exhibits ===
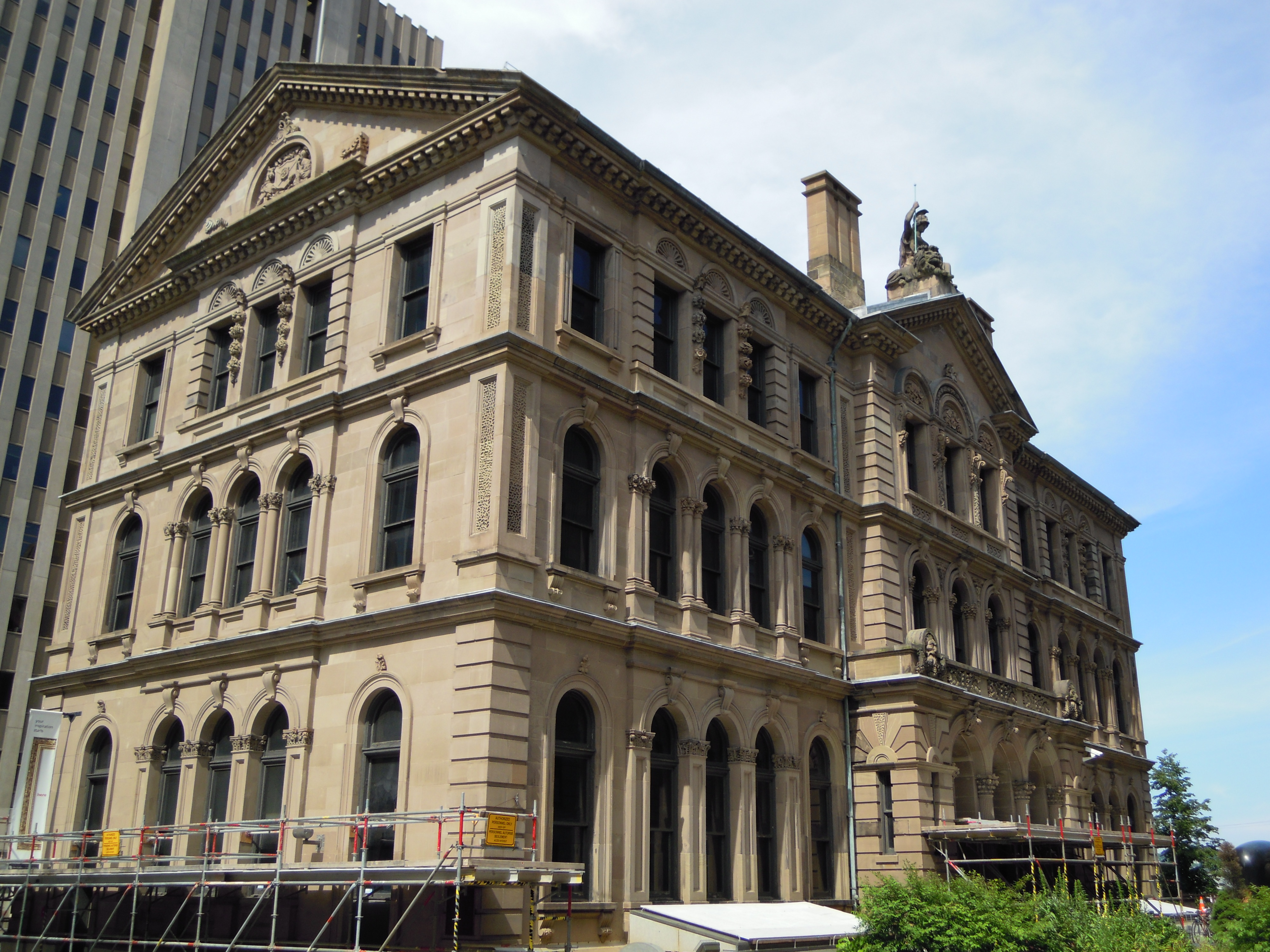
Art Gallery of Nova Scotia

Halifax is a hub for the visual arts, home to a celebrated school for art and design as well as more than thirty art galleries.

Many Halifax universities operate their own art galleries. The Nova Scotia College of Art and Design University (NSCAD), since its founding in 1887 as the Victoria School of Art and Design, has had a major influence on the visual arts in Nova Scotia, particularly in urban Halifax. Many NSCAD graduates remain in Halifax and practice as ceramicists, film-makers, graphic designers, jewelers, muralists, photographers, and weavers. NSCAD has its own exhibition space, the Anna Leonowens Gallery in Historic Properties.

At Dalhousie University, the Dalhousie Art Gallery within the Dalhousie Arts Centre is the oldest public art gallery in Nova Scotia, established in 1953.

Saint Mary's University have hosted an art exhibition since 1967 in the foyer of its former library - now its current Education building. In 1971, as the Loyola residence was finished, the main floor became host to its current gallery location. The permanent collection features over 2,000 works.

With a purpose-built space opened in 1971, Mount Saint Vincent University is home to the MSVU Art Gallery, which is a free, public gallery which serves the university, Metropolitan Halifax, and beyond. Many of the gallery's works can be viewed in the E. Margaret Fulton Communications Centre or other places on its campus.

Halifax has a multitude of galleries, both public and private, including the Art Gallery of Nova Scotia. The gallery is housed in a 6,200 square metres (67,000 sq ft) facility with a permanent collection of more than 19,000 items. Private galleries include Eye Level Gallery, Zwickers Gallery, and Studio 21. There are numerous works of public art on display in the urban area.

=== Film ===
The Atlantic Filmmakers Cooperative, founded in 1974, is the oldest English-speaking film co-op in Canada. It is a member-run registered charity that offers equipment and facilities to aid in film making. The cooperative also runs the Halifax Independent Filmmakers Festival, which celebrated its twentieth anniversary in 2026.

The Centre for Art Tapes (CFAT) facilitates artists working with electronic media including video, audio, and new media. Founded in 1979, it is a charitable, not-for-profit organization which works with artists at all levels. Their vision statement:

CFAT is an inclusive artist-run centre that supports artists who use video, audio, and electronic media to express ideas and stories that are under-represented in mainstream culture. CFAT is devoted to the exchange of ideas among diverse artists through experimentation, mentorship, presentation, and research.

— The Centre for Art Tapes, Who We Are, para. 2.

Halifax has become a film-making centre, with many American and Canadian filmmakers using the urban core's streetscapes often to stand in for other cities that are more expensive to work in. The municipality's port status also makes it a popular location for films about ships; scenes from the films Titanic (1997), Amelia (2009), and Hobo with a Shotgun (2011) were all filmed in the region, as well as numerous silver-screen movies and various documentaries.

=== Music ===
The musical scene in Halifax greatly varies. Halifax Regional Municipality is occasionally included in the tours of top-grossing concert acts which include Acadian traditional, Celtic, European classical and various forms of indie. Furthermore, African, South American, Asian, and Indigenous cultures greatly influence the music of Halifax.

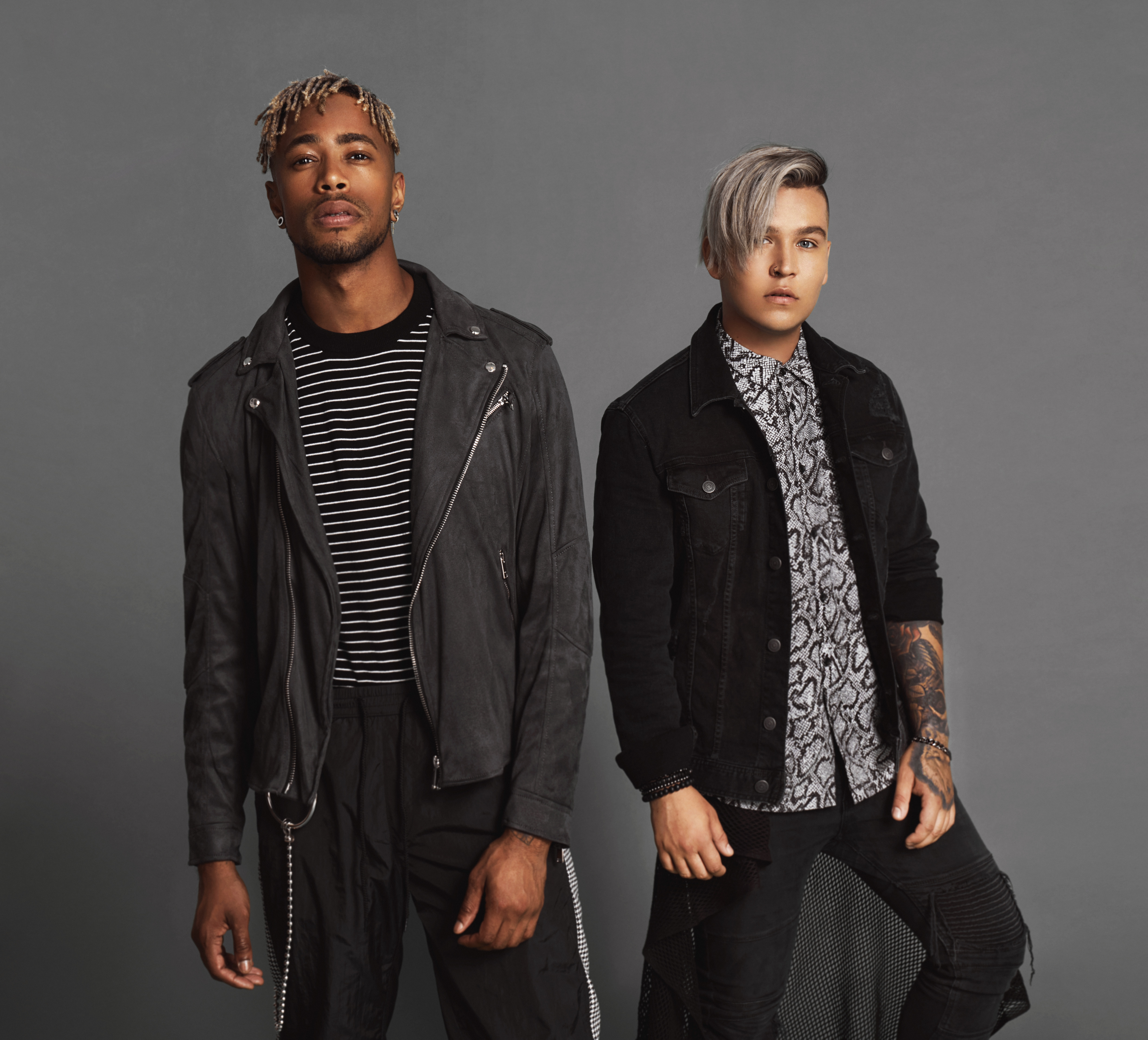
Neon Dreams.

Some notable artists to have emerged from Halifax include April Wine, Buck 65, Classified, Thrush Hermit, Sarah McLachlan, Neon Dreams, The Joel Plaskett Emergency, Sloan, Pat Stay, Universal Soul, and Wintersleep.

Halifax is the home of Symphony Nova Scotia, which dates back to 1897 when it was known as The Halifax Symphony Orchestra. As of 2026, Symphony Nova Scotia's conductors are Principal Baroque Leader, Julia Wedman; and Artist in Residence-and-Community Ambassador, Daniel Bartholomew-Poyser.

On 23 September 2006, the Rolling Stones held a large concert on the Halifax Commons which over 39,000 people attended. The municipality also hosted the 2006 and 2024 Juno Awards.

=== Performing ===
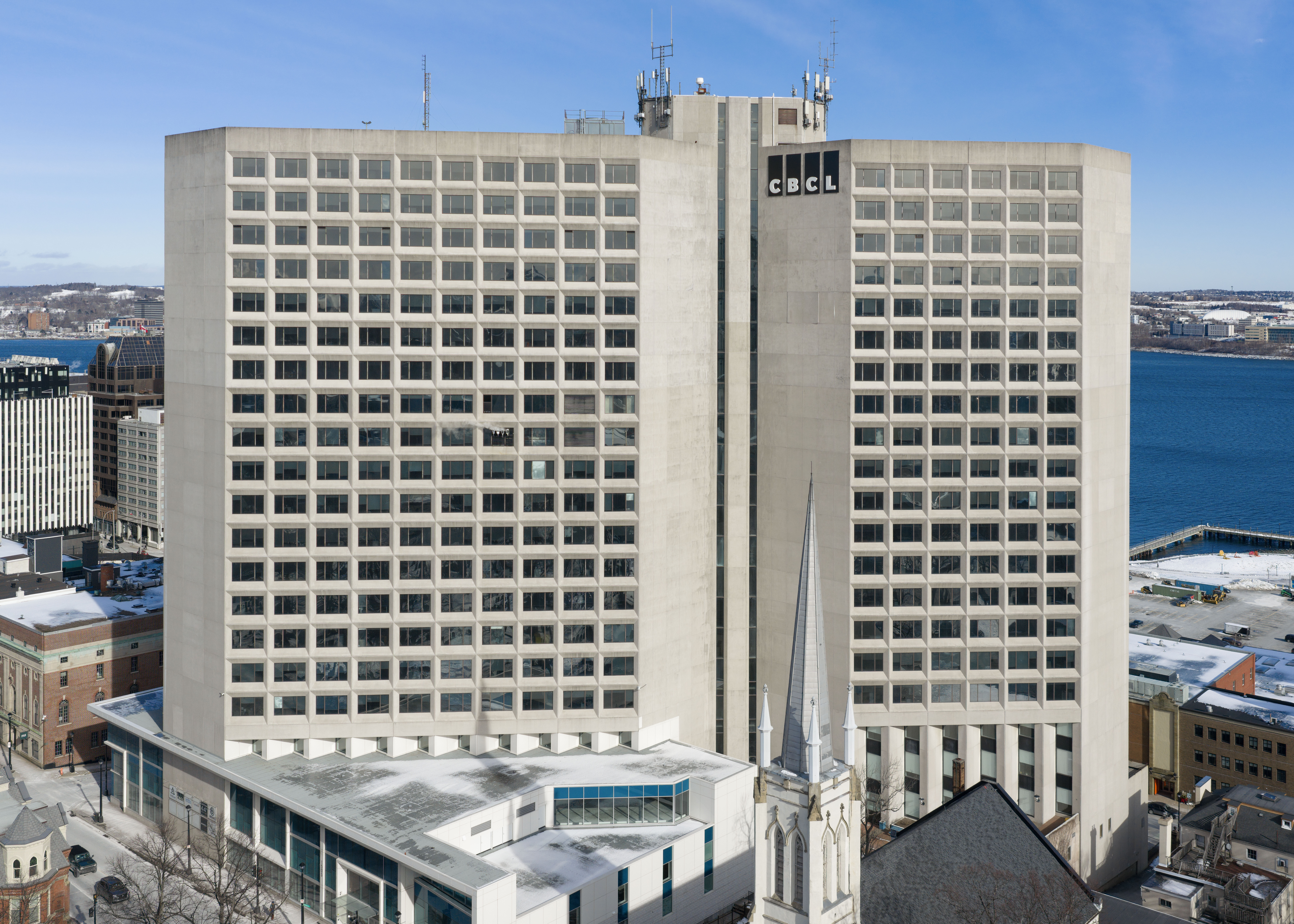
The Maritime Centre.

Halifax has been home to live music and theatrical productions virtually since its founding. Writer-historian Thomas H. Raddall wrote that by the 1780s there were no less than two theatres, the "old" Grand Theatre on Argyle Street and the "new" Grand Theatre on Grafton Street. From 1876 until its demolition in 1929, plays, concerts and even operas were performed at the Academy of Music building near the corner of Barrington Street at Spring Garden Road. Reflecting the change in popular taste, the Academy building was torn down to make way for the Capitol Theatre, a movie house. The old-style cinema was itself subject to obsolescence, and in the 1970s demolished to make way for an office building - now the Maritime Centre.

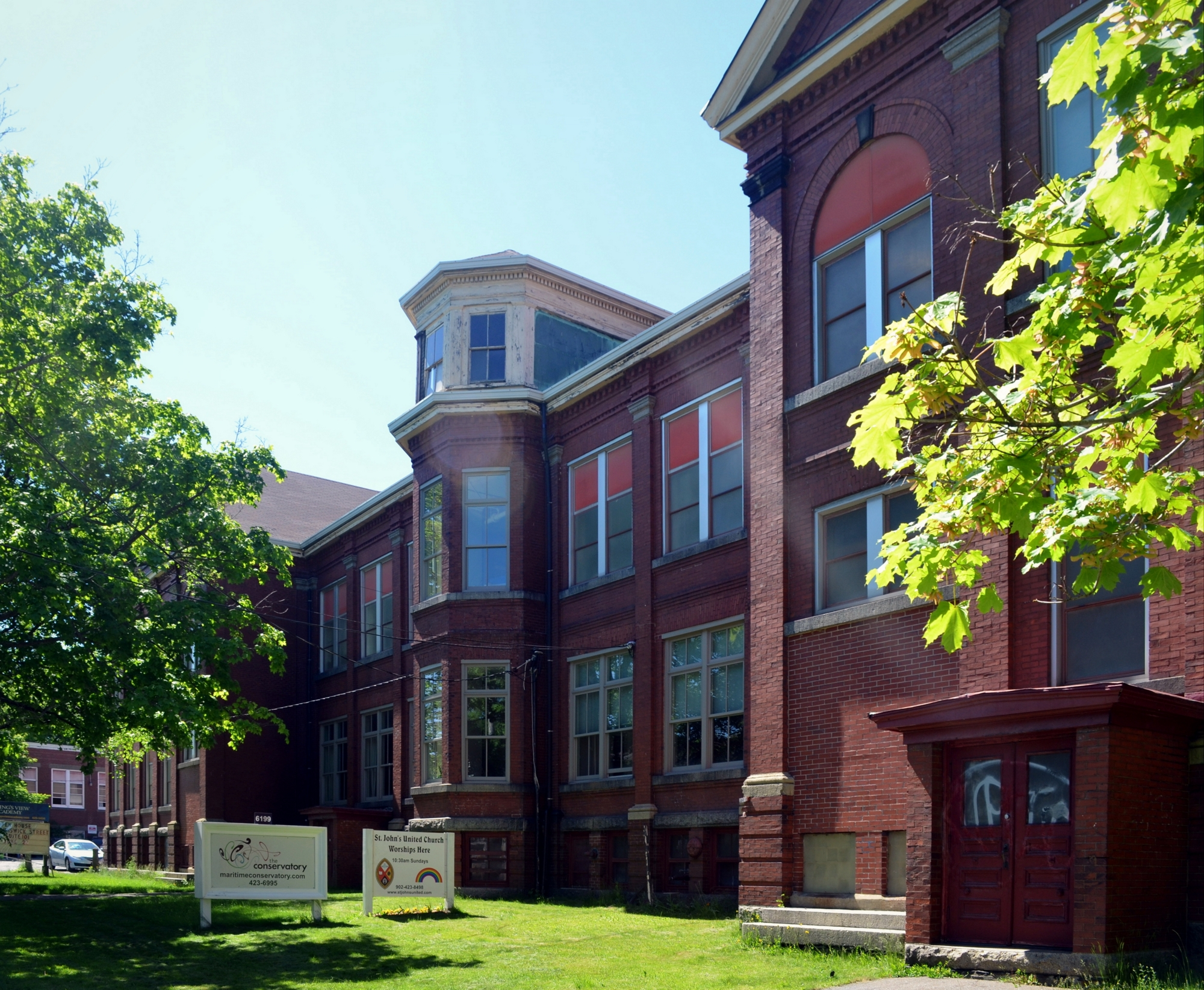
The Maritime Conservatory of Performing Arts.

Multiple dance associations exist within Halifax Regional Municipality. Since 1947, the Maritime Conservatory of Performing Arts (The Conservatory) has offered post-secondary dance, music, and theatre programs. It is located in the West End of Halifax. It offers general and professional programs to beginners or the experienced. Furthermore, the school offers a post-secondary Teacher Training Program Diploma.

Halifax Dance offers classes from the Maritime Centre in Downtown Halifax. Established in 1973 as the Halifax Dance Association, Halifax Dance offers recreational classes in ballet, creative movement, hip-hop, jazz, modern, physical theatre, and tap. At an advanced level, choreopgraphy; dance; and performance are offered within the Intensive Training Programme (ITP). Furthermore, Halifax Dance has several companies-in-residence: Senior Company-in Residence, Gwen Noah Dance, the modern companies Mocean Dance and Verve Mwendo and also the Young Company which tours Nova Scotian schools and annually presents The Nutcracker.

Halifax's immigrant communities also have an array of dance troupes that perform all over Halifax and Nova Scotia. One of these troupes is the Romiosyni Dance Group from the Greek community which headlines at the annual Greek Festival and performs throughout the Maritimes. The group is composed of volunteer instructors and dancers who share the love of Greek dance and culture. Their costume collection comes from the various regions of Greece and their repertoire includes a large number of traditional Greek dances.

=== Theater ===
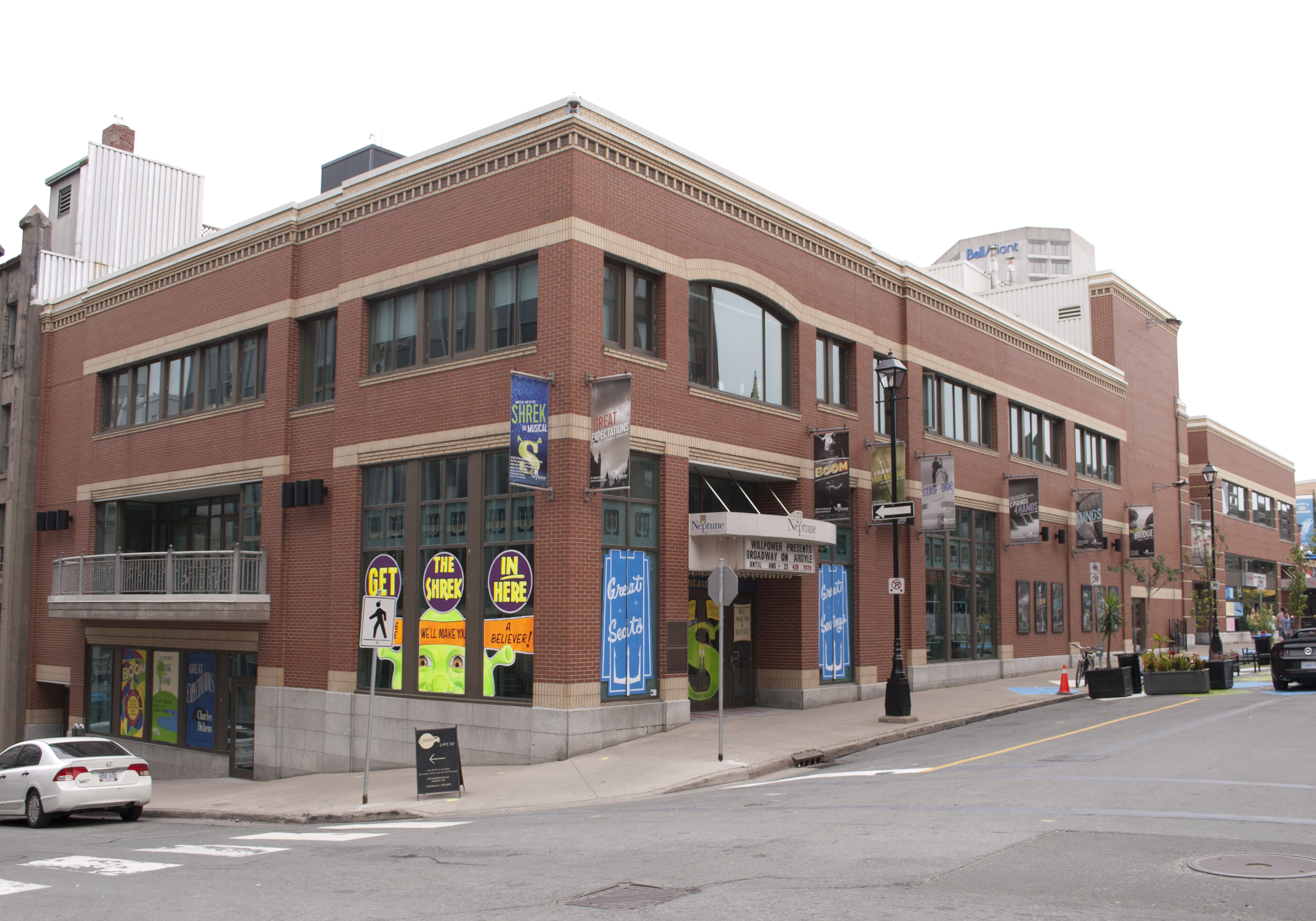
The Neptune Theatre.

Halifax is home to a number of theater groups, the most prominent being the Neptune Theatre. Though Neptune was founded in 1963, live theater had been performed on the present site since 1915, when it was reputed to be the first Vaudeville house designed and built specifically as a theater.

Since 1993, the Eastern Front Theatre hosts theater camps, stage theater, and promotes accessibility to theater. It is based in Alderney Landing, Dartmouth.

The open air Shakespeare by the Sea, operated by Canada's longest continuously running community theatre The Theatre Arts Guild, operates within the municipality and was started in 1994.

Smaller theater companies such as Zuppa Circus, 2b Theatre; Foghorn Theatre, OneLight Theatre, as well as various community-based theatre groups including the Chester Players and the Dartmouth Players.

== Food ==
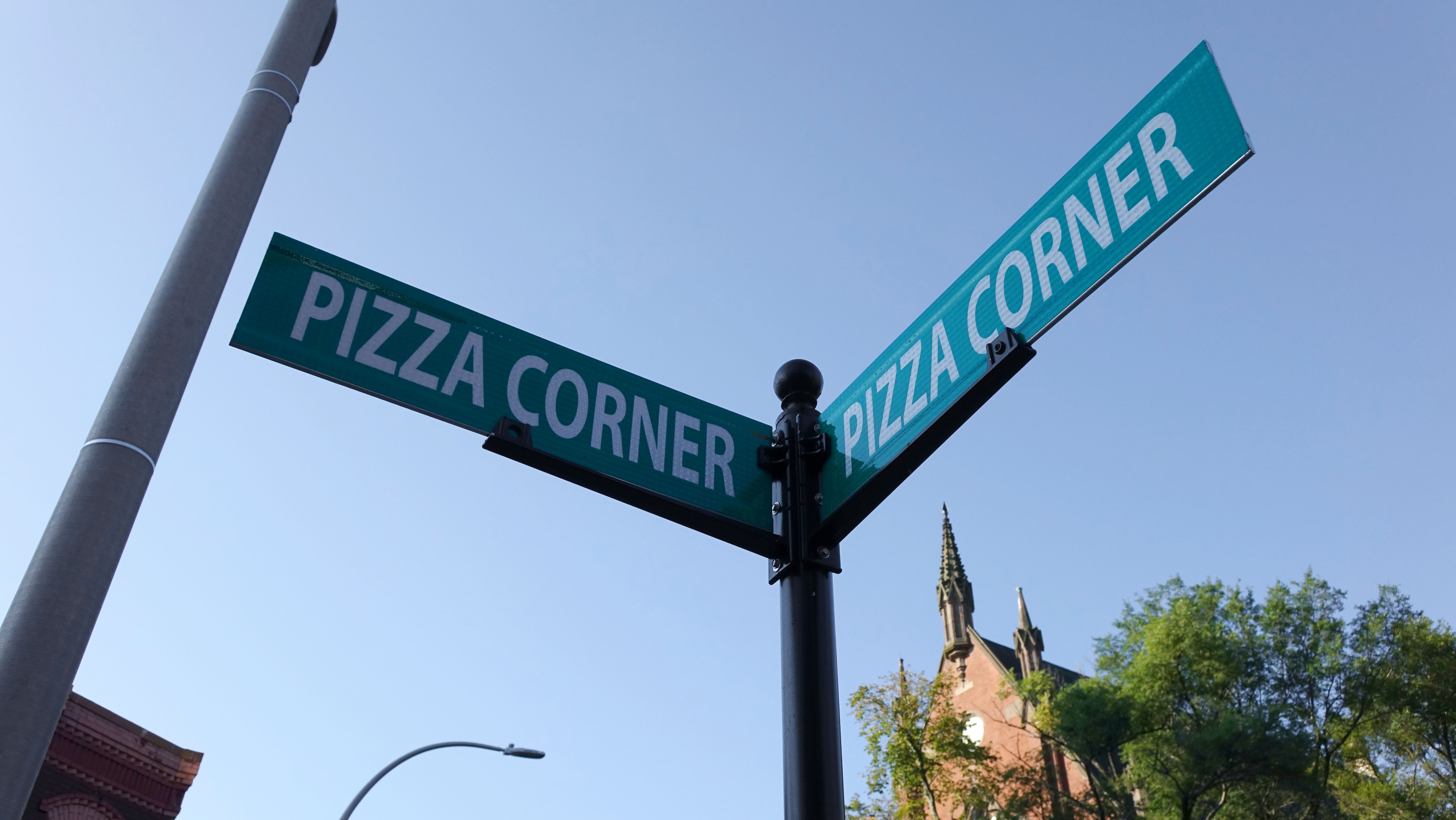
Pizza Corner signage.

Pizza Corner, an unofficial nickname for the corner of Blowers Street and Grafton Street in Halifax' urban core, is a popular place for many late night-and-early morning hungry people on Thursdays, Fridays, and Saturdays.

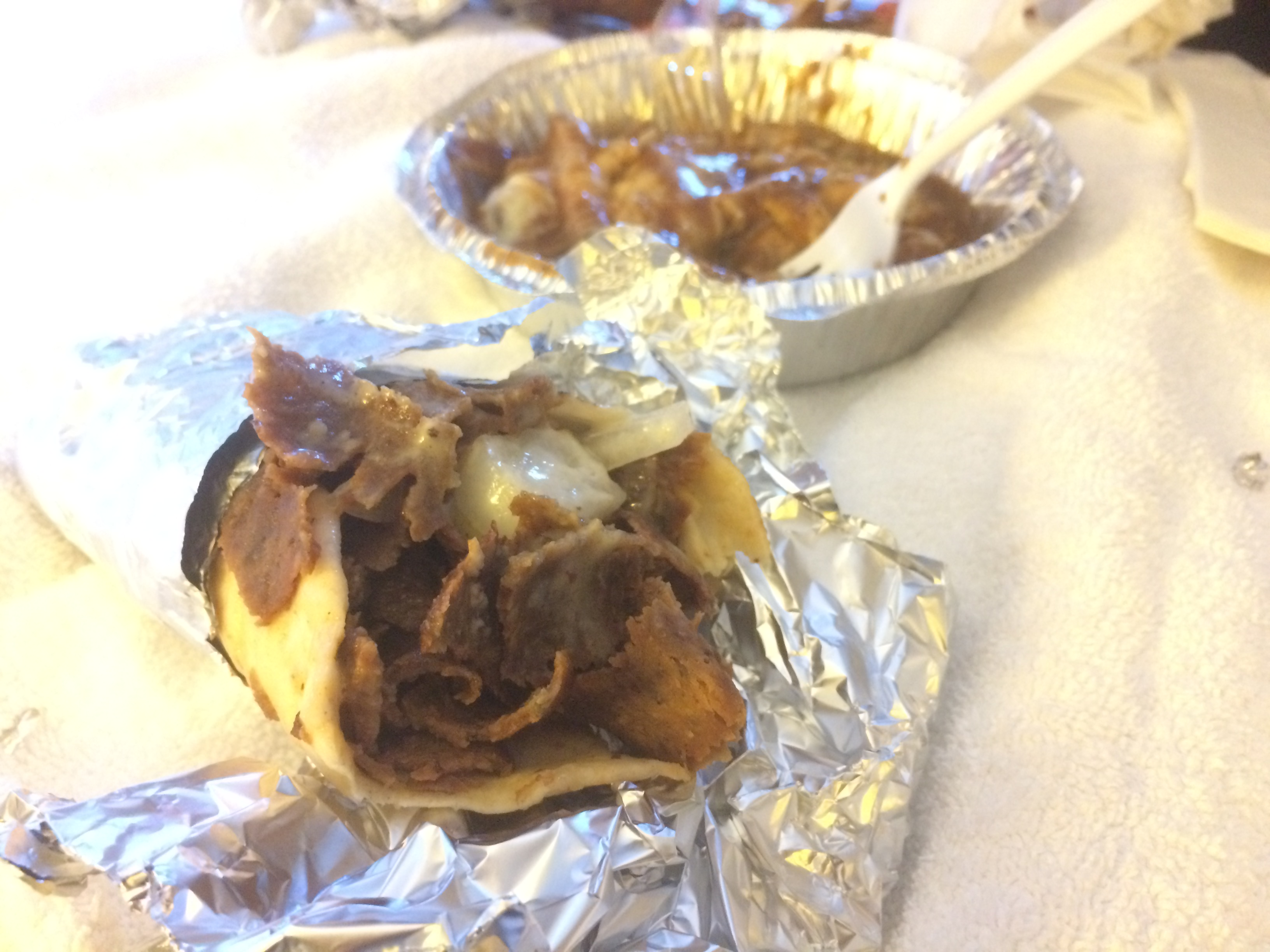
A Halifax Donair.

In December 2015, the Halifax Donair became the regional municipality's official food, introduced in the 1970s.

As continuous immigration has greatly introduced new cuisines to the regional municipality, Halifax has increasingly diversified its availability of foods. African, American, Asian, European, and Indigenous cultures have widely varied the local eating scene.

As Halifax is close to the various fishing grounds of the Atlantic coast of North America, fresh seafood is commonplace. Fresh clams, haddock, lobster, salmon, and scallops are widely available along with many other varieties of fin-fish and shellfish.

== Tourism ==
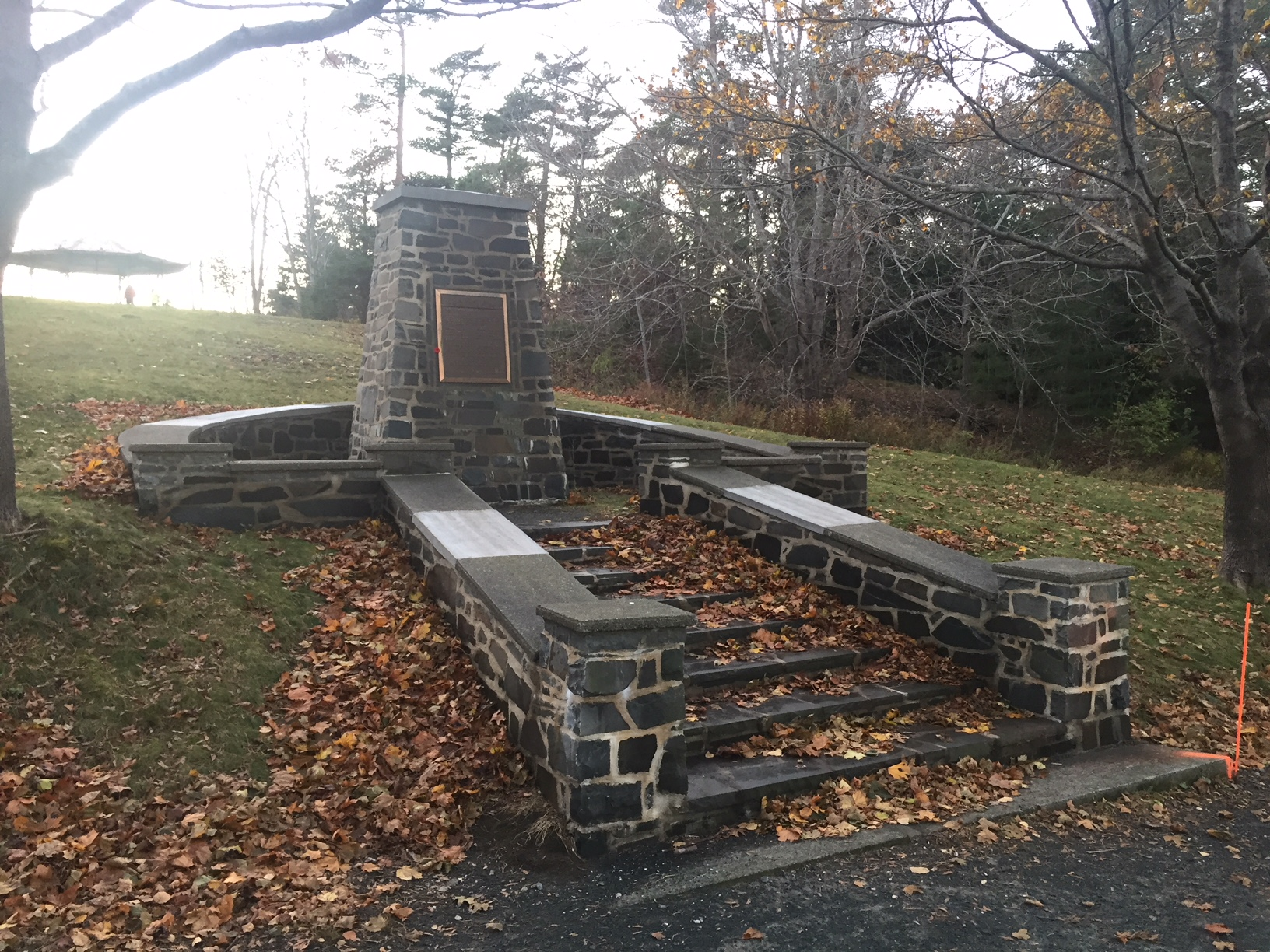
SS Point Pleasant Park Monument, Point Pleasant Park, Halifax, Nova Scotia, Canada

With numerous festivals, museums, parks, pubs, restaurants, and stores within the region, especially in the urban cores, Halifax Regional Municipality is a popular tourist destination.

The economic benefit of tourism to the municipality is important, as it both directly and indirectly supports over 34,000 jobs. In its 2025 Season, Halifax was the destination for 24 cruise lines, with 184 calls to port, and over 350,000 cruise ship passengers and over 150,000 crew members. Within the season there were reported 93 days where hotels essentially had no-vacancy, over two million booked rooms, and over $1 billion spent by visitors.

=== Museums ===
The Nova Scotia Museum network hosts two museums in the municipality: The Maritime Museum of the Atlantic and the Nova Scotia Museum of Natural History. Both of these are within Halifax's urban core. The Halifax Citadel within the urban core is a 22.6 ha (56 acres) fort and National Historic Site.

The Discovery Centre offers interactive educational subjects. Its current location off of Lower Water Street has over 3,700 square metres (40,000 sq ft) of floor space, which is double that of the former location.

On 3 November 1964, the Nova Scotia Sport Hall of Fame was established. The free museum showcases achievements of sport within the Nova Scotian community and has been in its current location at the World Trade and Convention Centre off of Argyle Street since December 1988.

Within the North End, the Africville Museum shares the history of the Africville community.

With over 3,700 square metres (40,000 sq ft) of exhibit space, the Steele Wheels Motor Museum in Bayers Lake contains classic, super, and exotic vehicles.

The Dartmouth Heritage Museum was established in 1967. Since 2002, its locations include Evergreen House off of Newcastle Street and the Quaker House off of Ochterloney Street. Both museums have exhibited Dartmouth cultural, historical, and storytelling of Greater Dartmouth.

The Black Cultural Centre for Nova Scotia is a library resource and museum dedicated to African Nova Scotian culture. Located in Cherry Brook, it has been in operation since 1983 and exhibits to protect, preserve, and promote black culture.

In 1973, the Cole Harbour Rural Heritage Farm was established. This museum focuses on the preservation and interpretation of Cole Harbour's agricultural past.

With a goal to acquire, conserve, organize, research, and interpret things with relation to Canadian Maritime Military Aviation, the Shearwater Aviation Museum displays Canadian Armed Forces artifacts and documents. Opened in 1978, the museum is located in Shearwater.

A museum which is dedicated to the Shubenacadie Canal System education, the Fairbanks Centre is located at the entrance of Shubie Park. This centre is open all-year and is the Shubenacadie Canal System's interpretive liaison.

The Urban Farm Museum, which is partnered with the Urban Farm Museum Society of Spryfield, is an urban farm spanning over 1.41 hectares (3.5 acres). In 2016, the farm received a gift of over 0.86 hectares (2.1 acres) of old growth forested land from Ralph Medjuck. Gardens commenced in 2002, and the museum promotes skills to provide healthy and safe food for now and in the future.

Built in approximately 1770, The Scott Manor House and its namesake Museum is a home which has a cellar, first floor, second floor, and an attic. Located in Central Bedford, the museum depicts life in the area during the time period.

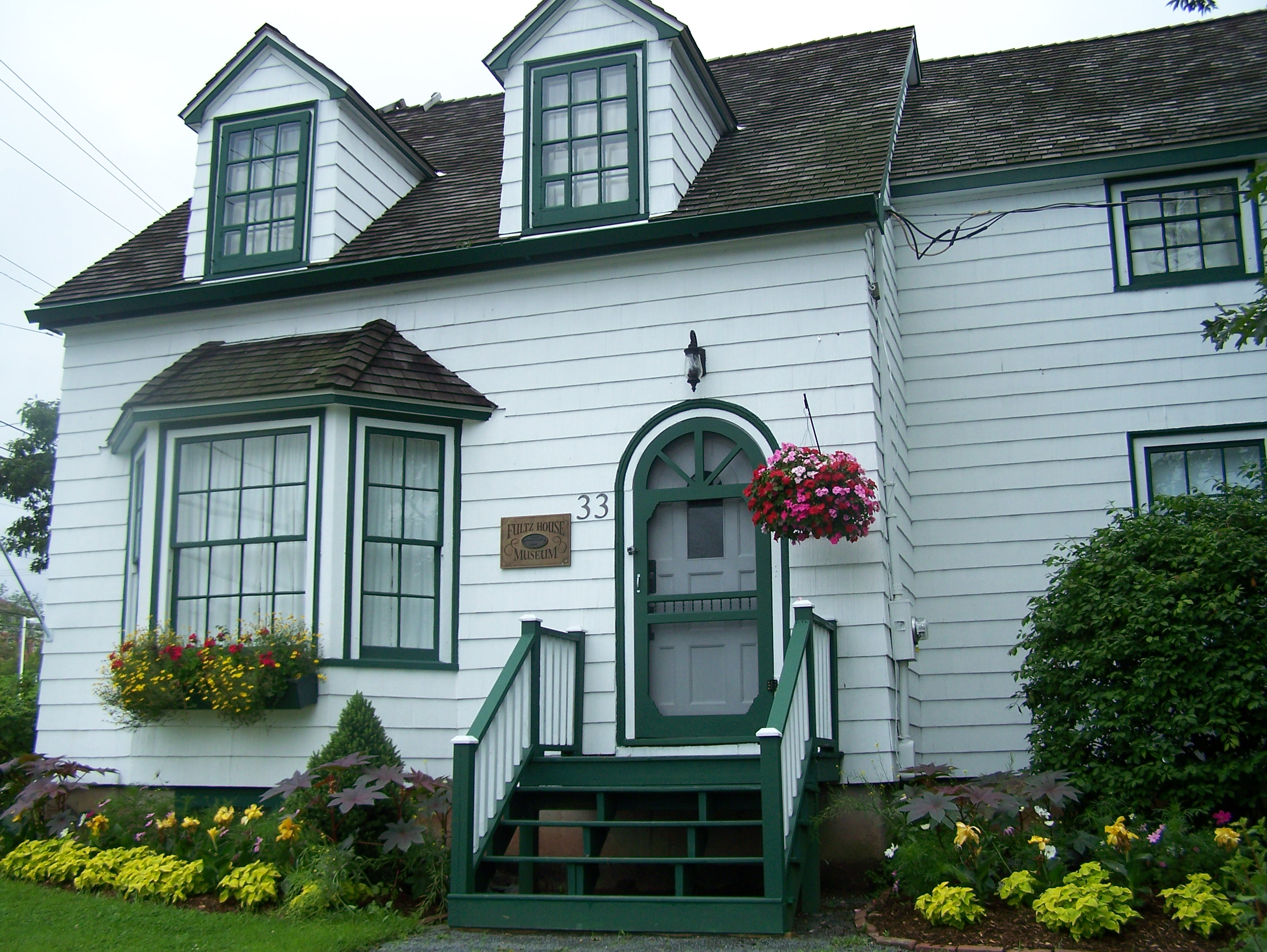
The Fultz House Museum.

The Fultz House in Lower Sackville was finished in 1865 and opened as a museum on 1 July 1982. With a display of artifacts from Beaver Bank, Kinsac, Lucasville, and Lower; Middle; and Upper Sackville history, some pieces date from the 1800s.

In Waverley, the Waverley Heritage Museum gives visitors education on local milling, mining, railway, and smithing industry in the area. It also houses a collection of area census records, directories, and maps.

== Festivals and events ==
The Tall Ships challenge took place in Halifax Harbour in 1984, 2000, 2004 and 2007. Yacht races such as the biennial Marblehead to Halifax Ocean Race between Canada and the United States of America, and the Route Halifax Saint-Pierre Ocean Race between Canada and France also take place in the harbour.

Since its inception in 1979, the Royal Nova Scotia International Tattoo features international acts with two, 150-minute shows per day: one 14:00 show, and one 19:00 show. In 2006, Her Royal Highness Queen Elizabeth II of the United Kingdom granted the Royal Nova Scotia International Tattoo with its Royal designation.

The Atlantic International Film Festival was formed in 1981 in Saint John's, and held in Halifax since 1982. The eight-day festival showcases over one-hundred local, national, and international films.

The Halifax Busker Festival, the Buskers, began in 1986 and has showcased much international talent. The festival is held over a six-day period during the Natal Day long weekend in August.

Since 1987, the TD Halifax Jazz Festival involves 400 volunteers, employs over 350 local musicians, and attracts 65,000 visitors to its year-round educational and musical activities. Since 1996, the festival offers an eight-day intensive Creative Music Workshop program which is open to anyone of 15 years old or older.

Halifax Pride began in 1988 with approximately 75 people within the march. Today, the gathering consists of over 150 community led events with over 50,000 participants annually in support of the 2SLGBTQ+ community.

Nova Multifest is an annual multicultural festival which celebrates cuisine, crafts, music, and more at Alderney Landing in the urban core of Dartmouth.

== Entertainment and nightlife ==
=== Venues ===
The largest indoor venue in Halifax Regional Municipality is the Scotiabank Centre in Halifax's urban core. At over 1,500 square metres (16,000 sq ft), it has a seating capacity of over 10,500 people. The multipurpose facility has been host to numerous concerts, hockey games, and events since its opening in 1978.

Outdoor concerts are often performed on the slopes of Citadel Hill or on the Halifax Common. Other venues include:

- Citadel High School
  - Spatz Theatre is a 780-seat auditorium.
- Halifax West High School
  - Bella Rose Arts Centre a 600-seat auditorium.
- Dalhousie University
  - Rebecca Cohn Auditorium is a 1023-seat auditorium.
  - Ondaatje Hall is a 535-seat lecture hall.
  - Sir James Dunn Theatre is a 198-seat theatre.
- Mount Saint Vincent University
  - Seton Auditorium is a 1000-seat auditorium with a unique round configuration.
- Saint Mary's University
  - McNally Theatre is a 600-seat auditorium.
- Casino Nova Scotia has several venues for concerts and events.
- Alderney Landing Community Cultural Centre is a convention centre, art gallery, market, and theatre facility in Downtown Dartmouth, Nova Scotia with capability to host events with up to 8000 persons.
- The Halifax Pavilion is an all-ages club and operates as a venue to foster new performers and offers a stage for burgeoning bands to try out their tunes. It also hosts up-and-coming out of town bands and creates a community among indie and punk musicians.
- Paul O'Regan Hall is a 300-seat auditorium at the Halifax Central Library.
- The Khyber is an arts and performance center on Barrington Street.
- The Music Room is a 110-seat venue noted for its excellent acoustics.
- The Paragon (formerly the Marquee Club) hosts the bigger indie acts in Halifax in an old commercial building in Halifax's North End. Its stage has hosted a wide number of local and Canadian music staples.
- Neptune Theatre
  - The Fountain Hall has 479 seats.
  - The Studio Theatre has capability for 200 seats.

Halifax has many cannabis and liquor vendors. With over 655 licensed liquor establishments and 25 licensed cannabis dispensaries, Halifax has 148 liquor establishments and 5 cannabis dispensaries per 100,000 residents.

The Split Crow Pub is a tavern founded in 1890 and named after the oldest pub in the town, which was the first place in Nova Scotia to get a liquor license.

Halifax's relatively late last call (between 03:00 and 04:00) means that many party-goers are out into the early hours of the morning. Many bars have live music every night of the week and artists performing almost any style of music can be found.

== See also ==
- Media in Halifax, Nova Scotia
