= Emera Oval =

Skating rink in Halifax, Nova Scotia

Coordinates: 44°38′57.99″N 63°35′16.29″W

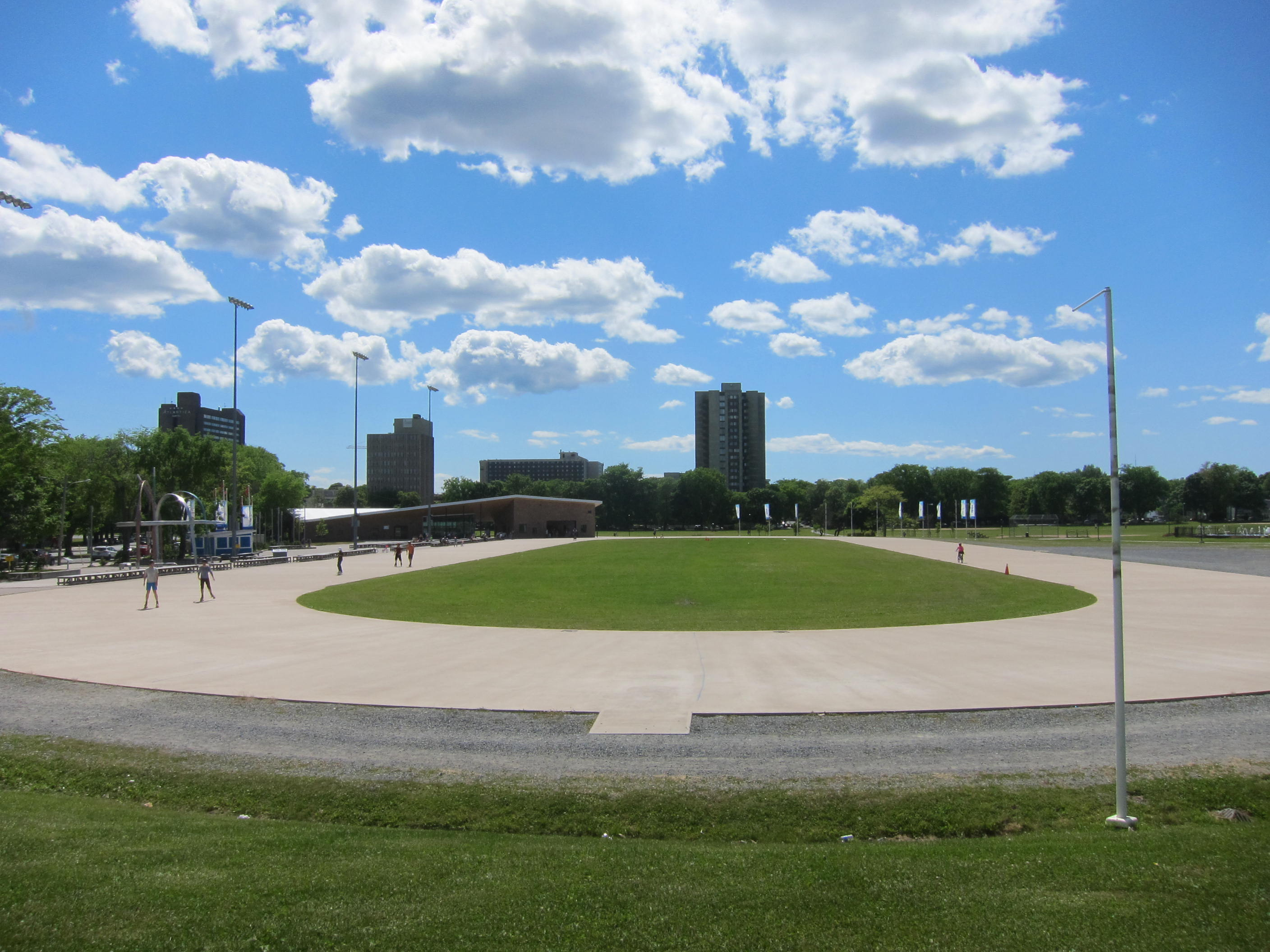
The oval being used for roller-skating in the summertime

The Emera Oval, originally known as the Canada Games Oval, is a permanent skating rink/speed skating rink installed in Halifax, Nova Scotia, on the Halifax Commons for the 2011 Canada Games. It is the size of three NHL hockey rinks.

== History and future ==
In December 2010, the oval was opened to the public for public skates and skating lessons. The oval was used from February 12 to 16, 2011, for long track speed skating competitions. The oval hosted speed skating events in the Canadian Masters Championships, January 15–16, 2011 and the 2011 Canada Games, February 11–27, 2011. After initial delays opening, caused by unseasonably warm temperatures in Halifax, the oval opened to tremendous response from the community. Hundreds of people have come out each day, for free skating, with some estimates placing attendance as high as 2,000 people in a single day. The oval was slated to be removed in March 2011, but due to the overwhelming response, the fixture was made permanent.
