= Speed skating rink =

Ice rink designed for speed skating

A speed skating rink (or speed skating oval) is an ice rink in which a speed skating competition is held.

== The rink ==
A standard long track speed skating track is, according to the regulations of the International Skating Union (ISU), a double-laned track with two curved ends each of 180°, in which the radius of the inner curve is not less than 25 metres and not more than 26 metres. The width of the competition lanes is 4 metres. At the opposite straight of the finishing line, there is a crossing area, where the skaters must change lane.

At international competitions, the track must be 400 metres long, with a warm-up lane at least 4 metres wide inside the competition lanes. For Olympic competitions, the track must also be enclosed within a building.

The design and dimensions of a speed skating track have remained more or less unchanged since the foundation of ISU in 1892.

The speed skating track is also used for the sports of Icetrack cycling and Ice speedway

=== Measurement and demarcation ===
The dimensions of a standard speed skating rink

The measurement of the track is made half a meter into the lane. The total length of the track is the distance a competitor skates each lap, i.e. the length of two straights, one inner curve and one outer curve, in addition to the extra distance skated when changing lanes in the cross-over area, which on a standard track equals 7 centimeters.

- A 400 m track with inner radius 25.0 m has 113.57 m long straights
- A 400 m track with inner radius 25.5 m has 112.00 m long straights
- A 400 m track with inner radius 26.0 m has 110.43 m long straights

The demarcation of the competition lanes are made by painted lines in the ice (or a set of painted marks) and movable blocks of rubber. On outdoor tracks, snow may also be used for demarcation of the competition lanes.

=== Alternative speed skating tracks ===
Although ISU regulations state that minimum measures for a standard speed skating track, alternative track lengths may be used for competition. The minimum requirements are track length on 200 meters, radius of inner curve of 15 meters and width of the competition lanes 2 meters.

Short track speed skating tracks have a length of 111.111 metres (364.54 ft). The rink is 60 metres (200 ft) long by 30 metres (98 ft) wide, which is the same size as an international-sized ice hockey rink.

== Combination with other sports ==
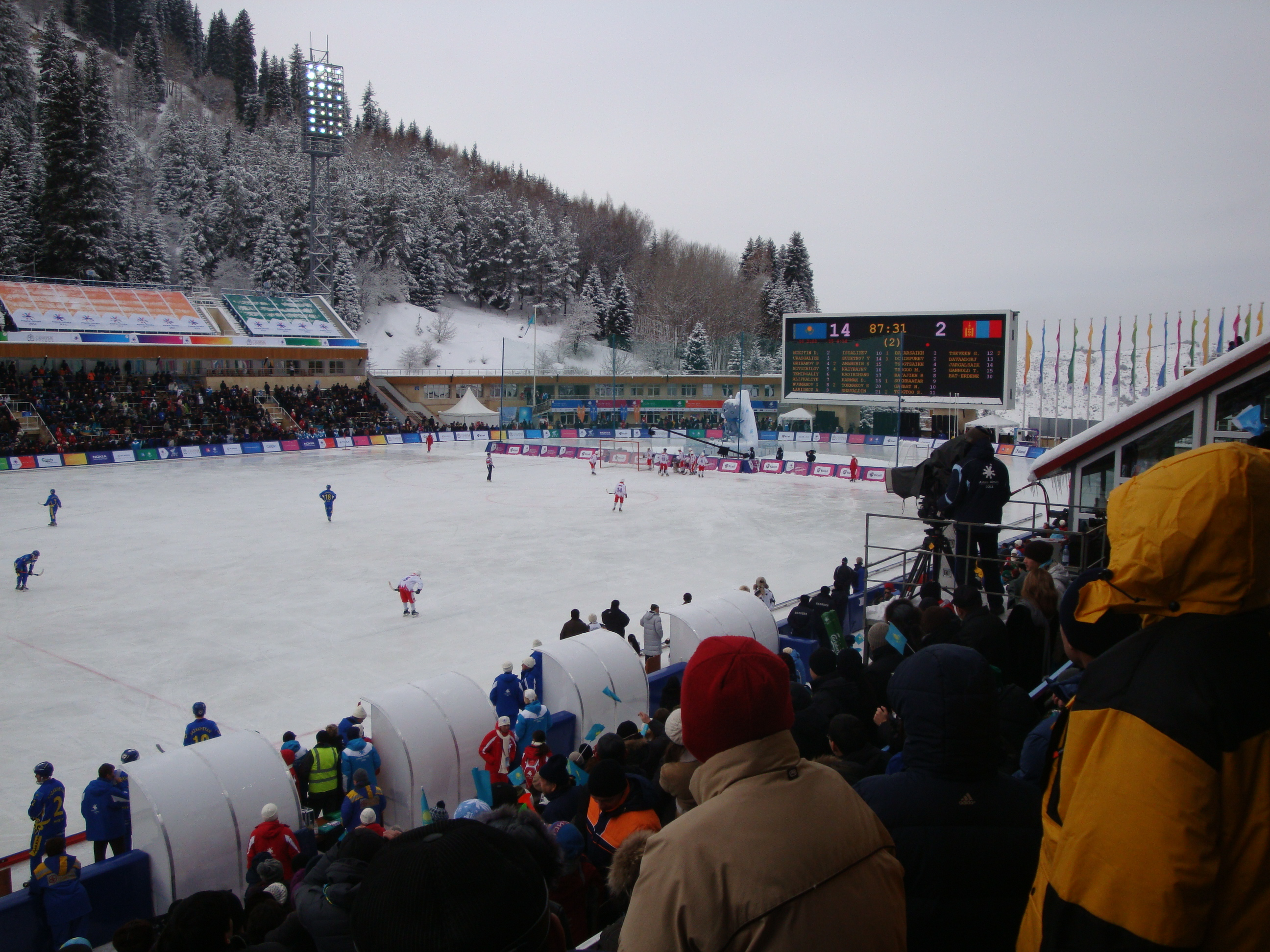
Medeu is also suitable for bandy

Many speed skating venues have ice hockey rinks or no ice area at all inside the oval. A few are suitable also for bandy, like Hamar Olympic Hall, Ice Palace Krylatskoye, and Medeu. The Beijing National Speed Skating Oval in Beijing, China, which was built for the 2022 Winter Olympics, is also designed appropriately for that sport. There is a growing cooperation between International Skating Union and Federation of International Bandy, since both have an interest in more indoor venues with large ice surfaces being built. In Norway there is an agreement in place, stating that an indoor arena intended primarily for either bandy or long track speed skating, shall have ice surface for the other sport as well.

== Outdoor speed skating tracks ==
In the table below, major outdoor speed skating tracks still in use are listed. This is not a complete list of speed skating venues, but lists most of the outdoor tracks used for international competitions. The data in the table are retrieved from the Speed Skating News database.

Country	City	Track name	Altitude (meters)	Opened	Type
Austria	Innsbruck	Olympiahalle	586	1963	Artificial ice
Canada	Halifax	Emera Oval	30	2011	Artificial ice
Canada	Saskatoon	Clarence Downey Oval	485	1947	Natural ice
Canada	Winnipeg	Susan Auch Oval	234	1979	Natural ice
Finland	Helsinki	Oulunkylä Ice Rink	39	1977	Artificial ice
Finland	Seinäjoki	Jääurheilukeskus	44	1952	Artificial ice
Hungary	Budapest	City Park Ice Rink	115	1968	Artificial ice
Italy	Baselga di Piné	Ice Rink Piné	998	1985	Artificial ice
Italy	Collalbo	Arena Ritten	1173	1989	Artificial ice
Japan	Shibukawa	Machiyama Highland Skating Center	936	1967	Artificial ice
Japan	Tomakomai	Tomakomai Highland Sport Center	25	1967	Artificial ice
Kazakhstan	Almaty	Medeu	1691	1951	Artificial ice
Netherlands	Amsterdam	Jaap Edenbaan	-5	1961	Artificial ice
Netherlands	Deventer	De Scheg	6	1992	Semi-covered
Netherlands	The Hague	De Uithof	0	1989	Semi-covered
Netherlands	Haarlem	IJsbaan Haarlem	0	1977	Semi-covered
Netherlands	Utrecht	Vechtsebanen	-2	1970	Semi-covered
Norway	Arendal	Myra kunstisbane	71	2004	Artificial ice
Norway	Oslo	Valle Hovin Stadion	92	1966	Artificial ice
Norway	Oslo	Valle Hovin Stadion	92	1966	Artificial ice
Poland	Sanok	Tor Błonie	284	1980	Artificial ice
Poland	Warsaw	Tor Stegny	82	1979	Artificial ice
United States	Anchorage	Cuddy Family Midtown Park Skating Oval	33	2008	Natural ice
United States	Lake Placid	James B. Sheffield Olympic Skating Rink	568	1977	Artificial ice
United States	Roseville	John Rose Minnesota Oval	276	1993	Artificial Ice

== Gallery ==
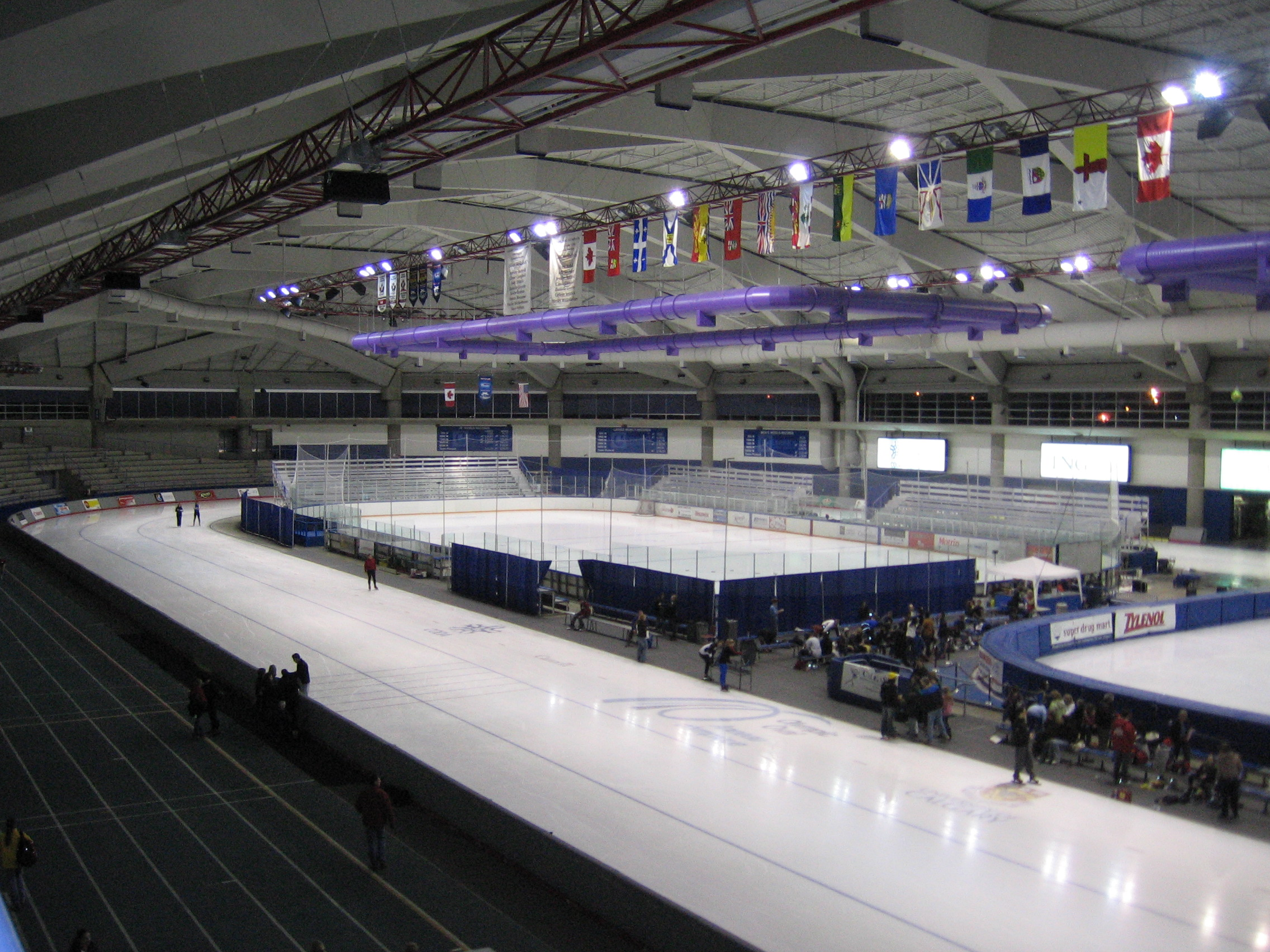
Olympic Oval (Calgary)

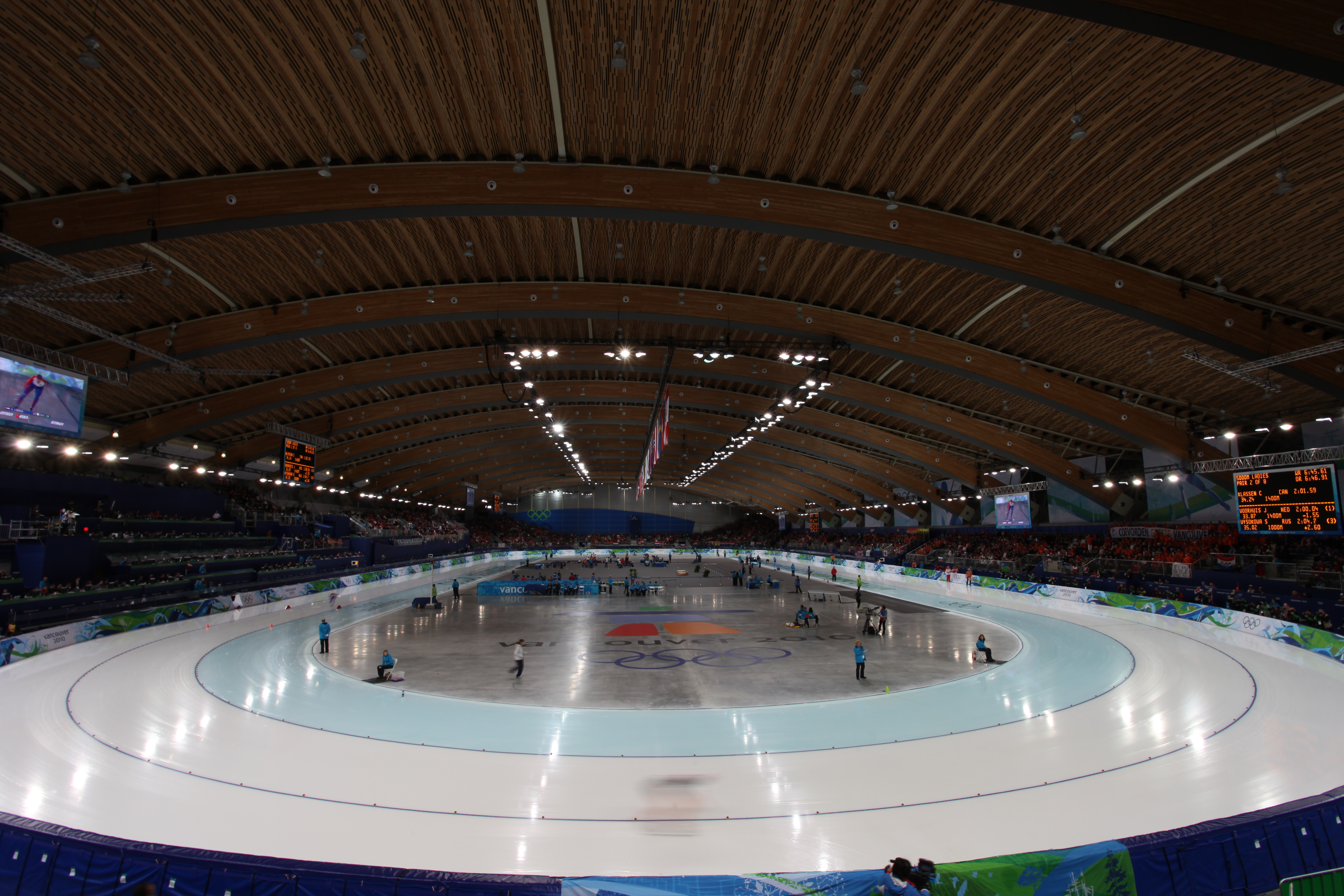
Richmond Olympic Oval (Vancouver)

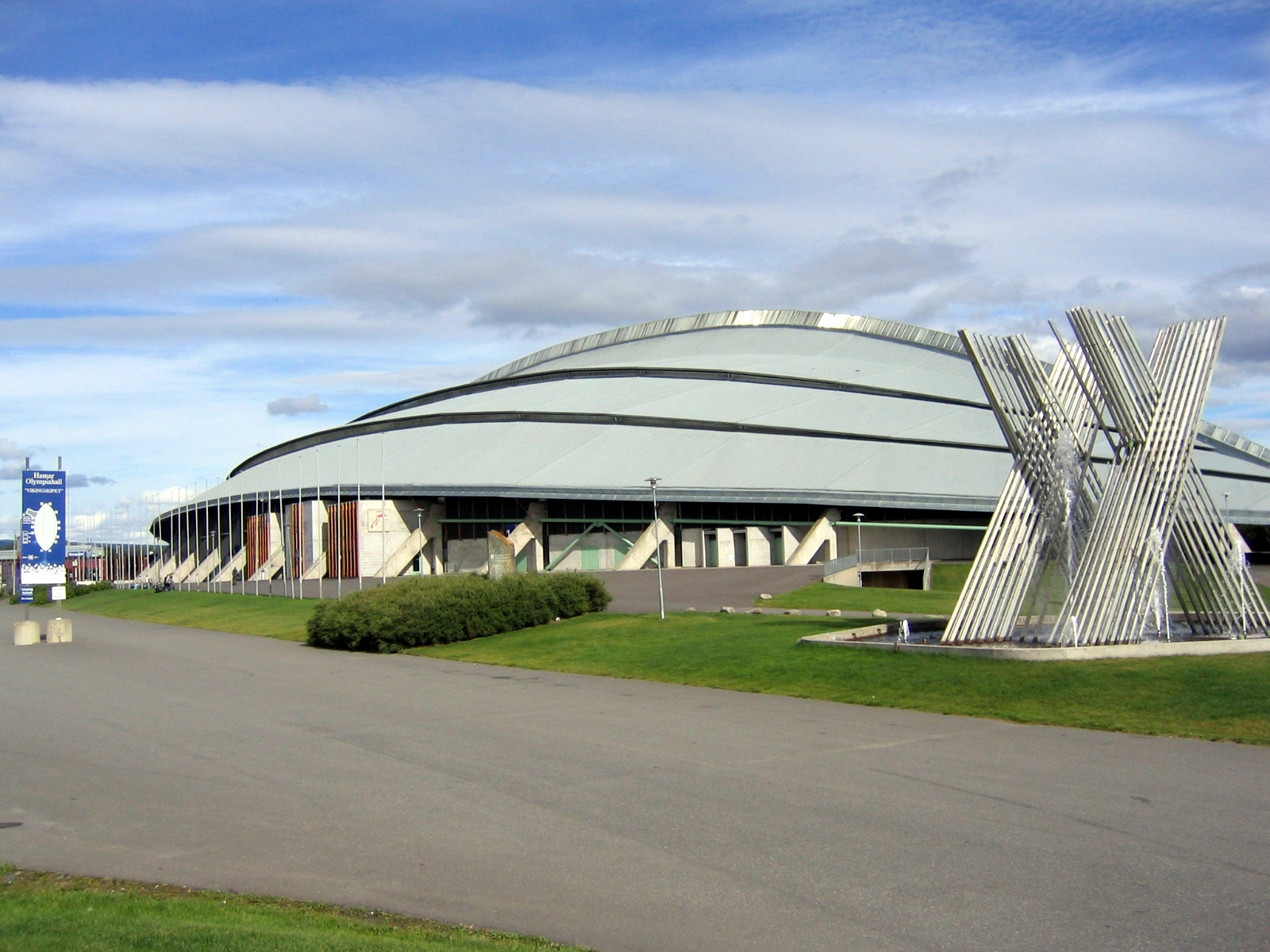
Vikingskipet Olympic Arena (Hamar)

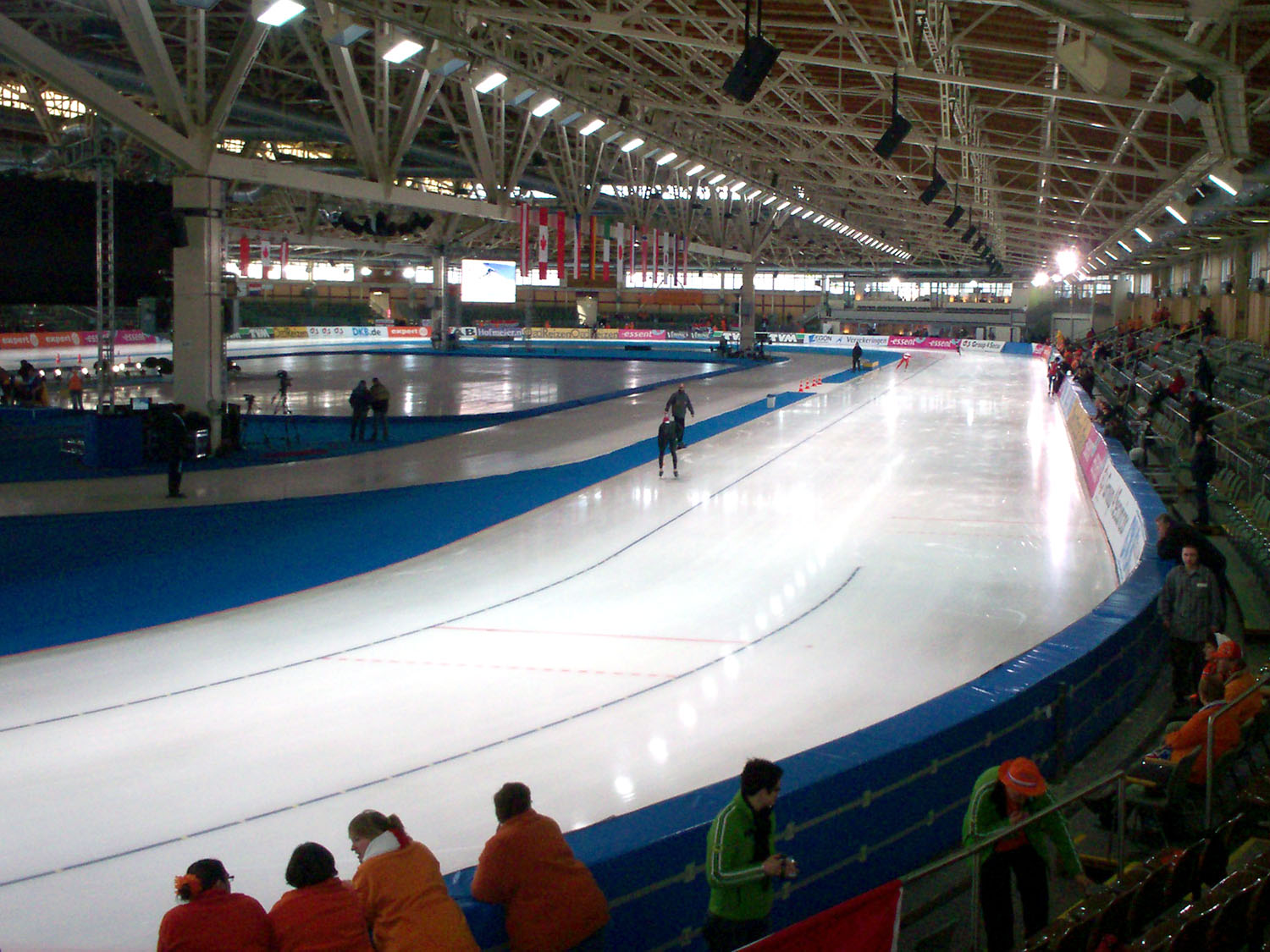
Sportforum Hohenschönhausen (Berlin)

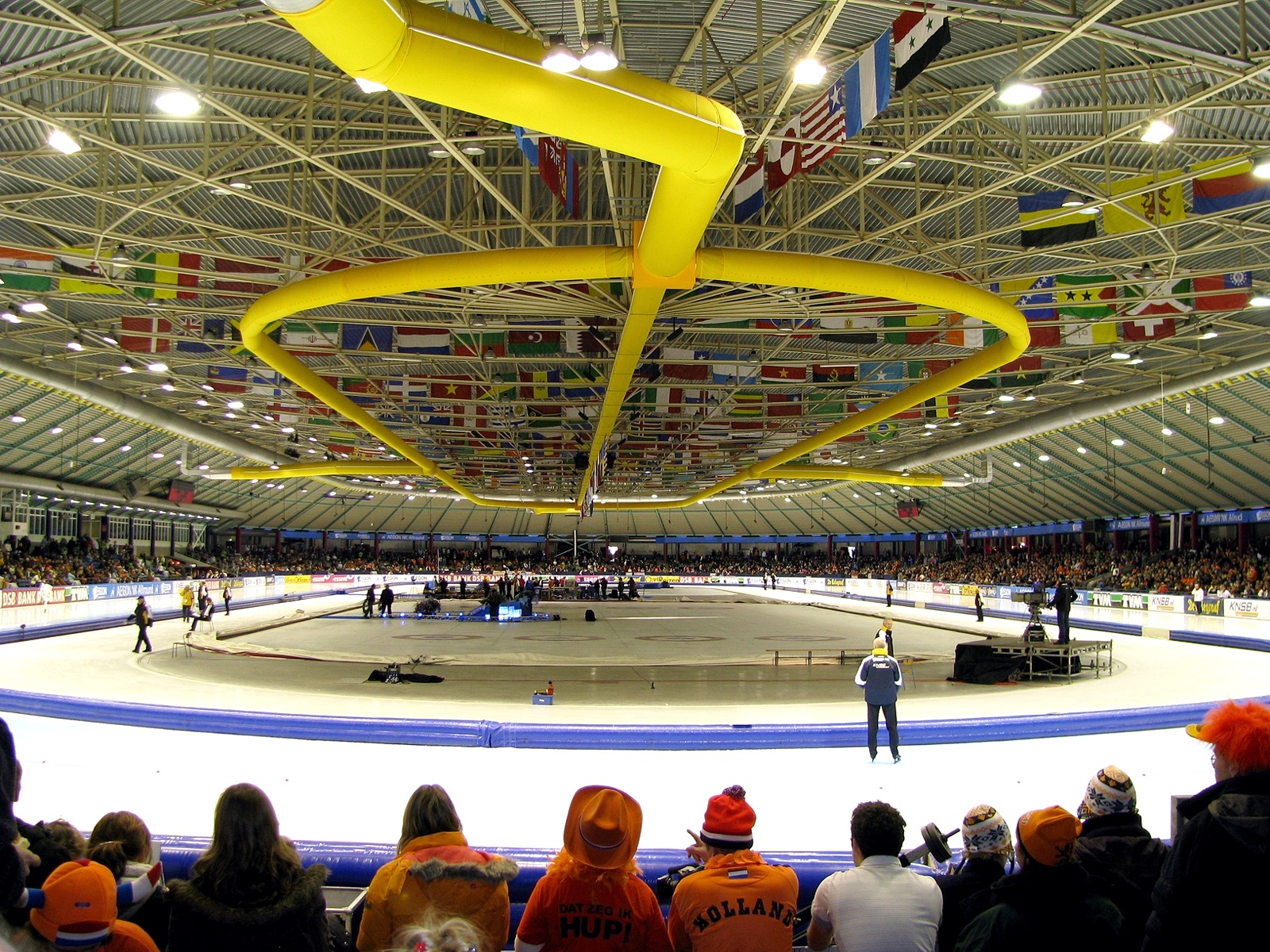
Thialf (Heerenveen)

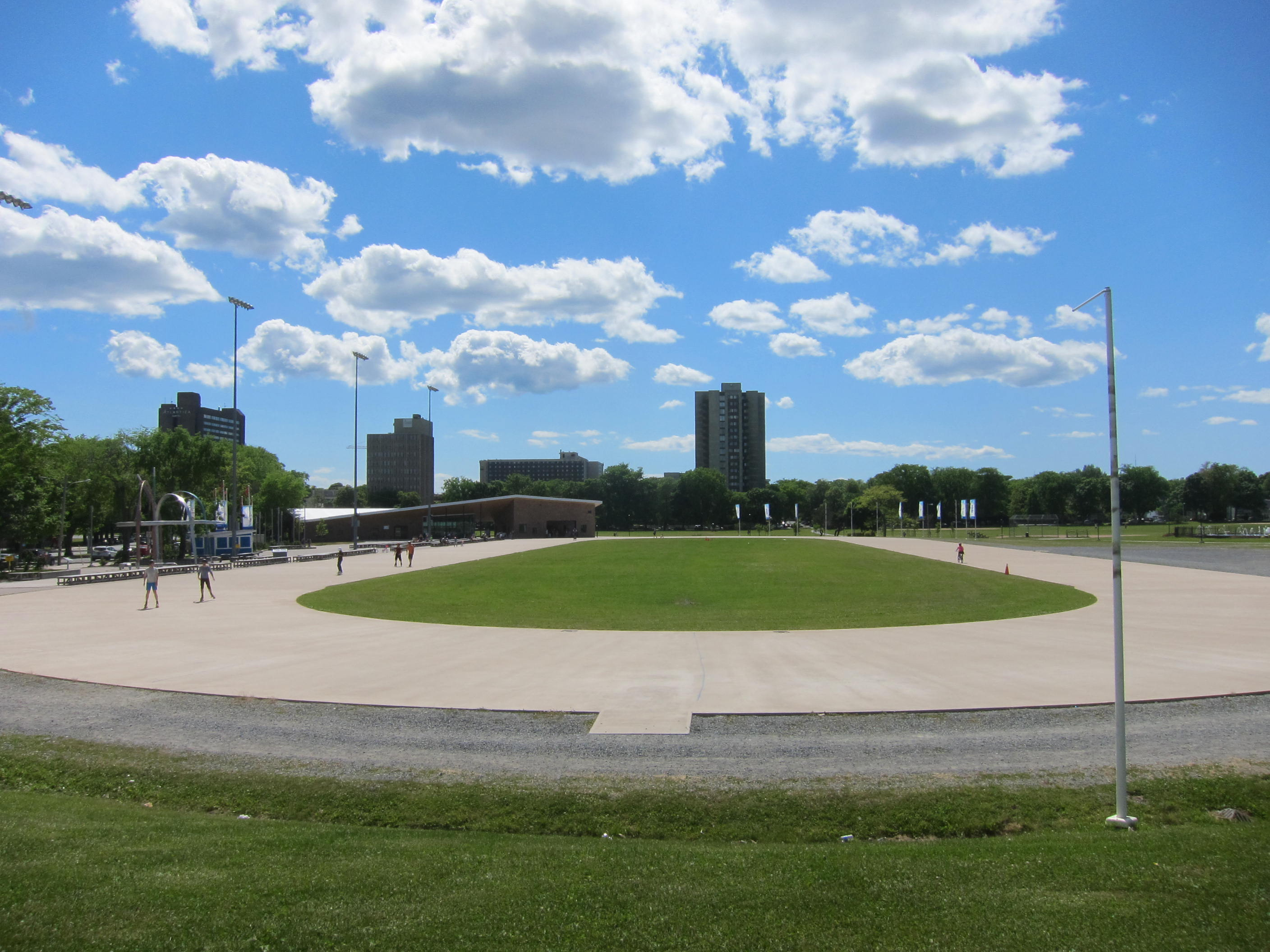
The Emera Oval in Halifax, Nova Scotia is opened for roller skating in the summertime

== See also ==
- Long track speed skating
- Figure skating rink
- Ice hockey rink
- Ice rink
