= Figure skating rink =

Ice rink designed for figure skating

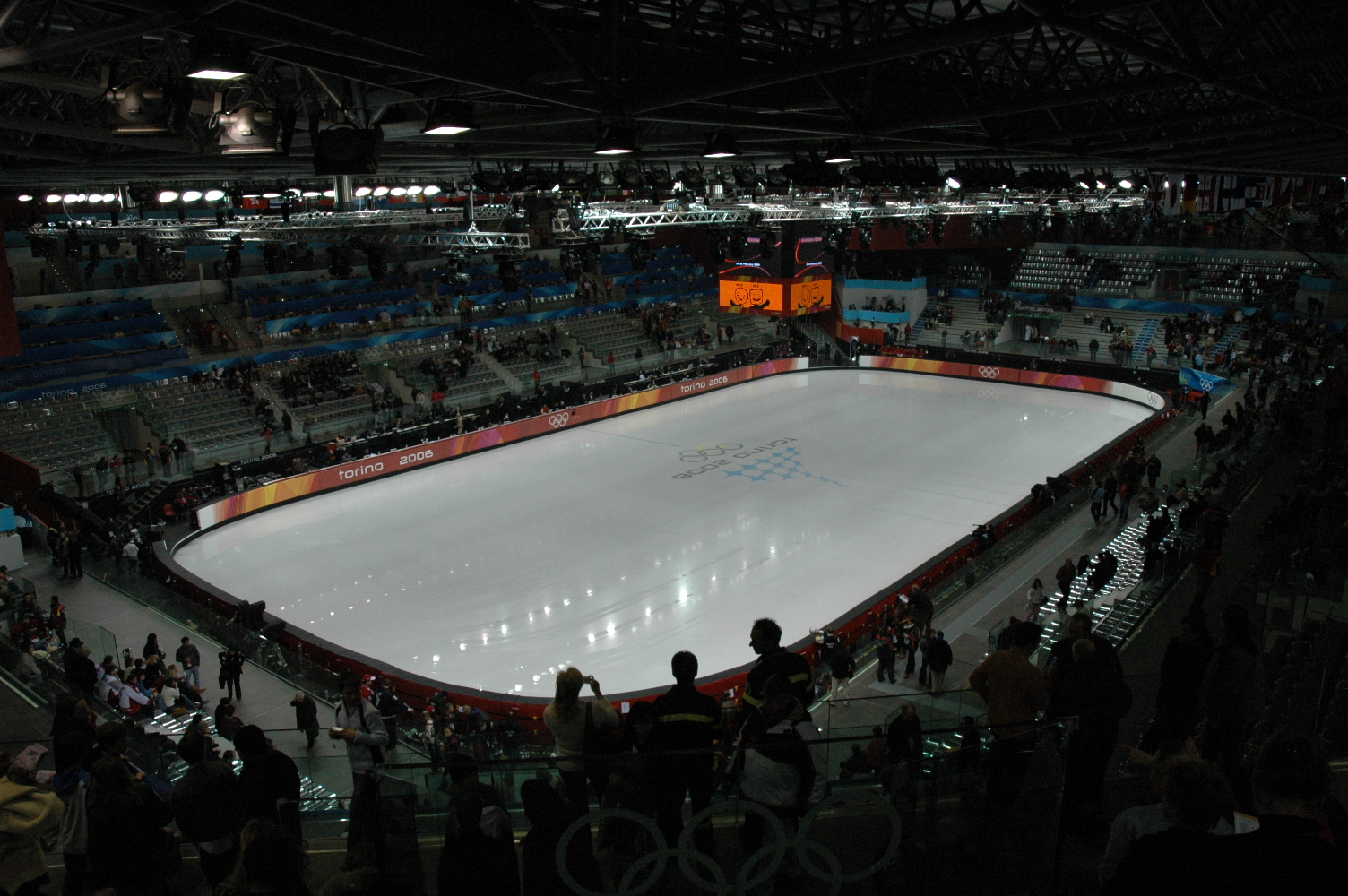
During the 2006 Winter Olympics, this ice rink was used for figure skating and short track speed skating.

A figure skating rink is an ice rink intended for or compatible with the practice of figure skating. In many locations, it is shared with other sports—typically ice hockey and/or short track speed skating.

== History ==
For most of the history of figure skating, ice skating was limited to short seasons and was possible only in countries with bodies of water that provided frozen surfaces and natural ice. According to figure skating historian James R. Hines, the development of indoor ice rinks, other than the development of the bladed skate during the 14th century and the practice of fastening boots permanently to skates in the 19th century, has had the greatest effect on figure skating. It allowed for skating year-round, as well as anywhere in the world, and prevented the cancellation of competitive events due to the lack of ice in outdoor rinks. Hines states that artificial ice prevents the impacts of harsh weather and "less-perfect outdoor ice" on skating elements.

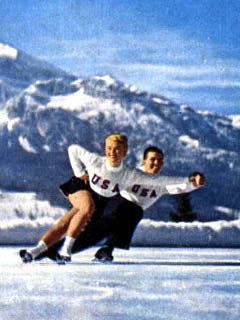
U.S. pairs team Lucille Ash and Sully Kothman performing on an outdoor rink at the 1956 Winter Olympics in Cortina d'Ampezzo, Italy

The first attempts to make artificial ice occurred during the 1870s in England and the U.S. The first notable indoor ice rink was made in 1876, by John Gamgee, in Chelsea along the north bank of the Thames River; it measured 24 by 40 feet. By the end of the 19th century, many major cities in Europe and North America had indoor rinks. The 1967 World Figure Skating Championships was last year a competition was held outdoors; also in 1967, it was required that competitions be conducted in covered, but not enclosed rinks. Enclosed indoor competitions were not required until 1980; they were not required for practice sessions until 1984. The last time figure skating during the Winter Olympic Games was held outdoors was in 1954 and the last time figure skating at the Winter Olympics was conducted in a covered but not indoor rink was in 1960. Although skaters no longer had to contend with the hazards of natural ice, an advantage in what has become a highly competitive sport, many skaters expressed nostalgia for competing on natural ice.

== Ice sheet ==
=== Dimensions ===
==== ISU-sanctioned competitions ====
In the modern era, the dimension requirements for ice figure skating have largely been aligned with those of other indoor ice sports. Rule 342 of the ISU's "Special Regulations & Technical Rules: Single & Pair Skating and Ice Dance" (S&P/ID) governs the dimensions of the skating area for the short program/short dance, free skating/free dance, and pattern dance(s). It must be rectangular. Its recommended and maximum dimensions are 60 metres (196 feet 10 inches) in length and 30 metres (98 feet 5 inches) in width. This is also the required size for the ISU's short track speed skating competitions and was the recommended size for IIHF ice hockey events prior to 2022. The rink's minimum dimensions for ISU figure skating competitions are 56 metres (183 feet 9 inches) in length and 26 metres (85 feet 4 inches) in width, which also matched the minimum IIHF requirements prior to 2014.

In the ISU's formative years, those requirements were significantly more modest. Its official rules, which encompassed the World Championships, stated that the free skate area must be "symmetrically bounded" and measure at least 35 metres (115 ft) in one direction.

==== Teaching and regional competitions ====
Figure skating's free-form nature and lack of head-to-head competition have allowed it to develop in places typically not accessible to other ice disciplines. In the middle of the 20th century, an important teaching tool for the sport were so-called ice skating studios, small sheets of artificial ice laid over the floor of a residential or otherwise repurposed building as semi-permanent facilities, similar to a dance studio. Some stars of yesteryear took their first strides or taught at such facilities.

The ISU has continued to take advantage of this relative flexibility. Rule 107 of its Constitution and General Regulations contains provisions for lower competition classes, labelled as "Interclub" or "Local". Those give national member federations and their clubs the leeway to stage events that are not directly sanctioned by the ISU, and may incorporate a number of self-defined rules. As a result, some of these competitions, including select national championships, have been held on ice surfaces smaller than the official minimum of 56 metre by 26 metre.

== Impact on performance ==
=== Judging ===
The scoring system rewards skaters who have good ice coverage, i.e. who efficiently cover the entire ice surface during their programs. If a rink has different dimensions, a skater's jump setup and speed may be hindered as he or she adjusts.

=== Ice quality ===
Ice quality is judged by smoothness, friction, hardness, and brittleness. Factors affecting ice quality include temperature, water quality, and usage, with toe picks causing more deterioration. For figure skating, the ice surface temperature is usually kept between −5.5 °C (22 °F) and −3.5 °C (26 °F), slightly warmer than an ice hockey rink, which means softer ice and easier landings for the figure skaters. Typically after every two warm-up groups during the competitions, an ice resurfacer cleans and smooths the surface of the ice sheet. Inadequate ice quality may affect skaters' performances.

== Venue and general configuration ==
Since 1980, all figure skating competitions have been held in completely covered and enclosed rinks. The rule was expanded to include practice rinks in 1984. At least one covered and preferably heated rink is required for international competitions. For ISU championships, the Olympic Winter Games, and the Winter Youth Olympic Games, two covered and closed rinks are required. For rinks at ISU events, the Olympics, the Youth Olympics, and the qualifying competition for the Olympics must be heated.

According to the S&P/ID, the ISU does not permit officials to be seated on the ice surface. The judges and the referee are seated at the rinkboard. The ISU prefers that the technical panel be seated in an elevated position.

=== Kiss and cry ===
The kiss and cry is the area in a figure skating rink where figure skaters wait for their marks to be announced after their performances during a figure skating competition. It is so named because the skaters and coaches often kiss to celebrate after a good performance, or cry after a poor one. The area is usually located in the corner or end of the rink and is furnished with a bench or chairs for the skaters and coaches and monitors to display the competition results. It is often elaborately decorated with flowers or some other backdrop for television shots and photos of the skaters as they react to their performance and scores.

== See also ==
- Ice rink
- Ice hockey rink
- Speed skating rink

== Works cited ==
- Hines, James R. (2006). Figure Skating: A History. Urbana, Illinois: University of Illinois Press. ISBN 978-0-252-07286-4. OCLC 59149288.
- Hines, James R. (2011). Historical Dictionary of Figure Skating. Lanham, Maryland: Scarecrow Press. ISBN 978-0-8108-6859-5.
- "Special Regulations & Technical Rules Single & Pair Skating and Ice Dance 2024". Lausanne, Switzerland: International Skating Union. Retrieved 20 June 2025 (S&P/ID 2024).
