= Halifax Common =

Park in Halifax, Nova Scotia, Canada

Coordinates: 44°38′57.86″N 63°35′21.39″W

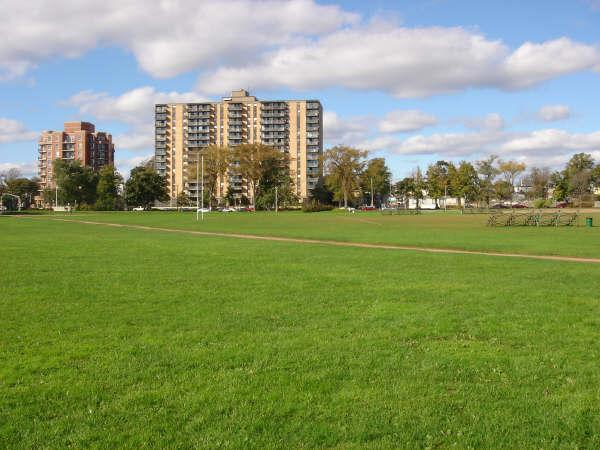
- A view of the North Common in 2005
- Interactive map of Halifax Common
- Type: Public park
- Location: Halifax, Nova Scotia
- Created: 1749
- Operator: Halifax Regional Municipality
- Open: Year round
- Public transit: Halifax Transit

The Halifax Common, in local popular usage often referred to as the Commons, is a Canadian urban park in Halifax, Nova Scotia. It is Canada’s oldest urban park.

== History ==
The Halifax Common was originally a lightly forested swampy area which formed the source of Freshwater Brook, which flowed into Halifax Harbour near the site of today's Pier 21. The Common was designated by surveyors following the settling of Halifax in 1749. It was created to serve three purposes. The first was to provide pasturage for horses and livestock, both by the military garrison and the citizens of Halifax. The second was to create a large area in which regiments stationed and in transit through Halifax could set up camps. The third and final reason was to provide clear fields of fire for the garrison of the Halifax Citadel, so that invading forces would have no cover in the event of an assault on the fort.

Originally, the Halifax Common stretched from Cunard Street, the current northern boundary of the North Common, south to South Street. The Saint Mary's Campus is part of the Collins Estate as is Gorsebrook Field to its immediate north. This has both Inglis Street (Saint Francis School and Gorsebrook School. With its eastern boundary at North Park, Ahern, Bell Road, and South Park, and Robie Street in to the west. During the 1800s, the city expanded in all directions, and some of this development encroached on the Common. Residential development spread up Spring Garden Road, cutting the Common in half. In addition, civic institutions were established on the Common, in keeping with its use as a public space. The Common became home to the Public Gardens, Camp Hill Cemetery and Camp Hill Hospital, Dalhousie University Medical Campus, the Civic, Victoria General, IWK and Grace hospitals, Citadel High School.

== Facilities ==
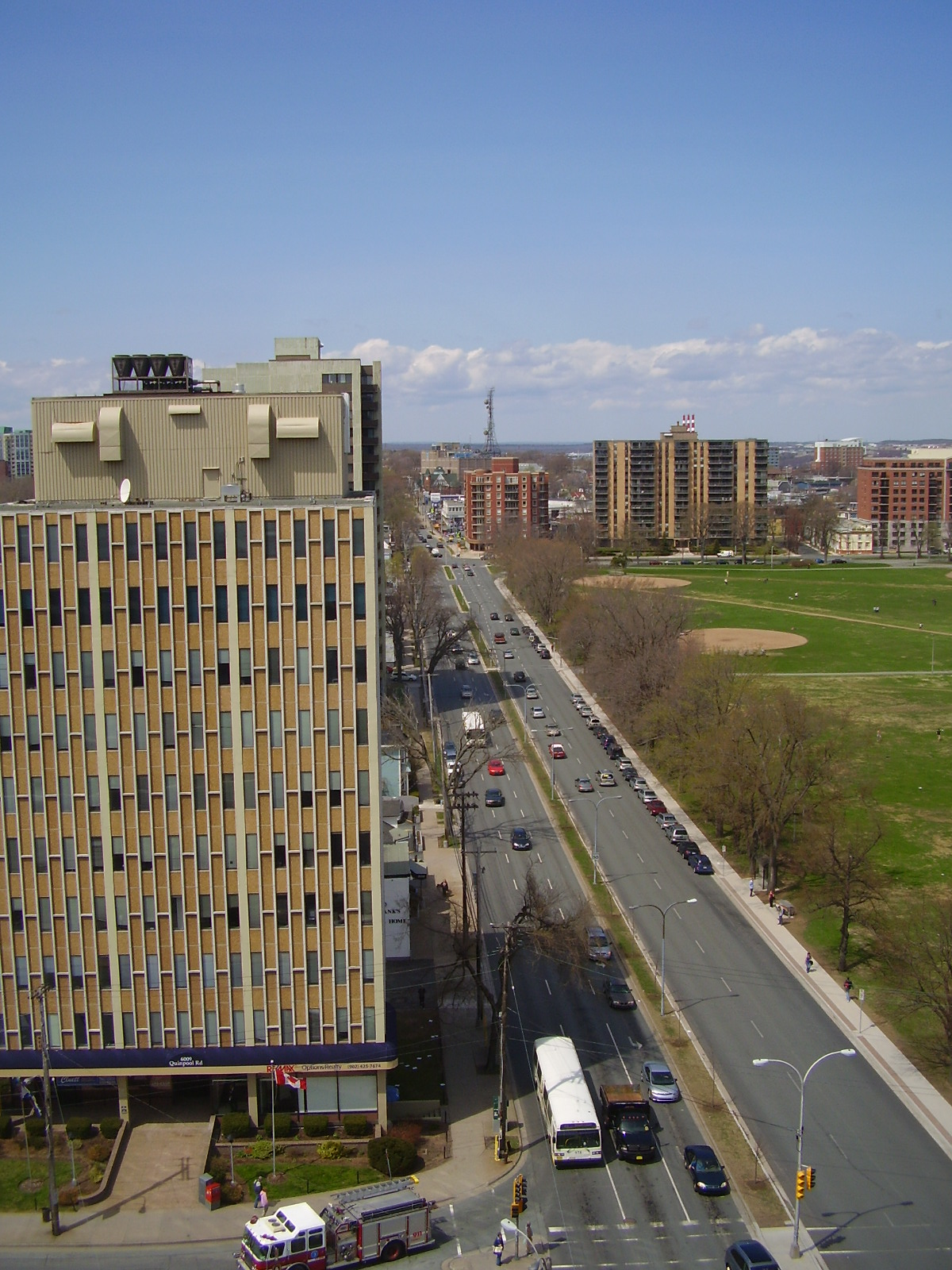
The western edge of the common along Robie Street

The North Common contains a cricket ground, several softball diamonds, a large fountain near the centre, tennis courts, a soccer field, an outdoor city-owned swimming pool, skateboarding facilities, and a smaller fountain. It is larger than the Central Common, and is much more empty and open, making it suitable for organized sporting and recreation events. A public washroom was recently built on Cunard Street.

Playgrounds were recently replaced on the Central Common, because of concerns due to toxicity levels in the soil beneath the playground. Arsenic from playground wood that had been treated with chromated copper arsenate (CCA, which has since been discontinued in playground use in Halifax) had leached from the playground wood, into the soil.

Across Cogswell St from the Pavilion is the Emera Oval, a 400-metre skating track. Originally constructed to host speed skating events in the 2011 Canadian Masters Championships and the 2011 Canada Games, the oval was slated to be removed in March 2011, but due to its overwhelming popularity, it was made a permanent fixture.

As of January 2014, it is going into its second winter as a permanent fixture. It is open for public and speed skating sessions and the ice surface opens for supervised skates as soon as weather conditions are sufficiently cold. During the warmer seasons it remains open for other uses. The summer of 2013 marked the beginning of inline activities offered by the city - supervised inline/ roller skating times with free rentals of inline and roller skates just as ice skates are rented out for free during public skates during the winter.

Construction on a renovation of the Common's aquatic area, with pool, splash pad, and related facilities, is anticipated after the 2021 season. The $17 million project includes demolition of existing facilities (pools, playground, pavilion). It is anticipated to open for the 2023 season.

== Location ==
The Halifax Common is centrally located on the Halifax peninsula, about a five-minute walk to and from Downtown Halifax.

The square-shaped North Common is bordered by Cunard Street to the north, North Park street to the east, Cogswell street to the south, and Robie Street to the west. The Central Common is triangle shaped and is bordered by Cogswell Street to the north, Bell Road to the south-west, and Trollope Street to the south-east.

== Events ==
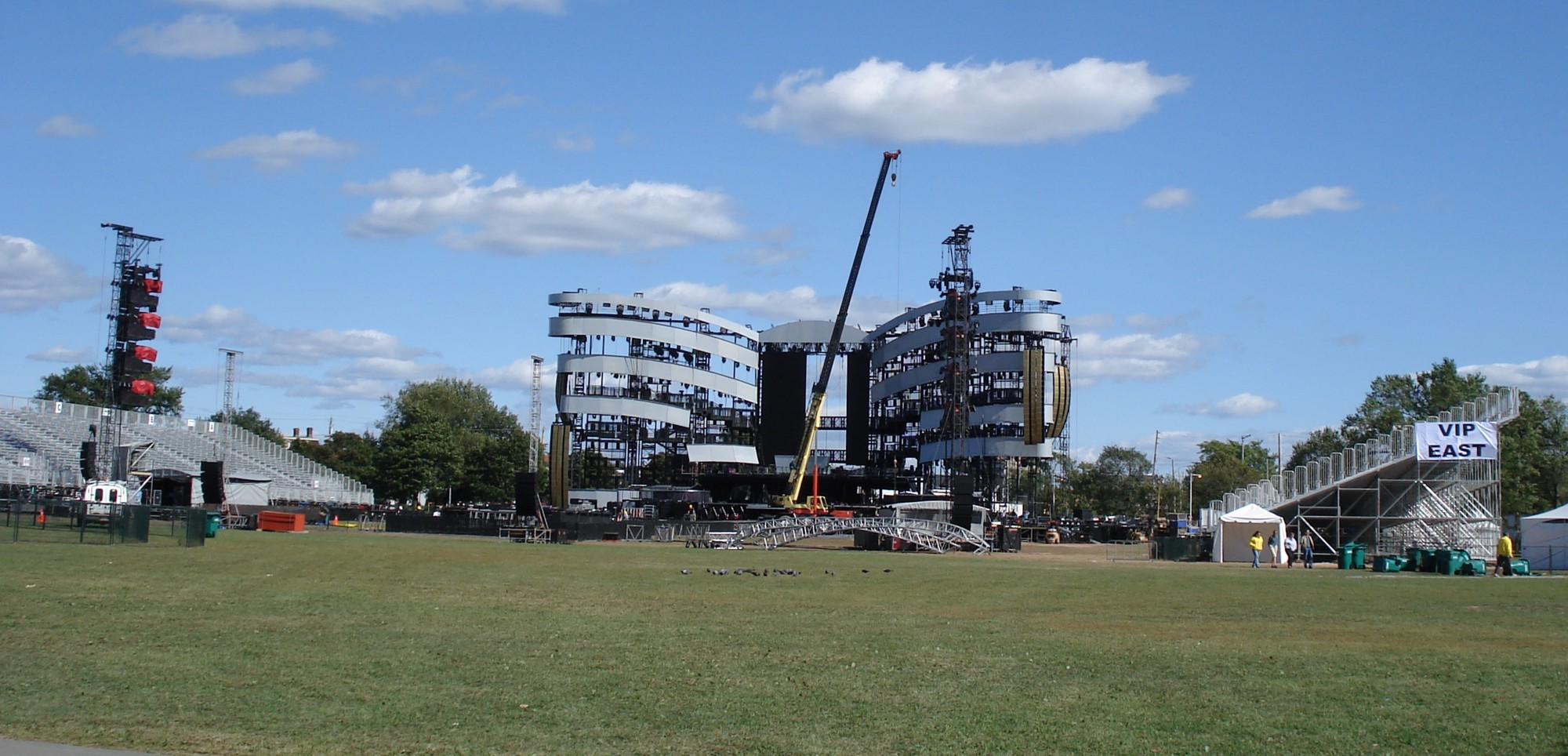
The North Common on September 22, 2006. This performance stage was being prepared for a Rolling Stones concert.

The Common is now a popular outdoor concert venue for the Halifax region. With its central location, it has direct walking access (approx. five to ten minutes walking east on Cogswell Street or Rainnie Drive) to Downtown Halifax and the Barrington Street Halifax Transit public transit terminal, with services providing connections to the rest of the city, the Halifax harbour ferry connecting with Downtown Dartmouth and Woodside, as well as the new Bus Rapid Transit service MetroLink. During these shows, concert express and shuttle buses run directly to and from Common Park from various locations and are designated to operate along with the regular service Metro Transit offers.

Events held at the Halifax Common
Date	Event name	Performers	Event Attendance
1983	Royal Visit	Prince Charles and Diana, Princess of Wales	est. 30,000–40,000
1984	Papal Visit	Pope John Paul II	80,000
September 23, 2006	A Bigger Bang Tour	Rolling Stones, Kanye West, Alice Cooper, Sloan	50,000
August 30, 2008	Country Rocks 2008	Keith Urban, Charlie Major, Johnny Reid, Aaron Pritchett, Gretchen Wilson, Jimmy Rankin, Great Big Sea	paid attendance 11,853
July 11, 2009	Paul McCartney Live on the Common	Paul McCartney, Joel Plaskett, Wintersleep, Sierra Noble	paid attendance of 26,504
July 18, 2009	Halifax Rocks 2009	Kiss, Thornley, The Trews, Econoline Crush, The Novaks, Children of Eve, Frankie Whyte	paid attendance of 21,402
June 24–28, 2010	Grand Chief Membertou 400 (Mawiomi Pow-wow) & Royal Visit	Royal Visit by Queen Elizabeth II, Buffy Sainte-Marie, Schedule of events	Unknown
July 24, 2010	Halifax Rocks 2010	The Black Eyed Peas, Weezer, Classified, Hot Hot Heat, Rich Aucoin, The Jimmy Swift Band, The Stanfields, Chad Hatcher	paid attendance of 8,362
August 6 & 7 2010	Country Rocks 2010	Aug 6: Johnny Reid, George Canyon, One More Girl Aug 7: Alan Jackson, Billy Currington, Kevin Costner and Modern West, Lonestar	-
January 15, 16 2011	Canadian Masters Championships	Canada Games Oval	-
February 11–27, 2011	2011 Canada Games.	Canada Games Oval- long track speed skating competitions .	-
July 1, 2017	Canada Day Concert	Deadmau5, Reeny Smith, Rebecca Thomas, Matt Mays.	

Notes

Pre-2000

- In 1983, Prince Charles and Diana, Princess of Wales were greeted by a large crowd on the Common during a visit to Halifax.
- In 1984, 80,000 faithful attended a service by Pope John Paul II at the Common.

2006

- The Rolling Stones played on the Common as part of their A Bigger Bang Tour. It was the largest concert the city has ever undertaken at the time, and a test-run for more concerts in the future. With an attendance of approx 55,000, the event was considered a success.

2009

- June/July 2009: In preparation for the upcoming events season on the Common, the City of Halifax invested a great amount of effort and money into preparing the Common for the concerts and future events. Ground preparation, amenities, grass seeding were all part of the effort to cut down on damaging effects from heavy equipment and foot traffic during the large events.
- July 11, a performance by Paul McCartney drew a reported crowd of 50,000 to the Common.

2010

- Grand Chief Membertou is a 4-day event held to celebrate the life and inspiration of Mi'kmaq saqamaw Henri Membertou.
- Queen Elizabeth II's Royal visit to Canada began in Halifax and during her first afternoon in the city had stopped at the Common to experience and take part in the Membertou 400 celebration.
- Halifax Rocks 2010 was originally to be a 2-day music festival held on the Common, however due to reasons not released by the concert promoter, the Friday concert, featuring Kid Rock and Counting Crows had been cancelled. However The Jimmy Swift Band and The Stanfields were added to the Saturday bill.

== See also ==
- Halifax Armoury
- Parks in Halifax, Nova Scotia
