= The Theatre Arts Guild =

The Theatre Arts Guild (TAG) of Halifax, Nova Scotia, is second Canada's oldest continuously operated community theatre.

== History ==
In 1931, the Little Theatre Movement and the Halifax Dramatic and Musical Club merged to found the TAG. The first director was Sidney Culverwell Oland.

A.A. Milne's The Dover Road was the group's first production in May 1931 at the Garrick Theatre (now the Neptune Theatre).

During World War II, rather than plays, the focus was concert parties for the troops before their deployment overseas.

TAG has had several homes including the Capitol Theatre, the former College Street School, and the gymnasiums of HMCS Scotian and St. Patrick's High School. In 1966, TAG purchased and renovated a former church hall at 6 Parkhill Road as a permanent home and named it "The Pond Playhouse." A major expansion was begun in 2005. The Pond Playhouse can accommodate up to 90 audience members.

== Company ==
TAG's mandate in its Act of Incorporation is "to promote the study, practice and knowledge of the dramatic and musical arts in the city of Halifax and the neighbourhood". The company is entirely run by volunteers.

TAG's season runs from September through July. Five shows are presented of all types: musicals, comedies, mysteries and dramas, plus an ever-popular Christmas pantomime. Other activities include workshops, poetry readings and an annual members' Variety Night.

== Productions ==
TAG's past productions have included: Marion Bridge (2022–2023 season), Dracula – the Bloody Truth (2021–2022 season; originally scheduled for 2020 and postponed due to the pandemic), Thought, Word, and Deed (2020‐2021 season), The Ladies Foursome (2019‐2020 season), and The Full Monty (2013–2014 season).

== See also ==
- Culture of the Halifax Regional Municipality
- Le Cercle Molière
