= Speed skating at the 2011 Canada Winter Games =

Speed skating at the 2011 Canada Winter Games was held at the permanent Canada Games Oval in Halifax, Nova Scotia.

The events were held during the first week between February 12 and 16, 2011.

== Men ==
Event	Gold		Silver		Bronze	
100 m	Laurent Dubreuil; Quebec	10.03	Hewson Elliott; Manitoba	10.31	Benjamin Tam; Alberta	10.34
500 m	Laurent Dubreuil; Quebec	1:14.67 (37.50 and 37.17)	Antoine Gélinas-Beaulieu; Quebec	1:17.56 (38.69 and 38.87)	Benjamin Tam; Alberta	1:18.20 (39.21 and 38.99)
1500 m	Antoine Gélinas-Beaulieu; Quebec	1:59.03	Laurent Dubreuil; Quebec	2:02.23	François Déry; Quebec	2:05.23
3000 m	Antoine Gélinas-Beaulieu; Quebec	4:14.65	François Déry; Quebec	4:18.79	Laurent Dubreuil; Quebec	4:22.86
5000 m Super	Antoine Gélinas-Beaulieu; Quebec	7:09.62	François Déry; Quebec	7:15.56	Connor McConvey; Ontario	7:28.50
Team pursuit	Antoine Gélinas-Beaulieu; François Déry; Laurent Dubreuil; Daniel Dubreuil; Quebec	4:23.65	Ryan Bernhard; Axel Morin; Pieter Stoffel; Michael Wrubleski; Saskatchewan	4:30.56	Brett Appleyard; Chris Daeninck; Milo Del Bigio; Hewson Elliott; Manitoba	4:32.30

== Women ==
Event	Gold		Silver		Bronze	
100 m	Heather McLean; Manitoba	11.33	Izzy Dilger; Alberta	11.46	Kate Hanly; Alberta	11.53
500 m	Jennessa Kemp; Alberta	1:25.10 (43.01 and 42.09)	Kate Hanly; Alberta	1:25.95 (43.24 and 42.71)	Izzy Dilger; Alberta	1:26.51 (43.89 and 42.62)
1000 m	Kate Hanly; Alberta	1:23.98	Jennessa Kemp; Alberta	1:25.35	Tori Spence; British Columbia	1:27.23
1500 m	Jennessa Kemp; Alberta	2:15.35	Kate Hanly; Alberta	2:18.10	Tori Spence; British Columbia	2:18.56
3000 m Super	Tori Spence; British Columbia	4:46.70	Léa Thibault; Quebec	4:54.72	Josie Spence; British Columbia	4:55.01
Team pursuit	Ali Banwell; Sarah Pousette; Josie Spence; Tori Spence; British Columbia	3:36.62	Isabelle Carrier; Noémie Fiset; Mèryem Labidi; Léa Thibault; Quebec	3:37.45	Jennessa Kemp; Kate Hanly; Izzy Dilger; Kimberley Bates; Alberta	3:38.38
