= The Pavilion (Halifax) =

- Halifax Pavilion
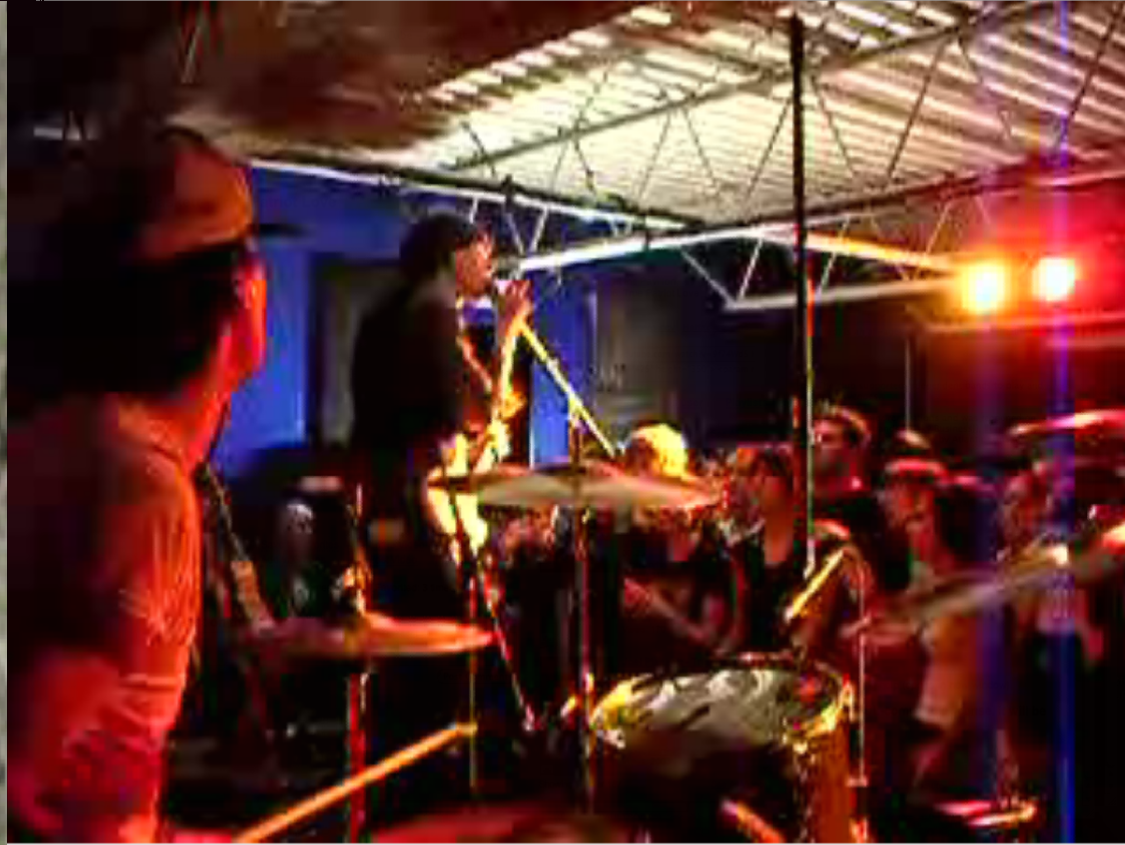
- Joel Plaskett and The Emergency playing at The Pavilion
- Interactive map of The Pavilion
- Address: 5816 Cogswell St. Halifax, Nova Scotia; Canada
- Coordinates: 44°38′53″N 63°35′18″W
- Type: Music venue

Construction
- Opened: 1998
- Closed: 2014

The Pavilion, also known as the Halifax Pavilion, was an all-ages music venue in Halifax, Nova Scotia, Canada. It operated from 1998 until its official closing in 2014. Following the closing, the Pavilion Youth Association maintained use of the space until 2022, when it became a temporary shelter for unhoused persons in Halifax.

== History ==
The Pavilion was located at 5816 Cogswell Street, on the Halifax Common. The building, a former storage shed for a swimming pool, opened as an all-ages music venue in 1998. It was initially operated by Condon MacLeod and received funding from the Halifax Regional Municipality. In the early 2000s, the venue was a key location for the Halifax all-ages music scene.

In 2003, Halifax City Council shut down the Pavilion for renovations related to the electrical and fire codes. It reopened in 2004 under the management of Chris Smith. The Pavilion was voted the Best All-Ages Venue in Halifax by reader polls in The Coast from 2008 to 2014. Over the summer of 2009, the Pavilion was closed for renovations. Chris Smith, the venue's proprietor at the time, cited declining business, particularly over the previous few summers, in his reasoning for the timing of the renovations. The Pavilion subsequently remained closed for summers as the all-ages crowd was more difficult to reach when school was not in session. In 2010, the Pavilion switched from a for-profit model to a not-for-profit. In early 2014, the Pavilion was outfitted with solar panels as part of the Halifax's Solar City Program.

In 2014, the Pavilion officially shut down as a music venue following city budget cuts. It was, however, kept alive by the Pavilion Youth Association (PYA) and other organizers backing the Bring Back Our Pavilion project. The fundraising efforts for this project resulted in several concerts in 2016. In 2017, the Halifax Commons Master Plan made clear that the PYA would have to give up the building at some point in the future. In 2022, the Nova Scotia Department of Community Services declared the building would be used to provide temporary shelter to unhoused persons in Halifax until March 31 of that year. The transformation of the Pavilion into a shelter meant the PYA had to move out, though they were not given warning by city council.
