= Fiona McQueen (rheumatologist) =

First woman professor of rheumatology in New Zealand

- Occupations: Rheumatologist, children's writer, environmental activist

Academic background
- Education: University of Auckland
- Thesis: Investigations into the immunopathology of inflammatory arthritis (1996)
- Doctoral advisor: John Gordon Buchanan, Ian James Simpson, Mark Thomas, Kathryn Crosier

Academic work
- Institutions: University of Auckland, University of Otago

Fiona Marion Florence McQueen is a New Zealand rheumatologist, environmentalist and children's writer, and was a full professor at the University of Auckland before retiring to run a private herbalist practice in Glenorchy in Otago. She was New Zealand's first woman professor of rheumatology.

== Academic career ==
McQueen graduated from the University of Otago with a MB Chb in 1980, and worked as a consultant rheumatologist in New Zealand. She completed a PhD titled Investigations into the immunopathology of inflammatory arthritis at the University of Auckland in 1996. McQueen then joined the faculty of the University of Auckland, rising to full professor in 2009. She was New Zealand's first woman professor of rheumatology, and is an honorary clinical professor at the University of Otago. McQueen used magnetic resonance imaging to show the development of bone erosion in rheumatoid arthritis, and published a ten-year longitudinal study that was "the first of its kind and identified the central importance of osteitis in the development of bone erosion in rheumatoid arthritis". Consultant rheumatologist Nicola Dalbeth nominated her as one of the "25 great women" in rheumatology.

McQueen's lifelong hobby of tramping led to an interest in conservation, and in 2017 she published a book arguing against the use of 1080 for pest control in New Zealand forests.

McQueen is also a children's writer, having written two books out of a planned trilogy about the adventures of a marmot and a squirrel, Roderick and the Wizard of Endor, and Roderick and the Creeping Evil.

== Selected works ==
=== Books ===
- McQueen, F. M. (2019). Roderick and the Wizard of Endor: A Magical Adventure. Glenorchy: Fiona McQueen.
- McQueen, F. M. (2021). Roderick and the Creeping Evil. Tross Publishing.
- McQueen, Fiona M. F. (2017). The Quiet Forest: The Case Against Aerial 1080. Tross Publishing. ISBN 978-1-872970-55-4.

=== Other ===
- McQueen, Fiona (14 January 2019). "Cruel poisons will never bring back the birdsong". Stuff.
- McQueen, Fiona Marion Florence (2017). "Rheumatology around the world: perspectives from Australia and New Zealand". Arthritis Research & Therapy. 19 (1): 24. doi:10.1186/s13075-017-1246-8. PMC 5301384. PMID 28183342. Wikidata Q42322540.
- Mikkel Østergaard; Charles Peterfy; McQueen, Fiona Marion Florence; et al. (2003). "OMERACT Rheumatoid Arthritis Magnetic Resonance Imaging Studies. Core set of MRI acquisitions, joint pathology definitions, and the OMERACT RA-MRI scoring system". The Journal of Rheumatology. 30 (6): 1385–1386. PMID 12784422. Wikidata Q35144341.
- H Ralph Schumacher; Taylor, William John; Edwards, Richard Lawrence; et al. (2009). "Outcome domains for studies of acute and chronic gout". The Journal of Rheumatology. 36 (10): 2342–2345. doi:10.3899/jrheum.090370. PMID 19820223. Wikidata Q43263723.
- Gabriëlle M N Daleboudt; Broadbent, Elizabeth Anne; McQueen, Fiona Marion Florence; Ad A Kaptein (2010). "Intentional and unintentional treatment nonadherence in patients with systemic lupus erythematosus". Arthritis Care and Research. 63 (3): 342–350. doi:10.1002/acr.20411. PMID 21120967. Wikidata Q50655773.
- Mikkel Ostergaard; McQueen, Fiona Marion Florence; Charlotte Wiell; et al. (2009). "The OMERACT psoriatic arthritis magnetic resonance imaging scoring system (PsAMRIS): definitions of key pathologies, suggested MRI sequences, and preliminary scoring system for PsA Hands". The Journal of Rheumatology. 36 (8): 1816–1824. doi:10.3899/jrheum.090352. PMID 19671819. Wikidata Q37578148.
