= Kathryn Crosier =

New Zealand haematologist

Kathryn Crosier ONZM
- Born: Kathryn Elizabeth Barnett
- Education: University of Auckland
- Scientific career
- Fields: Haematology; molecular medicine
- Workplaces: University of Auckland
- Thesis: The regulation of human haemopoiesis by cytokines (1988)
- Doctoral students: Fiona McQueen

Kathryn Elizabeth Crosier ONZM (née Barnett) is a New Zealand academic, a clinical haematologist, and is an emeritus professor at the University of Auckland, specialising in molecular medicine. In 2005, she was appointed an Officer of the New Zealand Order of Merit for services to medicine.

== Academic career ==
Crosier completed a medical degree at the University of Otago followed by a PhD titled The regulation of human haemopoiesis by cytokines at the University of Auckland in 1988. Crosier then joined the faculty of the University of Auckland, rising to full professor as Professor of Molecular Medicine and Pathology. Crosier is a clinical haematologist, and her husband Philip Crosier is also an emeritus professor of the university. Crosier is a Fellow of the Royal Australasian College of Physicians and a Fellow of the Royal College of Pathologists of Australasia. Crosier was appointed Associate Deputy Vice-Chancellor (Research) for PBRF at the university in 2010.

Crosier served as a member of the New Zealand Blood Service, being appointed in 2003 for a three year term, and subsequently reappointed in 2006 for a second term.

Crosier's research interests include medical genetics, leukaemia and stem cell development. Crosier was part of a team that announced a breakthrough in understanding of the formation of lymphatic vessels in 2019. The research, funded by the Health Research Council, the Marsden fund and the Auckland Medical Research Foundation, involved a collaboration between researchers at Auckland, the University of Münster and the University of Queensland. Researchers used fluorescent zebra fish to show that lymphatic vessels can develop through different routes, rather than from blood vessels as previously thought. The findings have relevance to the development of treatments for lymphedoema, a common condition resulting from some cancer treatments.

One of Crosier's notable doctoral students is rheumatologist Fiona McQueen.

== Honours and awards ==
In the 2005 New Year Honours, Crosier was appointed an Officer of the New Zealand Order of Merit, for services to medicine.

== Private life ==
She is married to Phil Crosier, an emeritus professor of molecular medicine and pathology at the University of Auckland.

== Selected works ==
- Chris Hall; Maria Vega Flores; Thilo Storm; Kathy Crosier; Phil Crosier (4 May 2007). "The zebrafish lysozyme C promoter drives myeloid-specific expression in transgenic fish". BMC Developmental Biology. 7: 42. doi:10.1186/1471-213x-7-42. ISSN 1471-213X. PMC 1877083. PMID 17477879. Wikidata Q30479482.
- Julia Horsfield; Sasha H Anagnostou; Jimmy Kuang-Hsien Hu; Kitty Hsiao Yu Cho; Robert Geisler; Graham Lieschke; Kathryn E Crosier; Philip S Crosier (13 June 2007). "Cohesin-dependent regulation of Runx genes". Development. 134 (14): 2639–2649. doi:10.1242/dev.002485. ISSN 0950-1991. PMID 17567667. Wikidata Q47074017.
- Maggie L Kalev-Zylinska; Julia A Horsfield; Maria Vega C Flores; John H Postlethwait; Maria R Vitas; Andrea M Baas; Philip S Crosier; Kathryn E Crosier (1 April 2002). "Runx1 is required for zebrafish blood and vessel development and expression of a human RUNX1-CBF2T1 transgene advances a model for studies of leukemogenesis". Development. 129 (8): 2015–2030. ISSN 0950-1991. PMID 11934867. Wikidata Q38290513.
- Enid Yi Ni Lam; Christopher J Hall; Philip S Crosier; Kathryn E Crosier; Maria Vega Flores (7 May 2010). "Live imaging of Runx1 expression in the dorsal aorta tracks the emergence of blood progenitors from endothelial cells". Blood. 116 (6): 909–914. doi:10.1182/blood-2010-01-264382. ISSN 0006-4971. PMID 20453160. Wikidata Q50554047.
- Christopher J Hall; Rachel H Boyle; Jonathan W Astin; et al. (1 August 2013). "Immunoresponsive gene 1 augments bactericidal activity of macrophage-lineage cells by regulating β-oxidation-dependent mitochondrial ROS production". Cell Metabolism. 18 (2): 265–278. doi:10.1016/j.cmet.2013.06.018. ISSN 1550-4131. PMID 23931757. Wikidata Q38313510.
- Kazuhide S. Okuda; Jonathan W. Astin; June P Misa; Maria V Flores; Kathryn E Crosier; Philip S Crosier (23 May 2012). "lyve1 expression reveals novel lymphatic vessels and new mechanisms for lymphatic vessel development in zebrafish". Development. 139 (13): 2381–2391. doi:10.1242/dev.077701. ISSN 0950-1991. PMC 4074227. PMID 22627281. Wikidata Q30581891.
- Maria Vega Flores; Vicky Wai Kei Tsang; Wenjue Hu; Maggie Kalev-Zylinska; John Postlethwait; Philip Crosier; Kathryn Crosier; Shannon Fisher (1 September 2004). "Duplicate zebrafish runx2 orthologues are expressed in developing skeletal elements". Gene Expression Patterns. 4 (5): 573–581. doi:10.1016/j.modgep.2004.01.016. ISSN 1567-133X. PMID 15261836. Wikidata Q47073997.
