= Hosfeld =

Hosfeld is a surname of several possible origins: from a place called Hosenfeld near Fulda (Hesse), a variant of Hossfeld, or possibly a corruption of English Horsfield. Notable people with the surname include:

- Ian Hosfeld, comic book artist
- Rolf Hosfeld (born 1948), Academic Director of the Potsdam Lepsius House in Germany
- Scott Hosfeld (born 1960), American composer and musician
- Wolfgang Hosfeld (born 1947), German actor
