= André Lussier =

Canadian rheumatologist (1933–2009)

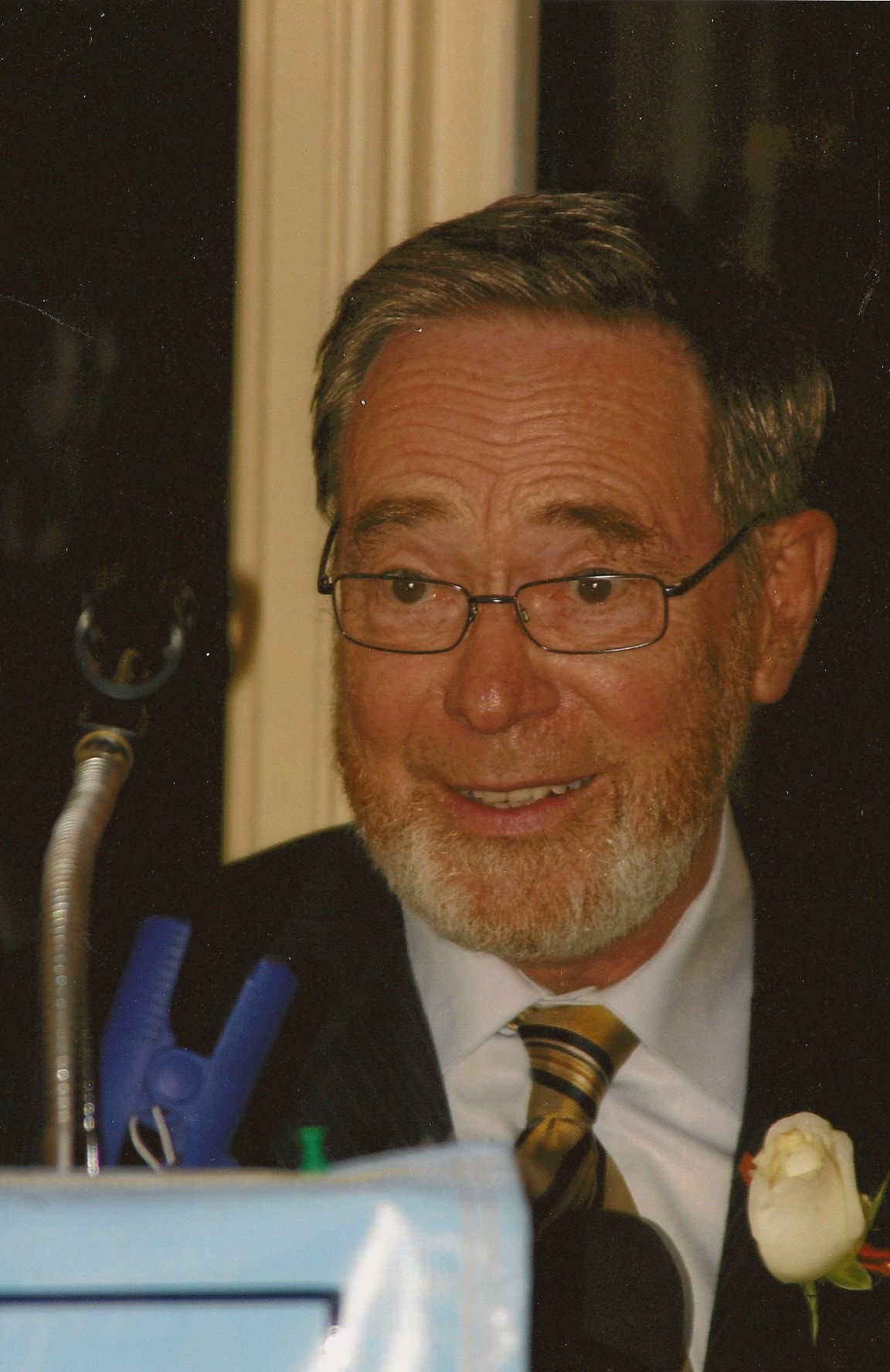
- Born: May 27, 1933; Sherbrooke, Quebec, Canada
- Died: July 21, 2009 (aged 76); Sherbrooke, Quebec
- Education: Université de Montréal
- Known for: Pioneer of clinical and scientific Rheumatology in Canada and contributions to the discovery of the treatment of gout
- Awards: Honorary member of the French Society for Rheumatology (Société Française de Rhumatologie) since 1980, Distinguished Rheumatologist Award Canadian Rheumatology Association (1999), Professor emeritus of the Université de Sherbrooke in 1999, Queen Elizabeth II Golden Jubilee Medal in 2002
- Scientific career
- Fields: Rheumatology, medicine, gout
- Workplaces: Medical School of the Université de Sherbrooke and Medical Center (Centre Hospitalier Universitaire de Sherbrooke) (1968-2009), Verdun Hospital in Montreal (1964-1967)

André Lussier (1933–2009) was a physician, rheumatologist, and professor at the School of Medicine of the Université de Sherbrooke, Quebec, Canada. He was born and died in Sherbrooke. He completed his classical studies and Baccalauréat ès-art at the Séminaire Oblat de Chambly and at the Collège de Montréal (Université de Montréal). He then completed his residency in internal medicine at the Hôpital Notre-Dame de Montréal. From 1963 to 1964, he pursued a "clinical and research fellowship" in rheumatology at the University of Pennsylvania under the supervision of Dr. Joseph Hollander. In 1969, he joined the founding clinicians and researchers of the School of Medicine of the Université de Sherbrooke and he established the first Section of Rheumatology officially recognized in Québec. In 1970, he wrote the white paper upon which the specialty of rheumatology is recognized in Québec, two years before its recognition as a specialty elsewhere in North America. In 1975, he co-founded The Journal of Rheumatology, of which he remained the co-Editor until his death. He was the first Director of the Clinical Research Center. of the Centre Hospitalier Universitaire de Sherbrooke (CHUS) from 1980 to 1984. During his career, he was president of several scientific meetings and conferences (e.g.Canadian Society of Rheumatology, Pan-American League of Associations for Rheumatology PANLAR). He has published over 230 scientific articles and is the author of three books.
