= Horsfield =

Horsfield may refer to:

== Surname ==
- Andy Horsfield, British music industry entrepreneur
- Arthur Horsfield (born 1946), English football striker
- Craigie Horsfield (born 1949, English artist and photographer
- Debbie Horsfield (born 1955), English theatre and television writer
- Geoff Horsfield (born 1973), English footballer
- George Horsfield (1882-1956), British architect and archaeologist
- Gordon Horsfield (1913–1982), Australian cricketer
- James Horsfield (born 1995), English footballer
- Julia Horsfield, New Zealand biochemist and developmental geneticist
- Kate Horsfield (born 1944), American artist
- Kenneth Horsfield, George Medal recipient
- Neil Horsfield (born 1966), Welsh athlete
- Noel Horsfield (1913–1988), South African Olympic sailor
- Sam Horsfield (born 1996), English professional golfer
- Susan Horsfield (born 1928), British artist
- Thomas Horsfield (1775–1859), American physician and naturalist
- Thomas Walker Horsfield (christened 1792-1837), English minister and historian

== Places ==
- Horsfield Bay, New South Wales, Australia
- The Horsfield, a cricket ground in Colne, Lancashire, England

== See also ==
- - Horsfield's tortoise, a species
- Horsefield (disambiguation)
- Horfield, a suburb of the city of Bristol, southwest England
