= South End, Halifax =

Coordinates: 44°38′5.9″N 63°34′58.9″W

South End
- Neighbourhood
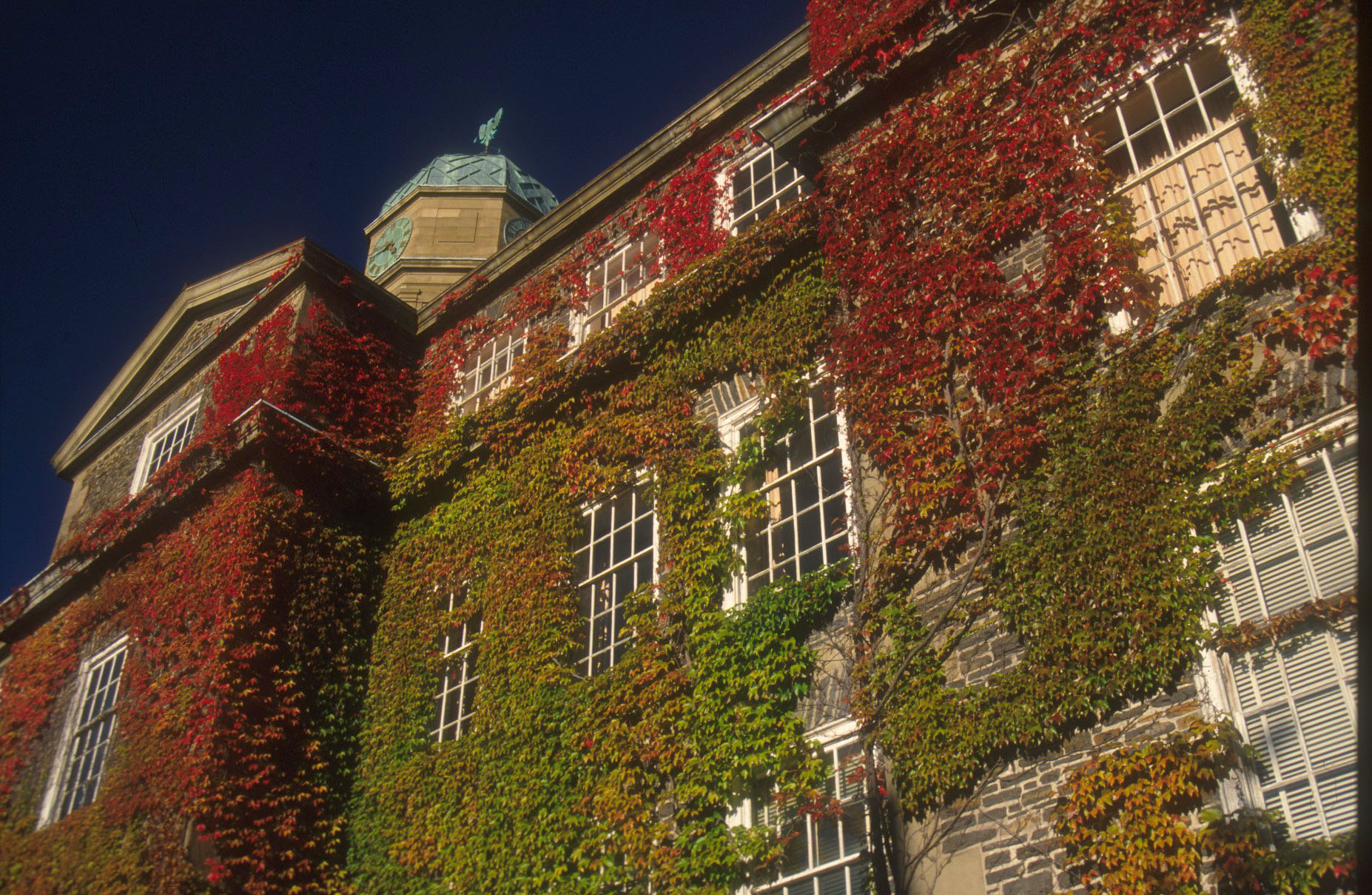
- The vine-covered Henry Hicks building at Dalhousie University
- Interactive map of South End
- Country: Canada
- Province: Nova Scotia
- Municipality: Halifax
- Community: Halifax
- Municipal District: District 7 (Halifax South Downtown)
- Postal codes: B3J
- Area Codes: 782, 902

The South End is a neighbourhood within Halifax's urban area, in the Municipality of Halifax, Nova Scotia, Canada.

== History ==
The areas south of South Street and west of the South Common were largely farmland and mixed-forest which led to the development of large estates that took advantage of their proximity to the former City of Halifax and garrison.

Over time, neighbourhoods began to develop outside the original city boundary and were annexed by the city.

In 1918, one of Halifax's largest projects saw the completion of a major railway line, to serve a new railway station at the south end of the city's central business district. The new railway line had been under construction by the Intercolonial Railway and later Canadian Government Railways at the time of the Halifax Explosion, which blocked and badly damaged the city's North Street station. The project created an approximately 30 m (98 ft) deep rock-cut for several kilometres, parallel the shore of the Northwest Arm. The new railway line through the South End was rushed into completion to accommodate the unexpected disaster. One result of the building of this railway line has been to geographically isolate parts of the peninsula, creating opportunities for wealthy and exclusive neighbourhoods to develop. Another legacy of the blasting work created during the construction of the South End railway cut was the infilling of parts of the Bedford Basin and Halifax Harbour to create freight-and-passenger ship docks, and railway yards.

== Geography ==
The South End is located on the southern half of the Halifax Peninsula. The neighbourhood was originally bounded on the south by South Street and was the few blocks located south of Citadel Hill.

== Demographics ==
The South End has become the most prosperous region of Halifax, with a middle-class demographic.

The neighbourhood contains Halifax's densest census tract; census tract 2050004.02. Although the census tract has a small landmass of approximately 48.2 ha (119 acres), 5,466 people live within the area. The population density is approximately 113 people per hectare (approximately 11,300 people per km^{2}).

== Parks and recreation ==
Throughout the neighbourhood, the South End has many places where recreational activities can be enjoyed.

Sports Complexes

- Dalplex
- Dauphinee Centre
- Huskies Stadium

Community Centres

- The Local Council of Women Halifax
- Regional Residential Services Society
- UpLift

Fields

- Gorsebrook Ball Field
- St. Francis Ball Field
- Wickwire Pitch

Libraries

There are several academic libraries in the South End.

Museums

- Canadian Museum of Immigration at Pier 21
- Thomas McCulloch Museum

Parks

- Balcom Square
- Gorsebrook Park
- Grainery Park
- Marlborough Woods Park
- Peace and Friendship Park
- Point Pleasant Park
- Raymond Taavel Park
- The Halifax Urban Greenway Park

Pools

- Dalplex
- The Waegwoltic Club

Trails

- The Halifax Urban Greenway Park

== Transportation ==
The South End of Halifax is in a dense part of the Municipality of Halifax with different ways to travel.

There are many kilometres of avenues, lanes, roads, and streets that criss-cross throughout the neighbourhood. Robie Street which bisects the neighbourhood, and starts in the South End, is the main thoroughfare through the neighbourhood-and-the Halifax Peninsula. It runs approximately 4 km (2.5 mi), and eventually continues-on as Massachusetts Avenue.

On 1161 Hollis Street, Via Rail operates Halifax station.

The neighbourhood is serviced by many public transit routes, which is provided by Halifax Transit.

Halifax Transit Routes

- Route 4 (Universities)
- Route 7A (Peninsula) (clockwise route)
- Route 7B (Peninsula) (counter-clockwise route)
- Route 10 (Dalhousie)
- Route 24 (Leiblin Park)
- Route 29 (Barrington)
- Route 41 (Dalhousie-Dartmouth)
- Route 84 (Glendale)
- Route 135 (Flamingo Express)
- Route 136 (Farnham Gate Express)
- Route 137 (Clayton Park Express)
- Route 138 (Parkland Express)
- Route 158 (Woodlawn Express)
- Route 159 (Colby Express)
- Route 161 (North Preston Express)
- Route 165 (Caldwell Express)
- Route 168 (Cherry Brook Express)
- Route 168 A (Auburn Express)
- Route 168 B (Cherry Brook Express)
- Route 182 (First Lake Express)
- Route 183 (Springfield Express)
- Route 185 (Millwood Express)
- Route 186 (Beaver Bank Express)

== Education ==
Within the South End, there are several levels of education available.

=== Inclusive education ===
The Halifax School for the Blind is administered by the Atlantic Provinces Special Education Authority (APSEA).

- Halifax School for the Blind

=== Private schools ===
- Armbrae Academy
- Halifax Grammar School

=== Public schools ===
With the exception of the Conseil scolaire acadien provincial, all other public schools within the South End are administered by the Halifax Regional Centre for Education.

Conseil scolaire acadien provincial

- École Mer et Monde

Elementary Schools

- Inglis Street Elementary School
- LeMarchant-St. Thomas Elementary School
- Sir Charles Supper Elementary School
- St. Mary's Elementary School

High Schools

- Citadel High School

Junior High Schools

- Gorsebrook Junior High School
- Halifax Central Junior High School

=== Universities ===
- Dalhousie University
- University of King's College
- Saint Mary's University
- Atlantic School of Theology
