= Horsefield =

Horsefield may refer to:

== People ==
- John Horsefield (1792–1854), English handloom weaver and amateur botanist
- Andrew Horsefield (born 1982), American professional wrestler, ring name Andrew Pendelton III
- F. J. Horsefield, author of the book Life in a Cornish Village

== Other uses ==
- Mrs Horsefield, a fictional character in the novel Candyfloss
- Conrose Park or the Horsefield, a park in Canada

== See also ==
- Horsfield (disambiguation)
