= Diana Lennon =

New Zealand academic and pediatrician (1949–2018)

Diana Lennon ONZM
- Born: 3 October 1949
- Died: 15 May 2018 (aged 68)
- Awards: Joan Metge Medal
- Scientific career
- Fields: Paediatric infectious diseases, vaccination
- Institutions: Starship Children's Hospital; University of Auckland; Middlemore Hospital

Diana Rosemary Lennon ONZM (3 October 1949 – 15 May 2018) was a New Zealand academic and paediatrician, specialising in infectious diseases, and was a full professor at the University of Auckland.

== Academic career ==
Lennon graduated with a Bachelor of Medicine, Bachelor of Surgery from the University of Otago in 1972. She was awarded FRACP in paediatrics in 1978.

After a short research position at the University of Auckland, Lennon trained further in infectious diseases at the University of California, Los Angeles. In 1982 she returned to New Zealand as a senior lecturer at the University of Auckland, with a half-time role as a specialist paediatrician at the Auckland Hospital Board.

She was promoted to associate professor in 1991, and professor of population child and youth health in 1996.

Lennon was a specialist in paediatric infectious diseases at Princess Mary Hospital, Starship Hospital and Middlemore Hospital in Auckland, and provided consultant services throughout the country.

== Research ==
Lennon's work on rheumatic fever began in the 1980s with the setting up of a rheumatic fever register for the Auckland region, which was followed by free delivery of a penicillin-based treatment to prevent resurgence. In 2006 Lennon was co-author on New Zealand's first evidence-based diagnostic and treatment guidelines for rheumatic fever. In 2017 Lennon published the results of a world-first trial showing that community interventions (sore-throat clinics in primary schools) could significantly reduce the rate of rheumatic fever in school-children.

Lennon also worked on prevention of other infectious diseases in children. Her work was instrumental in the introduction of vaccine programmes for Haemophilus influenzae type b and meningococcal A and B. Her work showing that the greatest risk factor for meningococcal disease is crowding led directly to changes in how state homes are built.

== Awards ==
In 1992 Lennon was named Plunket Woman of the Year. Lennon was made a Fellow of the Infectious Diseases Society of America in 1994.

In the 2005 New Year Honours, Lennon was appointed an Officer of the New Zealand Order of Merit, for services to science and health. In 2008, the Royal Society Te Apārangi awarded her one of two inaugural Dame Joan Metge Medals for her "research as a paediatrician scientist [that] has made a major impact on the lives of New Zealand children".

In 2017, Lennon was featured in the Royal Society Te Apārangi's 150 women in 150 words project, celebrating the contributions of women to knowledge in New Zealand.

== Selected works ==
- Diana Lennon; Melissa Kerdemelidis; Bruce Arroll (1 July 2009). "Meta-analysis of trials of streptococcal throat treatment programs to prevent rheumatic fever". The Pediatric Infectious Disease Journal. 28 (7): e259-64. doi:10.1097/INF.0B013E3181A8E12A. ISSN 0891-3668. PMID 19561421. Wikidata Q33475557.
- Polly Atatoa-Carr; Diana Lennon; Nigel Wilson; New Zealand Rheumatic Fever Guidelines Writing Group (4 April 2008). "Rheumatic fever diagnosis, management, and secondary prevention: a New Zealand guideline". The New Zealand Medical Journal. 121 (1271): 59–69. ISSN 0028-8446. PMID 18392063. Wikidata Q34590137.
- Rachel Webb; Lesley Voss; Sally Roberts; Tim Hornung; Elizabeth Rumball; Diana Lennon (1 May 2014). "Infective endocarditis in New Zealand children 1994-2012". The Pediatric Infectious Disease Journal. 33 (5): 437–442. doi:10.1097/INF.0000000000000133. ISSN 0891-3668. PMID 24378941. Wikidata Q38174817.
- Wilson N; Baker M; Martin D; et al. (1 October 1995). "Meningococcal disease epidemiology and control in New Zealand". The New Zealand Medical Journal. 108 (1010): 437–442. ISSN 0028-8446. PMID 7478351. Wikidata Q40370128.
- Alison Vogel; Diana Lennon; Emma Best; Alison Leversha (14 October 2016). "Where to from here? The treatment of impetigo in children as resistance to fusidic acid emerges". The New Zealand Medical Journal. 129 (1443): 77–83. ISSN 0028-8446. PMID 27736855. Wikidata Q40508160.
- Baker MG; Martin DR; Kieft CE; Lennon D (1 October 2001). "A 10-year serogroup B meningococcal disease epidemic in New Zealand: descriptive epidemiology, 1991-2000". Journal of Paediatrics and Child Health. 37 (5): S13-9. doi:10.1046/J.1440-1754.2001.00722.X. ISSN 1034-4810. PMID 11885731. Wikidata Q40654789.
