= Gorsebrook Park =

Park in Halifax, Nova Scotia, Canada

Coordinates: 44°38′04″N 63°34′56″W

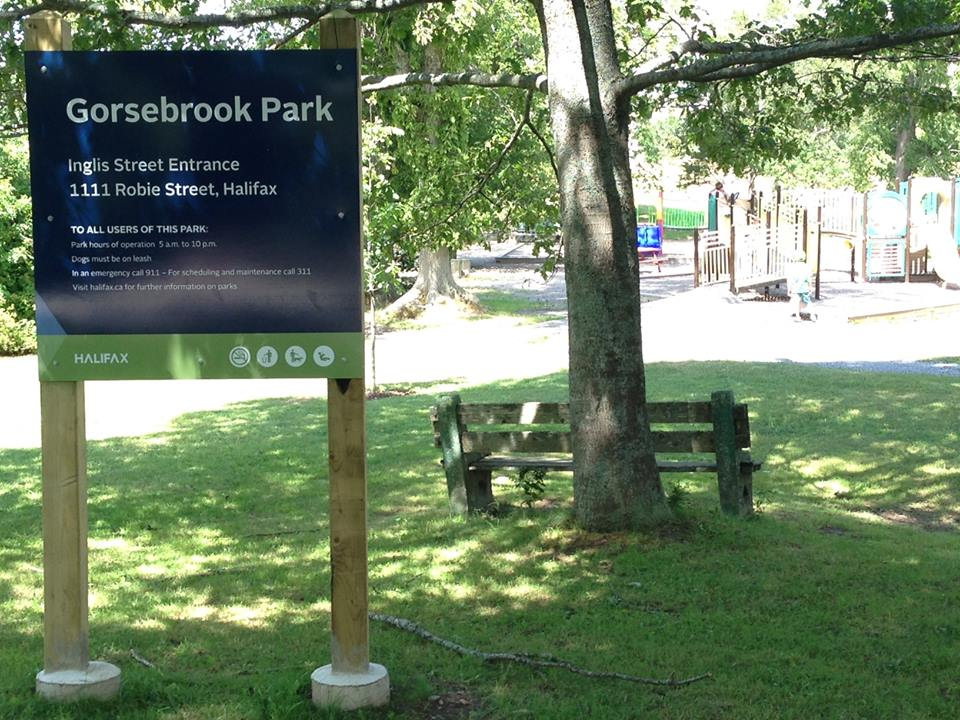
- Entrance to Gorsebrook Park from Inglis Street
- Interactive map of Gorsebrook Park
- Type: Public park
- Location: Halifax, Nova Scotia
- Area: 19 acres (7.7 ha)
- Created: 1940s
- Operator: Halifax Regional Municipality
- Open: Year round
- Public transit: Halifax Transit

Gorsebrook Park is a 19-acre Canadian urban park located in the South End of Halifax, Nova Scotia.

== History ==
In the 1800s the South End of Halifax began to be settled with large estates and land grants. One of those was the estate of John Tremaine, which was bought by Enos Collins in the 1824 and renamed Gorsebrook. "Gorsebrook" extended from Robie Street on the west, South Street on the north, Gorsebrook Avenue on the south and Wellington Street and Tower Road on the east. Today’s Gorsebrook Park was the hay field of the property, with the Collins house located on Tower Road near the current location of the Homburg Centre at Saint Mary's University. While SMU has a plaque noting the location, the house was torn down in the 1960s and this was the incident that spurred the founding of the Heritage Trust of Nova Scotia.

In 1894 the estate was split. By 1900 the northern portion was rented to the Gorsebrook Golf Club, who operated a 9-hole course. When Ashburn Golf Club opened in 1922 Gorsebrook became a community golf course. In 1928, course expanded to southern section and 18 holes. No trees were to be cut. In 1941, Cartaret Collins, a descendant of Enos Collins, died and the sell-off began. Late in WWII, the Royal Canadian Air Force purchased and built RCAF Base Gorsebrook northeast portion, and by 1953 it expanded to become full air force residence. In the late 1940s, Halifax city bought the remaining north lands and divided it into baseball diamonds.

Gorsebrook Junior High School was built on the north west of what is now Gorsebrook Park in 1949, and St Francis School, now called Inglis Street Elementary School, was built on the south west in 1952. In 1983, Sir Frederick Fraser School, operated by Atlantic Provinces Special Education Authority (APSEA), began operation at the site.

== Facilities ==
The park is intensively used for many different sports and recreation activities:

- 2 softball/baseball diamonds (Gorsebrook and St Francis ballfields)
- 1 Class A soccer pitch (Gorsebrook Field)
- 3 tennis courts
- 1 outdoor basketball court
- 1 lacrosse rink
- 1 fully accessible playground
- 1 non-functional splash pool
- a 42 plot community garden
- tobogganing and skiing in the winter

The adjacent school's gyms are both used year-round as municipal recreation facilities.
