= 2005 New Year Honours (New Zealand) =

Annual awards for New Zealanders

- Previous: 2004 Queen's Birthday Honours; Next: 2005 New Zealand bravery awards
- Type: New Zealand royal honours: Order of New Zealand; New Zealand Order of Merit; Queen's Service Order; Queen's Service Medal; New Zealand Gallantry Decoration; New Zealand Gallantry Medal; New Zealand Bravery Medal
- Date: 31 December 2004
- Country: New Zealand
- Total recipients: 200

The 2005 New Year Honours in New Zealand were appointments by Elizabeth II in her right as Queen of New Zealand, on the advice of the New Zealand government, to various orders and honours to reward and highlight good works by New Zealanders, and to celebrate the passing of 2004 and the beginning of 2005. They were announced on 31 December 2004, and included gallantry awards for actions in East Timor.

The recipients of honours are listed here as they were styled before their new honour.

== Order of New Zealand (ONZ) ==
Ordinary member

- The Right Honourable Jonathan Lucas Hunt MP – of Waitakere City; Speaker of the House of Representatives. For services to Parliament.
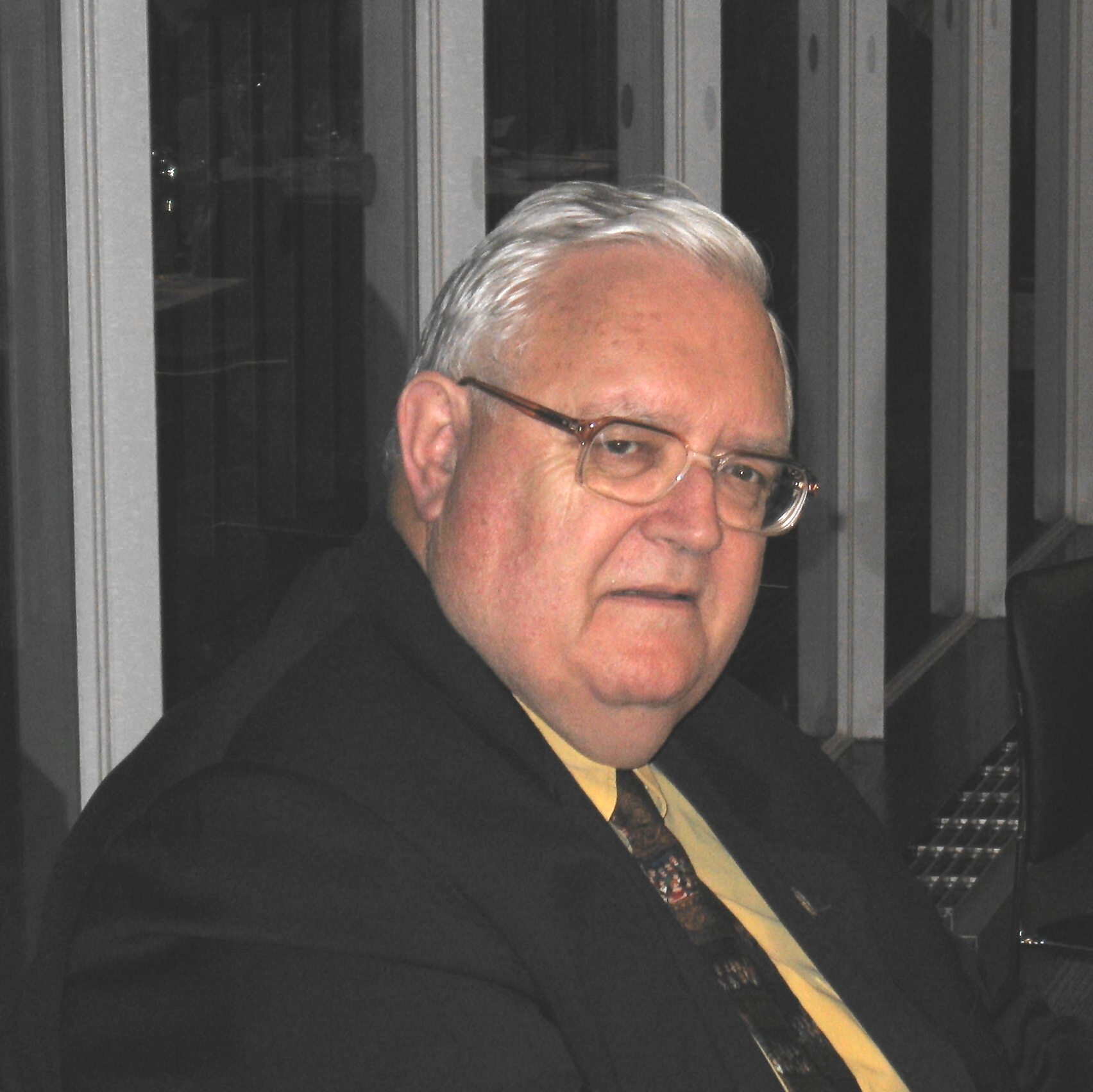
Jonathan Hunt

== New Zealand Order of Merit ==
=== Distinguished Companion (DCNZM) ===
- Professor Donald Ward Beaven CBE – of Christchurch. For services to persons with diabetes.
- The Right Honourable Peter Blanchard – of Auckland. For services to the judiciary.
- Dr Mary Josephine (Joy) Drayton CNZM MBE – of Tauranga. For services to education and local-body affairs.
- Dr Alan Russell Frampton – of Auckland. For services to agriculture.
- Tumu Te Heuheu – of Taupō. For services to conservation.
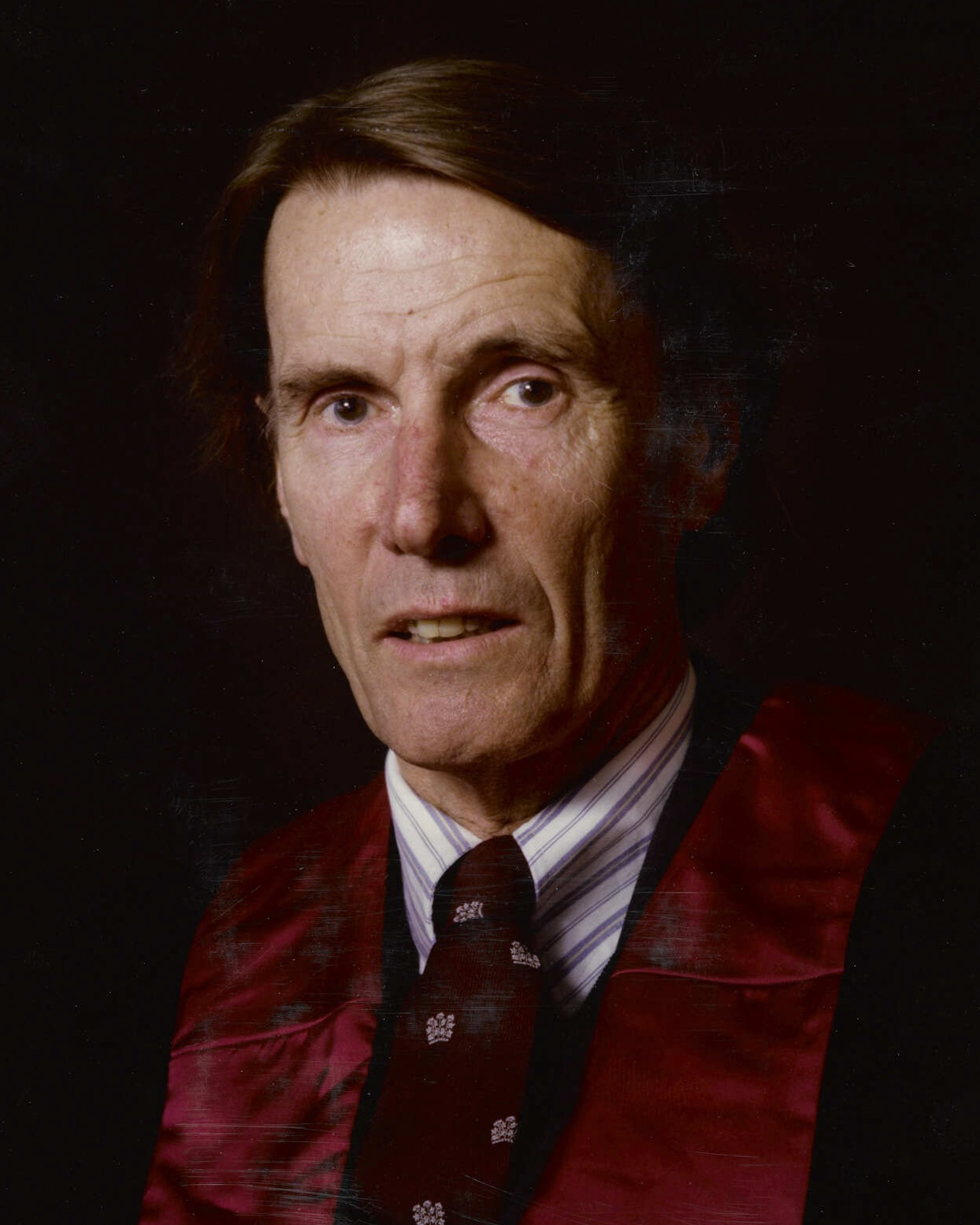
Don Beaven

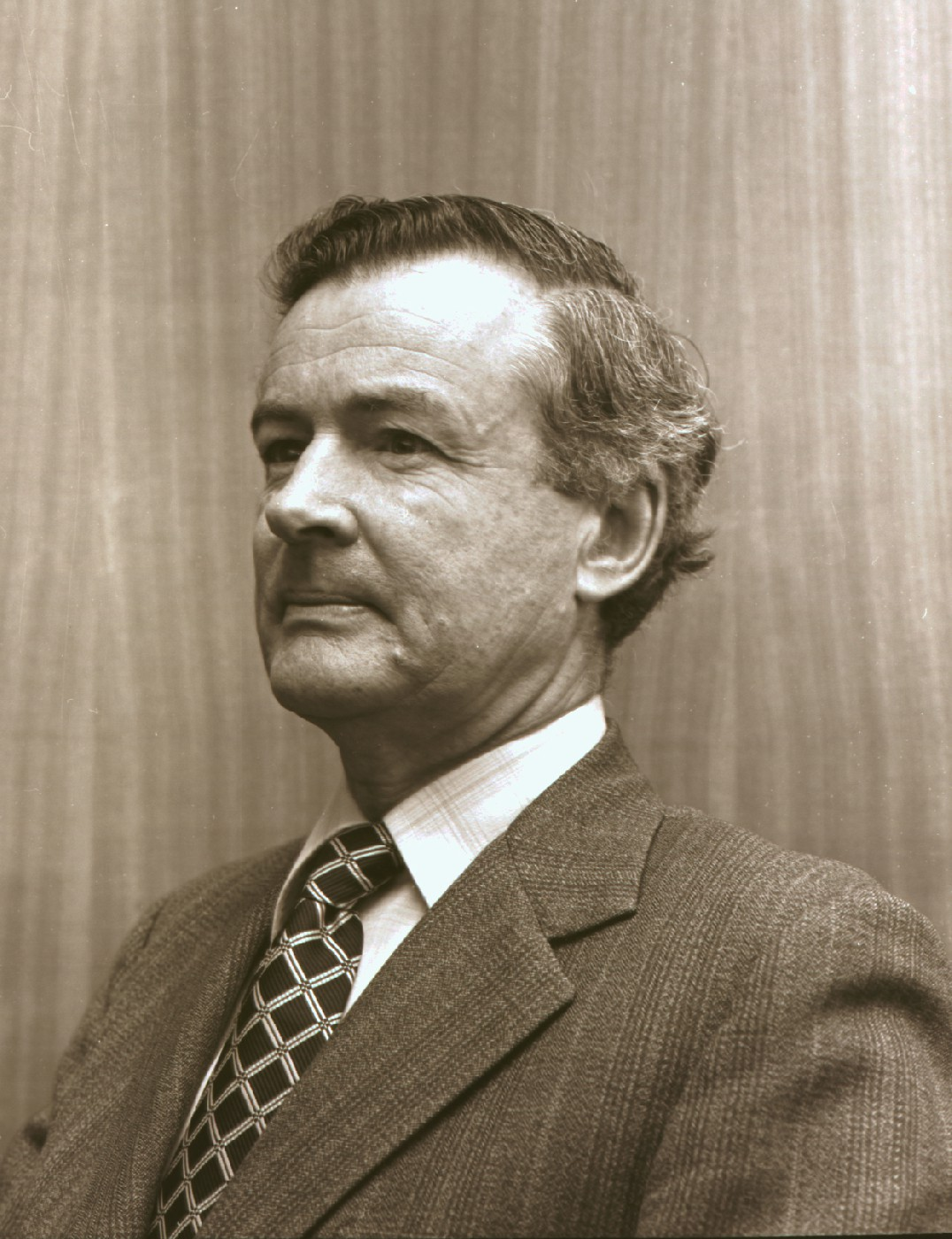
Alan Frampton

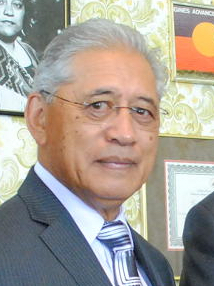
Tumu Te Heuheu

=== Companion (CNZM) ===
- Arthur Wynyard Beasley OBE ED – of Wellington. For services to orthopaedics and the community.
- Professor Dick Bellamy – of Auckland. For services to science and education.
- Margaret Anne Bendall – of Auckland. For services to education.
- Gwendoline Joyce Bull JP – of Papakura. For services to local government.
- Professor Wystan Tremayne Le Cren Curnow – of Auckland. For services to art and literature.
- James Kempster Guthrie – of Dunedin. For services to environmental law, conservation and the community.
- Dr Bryan Foss Leach – of Picton. For services to archaeology.
- Christopher Robert Mace – of Auckland. For services to the Antarctic and the community.
- Alexia Helen Pickering QSO JP – of Wellington. For services to persons with disabilities.
- Michael Charles Wintringham – of Waikanae. For public services as State Services Commissioner.
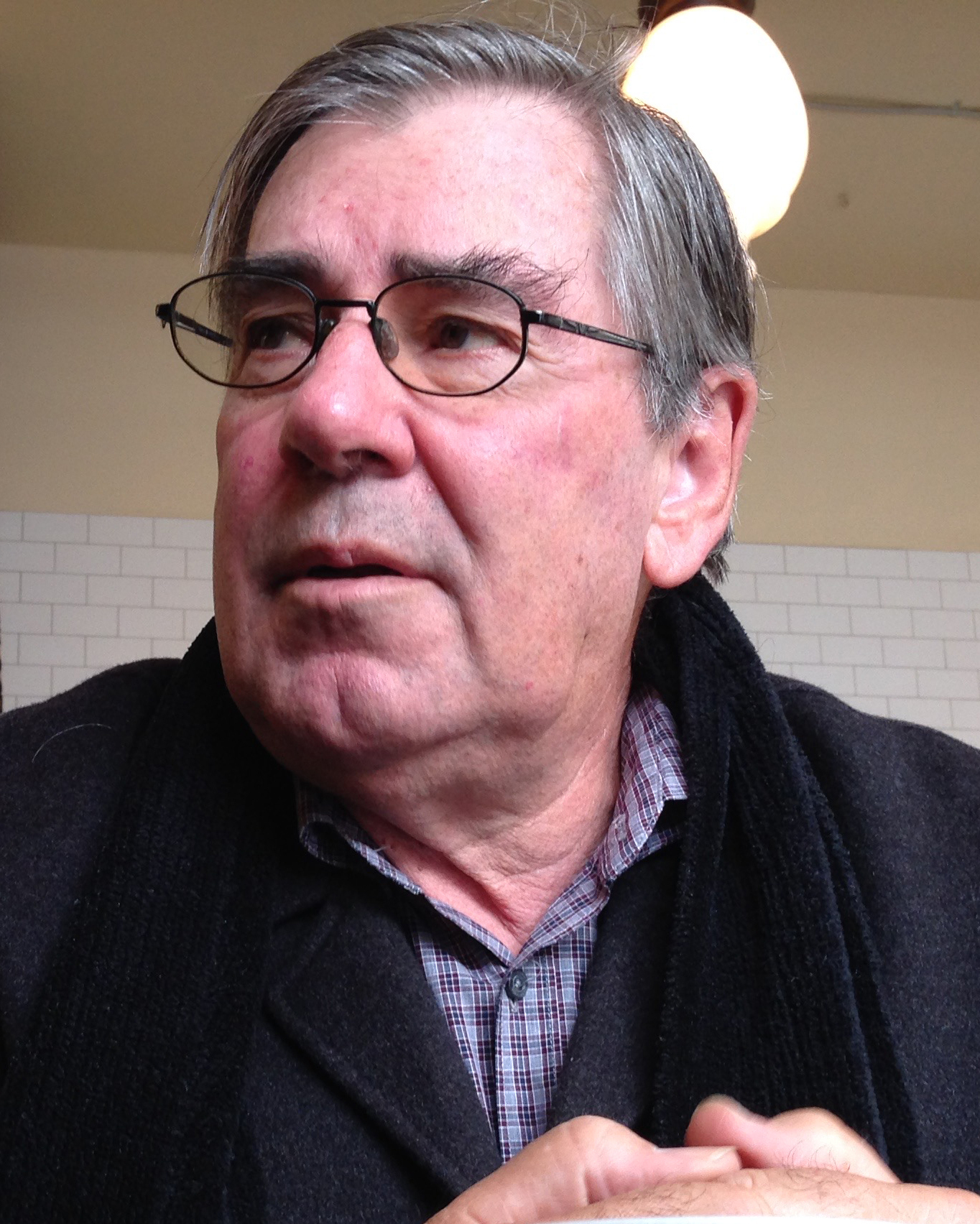
Wystan Curnow

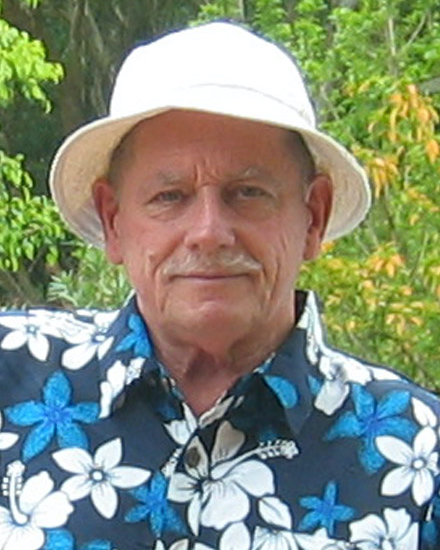
Foss Leach

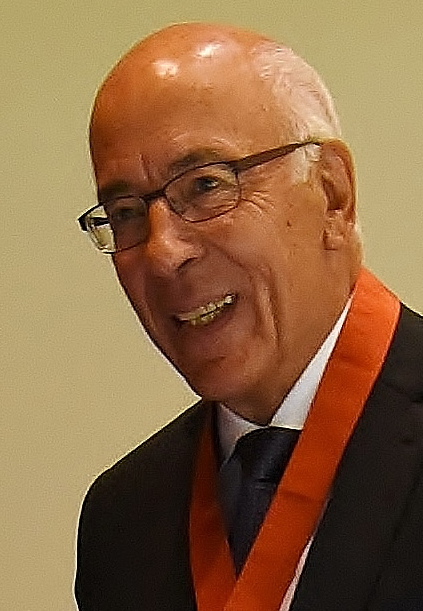
Chris Mace

=== Officer (ONZM) ===
- Billy Apple – of Auckland. For services to art.
- Alistair Te Ariki Campbell – of Wellington. For services to literature.
- Hamish Carter – of Auckland. For services to sport especially as a triathlete.
- Philip Maurice Carter JP – of Christchurch. For services to business.
- Vernon Raymond Clark – of Canterbury. For services to agriculture and the community.
- Professor Kathryn Elizabeth Crosier – of Auckland. For services to medicine.
- Caroline Frances Evers-Swindell – of Cambridge. For services to rowing.
- Georgina Emma Buchanan Evers-Swindell – of Cambridge. For services to rowing.
- Professor Emeritus Leon Frank Garner – of North Shore City. For services to optometry.
- Dr Arthur Henry Hackett – of Mount Maunganui. For public services.
- Dr Patricia Harris – of Palmerston North. For services to science.
- Associate Professor Jack Hilton Havill – of Hamilton. For services to medicine and medical research.
- Dennis Ashley Hills JP – of Christchurch. For services to science and industry.
- Raymond Stuart Labone – of Wellington. For services to the design industry.
- Professor Diana Rosemary Lennon – of Auckland. For services to science and health.
- Gary Patrick Lennon – of Christchurch. For services to education, sport and the community.
- Murray John McNae – of Porirua. For services to industry development.
- Joseph Patrick Moodabe – of Auckland. For services to the film industry and the community.
- Margaret Alison Nielsen – of Wellington. For services to music.
- Robin David Marks Owen JP – of South Canterbury. For services to local body and community affairs.
- Ioannis John Psathas – of Wellington. For services to music.
- John Stewart Robson – of Palmerston North. For services to local government and the building industry.
- Thomas Trevor Ryder JP – of New Plymouth. For services to education and the community.
- Frederick Martyn Brocas Sanderson – of Ōtaki. For services to literature and the theatre.
- Emeritus Professor Michael John Selby – of Hamilton. For services to education.
- Anne Rosemarie Todd-Lambie – of Nelson. For services to women.
- Sarah Elizabeth Ulmer – of Cambridge. For services to cycling.
- John Douglas Voss – of Tauranga. For services to the kiwifruit industry.
- Michael Heseltine Watt – of Pulborough, England. For services to the community.
- Walter Glenn Whittaker – of Tauranga. For services to the dairy industry.

Additional

- Lieutenant Colonel Anthony Bryan Howie – Royal New Zealand Infantry Regiment.
- Group Captain Gavin John Howse – Royal New Zealand Air Force.
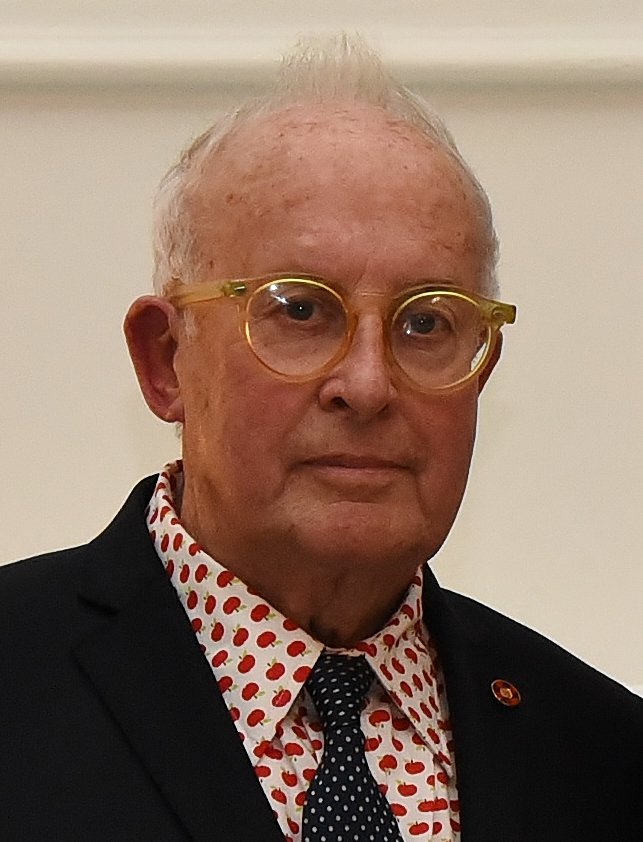
Billy Apple

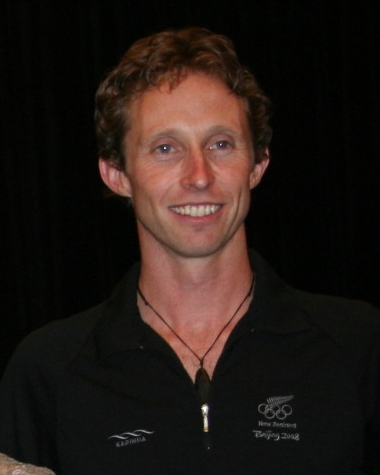
Hamish Carter

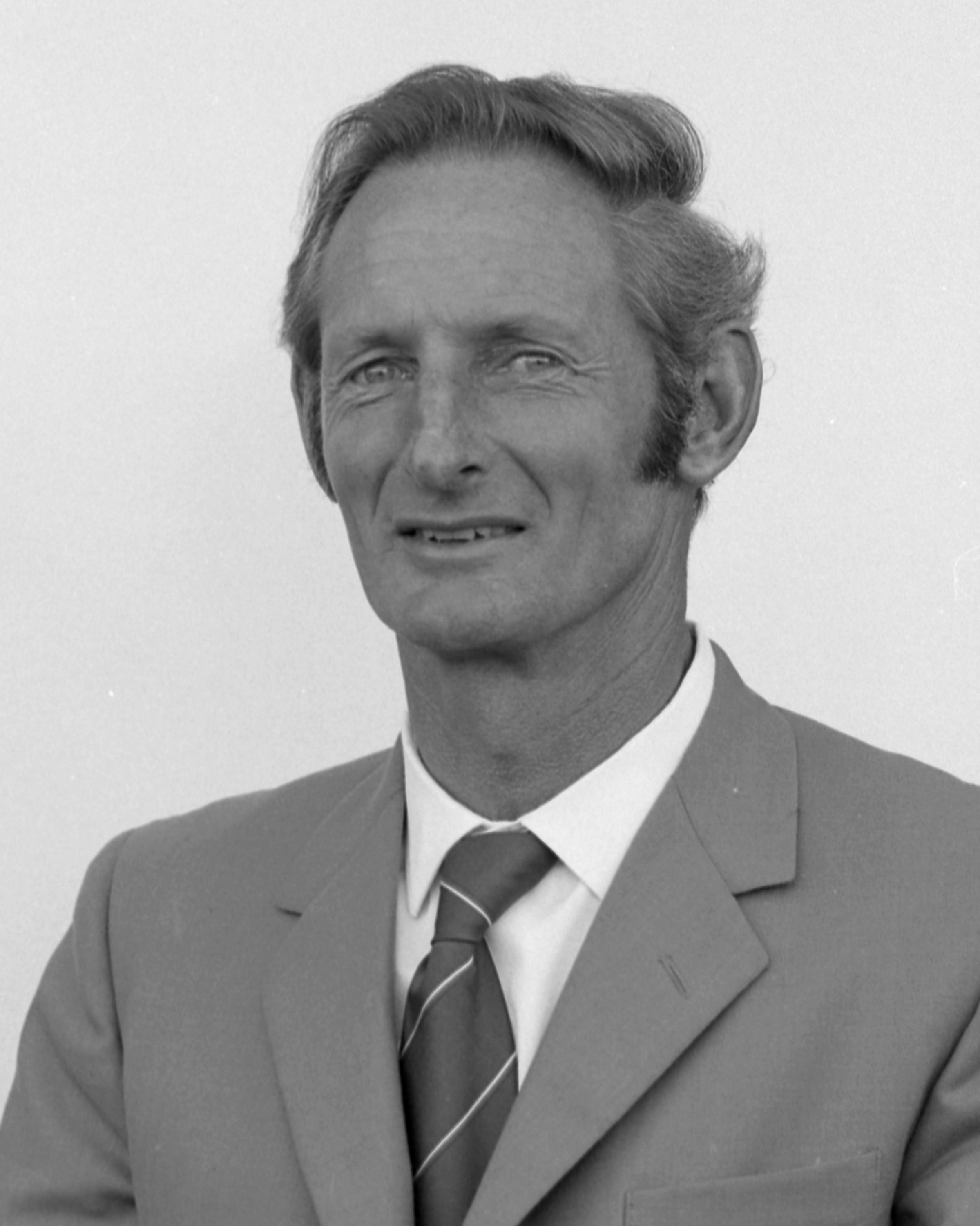
Vern Clark

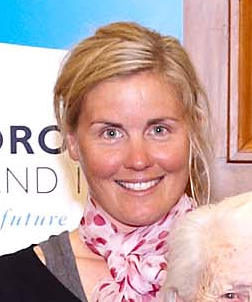
Caroline Evers-Swindell

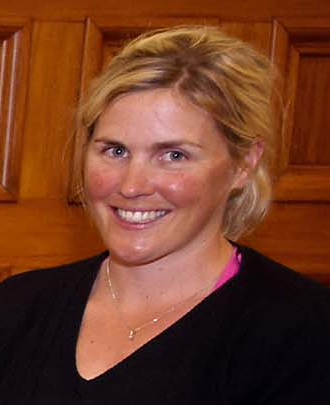
Georgina Evers-Swindell

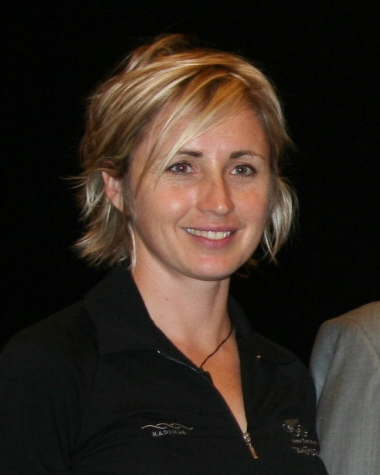
Sarah Ulmer

=== Member (MNZM) ===
- Raymond Henry (Sandy) Adsett JP – of Hastings. For services to art.
- Pamela Kay Allen – of Auckland. For services to children's literature.
- Ronald Murray Anderson – of Ashburton. For services to local government.
- Togimanu Inglis (Tony) Annandale – of Suva, Fiji; superintendent, New Zealand Police. For services to the New Zealand Police.
- Barbara Arnold – of Palmerston North. For services to the environment.
- Allan Roy Bean – of Christchurch. For services to spinal injuries medicine and rehabilitation.
- Trevor Thomas Bland AFC – of Manukau City. For services to aviation.
- Maurice Patrick Boland – of North Shore City. For services to the community.
- Dr David William Brook – of Auckland. For services to tertiary education.
- Richard Harold Cathie – of Wellington. For services to the arts.
- Helen Margaret Clarke – of Auckland. For services to hockey.
- Esther Tumama Cowley-Malcolm – of Auckland. For services to Pacific Island families.
- Margaret Currie – of Ulanbaatar, Mongolia. For services to welfare work in Mongolian prisons.
- Paul Hugh Dibble – of Palmerston North. For services to the arts.
- Bevan Docherty – of Auckland. For services to sport, especially as a triathlete.
- Iris Marie Donoghue – of Auckland. For services to the environment.
- Avril Enslow – of Christchurch. For services to gymnastics.
- Ben Fouhy – of Taumarunui. For services to kayaking.
- Wing Commander Stephen James Goodman – Royal New Zealand Air Force.
- Squadron Leader Michael Glen Graham – Royal New Zealand Air Force.
- Dr Gillian Brooker Greer – of Wellington. For services to family planning and literature.
- David Ian Haigh JP – of Auckland. For services to the community.
- William John Henderson – of Dunedin. For services to cricket and the community.
- Roger John Horrocks – of Auckland. For services to the film and television industries.
- Judith Heather Howat – of Wellington. For services to lawn bowls.
- Rodney Edward (Nuki) Johnson – of Taupō. For services to boxing.
- Robert James Kerridge JP – of Auckland. For services to animal welfare.
- Chris Kirk-Burnnand – of Porirua. For services to the community.
- Donald (Kee Chong) Kwok JP – of Hamilton. For services to the Chinese community.
- Lois Edith Ellen Lawn – of Dunedin. For services to speech therapy and the community.
- Jennifer Kay Ludlam – of Christchurch. For services to the theatre.
- Peter Raymon Martin – of Hamilton. For services to paralympic sport.
- Helen Wilmot Mason – of Central Hawke's Bay. For services to pottery.
- Neville Bradbury Matthews – of Washington D.C., United States of America; superintendent, New Zealand Police. For services to the New Zealand Police.
- Dr Richard James Meech – of Napier. For services to public health.
- Selwyn James Metcalfe JP – of South Taranaki. For services to sport and the community.
- Elizabeth Anne (Liz) Mitchell – of Auckland. For services to the fashion industry.
- Squadron Leader Ian James Mower – Royal New Zealand Air Force.
- Brendon John Moynihan – of Auckland. For public services.
- Reon Edward Murtha – of Christchurch. For services to broadcasting.
- Major Paul Edward Napier BEM – Royal New Zealand Armoured Corps.
- Archdeacon Emeritus The Venerable Reginald John Nicholson – of Hamilton. For services to the community.
- Oswald John Perry – of Kaitaia. For services to the community.
- Maurice Henry Pulman – of Hamilton. For services to speedway racing.
- John Frederick Read JP – of Martinborough. For services to the community.
- Neil Holmes Reid – of Auckland. For services to surf lifesaving.
- Tracey Leigh Richardson – of Napier. For services to persons with cystic fibrosis.
- Thomas Frederick Robinson JP – of Foxton. For services to local government.
- Francis Donald McKechnie Stevenson (Frankie Stevens) – of Upper Hutt. For services to entertainment.
- Judi Ann Strid – of Auckland. For services to women's health.
- David Ti Tai – of Lower Hutt. For services to the Chinese community.
- Eric Selwyn Tait – of Ōtorohanga. For services to local government.
- Christina Atoa Tapu JP – of Manukau City. For services to the Pacific Island community.
- Jean Corbin Thomas JP – of Palmerston North. For services to the community.
- Te Reowhakakotahi Charles Wall – of Taupō. For services to rugby and the community.
- Peter Owen Wyatt – of Tauranga. For services to the community.

Additional

- Lieutenant Keri Maree Anderson – The Corps of Royal New Zealand Engineers.
- Major William Thomas Blaikie – New Zealand Intelligence Corps.
- Acting Warrant Officer Communications Analyst Denise Jones – Royal New Zealand Navy.
- Staff Sergeant Darrin James Waitere – The Corps of Royal New Zealand Engineers.
- Corporal James Mark Whitworth – The Corps of Royal New Zealand Engineers (Territorial Force).
- Sapper Luke James Wilson – The Corps of Royal New Zealand Engineers.
- Lieutenant Commander Karl Edwin Woodhead – Royal New Zealand Navy.
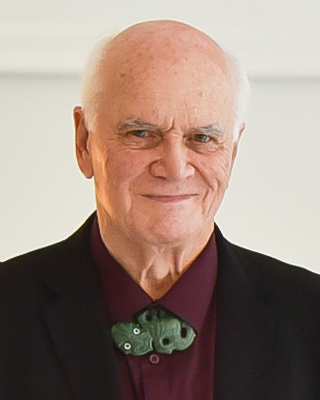
Sandy Adsett

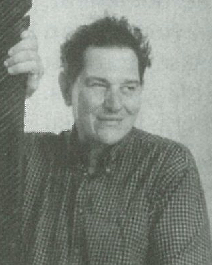
Paul Dibble

== Companion of the Queen's Service Order (QSO) ==
=== For community service ===
- James Grenville Geddes – of Gore.
- Matire Glover – of Gisborne.
- Margaret Alexandria Huinga Kaua JP – of Gisborne.
- William Stanley Penno – of South Canterbury.
- Ellen Ann Ramsay – of Otago.
- Barbara Stewart – of Christchurch.

=== For public services ===
- Peter Robert Bennett – of Trevignano Romano, Italy.
- Alistair David Betts – of Canterbury. (Note: Deceased. Her Majesty's approval of this appointment took effect prior to the date of decease.)
- Gordon Joseph Blake MNZM JP – of Tīrau.
- Neil John Clarke OBE JP – of Mount Maunganui.
- Alan John Dick – of Napier.
- The Honourable Roger Neville McClay – of Wellington.
- Gerald Reginald McGhie – of Wellington.
- Gary Vernon Taylor JP – of Waitakere City.

== Queen's Service Medal (QSM) ==
=== For community service ===
- Hanakalala Ahotaha – of Auckland.
- Zelda Mae Bridgens – of North Shore City.
- Brian Ernest Clark – of New Plymouth.
- Lorna Violet Clauson JP – of Auckland.
- Neville Thomas Creighton – of Auckland.
- Susan Davison – of Auckland.
- Phillip James Denton – of Invercargill.
- James Ian Dunsmore – of Gisborne.
- Onawe Joan Finlayson JP – of North Shore City.
- Bethea Eve Frost – of Northland.
- Inna Grbich – of Wellington.
- Trevor Wiremu Griffiths JP – of Timaru.
- Dr Francis Neil Hayes – of Carterton.
- Gloria Margaret Hunt – of Nelson.
- Parehuia Whaanga Irwin – of Hawke's Bay.
- Ian Stanley Jenkins – of Morrinsville.
- Dr Ranatunga Ariyadasa Kalupahana – of Lower Hutt.
- Beverley Joy Kay – of Te Awamutu.
- Alan Grant Kerr – of New Plymouth.
- Huhana Barbara Kissock – of Gisborne.
- Valda Joy Benner Laurich – of Hauraki Plains.
- The Reverend Alan John Leadley – of Hamilton.
- Kai-Shek Luey – of Auckland.
- Helen Maclean – of Wanganui.
- Elizabeth Ann Malo – of Waitakere City.
- Matakite Rangi Malo – of Waitakere City.
- John Stuart (Boggy) McDowell – of Invercargill.
- Peter Miles – of North Canterbury.
- Brian John Mills – of Nelson.
- George Edwin Allanby Nikolaison – of Masterton.
- Bhukhan Lal Parbhu JP – of Wellington.
- John (Lindon) Rayner – of Dunedin.
- Hilda Betty Ashton Rhodes King – of Christchurch.
- Thelma Joy Ruohonen – of Taupō.
- Robert James Scott – of Rotorua.
- Joan Millicent Sherley – of Raumati Beach.
- Adrienne Helen Spark JP – of Rangiora.
- Pani Takawhenua Stirling – of Manukau City.
- Te Kepa Takataka-o-Rangi Stirling – of Manukau City.
- John William Ward – of Palmerston North.
- Bevan Peter Wealleans JP – of Reefton.
- Murray William Willis – of Great Barrier Island.
- Kyung Sook Wilson – of North Shore City.
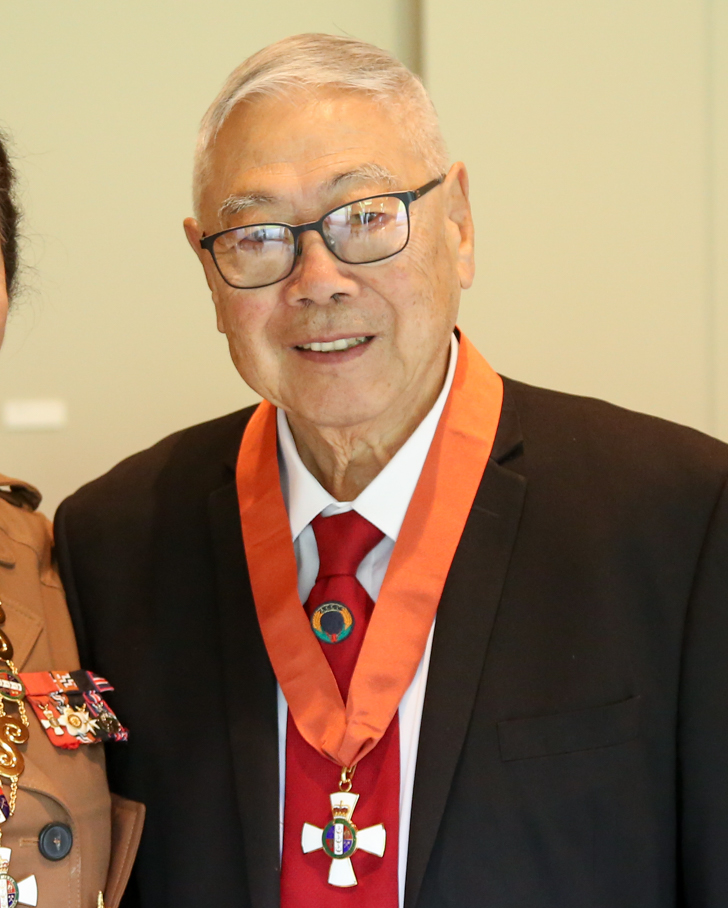
Kai Luey

=== For public services ===
- Te Akapikirangi (Aka) Arthur – of Porirua.
- Kenneth Victor Catt – of Waitakere City.
- Roy Herbert Connolly – of Nelson.
- Norma Sarah Joan Dobson – of Whangārei.
- Ian Alexander Edward – of Rotorua.
- Daryl Raymond Forrest – of Balclutha; senior firefighter, Balclutha Volunteer Fire Brigade, New Zealand Fire Service.
- Beverley Rose Harris JP – of Waitakere City.
- Herbert George Harrison – of Timaru.
- Raynor Lawrence Henson – of Picton; senior firefighter, Picton Volunteer Fire Brigade, New Zealand Fire Service.
- Janet Mary Hope – of Orewa; inspector, New Zealand Police.
- Trevor John Humphrey – of Wanganui.
- Robert (Bob) Langholm – of Auckland.
- Harihari Lizzie Matenga – of Whangārei.
- Pona Wiremu Matenga – of Whangārei.
- William (John) McCullough – of Central Hawke's Bay; lately chief fire officer, Waipawa Volunteer Fire Brigade, New Zealand Fire Service.
- Alan John McEnaney – of Greymouth.
- Anita Leslie Moore JP – of Kawerau.
- Murray Grant Edward Morrissey – of Auckland; senior Sergeant, New Zealand Police.
- Annelise Ivy Vani Nygaard – of Papakura; constable, New Zealand Police.
- Michael Joseph O'Connor – of Palmerston North.
- Charles Leonard Parker JP – of Auckland.
- Margaret Peace – of Blenheim.
- Nancye (Pamela) Reader – of Wellington.
- William Hukere (Tosh) Ruwhiu – of North Canterbury.
- Leo Joseph Tooman – of Hamilton; inspector, New Zealand Police.
- Robert Bruce Twaddle JP – of Napier.
- Edward James Vallely – of Wanganui.
- Margaret (Helen) Walch – of Ōtaki.
- John Murray Ward – of Nelson; rural fire mediator, New Zealand Fire Service.
- John Whitty – of Wellington.
- William Rore Wiki – of Manukau City.
Murray Morrissey

== New Zealand Gallantry Decoration (NZGD) ==
- Private (now Trooper) Phillip Murray Cheater – Royal New Zealand Infantry Regiment. For actions in East Timor.

== New Zealand Gallantry Medal (NZGM) ==
- Corporal Gerald Stewart Fenton – Royal New Zealand Infantry Regiment. For actions in East Timor.

== New Zealand Bravery Medal (NZBM) ==
- Sergeant Ngametua Tetava – Royal New Zealand Infantry Regiment. For actions in East Timor.
