= Alan Frampton =

New Zealand agricultural economist (1929–2026)

Sir Alan Frampton KNZM
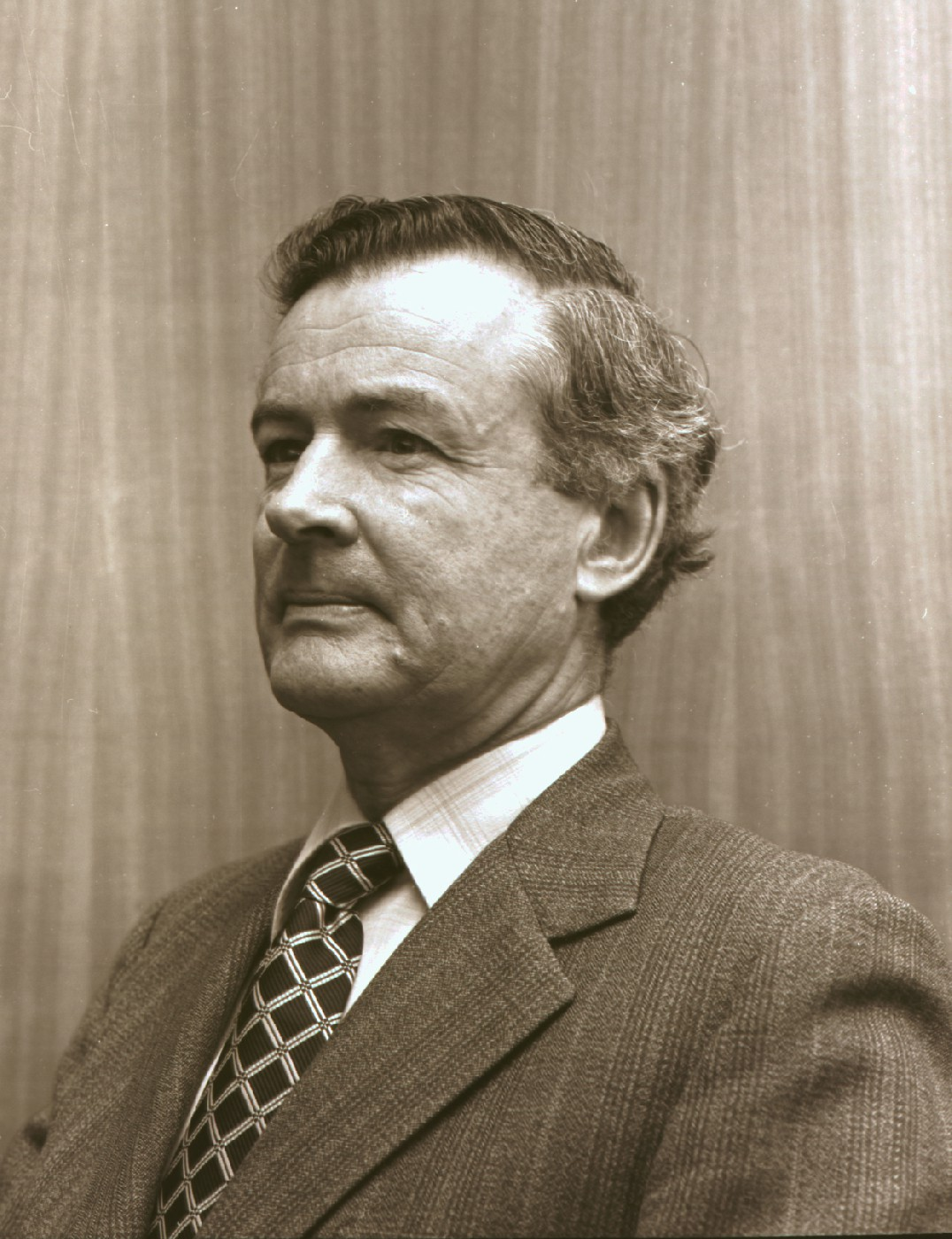
- Frampton in 1977
- Born: Alan Russell Frampton; 2 November 1929; Morrinsville, New Zealand
- Died: 10 April 2026 (aged 96); Auckland, New Zealand

Academic background
- Education: Massey College (MAgrSc)
- Alma mater: Cornell University
- Thesis: Internal and external implications of changes in United States imports of milkfat (1968)

Academic work
- Discipline: Agricultural science
- Sub-discipline: Agricultural economics
- Institutions: Massey University

Sir Alan Russell Frampton KNZM (2 November 1929 – 10 April 2026) was a New Zealand agricultural economist. He completed a master's degree at Massey University in 1964. He had a career as an academic at Massey University from 1968 to 1983, before working as a consultant. He was a member of the New Zealand Dairy Board from 1973 to 1993, and was chair of the Tatua Dairy Company from 1990 to 2003.

In 1990, Frampton was awarded the New Zealand 1990 Commemoration Medal. In the 2005 New Year Honours, Frampton was appointed a Distinguished Companion of the New Zealand Order of Merit, for services to agriculture. Following the restoration of titular honours by the New Zealand government in 2009, he accepted redesignation as a Knight Companion of the New Zealand Order of Merit.

Frampton was conferred with an honorary Doctor of Science degree by Massey University in 2002, and in 2010 he received a distinguished alumnus award from the same institution.

Frampton died at a retirement village in the Auckland suburb of Glendowie, on 10 April 2026, at the age of 96.
