= Valerie Thornton =

British artist (1931–1991)

- Born: 1931; London, England
- Died: 1991 (aged 59–60); Chelsworth, England
- Known for: Printmaking
- Partner: Michael Chase

Valerie Thornton (1931–1991) was a British etcher and printmaker.

== Biography ==
Thornton was born in London, but evacuated to Canada with her two brothers during World War II. She returned to London in 1944 and went on to study at the Byam Shaw School of Art in 1949. From 1950 to 1953 Thornton studied under P.F. Millard at the Regent Street Polytechnic, then spent eight months at Atelier 17 in Paris. In the early 1960s she moved to New York and worked at Pratt Graphic Art Center. In 1955, she succeeded Howard Hodgkin as assistant art teacher at Charterhouse School and in 1965 she became a founding member of the Print Makers Council. In 1970 she became a Fellow of the Royal Society of Painters-Etchers and Engravers.

Thornton's work is included in a number of major public collections including the Victoria and Albert Museum, the British Museum, the Tate and others. Thornton died in 1991 in Chelsworth, Suffolk.

Thornton was a member of The Regent Street Group – a group of nine artists who studied together at the Regent Street Polytechnic in the early 1950s. The group also included Susan Horsfield, Renate Meyer, Michael Lewis, Ken Symonds, Philip Le Bas and Peter Riches.
