= Hossfeld =

Hossfeld is a surname, a variant of the German habitational surname Hosfeld. Notable people with the surname include:

- Chuck Hossfeld (born 1977), American race car driver and team owner
- Hilmar Hoßfeld (born 1954), German athlete

== See also ==
- Hosfeld
