= Susan Horsfield =

British artist (1928–2024)

Susan Horsfield (Platts)
- Born: Susan Horsfield; 10 December 1928; India
- Died: 17 November 2024 (aged 95); Provence, Var.
- Education: Regent Street Polytechnic
- Known for: Painting and watercolour
- Style: Figurative painting
- Movement: Regent Street Group

Susan Margaret Horsfield, later Susan Platts (born 1928, died 2024) is a British painter and former art teacher who works in a variety of media.

== Biography ==
Horsfield was born in India in 1928 and graduated in Fine Art from the School of Art at Regent Street Polytechnic in central London in 1952 where she was taught by Patrick Millard and Norman Blamey. She has travelled extensively in Africa where she worked as an interior designer and taught in a government school.

She married Mr Shelley Platts in August 1952 at Felpham, near Bognor Regis and has four children. She was head of the art department at Farrington's School Chislehurst, London from 1969 to 1986, also lecturing in further education and at field study centres.

Horsfield had her first solo exhibition at the Walker Galleries in London in 1956, going on to exhibit with the London Group, the Royal Society of British Artists and the Royal Watercolour Society. Horsfield was a member of the Women's International Art Club from 1957 to 1969, serving on their executive, selection and hanging committees in the early 1960s. She was a member of The Regent Street Group - a group of nine artists who studied together at the Regent Street Polytechnic in the early 1950s. The group also included Valerie Thornton, Renate Meyer, Michael Lewis, Ken Symonds, Philip Le Bas and Peter Riches.

== Solo exhibitions ==
- 1956 – Walker Galleries, London
- 1968 – Mansard Art Gallery, London
- 2003 – Old Fire Engine House, Ely, Cambridgeshire

== Group exhibitions ==
- 1957 – Royal Institute, Royal Institute Galleries, London
- 1957 – Women's International Art Club, Whitechapel Gallery, London
- 1959 – Walker Galleries, London (with Valerie Thornton, Thelma Carstensen, Edwin Mortlock and Anthony Day)
- 1959 – Association of Sussex Artists, Horsham Town Hall, Sussex
- 1960 & 1961 – Women's International Art Club, RBA Galleries, London
- 1962 – Bear Lane Gallery, Oxford (with Sannie Drew and Valerie Thornton)
- 1969 – Women's International Art Club, Morley College Gallery, London

== Galleries ==
- Nuffield Foundation
- Kings College, Cambridge
