= John Postlethwait =

American biologist

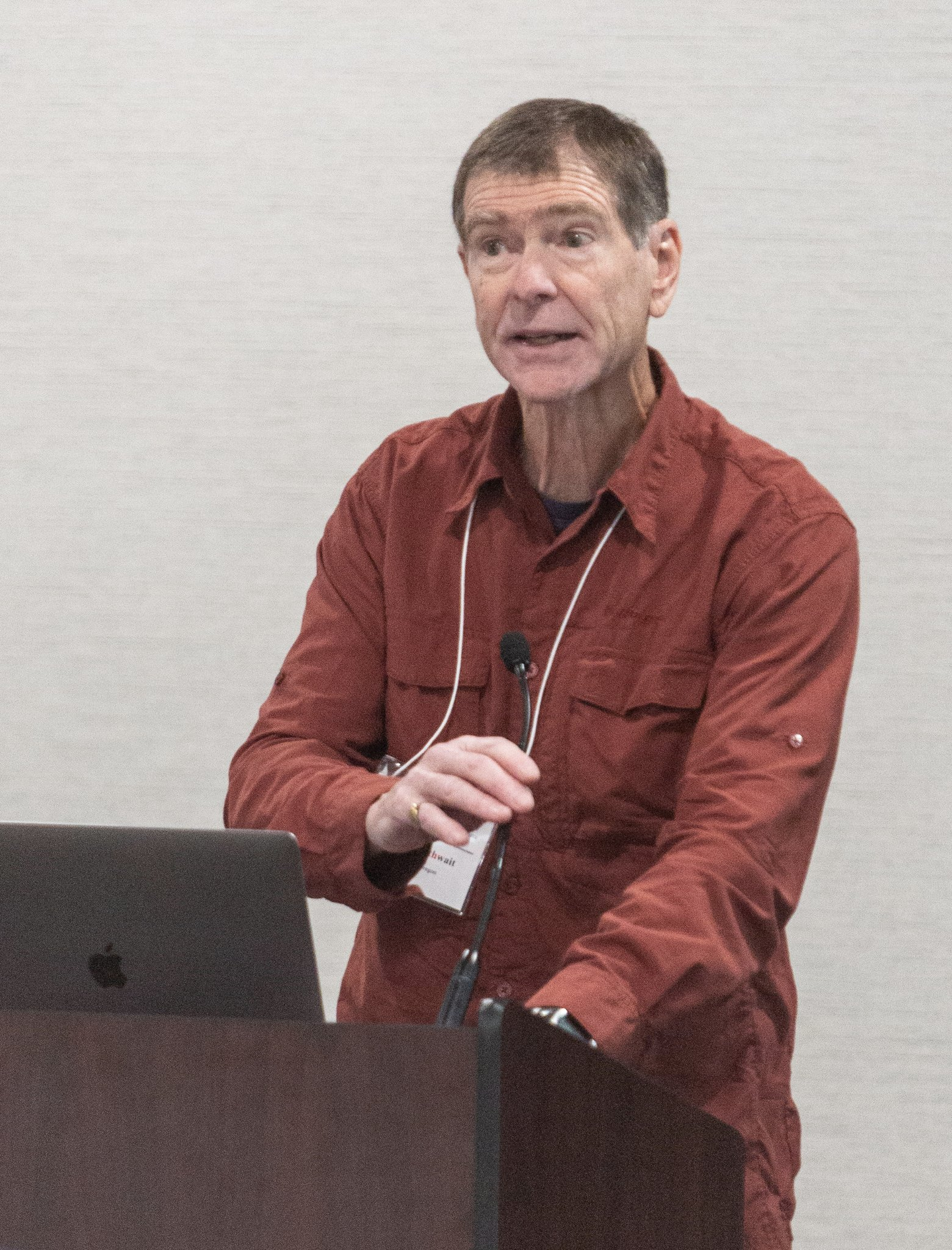
- Postlethwait at the 2018 NIH Comparative Medicine Resource Director's Meeting
- Awards: George W. Beadle Award (2015)

Academic background
- Education: Purdue University BS; Case Western Reserve University PhD

John H. Postlethwait is a professor of biology and author at University of Oregon.

== Education ==
In 1966, Postlethwait graduated from Purdue University with a bachelor's degree in biology and was inducted into Phi Beta Kappa. He completed predoctoral work in development genetics at University of California, Irvine in 1970. At Case Western Reserve University, Postlethwait earned a doctorate in developmental genetics before completing postdoctoral research in molecular genetics at Harvard University.

== Career ==
Postlethwait is internationally recognized for his pioneering work on molecular genetics using zebrafish (Danio rerio) as a model organism.

== Awards ==
Postlethwait was awarded the George W. Beadle Award in 2015.
