= Nicola Dalbeth =

Rheumatologist and academic in New Zealand

- Education: University of Otago
- Scientific career
- Fields: Research into diagnosis and management gout
- Workplaces: University of Auckland

Nicola Dalbeth FRSNZ is a New Zealand academic rheumatologist whose research focuses on understanding the impact and mechanisms of gout. She supports clinical and laboratory research programmes and holds dual appointments as a full professor at the University of Auckland and as a consultant for the Auckland District Health Board.

== Education and career ==
Dalbeth completed undergraduate medical training at Otago Medical School in 1995 and rheumatology advanced training in Auckland in 2002. After postgraduate research training at the University of Oxford and Imperial College London, Dalbeth returned to Auckland in 2005 and to take up dual appointments as professor at the University of Auckland and at Auckland District Health Board. In 2016, she was chair of The Health & Safety Commission's expert advisory group on gout.

Dalbeth is a principal investigator in the Auckland Bone and Joint Research Group, and a member of the medical committee for the Auckland Medical Research Foundation. She is co-chair of the Calcium pyrophosphate deposition (CPPD) Working Group, (OMERACT), and was part of the Core Leadership Team for 2020 American College of Rheumatology Guideline for the Management of Gout. Dalbeth is an Associate Investigator at the Maurice Wilkins Centre for Molecular Biodiscovery, and a Consultant for Auckland District Health Board Rheumatology Services.

== Selected research ==
Much of Dalbeth's research that focuses on gout challenges widely held beliefs about the risk factors and causes of the condition. Her work confirms that there are many factors determining gout, but concludes that most people, including some health professionals, view it as a "self-inflicted condition for which dietary solutions are most important and effective, despite no clinical trial data in people with gout to support this approach."

In 2021 in response to data that showed gout disproportionally affects Māori, Dalbeth co-authored a research paper that reviewed inequities in health due to gout management. The paper concluded:

That there are disparities in gout care in Indigenous people is without a doubt. The challenge for healthcare providers in every country, including Aotearoa New Zealand, is to authentically partner with Indigenous people to develop culturally appropriate, acceptable and effective systems to overcome disparities and enable a pathway to health equity and beyond for people with gout. To fail to do so is acceptance of the status quo, and is, by definition, structural racism.

A review of the effectiveness of interventions to improve uptake of urate-lowering therapy (URL) in patients with gout in 2020 noted, in the paper co-edited by Dalbeth, that globally low numbers of patients were being treated with ULT was low. The researchers concluded for this to improve there needed to be a greater patient understanding of the process to get adherence to the therapy, and that nurse-led interventions were often the most effective, [suggesting that this] may be because they involve the most patient engagement, empowering patients to share decisions about their care, which increases the likelihood that they will make the sustained behavioural changes required to take long-term medication."

A paper published in 2021 summarising research that Dalbeth had been involved in, concluded that there was the existence of population-amplified genetic variants conferring risk of gout in Polynesian populations. Dalbeth collaborated on a 2020 study that did a content analysis of visual images used in educational resources about gout. From the data, the researchers concluded: "Key concepts about gout and treatment are underrepresented in the images used in educational resources for patients. A large proportion of the images do not convey useful information about gout or its management."

== Awards and honours ==
Dalbeth was elected a Fellow of the Royal Society of New Zealand in 2019, an "honour that recognises distinction in research, scholarship or the advancement of knowledge at the highest international standards."

In 2021 Dalbeth won the top research award of the medical faculty of the University of Auckland, the Gluckman Medal, for distinguished contribution to research on gout. Professor John Fraser, the Dean of the Faculty of Medical and Health Science said "[that] Nicola's research has contributed to dispelling the many myths about gout and her findings have been instrumental in improving the treatments available for patients with this debilitating disease."

== Publications ==
- American College of Rheumatology guidelines for management of gout. Part 1: systematic nonpharmacologic and pharmacologic therapeutic approaches to hyperuricemia. (2012) This is part 1 of research by a team including Dalbeth, to develop recommendations for effective treatment of gout specifically focusing on Urate-lowering therapy (ULT) and chronic gouty arthritis. The evidence suggested that further studies would be helpful, concluding it was "hoped that publication of these guidelines, along with effective patient education in gout treatments, and the objectives and safety issues of management, will improve patient adherence, quality of care, and outcomes in management of gout."
- American College of Rheumatology guidelines for management of gout. Part 2: therapy and antiinflammatory prophylaxis of acute gouty arthritis. (2012) This was the second part of a task that a group of researchers including Dalbeth that was asked to complete for the American College of Rheumatology (ACR) to develop nonpharmacologic and pharmacologic guidelines for safe and effective treatments in gout. After completing a review of the literature and conducting formal group assessments, they completed the "first ACR guidelines for the therapy and anti-inflammatory prophylaxis of acute gout attacks."
- 2015 Gout classification criteria: an American College of Rheumatology/European League Against Rheumatism collaborative initiative. (2015) Dalbeth was a member of an international group of researchers that did a review of the literature on advanced imaging of gout that provided data to develop the classification criteria.
- CD56bright NK cells are enriched at inflammatory sites and can engage with monocytes in a reciprocal program of activation. (2004) This paper, co-authored by Dalbeth, recorded the findings of research into the role of (N cells) at sites of inflammation. The study showed that NK cells are capable of interacting with monocytes, suggesting that "this interaction is important in the maintenance of inflammation in chronic inflammatory diseases such as rheumatoid arthritis."
- Dose adjustment of allopurinol according to creatinine clearance does not provide adequate control of hyperuricemia in patients with gout. (2006) After examining the guidelines stating that "allopurinol doses should be adjusted according to creatinine clearance...[this paper]...investigated whether such dosing provides adequate control of hyperuricemia...[concluding that]...further work is required to clarify the safety and efficacy of allopurinol dose escalation, particularly in patients with renal impairment."
