= Conrose Park =

Park in Halifax, Nova Scotia, Canada

Coordinates: 44°38′19.7″N 63°36′4.3″W

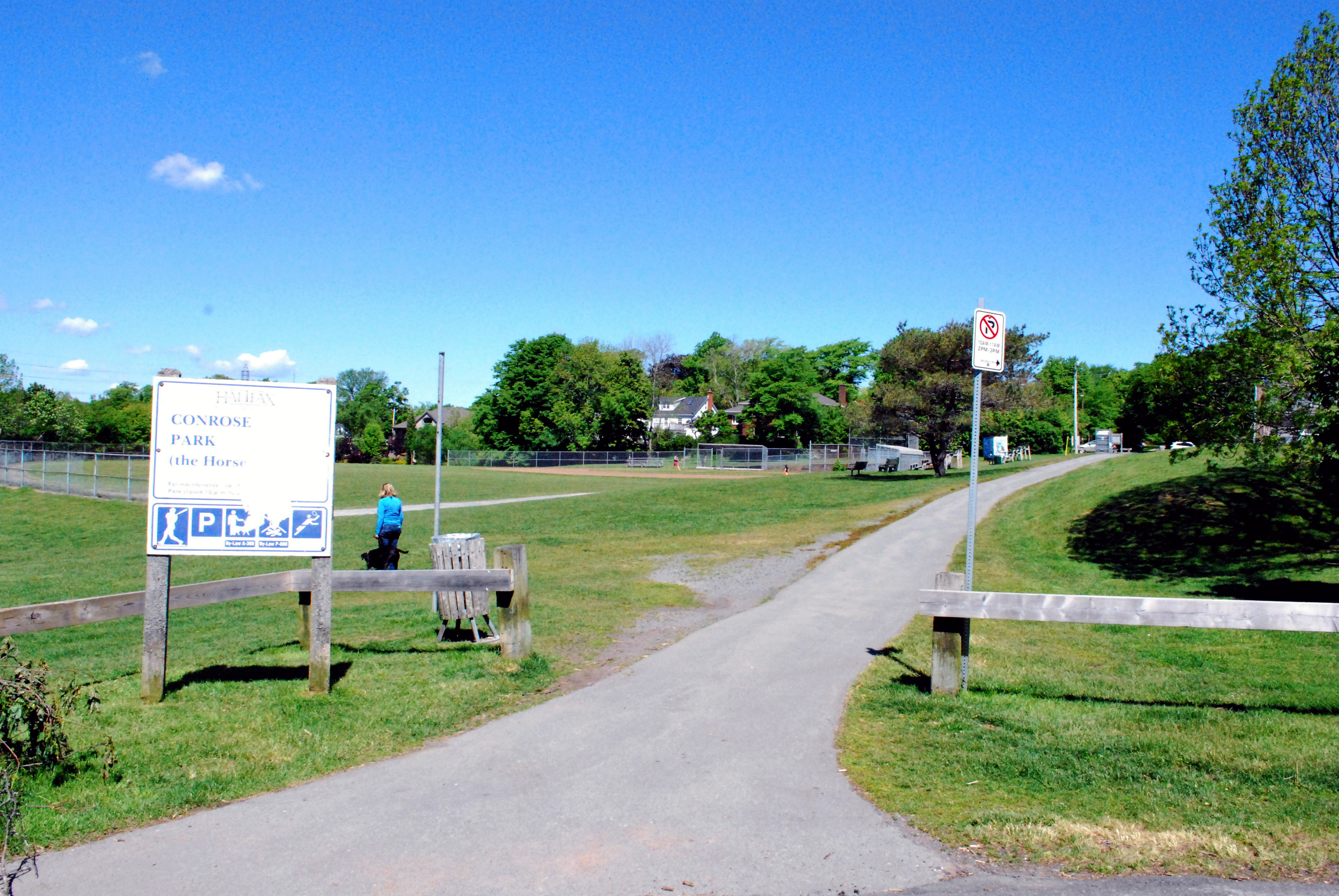
Conrose Park

Conrose Park, also known as the Horsefield, is a Canadian urban park in Halifax, Nova Scotia, in the western area of the Halifax Peninsula.

== Park ==
Located south of Jubilee Road, the park's western boundary is formed by the Canadian National Railway corridor running from Rockingham to the Halifax Ocean Terminal. As such, Conrose Field is an integral part of the proposed Halifax Urban Greenway multi-use hiking and biking trail.

Conrose Park contains two tennis courts, a small baseball diamond, an open field and a small playground with play structures and swings.

Vegetation in the park, particularly along the railway corridor, is largely composed of European pasture grasses and herbs. The explanation for the non-native species is due to their ability to withstand trampling and cutting from the heavy human use of the area. Native plant species can be found in more remote areas of the park and along the rock cut for the railway corridor.

== Day use ==
Conrose is home to the Conrose Minor Baseball association, the Nova Scotia Rugby for the mini-rugby program and is also used by many other organized sporting groups. It is also a popular spot for walking dogs, and jogging. At any given time, people of all ages can be seen enjoying the park.

== After dark ==
Over the years the park has been a popular spot for teens as a hang-out spot, and for pre-drinking before a dance, at times exceeding 100 youths. Many include local teens from the neighbourhood, others have been known to come from across peninsular Halifax, and beyond. This has led at times to vandalism and damage to the facilities at the park, and caused a great disturbance to area residents. Many holes have been cut in the fence along the tracks by youths seeking more privacy, and to quickly escape police.

Popularity of the park fluctuates year by year, and on August 27, 2001 a news conference was held by former councillor Sue Uteck with representatives of the Halifax Regional Police and the local community to announce that the residents want to take back their park.

== Horsefield herbs ==
Some of the herbs on the Horsefield include:

- Bent
- Kentucky bluegrass
- Annual bluegrass
- Red fescue
- Timothy
- Cocksfoot
- Couch
- Native poverty grass
- Ticklegrass
- Clovers
- Dandelions
- Mouse-ear hawkweed
- Knapweed
- Milfoil
- Creeping buttercup
- Stitchwort
- Mouse-ear chickweed
- Knotgrass
