= The Pediatric Infectious Disease Journal =

- Discipline: Pediatrics, infectious disease
- Language: English
- Edited by: John D. Nelson, George H. McCracken, Jr.

Publication details
- Former name(s): Pediatric Infectious Disease
- History: 1982-present
- Publisher: Lippincott Williams & Wilkins
- Frequency: Monthly
- Impact factor: 2.723 (2014)

Standard abbreviations
- ISO 4: Pediatr. Infect. Dis. J.

Indexing
- CODEN: PIDJEV
- ISSN: 0891-3668 (print); 1532-0987 (web)
- OCLC no.: 14710189

Links
- Journal homepage; Online access; Online archive

The Pediatric Infectious Disease Journal is a monthly peer-reviewed medical journal covering research pertaining to infectious diseases in children. It was established in 1982 as a bimonthly journal under the name Pediatric Infectious Disease, obtaining its current name in 1987. It is published by Lippincott Williams & Wilkins and the editors-in-chief are John D. Nelson and George H. McCracken Jr. (University of Texas Southwestern Medical Center).

== Abstracting and indexing ==
The journal is abstracted and indexed in:

- BIOSIS
- MEDLINE/PUBMED
- EMBASE
- SCOPUS
- Science Citation Index Expanded
- Current Contents/Clinical Medicine

According to the Journal Citation Reports, the journal has a 2014 impact factor of 2.723.
