= The Circle (Image Comics) =

Comic book series

- Cover of the first issue.

Publication information
- Publisher: Image Comics
- Schedule: Monthly
- Format: Ongoing series
- Genre: Spy
- Publication date: November 2007 – March 2008
- No. of issues: 5 (As of November 2009)
- Main character(s): Ulee Tarvydas; Ilona Hadzizec; Wallace Christopher

Creative team
- Created by: Brian Reed; Ian Hosfeld
- Written by: Brian Reed
- Artist: Ian Hosfeld
- Letterer(s): Ian Hosfeld; Brian Reed
- Colorist: Len O'Grady
- Editor: Rich Amtower

The Circle is a comic book series written by Brian Reed, with art by Ian Hosfeld.

The story has been described as a "21st century 'A-Team'".

== Publication history ==
The Circle was planned as an ongoing series but only the first five-issue story arc "Goliath Trap" has been published.
