= Canadian Rheumatology Association =

- Type: professional association
- Founded: 1936
- Headquarters: Tecumseh, Ontario, Canada
- Key people: Dr. Nigil Haroon (president), Dr. Ahmad Zbib (CEO)
- Website: rheum.ca

The Canadian Rheumatology Association (CRA) is the national professional association for Canadian rheumatologists. Its peer-reviewed journal is named The Journal of Rheumatology.
