= Richard Lawrence Edwards =

American geochemist

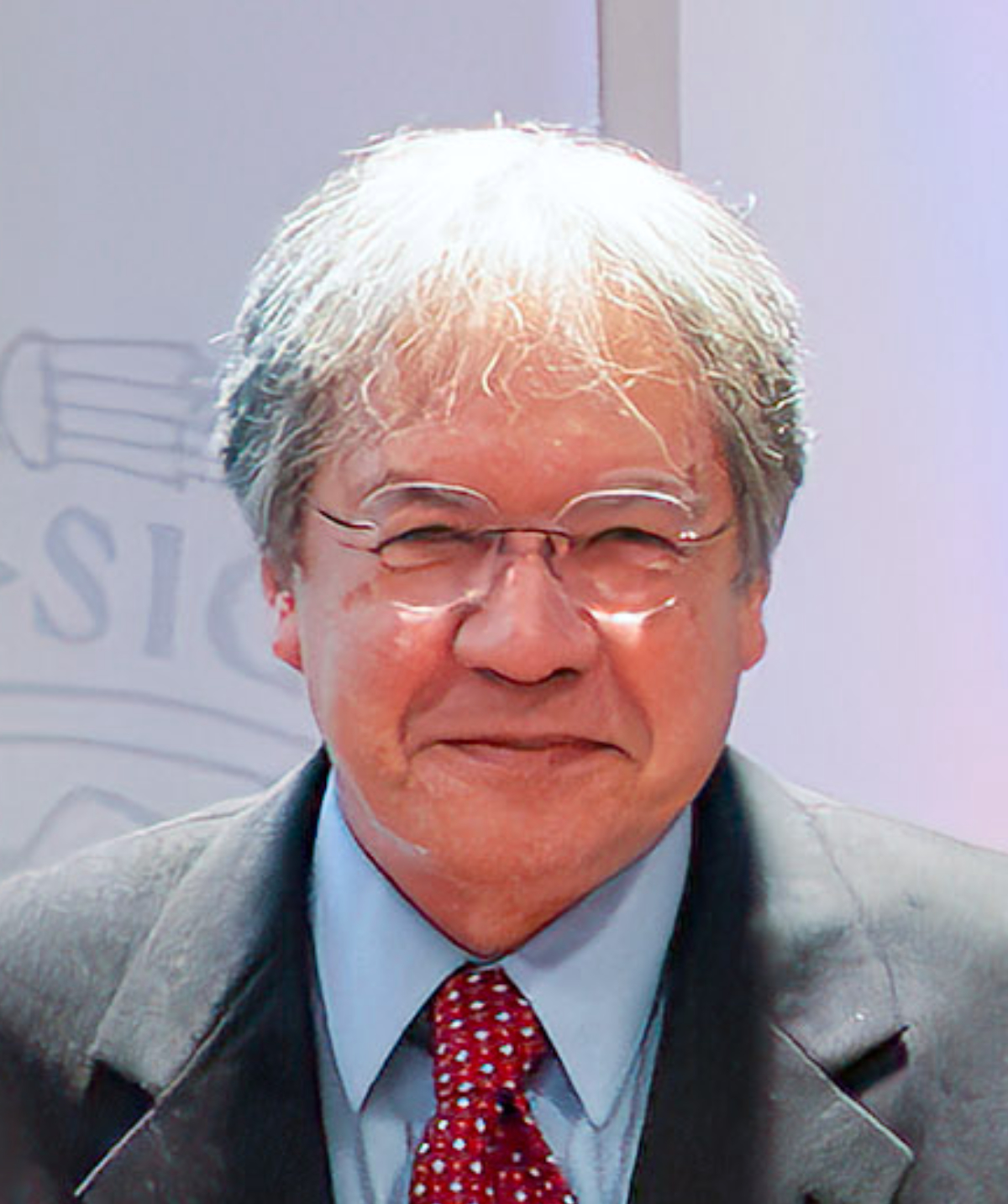
- Other names: Larry Edwards, R. Lawrence Edwards
- Education: California Institute of Technology
- Known for: Improving uranium-thorium dating techniques
- Awards: Arthur L. Day Prize and Lectureship of the National Academy of Sciences Fellow National Academy of Sciences National Medal of Science
- Scientific career
- Fields: Geochemical Principles, Isotope Geology, Uranium–thorium dating
- Thesis: High Precision Thorium-230 Ages of Corals and the Timing of Sea Level Fluctuations in the Late Quaternary (1988)
- Doctoral advisor: Gerald J. Wasserburg
- Website: https://cse.umn.edu/esci/r-lawrence-edwards

Richard Lawrence "Larry" Edwards is an American geochemist and Distinguished McKnight University Professor and Regents Professor at the University of Minnesota. He is one of the most cited and respected geochemists in the world, and is well-known for his contributions to modernizing the uranium-thorium (Th-230) radiometric dating technique.

Edwards earned his Ph.D from the California Institute of Technology in 1988 after studying under Gerald J. Wasserburg. His thesis, entitled High Precision Thorium-230 Ages of Corals and the Timing of Sea Level Fluctuations in the Late Quaternary, discusses the usage of Th-230 dating in the examination of corals at Santo and Malekula Islands, Vanuatu.

Edwards has made notable contributions to anthropology through dating a jawbone at 100000 years old, suggesting that modern humans had inhabited the area of China where the bone was found earlier than previously thought. His collaborations with geochemist Hai Cheng have led to the largest number of environmental science papers published in Nature Index journals by a pair of geochemists.

On January 3rd, 2025, Dr. Edwards received the National Medal of Science.
