= Gordon Horsfield =

Australian cricketer

Personal information
- Born: 24 March 1913; Sydney, Australia
- Died: 25 August 1982 (aged 69); Sydney, Australia
- Source: ESPNcricinfo, 1 January 2017

Gordon Horsfield (24 March 1913 – 25 August 1982) was an Australian cricketer. He played five first-class matches for New South Wales between 1934/35 and 1941/42.

== See also ==
- List of New South Wales representative cricketers
