= Elizabeth Broadbent =

New Zealand health psychologist

- Education: University of Auckland
- Awards: FRSNZ
- Scientific career
- Fields: Robotics, electronic engineering, health psychology
- Workplaces: Transpower New Zealand; University of Auckland
- Thesis: New approaches to the assessment of illness perceptions (2005)

Elizabeth Anne Broadbent FRSNZ is a full professor of health psychology at the University of Auckland. She was elected as a Fellow of the Royal Society Te Apārangi in 2021.

== Academic career ==
Broadbent initially trained as an electronic engineer at the University of Canterbury, completing a Bachelor of Engineering degree with Honours (Electrical and Electronic). She worked at companies Transpower, Électricité de Tahiti, and Robotechnology before continuing her education with a graduate Diploma of Arts from Massey University, and Master of Arts and Doctor of Philosophy degrees at the University of Auckland. Her 2002 master's thesis was on the effects of stress, social support and beliefs on wound healing following surgery. Her PhD thesis, completed in 2005, was titled New approaches to the assessment of illness perceptions.

Broadbent was promoted to full professor at the University of Auckland in 2019.

Broadbent has worked on how robots might help in school situations, both in the classroom and the sick bay, and also how might robots help patients managing chronic lung condition COPD. About 75% of patients in a controlled trial found that having robot assistance at home helped with medication adherence and companionship. Her work on how writing can help recovery from injury and weightloss surgery has been featured in Scientific American Mind, Time magazine, and The Guardian.

== Awards ==
Broadbent was elected as a Fellow of the Royal Society Te Apārangi in 2021. The Society said "One of her most notable contributions is the development and testing of healthcare robots, especially for improving outcomes in rest-home and dementia care and chronic illness...this is innovative interdisciplinary work of exceptional quality".

== Selected publications ==
- Elizabeth Broadbent; Keith J Petrie; Jodie Main; John Weinman (2006). "The brief illness perception questionnaire". Journal of Psychosomatic Research. 60 (6): 631–637. doi:10.1016/j.jpsychores.2005.10.020. PMID 16731240. Wikidata Q50936509.
- Elizabeth Broadbent; Carissa Wilkes; Heidi Koschwanez; John Weinman; Sam Norton; Keith J Petrie (2015). "A systematic review and meta-analysis of the Brief Illness Perception Questionnaire". Psychology & Health. 30 (11): 1361–1385. doi:10.1080/08870446.2015.1070851. PMID 26181764. Wikidata Q38548518.
- E. Broadbent; R. Stafford; B. MacDonald (2009). "Acceptance of Healthcare Robots for the Older Population: Review and Future Directions". International journal of social robotics. 1 (4): 319–330. doi:10.1007/s12369-009-0030-6. Wikidata Q115258302.
- Hayley Robinson; Bruce Macdonald; Ngaire Kerse; Elizabeth Broadbent (2013). "The psychosocial effects of a companion robot: a randomized controlled trial". Journal of the American Medical Directors Association. 14 (9): 661–667. doi:10.1016/j.jamda.2013.02.007. PMID 23545466. Wikidata Q45166572.
- Elizabeth Broadbent; Liesje Donkin; Julia C Stroh (2011). "Illness and treatment perceptions are associated with adherence to medications, diet, and exercise in diabetic patients". Diabetes Care. 34 (2): 338–340. doi:10.2337/dc10-1779. PMC 3024345. PMID 21270191. Wikidata Q34507111.
