= Halifax Urban Greenway =

The Halifax Urban Greenway is a concept for a multi-use recreational trail, called a greenway, in Nova Scotia on the southwestern part of the Halifax Peninsula. This proposed greenway is not a rail trail, but is intended to pass through a narrow greenbelt along the edges of an active rail corridor, several dozen feet in elevation above the railway tracks.

An extensive deep rock cut was created throughout this part of the Halifax Peninsula in 1916-1918 for Canadian Government Railways access to the Halifax Ocean Terminal. Today, the Canadian National Railway uses the corridor for its freight trains and Via Rail Canada uses it for passenger trains.

The areas along the edge of the cut at street level have been preserved from urban development and have resulted in a valuable natural greenspace and appearing as a river of greenery flowing through this part of the city. The vegetation and continuous tree canopy provides habitat for birds, wildflowers and other flora and fauna.

The aim of planners is to create a trail system along the top of the rock cut, which would link an area from Chebucto Road to Young Avenue, connecting the Armdale Rotary with Point Pleasant Park.

== Benefits ==
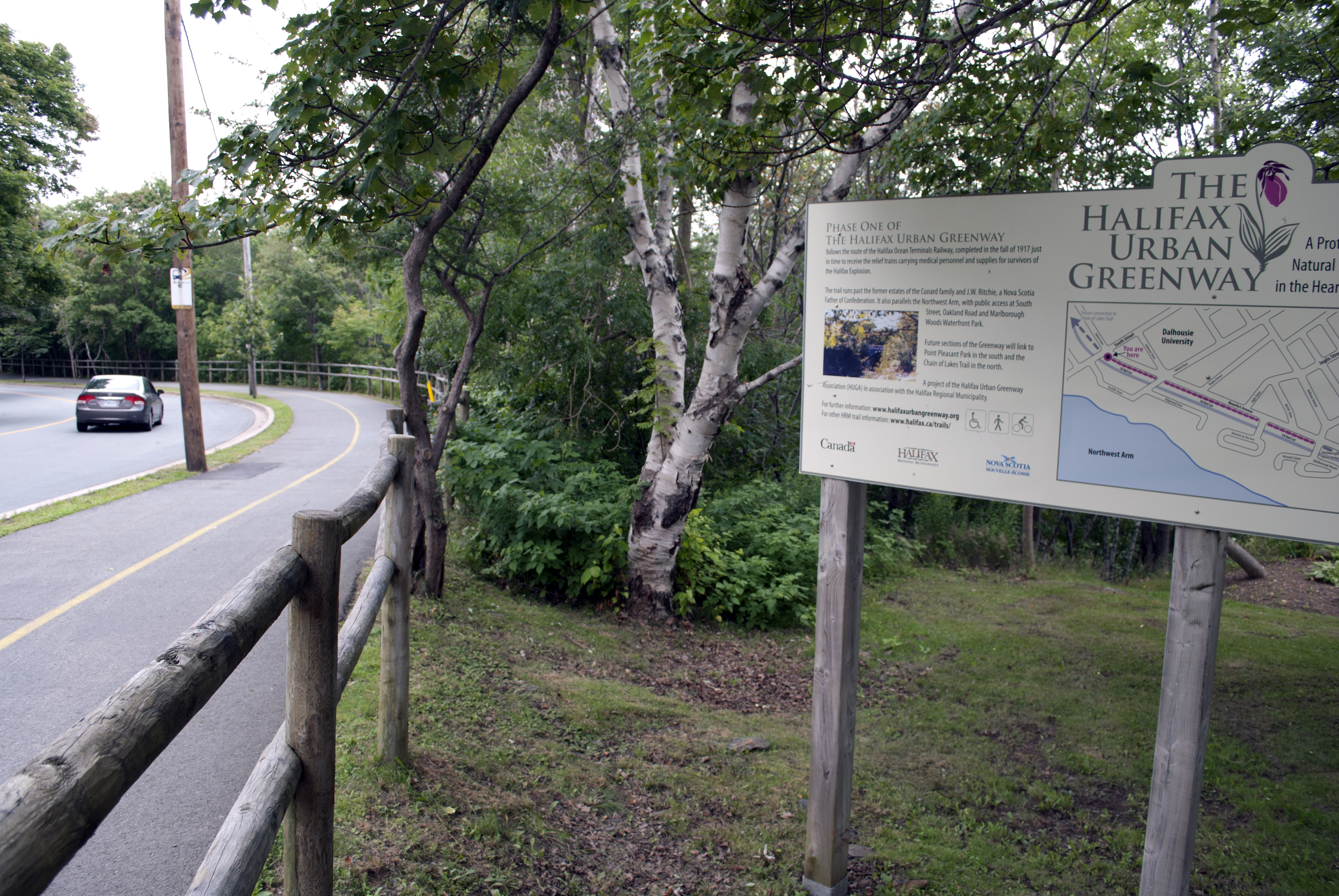
HUGA Trail

Green space and natural habitat in this part of Halifax would be preserved. Residents would be able to walk, bike and jog on the trail which would connect isolated sections of parkland along the corridor as well as water access points on the Northwest Arm.

Major points of interest along the corridor include Conrose Field, Dalhousie University, Saint Mary's University, and Point Pleasant Park. It is hoped that someday the Halifax Urban Greenway would link to other trails heading along the waterfront on its south-eastern end and towards Bedford Basin on its northwestern end.

The Halifax Urban Greenway Association is a community organization that has been set up to work with the railway company, HRM, the universities, volunteers, business, corporations, and foundations to plan for the preservation of the greenway and its development for public access.

== Progress ==
In the fall of 2009 Phase One of the concept plan was opened to public use.

A segment of multi-use path intended to form part of the Halifax Urban Greenway was completed in late 2024 along Coburg Road.

== See also ==
- Cycling in Halifax, Nova Scotia
