= Julia Horsfield =

New Zealand biochemist and developmental geneticist

- Born: Julia Anne Horsfield
- Awards: Fulbright scholarship

Academic background
- Education: Victoria University of Wellington
- Alma mater: University of Otago

Academic work
- Discipline: Biochemist, developmental geneticist
- Institutions: University of Adelaide; University of Auckland; University of Otago

Julia Anne Horsfield is a New Zealand biochemist and developmental geneticist. She is professor of pathology at the University of Otago and director of Genetics Otago and the Otago Zebrafish Facility.

== Academic career ==
Horsfield has a BSc from Victoria University of Wellington (1984–1988) and a PhD from the University of Otago (1992–1995). She moved to Australia as a research fellow of the University of Adelaide (1996–1999), then returned to New Zealand as a research fellow at the University of Auckland (1999–2007). In 2007 she joined the University of Otago, where she set up the Otago Zebrafish Facility to research cancer, stem cell biology and epigenetics. Her work focuses on the protein cohesin and its links to leukaemia.

Horsfield won a grant to research gout and how genetics affect the human body's control of uric acid.

In February 2019, Horsfield was awarded a Fulbright scholarship to extend her research "using single-cell sequencing to research how cell fate decisions are controlled in the zebrafish animal model" at University of California, Davis.

Horsfield was promoted to full professor at the University of Otago, effective 1 February 2020.

== Selected works ==
- Antonie Kline; Ian D Krantz; Masashige Bando; et al. (2019). "Cornelia de Lange syndrome, related disorders, and the Cohesin complex: Abstracts from the 8th biennial scientific and educational symposium 2018". American Journal of Medical Genetics. 179 (6): 1080–1090. doi:10.1002/ajmg.a.61108. PMID 30874362. Wikidata Q92383071.
- Horsfield, Julia Anne (2019). "Packaging development: how chromatin controls transcription in zebrafish embryogenesis". Biochemical Society Transactions. 47 (2): 713–724. doi:10.1042/bst20180617. PMID 30952803. Wikidata Q92885551.
- Judith Marsman; Gregory Gimenez; Robert C Day; Horsfield, Julia Anne; Jones, Gregory (2020). "A non-coding genetic variant associated with abdominal aortic aneurysm alters ERG gene regulation". Human Molecular Genetics. 29 (4): 554–565. doi:10.1093/hmg/ddz256. PMC 7068029. PMID 31691800. Wikidata Q91135241.
- Sarada Ketharnathan; Anastasia Labudina; Horsfield, Julia Anne (2020). "Cohesin Components Stag1 and Stag2 Differentially Influence Haematopoietic Mesoderm Development in Zebrafish Embryos". Frontiers in Cell and Developmental Biology. 8 617545. doi:10.3389/fcell.2020.617545. PMC 7750468. PMID 33365313. Wikidata Q104578547.
