= The Journal of Rheumatology =

- Discipline: Rheumatology
- Language: English
- Edited by: Earl D. Silverman

Publication details
- History: 1974-present
- Publisher: Journal of Rheumatology Publishing Company
- Frequency: Monthly
- Open access: Hybrid
- Impact factor: 4.666 (2020)

Standard abbreviations
- ISO 4: J. Rheumatol.

Indexing
- CODEN: JRHUA9
- ISSN: 0315-162X (print); 1499-2752 (web)
- OCLC no.: 01181728

Links
- Journal homepage; Online access; Online archive

The Journal of Rheumatology is a peer-reviewed medical journal addressing topics in rheumatology and arthritis. It is an official journal of the Canadian Rheumatology Association. From 1992 to 2020 the journal has published the proceedings of Outcome Measures in Rheumatology (OMERACT) conferences .
