= The Amazing Race Canada 8 =

Season of television series

- Season 8
- Presented by: Jon Montgomery
- No. of teams: 10
- Winners: Catherine Wreford & Craig Ramsay
- No. of legs: 11
- Distance traveled: 20,000 km (12,000 mi)
- No. of episodes: 11

Release
- Original network: CTV
- Original release: July 5 – September 20, 2022

Additional information
- Filming dates: April 26 – May 21, 2022

Series chronology
- ← Previous; Season 7 Next → Season 9

The Amazing Race Canada 8 is the eighth season of The Amazing Race Canada, a Canadian reality competition show based on the American series The Amazing Race. Hosted by Jon Montgomery, it featured ten teams of two, each with a pre-existing relationship, in a race across Canada. The grand prize included a CA$250,000 cash payout, a trip for two around the world, and two Chevrolet Silverado ZR2s. This season visited five provinces and travelled over 20,000 kilometres (12,000 mi) during eleven legs. Starting in Mont-Tremblant, Quebec, racers travelled through Quebec, Alberta, British Columbia, Ontario, and New Brunswick before finishing in Vancouver. New twists introduced in this season include the On Ramp, which was a task that gave teams the chance to reenter The Amazing Race Canada; the Pass, which forced a team to stop racing until another team passed them; a double elimination leg; and four teams racing in the final leg. The season was originally scheduled to premiere on CTV in July 2020; however, after the COVID-19 pandemic forced production to postpone the season for two years due to travel restrictions between selected Canadian provinces, it premiered on July 5, 2022 with a preseason special etalk Presents: The Amazing Race Canada airing on July 1. The season finale aired on September 20, 2022.

Best friends and Broadway performers Catherine Wreford and Craig Ramsay were the winners of this season, while siblings Jesse Cockney and Marika Sila finished in second place, sisters Franca and Nella Brodett finished in third place, and Brendan and Connor McDougall finished in fourth place.

== Production ==
=== Development and filming ===
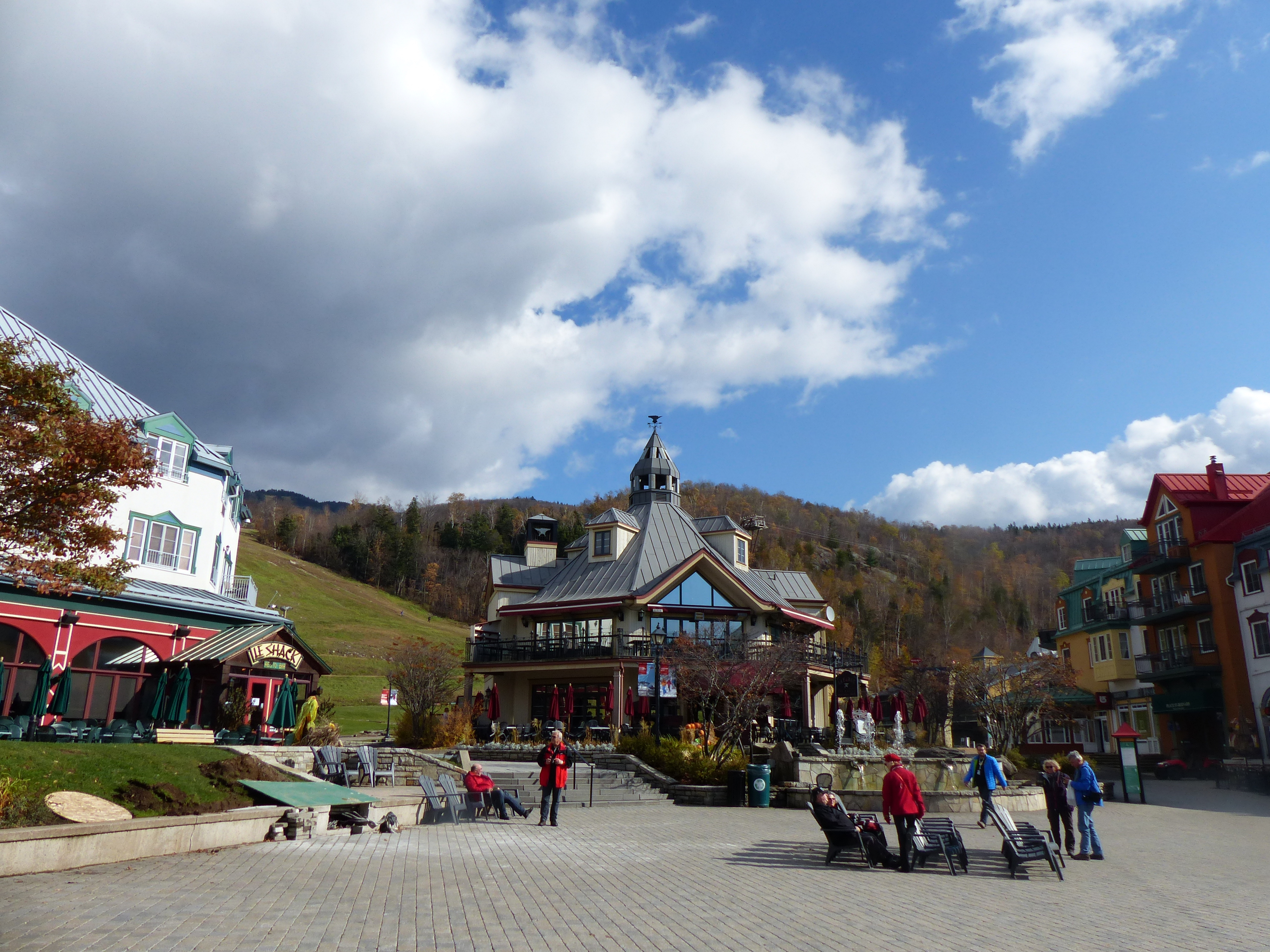
Teams began The Amazing Race Canada 8 from the base of Mont Tremblant Resort in Mont-Tremblant.

The day after the finale of Season 7, CTV announced the renewal of the show for an eighth season.

After the COVID-19 pandemic led to CBS suspending production of the thirty-third season of American edition of The Amazing Race and Network 10 delaying the production of fifth season of The Amazing Race Australia, before eventually filming that season around Australia, Mike Cosentino, the President of Content and Programming at Bell Media, stated in mid-March 2020 that "decisions around the upcoming eighth season will be made with the health and safety of the Racers and the crew as the top priority." As the COVID-19 pandemic in Canada worsened, Consentino stated two months later that pre-production for the upcoming season had been halted due to safety concerns. On June 23, 2020, the show announced on its social media that the season had been postponed until 2021. Insight Productions CEO John Brunton then stated in an interview on June 3, 2021 that the season would be delayed a second time to 2022 at the latest for safety reasons. Bell Media confirmed the second postponement at upfronts a week later with Justin Stockman, Bell Media's vice-president of content development and programming, announcing that the show would be a part of CTV's summer 2022 schedule.

On April 26, 2022, Ivanoh Demers of Radio-Canada reported that crew members were at La Grande Roue de Montréal. Teams were in Lethbridge, Alberta on April 30. On May 1, the show filmed in Fernie, British Columbia. Filming in Canmore, Alberta occurred on May 4. Racers were spotted in Kelowna and Vernon, British Columbia on May 6 & 7. Filming took place in Belleville and Picton, Ontario on May 12. A task at the Richmond Night Market occurred on May 21, the date when filming officially wrapped.

For the first time in the series, host Jon Montgomery doesn't introduce the teams; instead, the teams introduce themselves.

This season introduced two new obstacles: the On Ramp and the Pass. The On Ramp was a task that allowed teams to find an On Ramp Pass and return to The Amazing Race Canada. The Pass was an obstacle that is similar to the Yield. The team that received the Pass would have to wait for another team to arrive and pass them before continuing on. Also, for the first time in Amazing Race Canada history, four teams competed in the final leg. Similar to the sixth Vietnamese season, all four remaining teams in this season crossed the Finish Line.

=== Casting ===
Casting for the season initially began on October 10, 2019 with a deadline of December 1. On January 8, 2020, the first stage of casting for this season was completed. Due to the COVID-19 pandemic in Canada, contestants were required to be fully vaccinated.

=== Marketing ===
Chevrolet and Expedia returned as sponsors. New sponsors included Desjardins Group, Subway Canada, Destination BC, GURU Organic Energy, Marshalls, Tourism Richmond, Trans Canada Trail, Disney+, which promoted Pinocchio and Andor, and Marvel Studios, which promoted Thor: Love and Thunder and She-Hulk: Attorney at Law.

== Cast ==
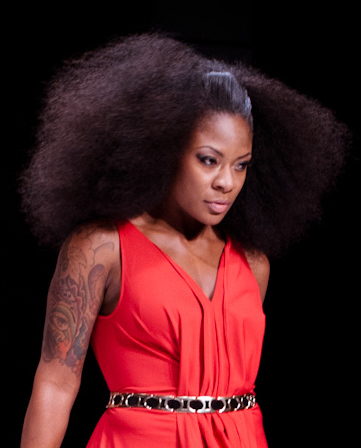
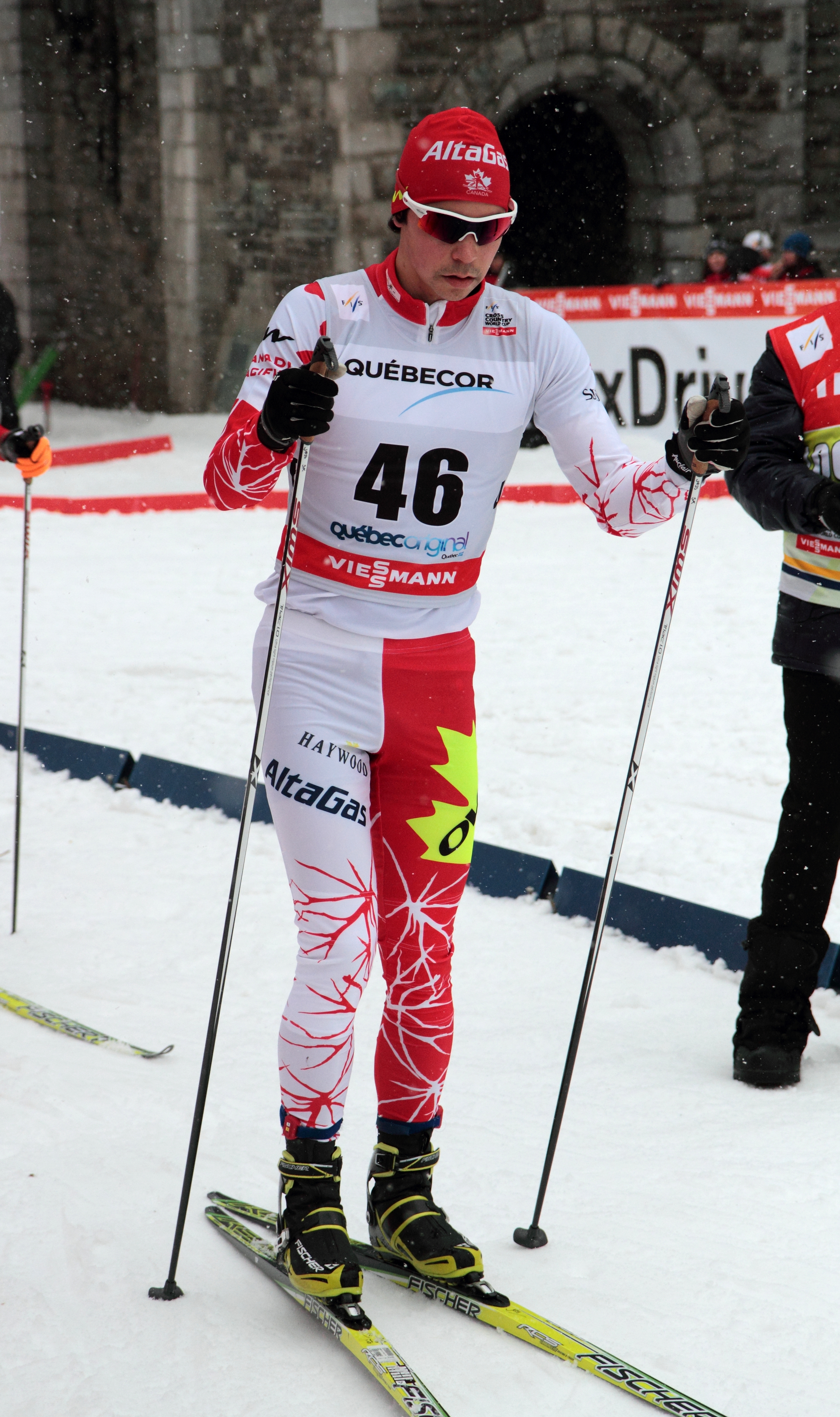
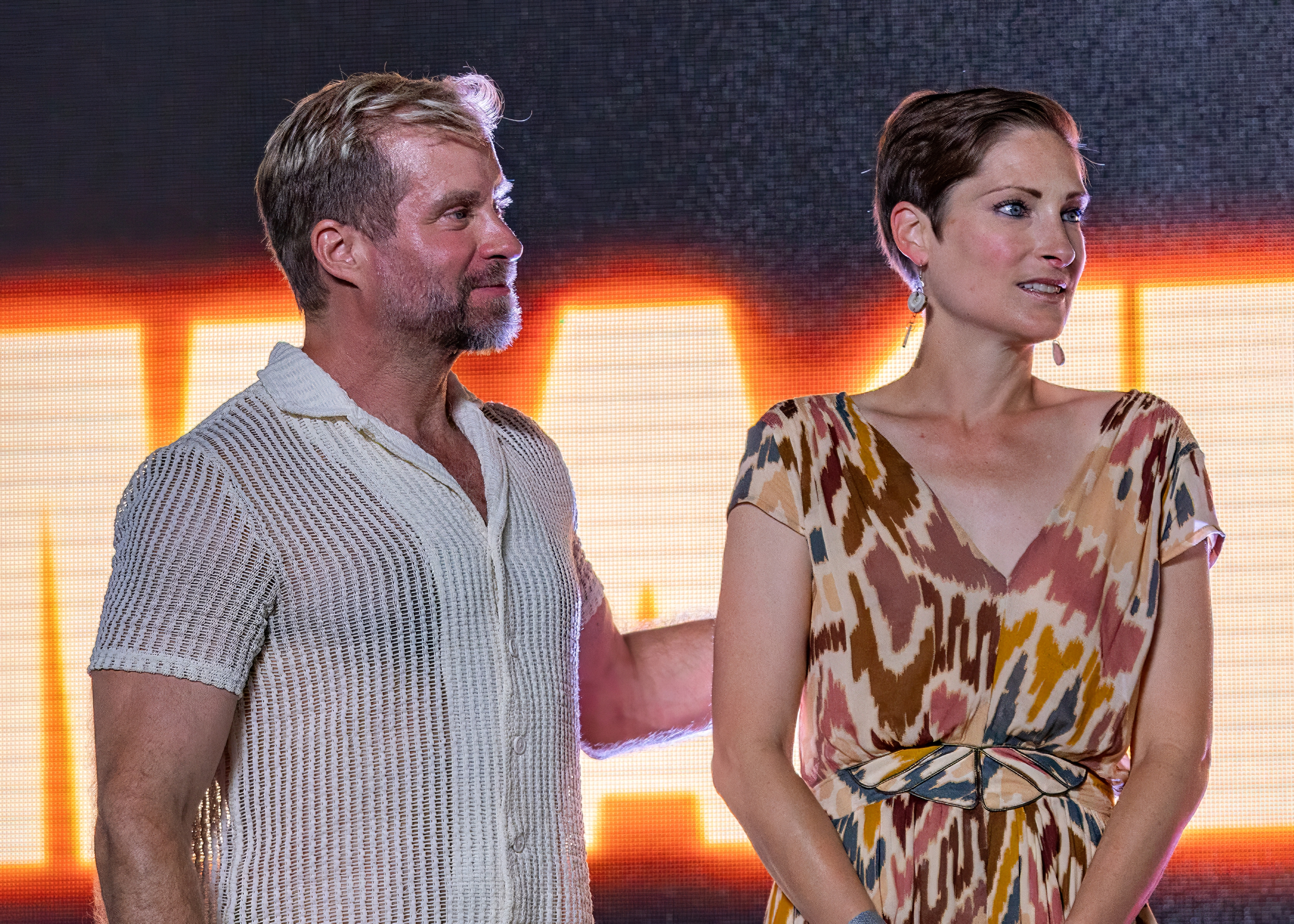
From left to right: Jully Black, Jesse Cockney, Craig Ramsay, and Catherine Wreford

The cast includes Big Brother Canada 9 winner Tychon Carter-Newman, Broadway theatre actress Catherine Wreford, Inuvialuit Olympic cross-country skier Jesse Cockney, actress and Inuvialuit activist Marika Sila, and singer and Juno Award-winning artist Jully Black.

Contestants	Age	Relationship	Hometown	Status
Jully Black	(Returned to competition)			Eliminated 1st (in Montreal, Quebec)
Kathy Hunter	(Returned to competition)			Eliminated 1st (in Montreal, Quebec)
Cassie Day	(Returned to competition)			Eliminated 2nd (in Fernie, British Columbia)
Jahmeek Murray	(Returned to competition)			Eliminated 2nd (in Fernie, British Columbia)
Jully Black	44	Friends	Toronto, Ontario	Eliminated 3rd (in Vernon, British Columbia)
Kathy Hunter	41	Friends	Regina, Saskatchewan	Eliminated 3rd (in Vernon, British Columbia)
Dennis Ashe	42	Uncle & Nephew	Halifax, Nova Scotia	Eliminated 4th (in London, Ontario)
Durrell Borden	33	Uncle & Nephew	Halifax, Nova Scotia	Eliminated 4th (in London, Ontario)
Cedric Newman	50	Father & Son	Montreal, Quebec	Eliminated 5th & 6th (in Sandbanks Provincial Park, Ontario)
Tychon Carter-Newman	30	Father & Son	Montreal, Quebec	Eliminated 5th & 6th (in Sandbanks Provincial Park, Ontario)
Cassie Day	31	Engaged	Toronto, Ontario	Eliminated 5th & 6th (in Sandbanks Provincial Park, Ontario)
Jahmeek Murray	32	Engaged	Toronto, Ontario	Eliminated 5th & 6th (in Sandbanks Provincial Park, Ontario)
Court Larabee	39	Dating Couple	Whistler, British Columbia	Eliminated 7th (in Pokeshaw, New Brunswick)
Ali Clark	33	Dating Couple	Fernie, British Columbia	Eliminated 7th (in Pokeshaw, New Brunswick)
Beverley Cheng	30	Friends	Toronto, Ontario	Eliminated 8th (in Georgian Bluffs, Ontario)
Veronica Skye	32	Friends	Vancouver, British Columbia	Eliminated 8th (in Georgian Bluffs, Ontario)
Brendan McDougall	29	Brothers	McDougall, Ontario	Fourth place
Connor McDougall	26	Brothers	McDougall, Ontario	Fourth place
Franca Brodett	32	Sisters	Edmonton, Alberta	Third place
Nella Brodett	30	Sisters	Edmonton, Alberta	Third place
Jesse Cockney	32	Siblings	Canmore, Alberta	Runners-up
Marika Sila	29	Siblings	Canmore, Alberta	Runners-up
Catherine Wreford	42	Friends	Winnipeg, Manitoba	Winners
Craig Ramsay	45	Friends	Windsor, Ontario	Winners

Future appearances

Brendan McDougall competed with Sam May from season 10 on season 11.

In 2024, Cedric Newman competed on the second season of The Traitors Canada. In 2025, Cedric & Tychon competed on Family Feud Canada.

== Results ==
The following teams are listed with their placements in each leg. Placements are listed in finishing order.

- A red placement with a dagger (†) indicates that the team was eliminated.
- An underlined blue placement with a double-dagger (‡) indicates that the team was the last to arrive at a Pit Stop in a non-elimination leg, and had to perform a Speed Bump task in the following leg.
- An italicized and underlined placement indicates that the team was the last to arrive at a Pit Stop, but there was no rest period at the Pit Stop and all teams were instructed to continue racing.
- A purple ε indicates that the team used an Express Pass on that leg to bypass one of their tasks.
- A brown ∈ indicates that the team used the Pass and a brown ∋ indicates the team on the receiving end of the Pass.
- A teal х indicates that the leg featured a Face Off challenge.

Team placement (by leg)
Team	1	2	3	4	5	6	7	8x (Note: This leg featured a Face Off challenge.)	9	10x	11
Catherine & Craig	5th	5th	1st	Removed from competition (Note: Catherine & Craig, Court & Ali, and Dennis & Durrell were removed from the competition due to COVID-19. As a result, Cassie & Jahmeek and Jully & Kathy re-entered the competition as replacement teams.)		7th (Note: Catherine & Craig and Court & Ali found the On Ramp pass and were able to re-enter the race.)	3rd	4th	1st	2nd	1st
Jesse & Marika	8th	2nd	4th	2nd	1st	6thɛ (Note: This team used their Express Pass to bypass one of the tasks on this leg.)	1st	1st	4th	3rd	2nd
Franca & Nella	4th	1st	7th	3rd	2nd	1st	2nd^{∈}_{ɛ} (Note: Franca & Nelia used the Pass against Beverly & Veronica.)	3rd	2nd	4th	3rd
Brendan & Connor	1st	4th	2nd	1st	3rd	2nd	4thε	6th‡	5th	1st	4th
Beverley & Veronica	2nd	3rd	3rd	6th	4th	4th	5th∋	2nd	3rd	5th†	
Court & Ali	6th	9th (Note: This team arrived last at the Pit Stop, but they were instructed to continue racing.)	5th	Removed from competition		8th	6th	5th	6th†		
Cedric & Tychon	9th	6th	6th	4th	6th	3rd	7th† (Note: This was a double-elimination leg; the last two teams to check in at the Pit Stop were both eliminated.)				
Cassie & Jahmeek	3rd	8th	9th†	7th‡	5th	5th	8th†				
Dennis & Durrell	7th	7th	8th	Removed from competition		9th† (Note: Dennis & Durrell were eliminated from the race when they failed to find one of the On Ramp passes.)					
Jully & Kathy	10th†			5th	7th†						

== Race summary ==
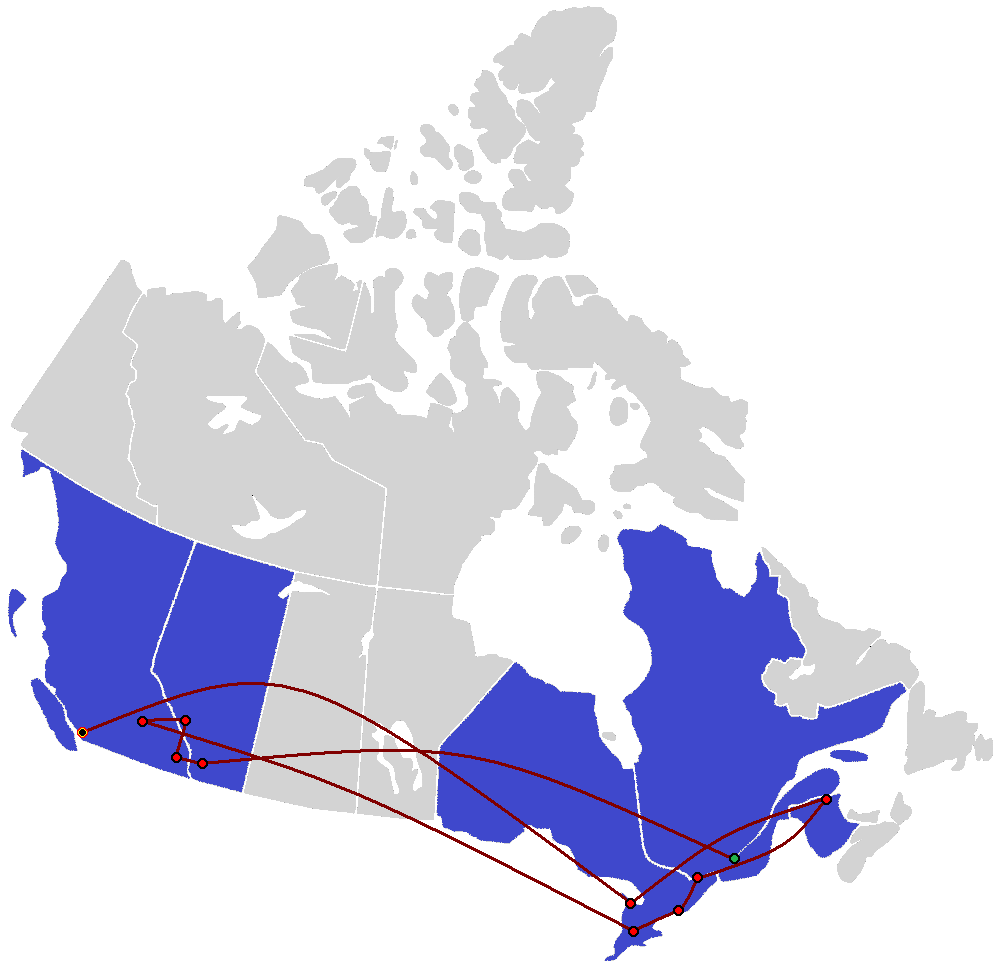
The route map of The Amazing Race Canada 8.

Destinations	Air travel Rail travel Water travel Bus travel Helicopter travel Bicycle travel Gondola travel
Route Markers	Detour Roadblock Pass Face Off Speed Bump On Ramp Pit Stop

=== Leg 1 (Quebec) ===
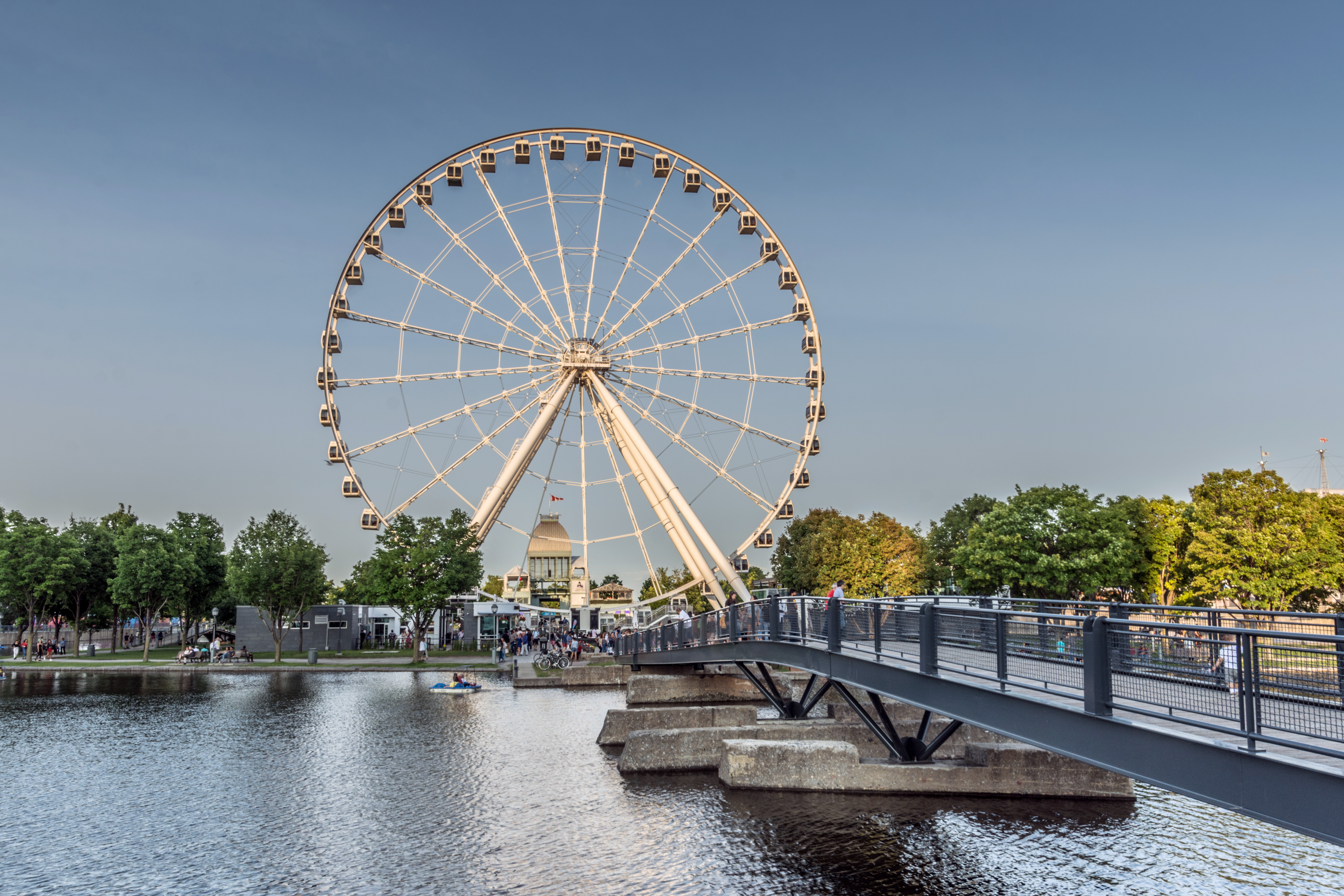
The first Roadblock of The Amazing Race Canada 8 was at La Grande Roue de Montréal.

- Episode 1: "Come on Doodlebug" (July 5, 2022)
- Prizes: A trip for two to Los Angeles, California, including tickets to the Hollywood premiere of Thor: Love and Thunder; a $2,500 Marshalls gift card; and three Express Passes (awarded to Brendan & Connor)
- Eliminated: Jully & Kathy

Locations

- Mont-Tremblant, Quebec (Mont Tremblant Resort – Place St-Bernard) (Starting Line)
- Mont-Tremblant (Village Dock) → Montreal (Old Montreal)
- Montreal (La Grande Roue de Montréal)
- Montreal (Upstairs Jazz or The Wiggle Room)
- Montreal (Rialto Theatre)

Episode summary

- Teams set off from the starting line at Mont Tremblant Resort and had to search for five marked plaques in order to decode a book cipher. After unscrambling their letters to spell OLD MONTREAL, teams received their next clue, which directed them to the Mont-Tremblant village dock, where they had to sign up for one of two buses to Old Montreal, each of which would carry five teams and departed 15 minutes apart. Once there, teams had to find one of two people wearing flat-panel display digital posters for Thor: Love and Thunder in order to receive their next clue and a piece of Mjölnir.
- In this season's first Roadblock, one team member had to climb 200 feet (61 m) to the top of La Grande Roue de Montréal and retrieve their next clue and another piece of Mjölnir.
- This season's first Detour was a choice between Jazz and Pizzazz. In Jazz, teams had to perform a song by Juno Award winner Ranee Lee, which had to include improvised scat singing, in order to receive their next clue and another piece of Mjölnir. In Pizzazz, teams had to perform a burlesque routine, which included removing articles of their costumes in the correct order, in order to receive their next clue and a piece of Mjölnir.
- At the Rialto Theatre, teams had to assemble their pieces of Mjölnir before they could check into the Pit Stop.

=== Leg 2 (Quebec → Alberta) ===
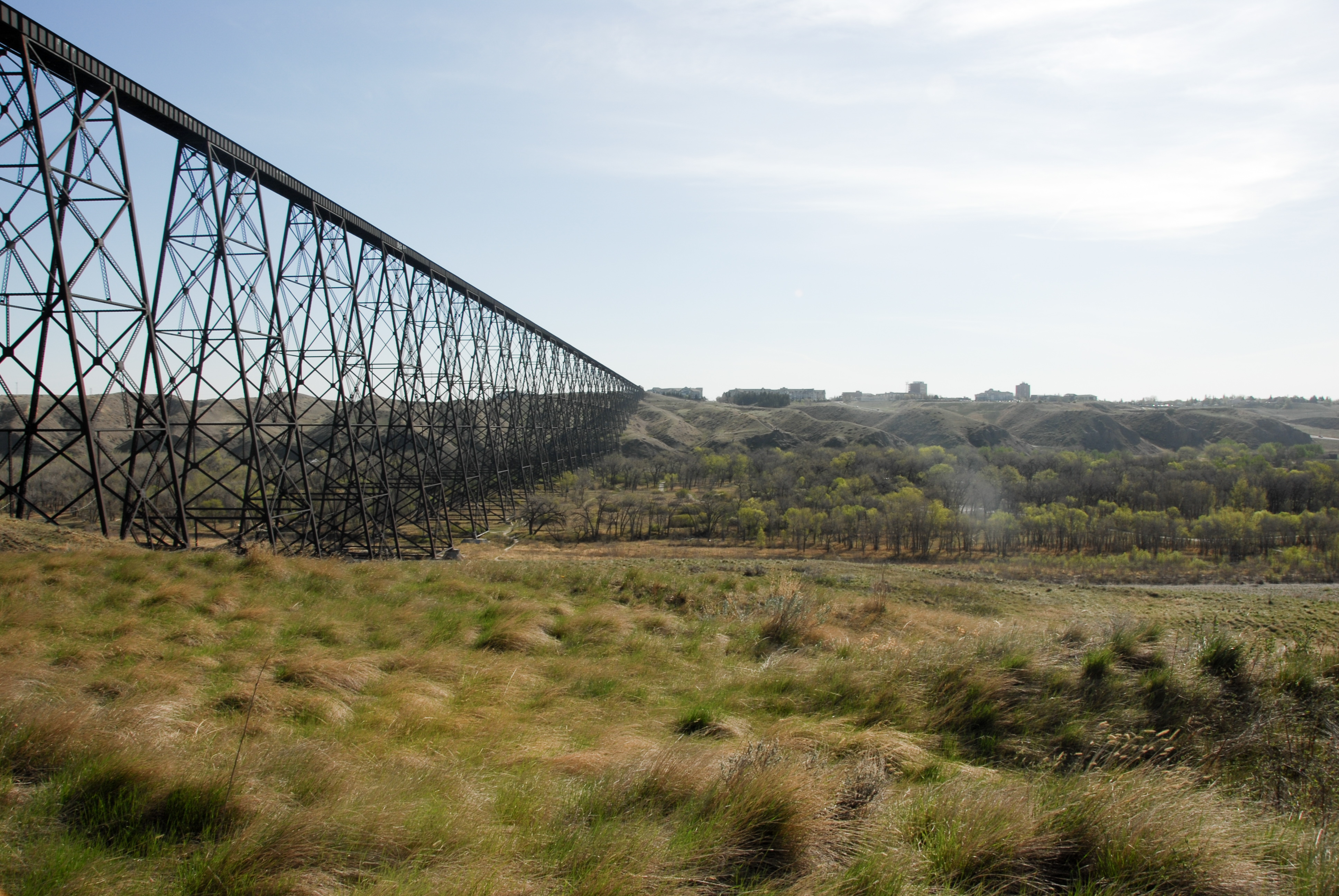
Once in Lethbridge, Alberta, teams travelled to Indian Battle Park and encountered a Detour.

- Episode 2: "Goatageddon" (July 12, 2022)
- Prizes: A trip for two to Lima, Peru, a $5,000 Marshalls gift card, and a $5,000 Subway gift card (awarded to Franca & Nella)

Locations

- Montreal (Place des Arts)
- Montreal → Calgary, Alberta (Calgary International Airport)
- Lethbridge (Indian Battle Park – Rattlesnake Statue)
- Lethbridge (Helen Schuler Nature Centre or Fort Whoop-Up)
- Lethbridge (Subway)
- Lethbridge (Ctrl V Virtual Reality Arcade)
- Waterton Park (Prince of Wales Hotel)

Episode summary

- At the start of this leg, teams were instructed to fly to Calgary, Alberta. Once there, teams had to search the airport parking lot for a marked SUV, which contained their next clue. Teams were directed to Indian Battle Park in Lethbridge, where they had to watch a Siksika dance before receiving a golden eagle feather and their next clue.
- This leg's Detour was a choice between Hoot or Herd. In Hoot, one team member had to memorize seven owl sounds and the other team member had to memorize descriptions of the sounds. When teams could match the sounds to the descriptions, they received their next clue. In Herd, teams had to choose a coloured bandana, find nine goats wearing the same coloured bandanas, and correctly add the numbers on the bandanas from memory in order to receive their next clue.
- At a Subway restaurant in Lethbridge, teams had to memorize a list of vegetables (22 tomatoes, 15 bell peppers, 18 onions, and 27 cucumbers), collect the vegetables from three farm stands outside the city, and deliver them to the restaurant to receive their next clue and free Subway sandwiches.
- In this leg's Roadblock, one team member had to don a virtual reality headset, play a game of Rhythmatic, and score at least 90% in order to receive their next clue directing them to the Pit Stop: the Prince of Wales Hotel in Waterton Park.

Additional note

- By happenstance, retired National Hockey League player Ron Sutter helped siblings Jesse Cockney and Marika Sila with directions during this leg.
- There was no elimination at the end of this leg; all teams were instead instructed to continue racing.

=== Leg 3 (Alberta → British Columbia) ===
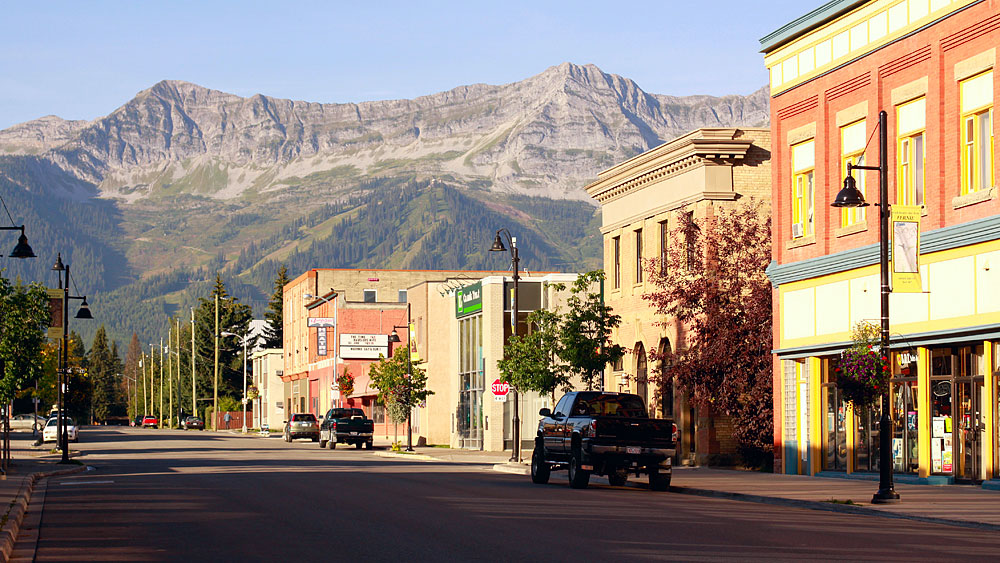
The city of Fernie, British Columbia, hosted the third leg.

- Episode 3: "We Love Weenies!" (July 19, 2022)
- Prizes: A trip for two to Bangkok, Thailand, and a $2,000 Marshalls gift card (awarded to Catherine & Craig)
- Eliminated: Cassie & Jahmeek

Locations

- Waterton Park (Pat's Waterton → Wieners of Waterton)
- Pincher Station (Grain Elevator) → Sparwood, British Columbia (Terex Titan)
- Fernie (Kootenay Fly Shop & Guiding Co. & Elk River or GearHub Sports)
- Fernie (2nd Avenue)
- Fernie (Fernie Golf Course – 4th Hole)

Episode summary

- At Pat's Waterton, teams had to pedal a Surrey bike to Wieners of Waterton, choose a list of four food orders, and deliver the food by bicycle to the given addresses from memory in order to receive their next clue. Teams then drove to Pincher Station's grain elevator and signed up for one of two buses, the first carrying four teams and the second carrying five teams, to Sparwood. Once there, teams found a marked SUV, which contained their next clue.
- This leg's Detour was a choice between Learning to Fly or Ready to Roll. In Learning to Fly, teams had to listen to a fishing story that incorporated quirky names for fly fishing lures, run one kilometre (0.62 mi) to the Elk River, and arrange a set of twenty fishing lures in the order that they were mentioned in the story to receive their next clue. In Ready to Roll, teams had to assemble a mountain bicycle so that it matched an example in order to receive their next clue.
- In this leg's Roadblock, one team member had to don a leotard and leg warmers and perform a 1980s-style aerobics routine to the satisfaction of the instructor in order to receive their next clue directing them to the Pit Stop: the fourth hole of the Fernie Golf Course.

=== Leg 4 (British Columbia → Alberta) ===
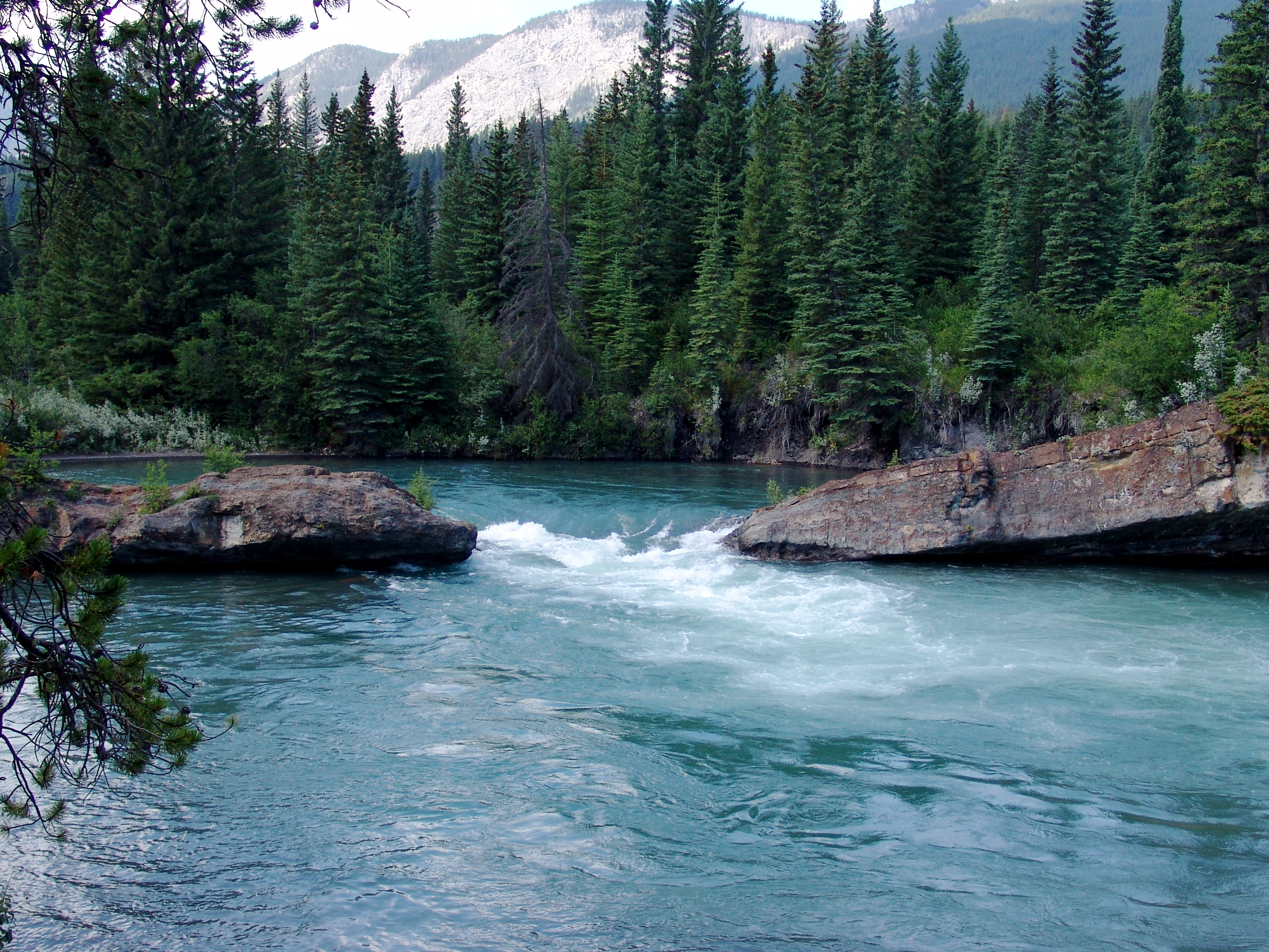
While in Kananaskis Country, teams used inflatable canoes to padde down the Kananaskis River.

- Episode 4: "Feel the Fear and Do It Anyways" (July 26, 2022)
- Prizes: A trip for two to Buenos Aires, Argentina, and a $1,500 Marshalls gift card (awarded to Brendan & Connor)

Locations

- Fernie (2nd Avenue)
- Fernie (Fernie City Hall) → Kananaskis Country, Alberta (Canoe Meadows)
- Kananaskis Country (Kananaskis River)
- Kananaskis Country (Star 6 Ranch – Red Barn)
- Canmore (Trans Canada Trail – Bow River)
- Canmore (Canmore Nordic Centre)
- Canmore (Canmore Nordic Centre – Biathlon Range)

Episode summary

- At Fernie City Hall, teams had to sign up for one of two buses, the first carrying three teams and the second carrying four teams, to Canoe Meadows in Kananaskis Country, Alberta. Once there, teams had to paddle whitewater canoes three kilometres (1.9 mi) down the Kananaskis River in order to reach their next clue.
- As a result of re-entering The Amazing Race Canada, Jully & Kathy and Cassie & Jahmeek had to complete a Speed Bump; they had to inflate a whitewater canoe before they could continue racing.
- In this leg's first Roadblock, one team member had to secure a pack onto a simulated horse by tying a diamond hitch in order to receive their next clue.
- At the Trans Canada Trail, teams had to complete a sliding puzzle of a section of the trail in order to receive their next clue.
- In this leg's second Roadblock, the team member who did not perform the previous Roadblock had to complete an all-terrain slalom course within 105 seconds on an adaptive eBike in order to receive their next clue directing them to the Pit Stop: the biathlon range at the Canmore Nordic Centre.

Additional notes

- Catherine & Craig, Court & Ali, and Dennis & Durrell were removed from the competition due to COVID-19. As a result, Cassie & Jahmeek and Jully & Kathy re-entered the competition as replacement teams.
- 2022 Winter Paralympics gold medalist Mark Arendz appeared as the Pit Stop greeter for this leg.
- This was a non-elimination leg.

=== Leg 5 (Alberta → British Columbia) ===
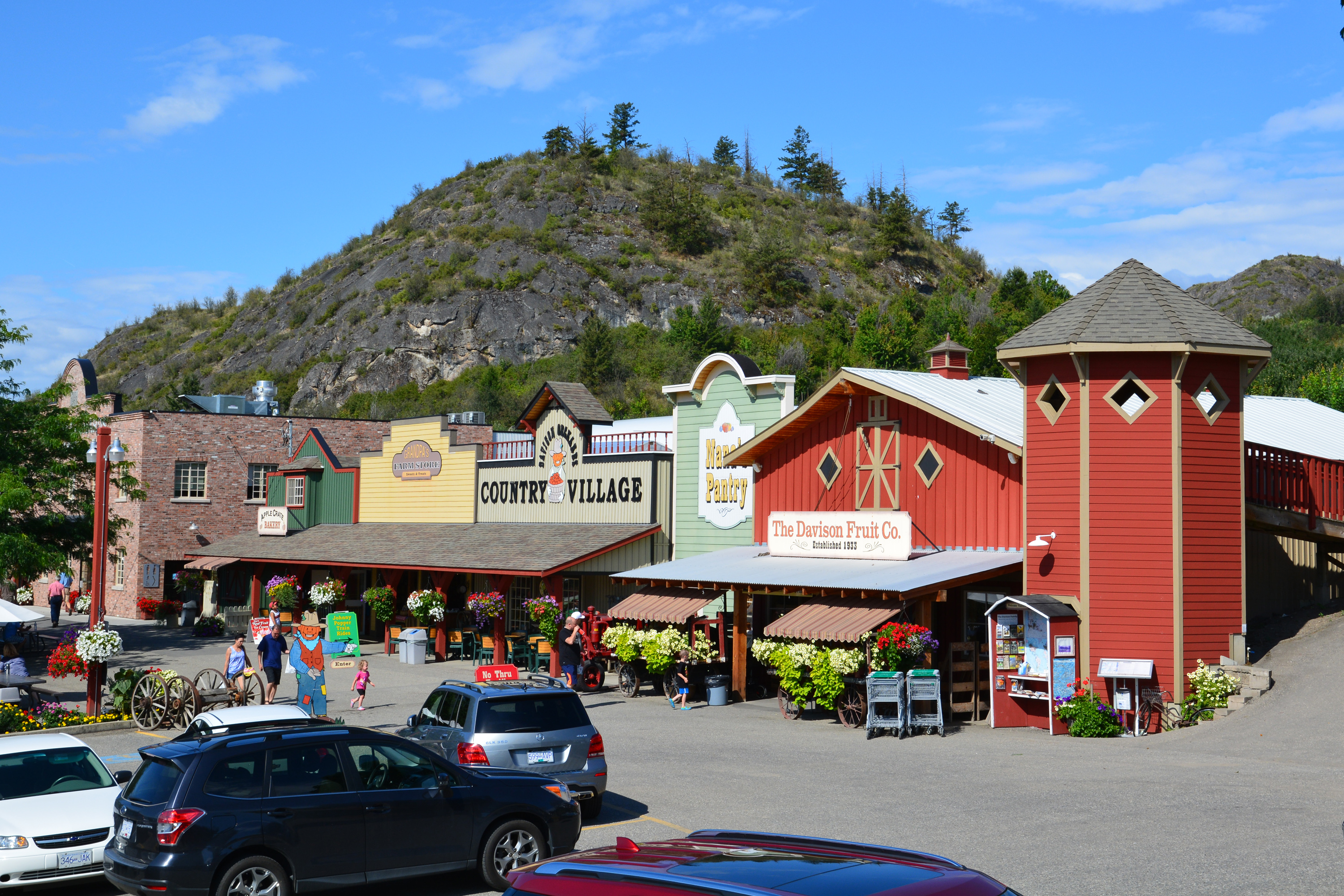
One Detour task in Vernon, British Columbia, had teams making apple pies.

- Episode 5: "I'm a Human Kite" (August 9, 2022)
- Prizes: A trip for two to London, England, and a $2,000 Marshalls gift card (awarded to Jesse & Marika)
- Eliminated: Jully & Kathy

Locations

- Canmore (Elevation Place)
- Calgary → Kelowna, British Columbia (Kelowna International Airport)
- Lumby (Freedom Flight School)
- Silver Star Provincial Park (Sovereign Lake Nordic Centre)
- Vernon (Vernon Lawn Bowling Club or Davison Orchards)
- Lake Country (Jealous Fruits Orchard)
- Vernon (Predator Ridge Resort – Yoga Platform)

Episode summary

- At the start of this leg, teams were instructed to fly to Kelowna, British Columbia. Once there, teams had to search the airport parking lot for a marked vehicle, which contained their next clue.
- In this leg's first Roadblock, one team member had perform a tandem paraglide above the Okanagan in order to receive their next clue.
- For their Speed Bump, Cassie & Jahmeek had to sort a pile of ski boots onto shelves by size and style before Cassie could attempt the second Roadblock.
- In this leg's second Roadblock, the team member who did not perform the previous Roadblock had to complete a biathlon by cross-country skiing around a 300-metre (980 ft) loop to a firing range and shoot five targets with five rounds in order to receive their next clue. If they missed any targets, they had to ski the loop again before attempting to shoot the remaining targets.
- This leg's Detour was a choice between Ball'n or Pomme'n. In Ball'n, teams had to score five points in a game of lawn bowling by rolling biased bowls closer to a jack than a pair of local competitors in order to receive their next clue. In Pomme'n, teams had to make five miniature apple pies by rolling out dough, slicing apples, and adding a pastry lattice top in order to receive their next clue.
- At Jealous Fruits Orchard, teams had to count the cherry trees within a marked area and then calculate the weight of the cherries that the trees would yield in order to receive their next clue directing them to the Pit Stop: the yoga platform at Predator Ridge Resort.

=== Leg 6 (British Columbia → Ontario) ===
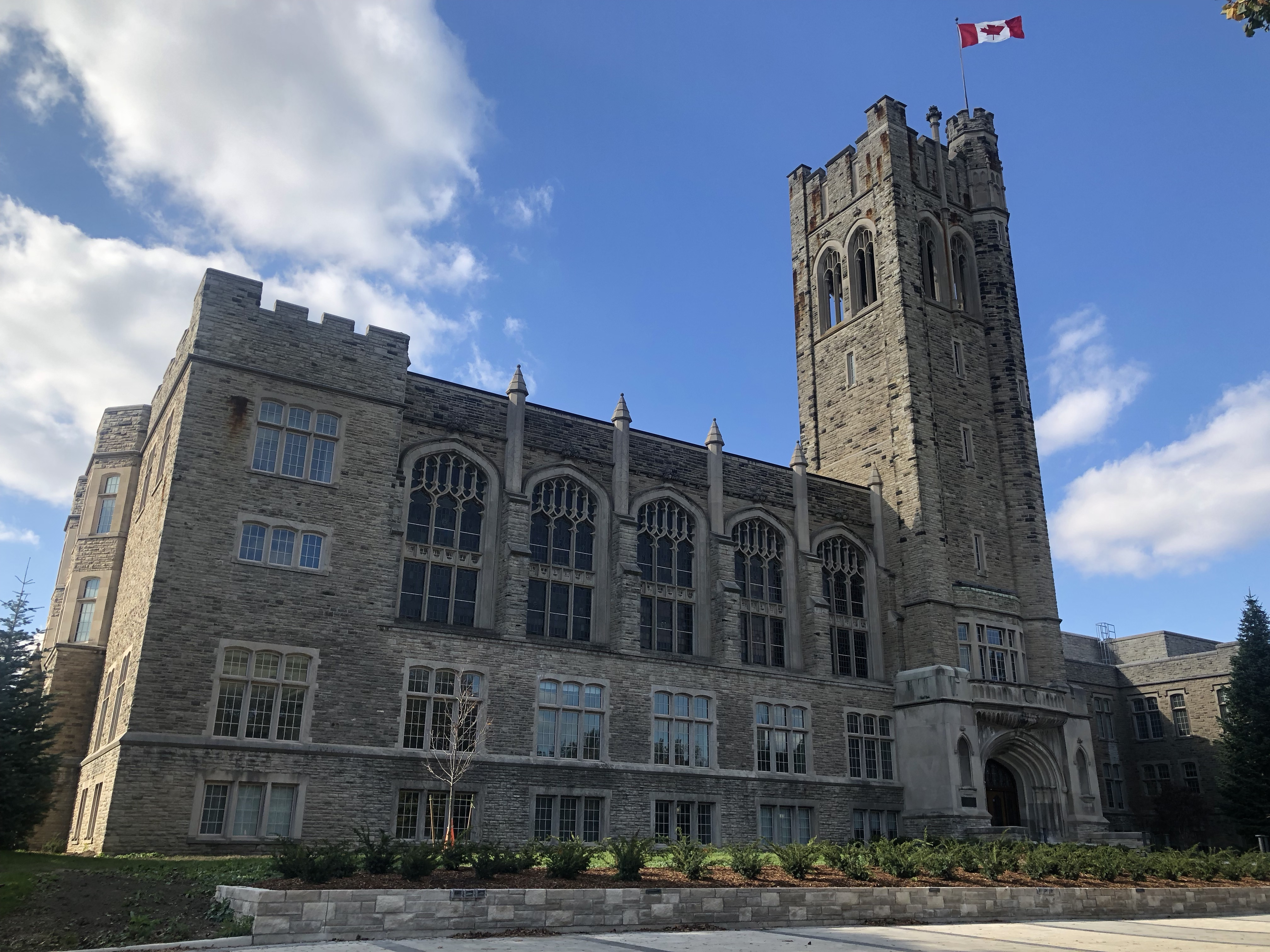
The campus of Western University was the site of the final task and Pit Stop in London, Ontario.

- Episode 6: "Racing for Our Lives" (August 16, 2022)
- Prizes: A trip for two to Honolulu, Hawaii, and a $1,500 Marshalls gift card (awarded to Franca & Nella)
- Eliminated: Dennis & Durrell

Locations

- Kelowna (Waterfront Park)
- Kelowna → Toronto, Ontario
- Toronto (Pearson Airport Station → Union Station)
- Toronto (Union Station → Dundas Station)
- Toronto (Marshalls − Yonge & Gerrard Streets)
- Toronto → London
- London (East Park Golf Gardens – 10th Fairway)
- London (Fanshawe College – Norton Wolf School of Aviation and Aerospace Technology or School of Digital and Performing Arts)
- London (Middlesex Agility Club)
- London (Western University – Western Interdisciplinary Research Building)
- London (Western University – Western Alumni Stadium)

Episode summary

- At the start of this leg, teams were instructed to fly to Toronto, Ontario. Once there, teams had to travel by train and subway to make their way to Marshalls, where teams had to study the photograph of an outfit and then search the store for four matching items, which had to cost less than $200, in order to receive their next clue.
- Teams were instructed to travel by train to London and make their way to the East Park Golf Gardens. There, teams found Jon, who informed them that two of the three teams who had been removed from the race due to COVID-19 would re-enter the competition after solving a riddle and finding an On Ramp pass in a well. Catherine & Craig and Court & Ali found the two On Ramp passes and were able to re-enter the competition.
- This leg's Detour was a choice between Aviate or Animate. In Aviate, teams had to attach a propeller to a Cessna 150 in order to receive their next clue. In Animate, one team member had to don a motion capture suit and recreate the movements of an animated movie starring Jon, without watching the movie, while their partner took on the role of director, in order to receive their next clue, Jesse & Marika used their Express Pass to bypass this Detour.
- In this leg's Roadblock, one team member had to lead a dog through a dog agility course within 45 seconds in order to receive their next clue.
- At the Western Interdisciplinary Research Building, teams had to don a Muse headband and meditate until they heard 30 birds chirps from the headband's app in order to receive their next clue, directing them to the Pit Stop at the Western Alumni Stadium.

Additional notes

- Dennis & Durrell failed to find one of the On Ramp passes and were eliminated from the race.
- There was no additional elimination at the end of this leg; all teams were instead instructed to continue racing.

=== Leg 7 (Ontario) ===
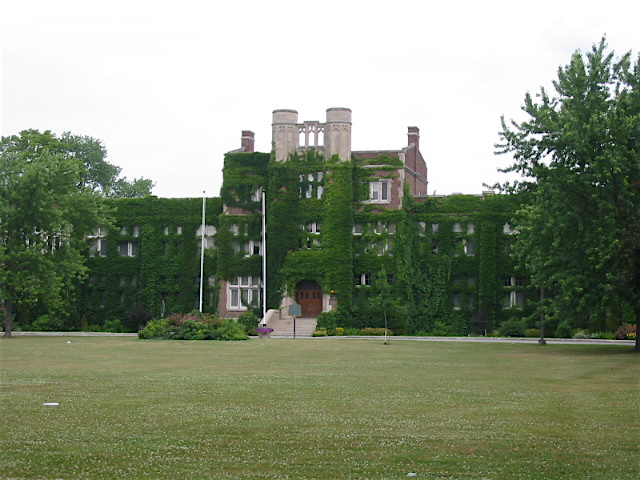
Teams learned American Sign Language at the Sir James Whitney School for the Deaf in Belleville, Ontario.

- Episode 7: "What the Duck Is Going On?" (August 23, 2022)
- Prizes: A trip for two to Geneva, Switzerland, and a $2,500 Marshalls gift card (awarded to Jesse & Marika)
- Eliminated: Cassie & Jahmeek and Cedric & Tychon

Locations

- London (Springbank Park) → Toronto (Downtown Toronto)
- Toronto → Belleville (Belleville Station)
- Prince Edward County (Macaulay Mountain Conservation Area – Birdhouse City)
- Picton (Prince Eddy's Brewing Company)
- Picton (Spark Box Studio or Savon Du Bois)
- Belleville (Sir James Whitney School for the Deaf)
- Sandbanks Provincial Park (Beach)

Episode summary

- At the start of this leg, teams had to sign up for one of two buses, each of which carried four teams, to Toronto. Once there, teams had to search the downtown area for one of two people wearing red hats who had tickets for one of two trains to Belleville, one carrying three teams and the other carrying five teams. Once there, teams found their next clue.
- In this leg's Roadblock, one team member had to choose an abstract map and fill in the names of fourteen birdhouses in order to receive their next clue.
- This leg's Detour was a choice between Press It or Push It. In Press It, teams had to replicate a message by arranging type pieces in reverse and then printing out the message on a printing press in order to receive their next clue. In Push It, one team member had to sit in a tub and relay instructions to their partner to make 15 working bath bombs in order to receive their next clue.
- At the Sir James Whitney School for the Deaf, one team member was taught how to sign the name of the school's first deaf professor, while their partner memorized the American manual alphabet. Once the latter team member could identify the name SAMUEL GREENE, teams received their next clue directing them to the Pit Stop: the beach at Sandbanks Provincial Park. Franca & Nella and Brendan & Connor used their Express Passes to bypass this task.

Additional notes

- Franca & Nelia used the Pass against Beverly & Veronica.
- This leg featured a double elimination; the last two teams to arrive at the Pit Stop were eliminated.

=== Leg 8 (Ontario & Quebec) ===
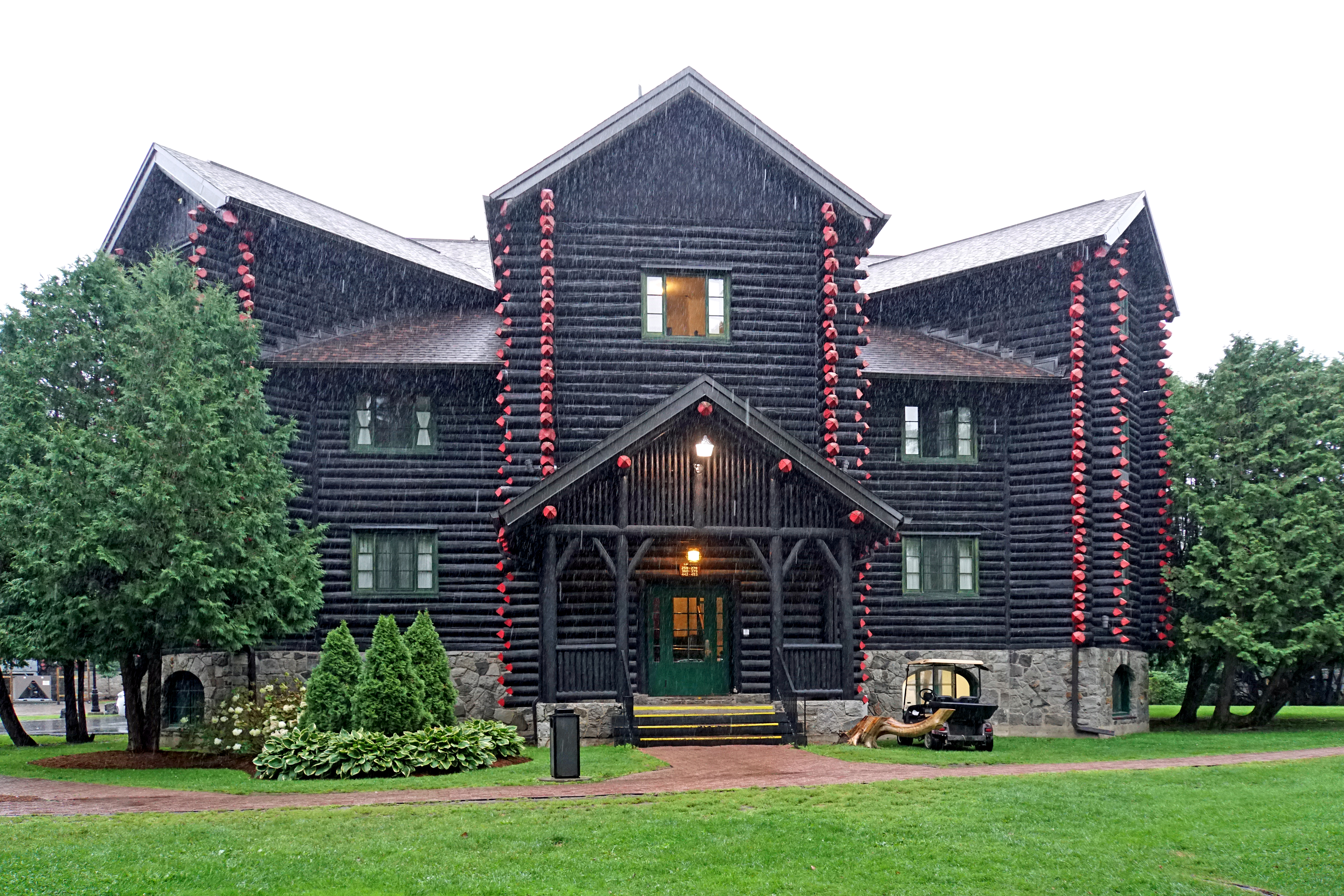
Teams encountered their first Face Off at Fairmont Le Château Montebello in Montebello, Quebec.

- Episode 8: "Give Me a Moustache and Call Me Sherlock Holmes" (August 30, 2022)
- Prizes: A trip for two to Istanbul, Turkey, and a $2,000 Marshalls gift card (awarded to Jesse & Marika)

Locations

- Belleville (Zwick Island)
- Belleville → Ottawa (Ottawa Station)
- Gatineau, Quebec (Canadian Museum of History)
- Ottawa, Ontario (Canada Aviation and Space Museum)
- Ottawa → Gatineau, Quebec
- Montebello (Fairmont Le Château Montebello)
- Montebello (Le Petit Château B&B)
- Montebello (Manoir Papineau)

Episode summary

- At the start of this leg, teams were instructed to travel by train to Ottawa. Once there, teams had to search the parking lot of the train station for a marked vehicle, which contained their next clue, which directed them to drive to the Canadian Museum of History in Gatineau, Quebec. Teams had to search through a collection of 3,000 stamps in the museum to find the postage cost of 13 stamps provided to them in order to receive their next clue.
- In this leg's Roadblock, teams had to search the Canadian Museum of History for the de Havilland Canada DHC-2 Beaver and retrieve a ticket for a flight on a vintage biplane, where one team member had to spot a 40-foot (12 m) letter M in order to receive their next clue.
- Following the Roadblock, teams had to travel by ferry across the Ottawa River and use their car's GPS to navigate to their next destination.
- For this season's first Face Off, two teams had to compete against each other in a game of croquet. The first team to clear two balls through a series of wickets and hit the centre peg received their next clue, while the losing team had to wait for another team. The last team remaining at the Face Off had to turn over an hourglass and wait out a time penalty before moving on.
- In Montebello, teams had to solve a murder mystery by locating and interviewing six witnesses, who gave their statements in Québécois French, in order to receive their next clue from the inspector. Teams then had to check in at the Pit Stop: Manoir Papineau.

Additional note

- This was a non-elimination leg.

=== Leg 9 (Ontario → New Brunswick) ===
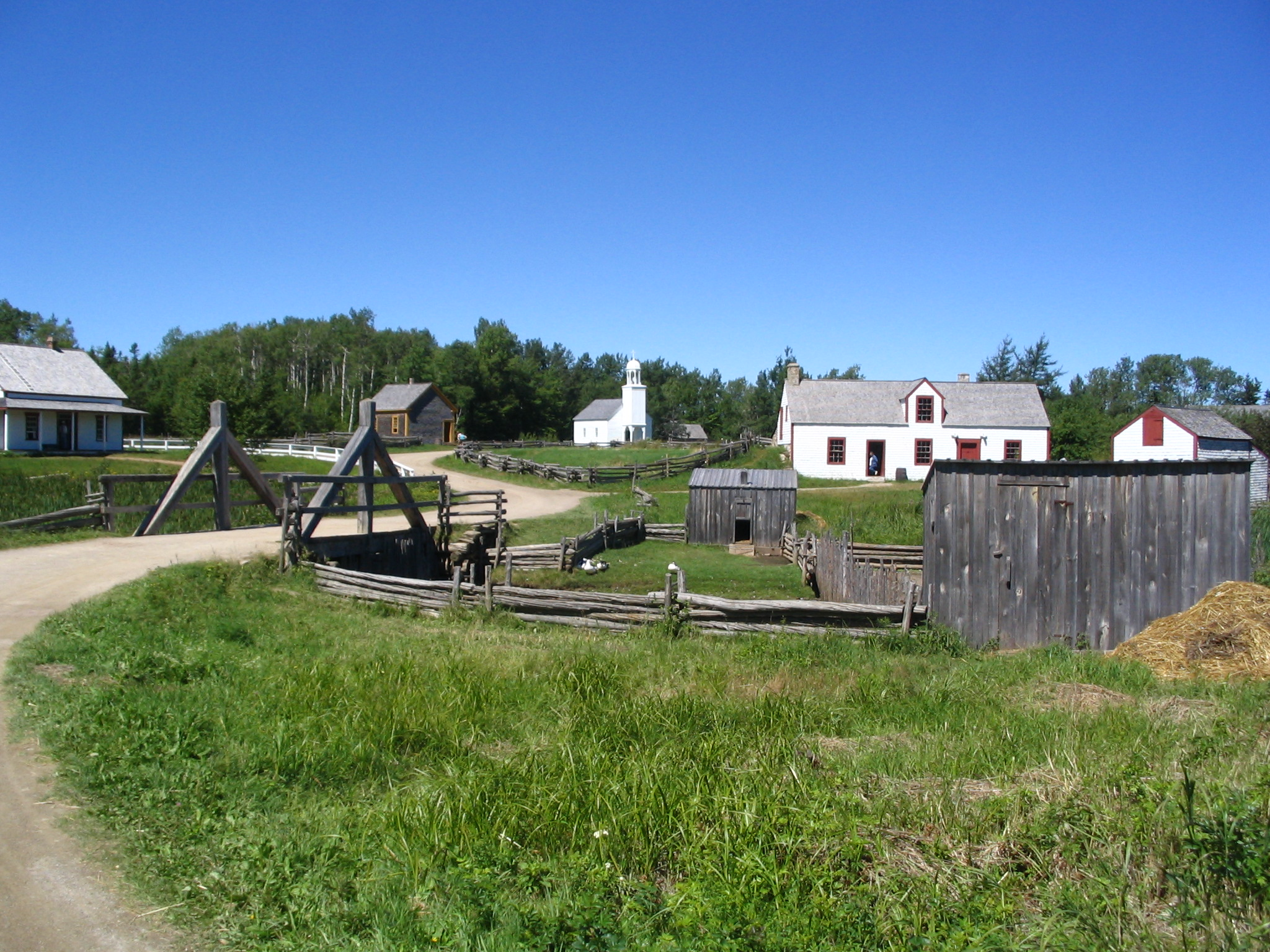
During the leg in the Acadian Peninsula, teams visited the Village Historique Acadien.

- Episode 9: "I Love You. I Know." (September 6, 2022)
- Prizes: A trip for two to Mexico City, Mexico; 250,000 Expedia rewards points each; and a $2,500 Marshalls gift card (awarded to Catherine & Craig)
- Eliminated: Court & Ali

Locations

- Ottawa, Ontario (Wellington Street)
- Ottawa → Bathurst, New Brunswick
- Bathurst (Frostbites Dairy Bar)
- Caraquet (La Brôkerie)
- Bertrand (Village Historique Acadien)
- Haut-Shippagan (Cielo)
- Pokeshaw (Pokeshaw Rock)

Episode summary

- At the start of this leg, teams were instructed to fly to Bathurst, New Brunswick. Once there, teams had to travel to Frostbites Dairy Bar, where they received ice cream cones and their next clue. Teams were instructed to load their trucks with plywood, a lobster trap, and two chairs, which they would need during the leg, in order to receive their next clue.
- In this leg's Roadblock, one team member had to perform an Acadian stepdance in order to receive their next clue.
- At the Village Historique Acadien, teams had to dress in 17th century clothing and wooden clogs, and fill a water barrel using a yoke and two small buckets in order to receive their next clue.
- For their Speed Bump, Brendan & Connor had to use traditional couvreur tools to make 50 roof shingles before they could continue racing.
- This season's final Detour was choice between Oyster Shuck or Clean & Tuck. In Oyster Shuck, teams had to delicately shuck open 24 oysters and then replicate two oyster platters in order to receive their next clue. In Clean & Tuck, teams had to clean a glamping dome such that it matched an example in order to receive their next clue.
- After the Detour, teams had to check in at the Pit Stop: Pokeshaw Rock.

=== Leg 10 (New Brunswick → Ontario) ===
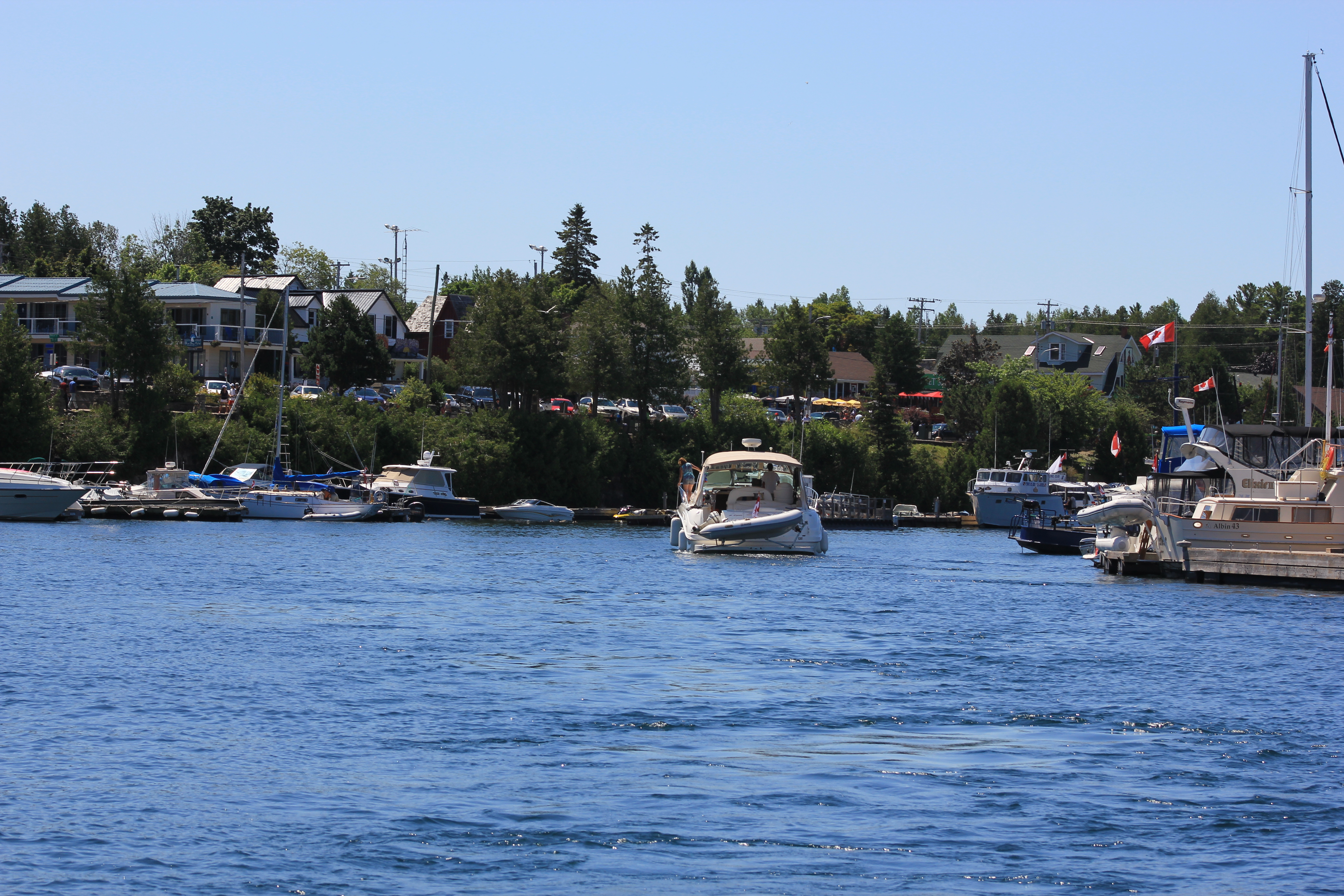
After arriving in Tobermory, racers drove in the town's harbour.

- Episode 10: "Is that a Wild Peacock?" (September 13, 2022)
- Prizes: A trip for two to Auckland, New Zealand, and a $3,500 Marshalls gift card (awarded to Brendan & Connor)
- Eliminated: Beverley & Veronica

Locations

- Bathurst (Bathurst Basin)
- Bathurst → Toronto, Ontario
- Bowmanville (Canadian Tire Motorsport Park)
- Oshawa (Oshawa Executive Airport) → Tobermory (Georgian Bay)
- Tobermory (Divers Den)
- Wiarton (Lloyd's Smoke Shop & Pool Hall)
- Meaford (CFB Meaford)
- Georgian Bluffs (The Inn at Cobble Beach – Lighthouse)

Episode summary

- At the start of this leg, teams were instructed to fly to Toronto, Ontario. Once there, they had to travel to the Canadian Tire Motorsport Park in order to receive their next clue.
- In this leg's Roadblock, one team member had to drive a sports car through a three-kilometre (1.9 mi) precision driving course within 150 seconds in order to receive their next clue.
- After the Roadblock, teams had to drive to Oshawa Executive Airport, where they signed up for one of three floatplanes to Tobermory, the first of which carried one team and the other two carried two teams. At Divers Den, one team member had to follow a series of buoys and swim to four shipwreck known as the Tugs, find four numbers, and relay the numbers to their partner, who had to use them to unlock a treasure chest containing keys to a marked vehicle that contained their next clue.
- For this season's second and final Face Off, two teams had to compete against each other in a game of snooker. The team who scored more points would receive their next clue, while the losing team had to wait for another team. The last team remaining at the Face Off had to turn over an hourglass and wait out a time penalty before moving on.
- At CFB Meaford, teams had to run through an obstacle course while a training officer listed the 4th Canadian Division's seven critical military values, which they had to repeat in order to receive their next clue. Teams then had to check in at the Pit Stop: the lighthouse at The Inn at Cobble Beach in Georgian Bluffs.

=== Leg 11 (Ontario → British Columbia) ===
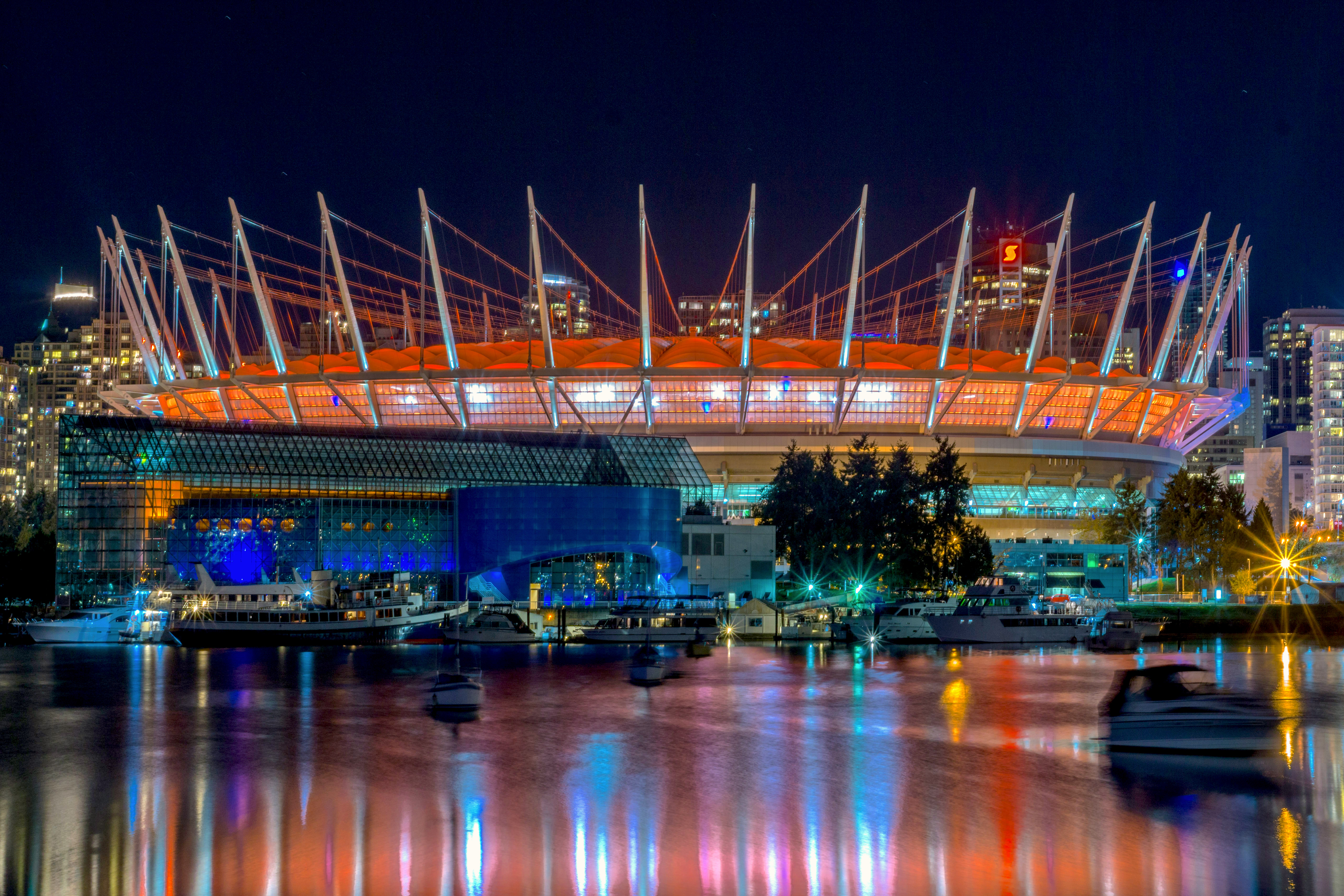
BC Place hosted of the finish line for The Amazing Race Canada 8.

- Episode 11: "Where Is Gurmail?" (September 20, 2022)
- Prizes: A CA$250,000 cash payout, a trip for two around the world, and a 2022 Chevrolet Silverado ZR2 for each team member (awarded to Catherine & Craig)
- Winners: Catherine & Craig
- Runners-up: Jesse & Marika
- Third place: Franca & Nella
- Fourth place: Brendan & Connor

Locations

- Georgian Bluffs (The Inn at Cobble Beach – Lighthouse)
- Toronto → Vancouver, British Columbia
- Vancouver (Cardero Park)
- Vancouver (Vancouver Harbour Heliport) → West Vancouver (Caulfeild Cove)
- North Vancouver (Wallace Shipyards)
- Vancouver (University of British Columbia – Old Auditorium)
- Richmond (Richmond Night Market)
- Vancouver (Vancouver Public Library Central Branch)
- Vancouver (BC Place)

Episode summary

- At the start of this leg, teams were instructed to fly to Vancouver, British Columbia. Once there, teams had to travel to Cardero Park in order to find their next clue.
- In this leg's first Roadblock, teams had to travel by helicopter to Caulfeild Cove in West Vancouver. There, one team member had to don a wetsuit, jump 20 feet (6.1 m) from the helicopter, and swim to a buoy, where they found their next clue.
- In this season's final Roadblock, the team member who did not perform the previous Roadblock had to don roller skates and complete an obstacle course within 75 seconds in order to receive their next clue.
- At the old auditorium of the University of British Columbia, teams had to sing the Italian lyrics to the "Libiamo ne' lieti calici" (from Verdi's La traviata) in order to receive their next clue. Teams were then directed to the Richmond Night Market, where they had to purchase ten food orders from ten different vendors in order to receive their next clue.
- At the Vancouver Public Library Central Branch, teams had to place 27 riddles describing challenges that they had completed during the race beneath the locations where the tasks occurred and in chronological order in order to receive their final clue, which directed them to the finish line at BC Place.

== Ratings ==
No.	Title	Air date	Viewers (millions)	Weekly rank	Ref.
1	"Come on Doodlebug"	July 5, 2022	1.70	1	
2	"Goatageddon"	July 12, 2022	1.59	1	
3	"We Love Weenies!"	July 19, 2022	1.77	1	
4	"Feel the Fear and Do It Anyways"	July 26, 2022	1.40	1	
5	"I'm a Human Kite"	August 9, 2022	1.60	1	
6	"Racing for Our Lives"	August 16, 2022	1.75	1	
7	"What the Duck Is Going On?"	August 23, 2022	1.54	1	

- No episode aired on August 2 following Civic Holiday; CTV instead aired a rebroadcast of The 4th Annual Howie Mandel Stand-Up Extravaganza.
- No ratings data was provided by Numeris following August 28, 2022.
