= Pittsburgh Civic Light Opera =

Nonprofit professional theater company in Pennsylvania, USA

- Pittsburgh Civic Light Opera logo
- Formation: February 2, 1946
- Dissolved: 2026
- Type: light opera/musical theatre company
- Location: Pittsburgh, Pennsylvania

Pittsburgh Civic Light Opera (Pittsburgh CLO) was a nonprofit professional theater company based in the Cultural District of Downtown Pittsburgh, Pennsylvania, USA. Despite its name, the organization presents musical theatre classics rather than opera; although it does occasionally stage operettas. Its productions draw more than 200,000 patrons each year and its annual budget is nearly $10 million.

Established on 20 February 1946, it premiered at Pitt Stadium on 3 June 1946, where it offered outdoor performances until 1958. In 1961, the Civic Arena, was built to house the CLO. The arena, the former home of the Pittsburgh Hornets (AHL, 1961–67) and the Pittsburgh Penguins (NHL, 1967-2010) hockey franchises, was covered by the world's first retractable roof, designed so that audiences might enjoy theater under the stars. In 1973 the company moved to the newly renovated former Penn Theatre that was now called Heinz Hall. The company moved to the Benedum Center in 1988. CLO opened its newest venue in 2004, The CLO Cabaret at Theater Square.

Pittsburgh CLO's history began when Abraham Lewis Wolk, a Pittsburgh City Councilman, attended a performance of the St. Louis Municipal Opera, the first American summertime musical theater. Wolk wanted to copy the idea, and after discussions with Pittsburgh retail magnate Edgar J. Kaufmann, who helped with financing, Pittsburgh CLO was established.

Since 1946, Pittsburgh CLO has been dedicated to the preservation, creation and promotion of live musical theater. Pittsburgh CLO produces a Main Stage Season, A Musical Christmas Carol and operates the CLO Cabaret. Programs include the Academy, Mini Stars, the Richard Rodgers Award, the Construction Center for the Arts and is a partner in Elephant Eye Theatricals. National touring includes Doctor Dolittle, Barry Manilow’s Copacabana and Joseph and the Amazing Technicolor Dreamcoat.

Pittsburgh CLO has participated in a number of Broadway shows, including Legally Blonde, Curtains, Monty Python's Spamalot, The Color Purple, Chita Rivera: The Dancer's Life, Thoroughly Modern Millie, Bombay Dreams, Flower Drum Song and Big River. The musical director for several of these was Sue Anderson. Tom Helm served as the Pittsburgh CLO's long time music director from 1997 to 2016 after having earlier served in that post in 1981-1982.

Pittsburgh CLO's numerous programs for students include the Gene Kelly Awards, founded in 1990.

In 2004, the Pittsburgh CLO produced The Music Man, featuring Jeff Goldblum as Harold Hill, alongside his then-girlfriend, Catherine Wreford, Illeana Douglas, and Ed Begley, Jr. This production was later made the centerpiece of mockumentary/documentary Pittsburgh.

In 2026, the Pittsburgh CLO merged with the Pittsburgh Public Theater, forming a yet-to-be-named arts organization.

== See also ==
- Theatre in Pittsburgh
