= Tom Helm (conductor) =

Thomas Lynn Helm, better known as Tom Helm, (June 16, 1952 – August 11, 2023) was an American conductor and orchestrator who primarily worked as a director of musical theatre and light opera. A native of Smithville, Missouri, he trained as a pianist at the University of Missouri–Kansas City. He began his career as a musical director with the Kansas City Repertory Theatre in 1974–1975. After this he moved to New York City where he first worked on the music staff of the Equity Library Theater. On Broadway he conducted several musicals during 1980s and 1990s; including Brigadoon, Cats, Me and My Girl, and Les Misérables.

Helm worked for more than twenty years as a conductor for the Paper Mill Playhouse where he was musical director for more than forty productions. One of these included a landmark 1998 production of Stephen Sondheim's Follies which the composer described as the first staging of the musical to present the work's complete score. He also led a 1999 Paper Mill production of Crazy for You which was filmed for national broadcast on PBS's Great Performances. His orchestrations for Paper Mill's 2005 production of Rodgers and Hammerstein's Cinderella were later published by the Rodgers & Hammerstein Organization in 2008.

Helm was music director of the Pittsburgh Civic Light Opera (PCLO) from 1981 to 1982 and again from 1997 to 2016. The PCLO's 2004 production of The Music Man starring Jeff Goldblum as Harold Hill was the backdrop for the 2006 mockumentary film Pittsburgh. Helm was one of several PCLO artists featured in this movie.

== Early life in Missouri ==
The son of Thomas Helm and Dorothy Helm (née Greer), Thomas Lynn Helm was born in Missouri on June 16, 1952. Raised in Smithville, Missouri, Helm graduated from Smithville High School in 1970. He trained as a pianist under Joanne Baker at the University of Missouri–Kansas City where he graduated with a degree in piano performance.

Helm began his career at the Kansas City Repertory Theatre (KCRT) in 1974 as the music director for a production of Anna Cora Mowatt's Fashion; or, Life in New York. This production toured to the Kennedy Center in Washington D.C. in 1975. He composed music for KCRT's 1975 production of Tennessee Williams's A Streetcar Named Desire which starred Meg Myles as Blanche, Steve Ryan as Stanley, and Maria Frumkin as Stella. His original score was used to underscore the pathos of the more emotionally charged scenes in the play.

== New York career and work in regional theatre ==
=== Early work ===
Helm moved from Missouri to New York City where he began his career working on the staff of the Equity Library Theater. In 1979 he was music director for a production of Side by Side by Sondheim at the Hangar Theatre in Ithaca, New York. That same year he was music director for productions of Brigadoon at the Darien Dinner Theatre in Connecticut and Carnival! at the Lakewood Theater in Madison, Maine. In 1980 he was music director for a production of My Fair Lady at the Coachlight Dinner Theatre in East Windsor, Connecticut that starred Edward Mulhare as Professor Higgins and Anne Rogers as Eliza Doolittle.

=== Broadway and work on the national stage ===
Helm made his Broadway debut on the conducting staff of the 1980-1981 revival of Brigadoon. In 1983 he was musical director of the original production of Wally Harper's 5-6-7-8...Dance! at Radio City Music Hall which starred The Rockettes. After this he served as the original musical director for the first national tour of Andrew Lloyd Webber's Cats. Just prior to the beginning of this tour in Los Angeles he had served as the musical director of the Broadway production of Cats in 1983.

In 1986 Helm returned to Broadway as part of the music staff of Noel Gay's Me and My Girl; serving as Associate Musical Director under Stanley Lebowsky. In 1988 he was music director of the national tour of Me and My Girl which starred Tim Curry and Donna Bullock. He succeeded Lebowsky as musical director of the Broadway production, with Sue Anderson as his assistant conductor. He remained with this show through the end of its run in 1989.

In 1991 Helm was the conductor for an Off-Broadway production of Howard Marren's What About Luv? at the York Theatre. He worked as one of the conductors of the Broadway production of Les Misérables; serving as music director for the production from 1993-1996. He served as music director for the original production of Skip Kennon and Jack Viertel's musical Time and Again which premiered at the Old Globe Theatre in San Diego in 1996. In 2006 he was music supervisor for the Broadway production of Souvenir which starred Judy Kaye as the notoriously bad amateur soprano Florence Foster Jenkins.

=== Pittsburgh Civic Light Opera ===
Helm was musical director of the Pittsburgh Civic Light Opera (PCLO) in the summers of 1981 and 1982. He was appointed to the role after the unexpected departure of conductor Jack Holmes who had served as PCLO director for the previous five seasons. Susan H. Schulman became the resident stage director of the PCLO at the same time that Helm assumed his post as music director. In his first season with the company, the 35th season for PCLO, he conducted productions of Mame, Cinderella, Annie Get Your Gun, The Sound of Music, The Vagabond King, and Seesaw. In the summer of 1982 he led performances of South Pacific, Promises, Promises, The Student Prince, Kiss Me, Kate, Carnival!, and Brigadoon. In 1983 Jack Gaughan succeeded him as the PCLO's musical director with Helm resigning due to his obligation as conductor for the Broadway production of Cats.

Helm returned to the post of PCLO musical director from 1997 through 2016. Some of the productions he led at the PCLO included a 1998 production of Camelot starring Noel Harrison as King Arthur; a 2000 production of Evita with Chris Diamantopoulos as Che Guevara; a 2000 production of Anything Goes starring Carolee Carmello as Reno Sweeney; a 2003 staging of My Fair Lady with Charles Shaughnessy as Professor Higgins and Glory Crampton as Eliza Doolittle; a 2005 production of A Little Night Music with Dee Hoty as Desiree Armfeldt and Stephen Bogardus as Fredrik; a 2009 production of Les Misérables with Jacquelyn Piro Donovan as Fantine and Robert Cuccioli as Javert; and a 2009 production of Into the Woods with Beth Leavel as the Witch. He also conducted a 2004 production of The Music Man starring Jeff Goldblum as Harold Hill and Catherine Wreford as Marian Paroo; a production which was featured in the mockumentary film Pittsburgh in which Helm was featured.

In 2010 Helm conducted the PCLO productions of Miss Saigon, The Producers, Hairspray, The Student Prince, and Curtains. Later PCLO productions he conducted included a 2011 production of Jekyll & Hyde with Kevin Gray in the title role and Elizabeth Stanley as Lucy; a 2012 production of Sunset Boulevard starring Liz Callaway as Norma Desmond; a 2013 production of Phantom starring Erin Mackey as Christine; a 2014 production of Singin' in the Rain starring Mary Michael Patterson as Kathy Selden; a 2015 production of Gypsy starring Kim Zimmer as Mama Rose; and a 2015 production of The Wedding Singer with Jenna Ushkowitz as Julia. His final season at PCLO included a 2016 production of Damn Yankees with John Bolton as the demonic Mr. Applegate.

=== Paper Mill Playhouse ===
Helm worked on the conducting staff of the Paper Mill Playhouse in New Jersey; beginning with a position of music director of the PMP's 1990 production of Mikado, Inc.; an original PMP adaptation of Gilbert and Sullivan's The Mikado which reset the work in contemporary New Jersey using a new book by Jane Waterhouse and new music arrangements by Glen Kelly. Later that year he led PMP productions of Me and My Girl and The Roar of the Greasepaint – The Smell of the Crowd. Other early PMP shows he served as music director for included Oklahoma! (1992), Phantom (1993), and My Fair Lady (1993). In 1998 he was music director of PMP's landmark production of Stephen Sondheim's Follies; a production which Sondheim described as the first staging to present the musical's complete score. He also assisted in the recording of this production; although he did not conduct the recording which was led by the original orchestrator of Follies, Jonathan Tunick.

In 1999 Helm was musical director of PMP's production of Crazy for You which was filmed for national broadcast on the PBS television program Great Performances. In 2002 he was music director for the PMP staging of Annie which was mounted to celebrate the 25th anniversary of the musical with Sarah Hyland in the title role, and in 2004 he was music director for the PMP revival of George and Ira Gershwin's Of Thee I Sing which used a new staging by Tina Landau that was partly a satire of the 2004 United States presidential campaigns of George W. Bush and John Kerry.

In 2005 Helm was music director for the PMP production of Rodgers and Hammerstein's Cinderella (2005). His updated orchestrations for this musical, adapted from the original by Robert Russell Bennett, were published by the Rodgers & Hammerstein Organization in 2008. He also served as music director for PMP productions of The Student Prince (2000), The King and I (2002), Camelot (2003), Guys and Dolls (2004), She Loves Me (2004), A Wonderful Life (2006), Seven Brides for Seven Brothers (2007), On the Town (2009), Smokey Joe's Cafe (2010), Curtains (2011), The Sound of Music (2012), and Lend Me a Tenor (2013) among others. At the time of the latter production it was reported that he had conducted more than 40 shows for PMP.

=== Other work ===
In 1991 Helm served as Meg Bussert's accompanist in her cabaret act September Song which she performed at Syracuse Stage.

== Death ==
Helm died at the age of 71 in New York City on August 11, 2023.
