= Marika Sila =

Canadian Inuk performer and activist

- Born: March 18, 1992 (age 33); Yellowknife, Northwest Territories
- Occupations: actress, content creator, social activist
- Family: Jesse Cockney

Marika Sila (born March 18, 1992) is a Canadian Inuvialuk actress, content creator, and social activist. Born in Yellowknife, Northwest Territories, her family (originally from Tuktoyaktuk) moved to Canmore, Alberta when she was five years old. Olympic cross-country skier Jesse Cockney is her older brother.

== Film and television ==
Sila focuses on roles which she feels portray Indigenous people in a positive way, saying that her acting career serves to "build a platform so I can speak about important Indigenous rights issues and climate issues." Her first major acting role was in a 2019 episode of The Twilight Zone, "A Traveler," where she portrayed an Inuk police officer. Sila next appeared as a police officer in four episodes of Canadian police procedural series Tribal in 2020. Her lead performance as an Inuk paramedic in Canadian horror film Ditched (2022) was well-received, with one reviewer calling her "reason enough to stick with the story."

In March 2022, she announced that she was producing and directing a documentary about the reaction of Inuit elders and community leaders to the bodies discovered at former residential schools. The documentary will be titled What's Next? On Canada's RedPath to Reconciliation.

In September 2022, Sila and her brother Jesse competed in The Amazing Race Canada 8, and came in second place.

== Other ventures ==
Sila's TikTok has over 364,000 followers as of April 2023. She began posting on TikTok in April 2020 at the beginning of the COVID-19 pandemic in Canada. Her content is a mixture of education about Inuit culture and social issues; social activism relating to missing and murdered Indigenous women, the Canadian Indian residential school system, and the bodies of children buried at the schools; and stunt performances, including hoop dancing, fire spinning, and weapons handling.

In 2021, Sila launched RedPath Radio, a podcast aimed at preserving and sharing Indigenous cultural knowledge and stories. She is also the owner of RedPath Talent, an entertainment and talent management agency focused on Indigenous performers.

Sila has also appeared as a model. In 2020, she was a quarterfinalist in the Maxim Cover Girl contest. In 2022, she was a model for the third iteration of Project Atigi, a capsule collection created by Inuk designer Victoria Kakuktinniq for winterwear brand Canada Goose.

== Filmography ==
| Year | Title | Role | Notes | Ref |
|---|---|---|---|---|
| 2016 | Lucifer | Barfing Girl | Episode "The Would-Be Prince of Darkness" | |
| 2019 | The Twilight Zone | Sergeant Yuka Mongoyak | Episode "A Traveler" | |
| 2020 | Tribal | Justine Trueblood | 4 episodes | |
| 2021 | The Secret History of: The Wild West | Young Blackfoot Woman | Episode "Louder than Words" | |
| 2021 | Hudson & Rex | Veena Kalvak | Episode "Fanning the Flames" | |
| 2021 | Ditched | Melina | | |
| 2022 | The Amazing Race Canada 8 | Self/Contestant | Competed with brother Jesse Cockney | |
| 2023 | Finality of Dusk | Ishkode | | |
