= Pittsburgh (2006 film) =

- DVD cover
- Directed by: Chris Bradley; Kyle LaBrache
- Produced by: Bernie Cahill; Patrick Bradley; Ryan Magnussen
- Starring: Jeff Goldblum; Illeana Douglas; Ed Begley Jr. Moby
- Music by: David Gregory Byrne
- Production companies: Roar; Prosperity Pictures
- Release dates: April 2006 (Tribeca); September 18, 2007 (United States)
- Running time: 84 minutes
- Country: United States
- Language: English

Pittsburgh is a 2006 mockumentary comedy film that follows American actor Jeff Goldblum as he attempts to secure a green card for his Canadian actor/singer/dancer girlfriend Catherine Wreford by appearing with her as the leads in a summer stock theatre production of The Music Man in Goldblum's hometown of Pittsburgh, Pennsylvania.

The film features numerous other famous personalities portraying themselves, including Ed Begley Jr., Illeana Douglas, Moby, Conan O'Brien, Craig Kilborn, Alanis Morissette, and Tom Cavanagh.

Though some of the primary events of the story took place (for example, Goldblum did perform The Music Man with the Pittsburgh Civic Light Opera at the Benedum Center, though that performance was staged solely for the film) "Pittsburgh" was, with a few improvisational flourishes, totally scripted. Many of the deleted scenes included on the DVD release of the film are far more overtly comic than those the filmmakers chose to include in the finished product and make the fictional nature of the project more obvious.

== Cast ==
- Jeff Goldblum as himself
- Conan O'Brien as himself
- Catherine Wreford as herself
- Ed Begley Jr. as himself
- Illeana Douglas as herself
- Moby as himself
- Craig Kilborn as himself
- Alanis Morissette as herself
- Tom Cavanagh as himself
- Jon Clunies as himself playing Ewart Dunlop in the Music Man
- Flanzinee as himself
- Tom Helm as himself
