= Ditched (film) =

- Directed by: Christopher Donaldson
- Written by: Christopher Donaldson; Neil Every
- Produced by: Mark Sommer
- Starring: Marika Sila; Mackenzie Gray; J. Lindsay Robinson; Kris Loranger
- Cinematography: Wes Miron
- Edited by: Carey Komadina
- Music by: Clayton Worbeck
- Production company: Shadowbrook Pictures
- Distributed by: Epic Pictures Group; Dread Central Presents
- Release dates: 14 August 2021 (Popcorn Frights Film Festival); 18 January 2022 (Canada)
- Running time: 86 minutes
- Country: Canada
- Language: English

Ditched is a 2021 Canadian horror film directed by Christopher Donaldson, starring Marika Sila, Mackenzie Gray, J. Lindsay Robinson and Kris Loranger.

== Plot ==
An ambulance transferring dangerous convicts crashes in the middle of nowhere. It soon becomes clear that the crash was no accident, and the survivors are being stalked by a killer. Just 30 feet to the road, but will anyone reach it alive?

== Cast ==
- Marika Sila as Melina
- Kris Loranger as Franson
- Lee Lopez as Aiden
- Declan O'Reilly as Jake
- J. Lindsay Robinson as Officer Revesz
- Reamonn Joshee as Sideburns
- Lara Taillon as Officer Kerrs
- Lianna Makuch as Glynnis
- Tom Lim as Ghillie Man
- Mackenzie Gray as Caine

== Release ==
The film was released to Video on Demand on 18 January 2022, and on Blu-ray on 15 February.

== Reception ==
Phil Wheat of Nerdly rated the film 3.5 stars out of 5, calling it an "interesting take on familiar themes, with some superb visuals (the lighting used is a particular highlight) and a fantastic synth soundtrack that adds a lot to the film’s atmosphere; and a denouement that made one hell of an impact!". Chris Knight of the National Post rated the film 2.5 stars out of 5, writing that "it feels like Ditched suffers from reverse Jaws syndrome", and that "Here, the furry monsters seem to be all over the place, all the time. Their motivation, when revealed, opens another can of worms", while praising the performances of Sila and Grey. The film received a rating of 2 out of 5 in Horror Society. Michael Talbot-Haynes of Film Threat gave it a rating of 9 out of 10 praising that it is "the most accomplished vision of a figurative Hell yet captured in cinema". While also commenting on Director Christopher Donaldson's inspiration from John Carpenter: "In the end credits, Donaldson mentions dozens of filmmakers who inspired Ditched. The director from that list whose influence is most apparent is John Carpenter. Some of this is due to the excellent synth-heavy score by Clayton Worbeck. However, Carpenter’s thumbprints are all over the Assault on Precinct 13 siege set up in the woods. Also, the visuals of the lurking dark hairy shapes echo The Fog".
