= Sue Anderson (musician) =

American pianist and conductor (1954–2025)

- Born: May 27, 1954; Frederic, Wisconsin
- Died: May 1, 2025 (aged 70)
- Occupations: pianist and conductor

Susan M. Anderson (May 27, 1954 – May 1, 2025) was an American pianist and conductor who performed on Broadway, toured, and made recordings. Anderson was one of the first female music directors on Broadway. Her career also included national tours, regional theatre, including the Pittsburgh Civic Light Opera, conducting Pops performances with various orchestras, and recording, sometimes with her husband, Cris Groenendaal. She performed often with youth groups, including at Carnegie Hall.

== Early life and education ==
Anderson was born in Frederic, Wisconsin, to Maynard and Alice Anderson, who owned and operated a small grocery store there. Both she and her sister studied piano and organ from an early age, and she performed at school and at her family's church. She graduated from Frederic High School.

Anderson graduated, with majors in music and business, from the University of Wisconsin–Eau Claire (UWEC). She accompanied a UWEC's men's chorus, the Singing Statesman, vocal recitals, and opera and musicals performed at UWEC. In 1975 she toured Europe for eight weeks with the UWEC production of Jacques Brel Is Alive and Well and Living in Paris, one of six American university productions selected by the USO to entertain United States Armed Forces stationed abroad.

Between 1974 and 1977, Anderson worked as the staff pianist and celeste player for Company 10 Playhouse's summer musical theatre seasons at the UWEC campus. She also worked as a pianist at the Barston Dining Room in the Hilton Eau Claire hotel and as an accompanist for local high school choirs.

== Broadway and theatre ==
After graduating from college, Anderson moved to New York City, where she began to work as a medical secretary. Her first music post was as the music director of The First All Children's Theatre.

Her first Broadway job was in 1981 as a keyboard player in the pit orchestra of The Pirates of Penzance, eventually being promoted to associate conductor and conducting the show both on Broadway and on tour through 1983. Also in 1981, she was an associate conductor for the Broadway revival of My Fair Lady, coaching Rex Harrison for his return to the role of Henry Higgins. She was the featured onstage pianist for Jerry's Girls (1985–1986) and served as the assistant conductor for the Broadway production of Me and My Girl (1986–1989). (Note: She was assistant conductor for Stanley Lebowsky and later Tom Helm in Me and My Girl, and she worked together on other productions with Helm.) Anderson was the music director of Cats near the end of its original Broadway run. She later played piano or keyboards in the Broadway orchestras of Chitty Chitty Bang Bang, The Woman in White, Spamalot and The Lion King. According to her Playbill obituary, Anderson was a trailblazer in helping to break Broadway's glass ceiling for female conductors and "lit the flame for many female musicians in their pursuit of respect within the Broadway orchestra pit."

Her other theatre credits included ten productions as music director for Pittsburgh Civic Light Opera at Heinz Hall in Pittsburgh, Pennsylvania: Pirates (1983), Man of La Mancha, George M!, The Desert Song and Carousel (all in 1985), A Funny Thing Happened on the Way to the Forum, Hello, Dolly!, Anything Goes, Fiddler on the Roof and Can-Can (all in 1986). She was also music director of the first production of Martin Guerre at Hartford Stage in Connecticut (1993) and of a production of Big River at Westchester Broadway Theatre in Elmsford, New York, in 2012, where she was also associate conductor for Miss Saigon, Meet Me in St. Louis and Bye Bye Birdie.

== Other positions and later years ==
Anderson conducted pops concerts with the Milwaukee Symphony Orchestra, Detroit Symphony Orchestra, Phoenix Symphony, Portland Symphony Orchestra, Shreveport Symphony Orchestra. She also was the music director for a National Public Radio political satire group, SoundBites. With Field Studies International, she performed regularly at Carnegie Hall. She worked on such films Svengali (1983), where her duties included teaching Peter O'Toole to play piano, and The Ultimate Solution of Grace Quigley (1985). She recorded at Abbey Road Studios, conducting the Philharmonia Orchestra.

She met her eventual husband, Broadway performer Cris Groenendaal, when they were both performing with the improvisation group Broadway Local. The two moved to Croton-on-Hudson, New York, in 1987, married in 1989, and had two children. The two recorded three albums together. They continued to perform together in later years, and she continued to music direct or play the piano until 2024 for concerts and at schools, churches, and choirs in New York City and around the Hudson Valley.

Anderson died in 2025 of cancer, after a long illness, at the age of 70.
