= Lash cinch =

Strap or cord used to secure loads

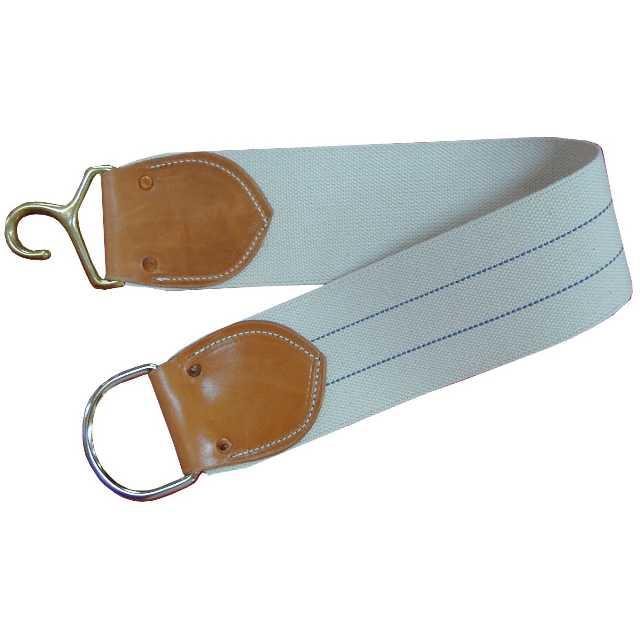
A lash cinch with metal hook.

In the field of animal packing, a lash cinch is the piece of tack used optionally on a pack animal to further secure a load onto a pack saddle.

== Design ==
The lash cinch is made up of a 2 to 18 cm wide and 60 to 120 cm long piece of hide or nylon, attached to a solid metal ring on one end, and to a hook shaped implement of wood or metal on the other end.

It is designed to be used in conjunction with a long rope, which should be securely knotted onto the metal ring. The purpose of the "hook" is to be used as an anchor to further tie the rope through, while being easy to remove so as to allow release of the cinch without having to thread rope.

== See also ==
- Diamond hitch
- Pack saddle
