= Richmond Night Market =

Night market in Richmond, British Columbia

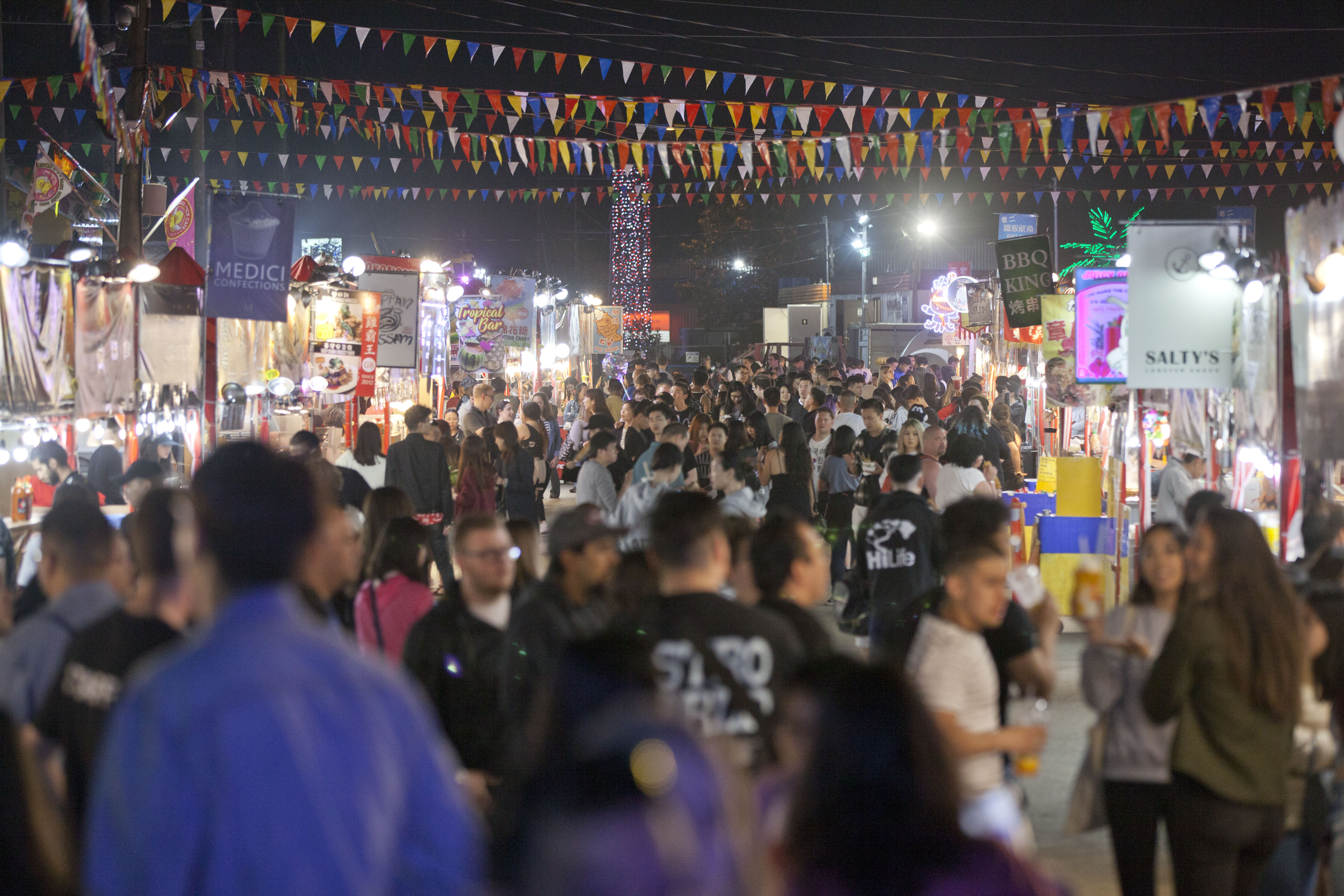
- Richmond Night Market crowds in 2019.
- Frequency: Annually
- Location: Richmond, BC
- Years active: 2000–2026
- Founder: Raymond Cheung
- Organiser: Target Events Production Ltd.
- Website: Official website

The Richmond Night Market was an annual night market in Richmond, British Columbia, that ran from 2000 to 2026. It was the largest night market in North America, drawing more than one million visitors each year.

== History ==
=== Early years (2000–2008) ===
The Richmond Night Market was founded in 2000 by entrepreneur Raymond Cheung. It was first held in the parking lot of the Continental Centre in Richmond, where it ran through the summer. However, tenants at Continental Centre complained about the impact the market was having on their businesses, parking availability and traffic in the surrounding roadways.

In 2001, the Richmond Night Market relocated to the Lansdowne Park Shopping Centre on No. 3 Road in central Richmond. The night market returned to Lansdowne for the summer of 2002, however tenants inside the mall complained about the market's impact on their business, causing the market to relocate once again. In 2003, the Richmond Night Market moved to a clearing next to the soon-to-be-demolished BridgePoint Market.

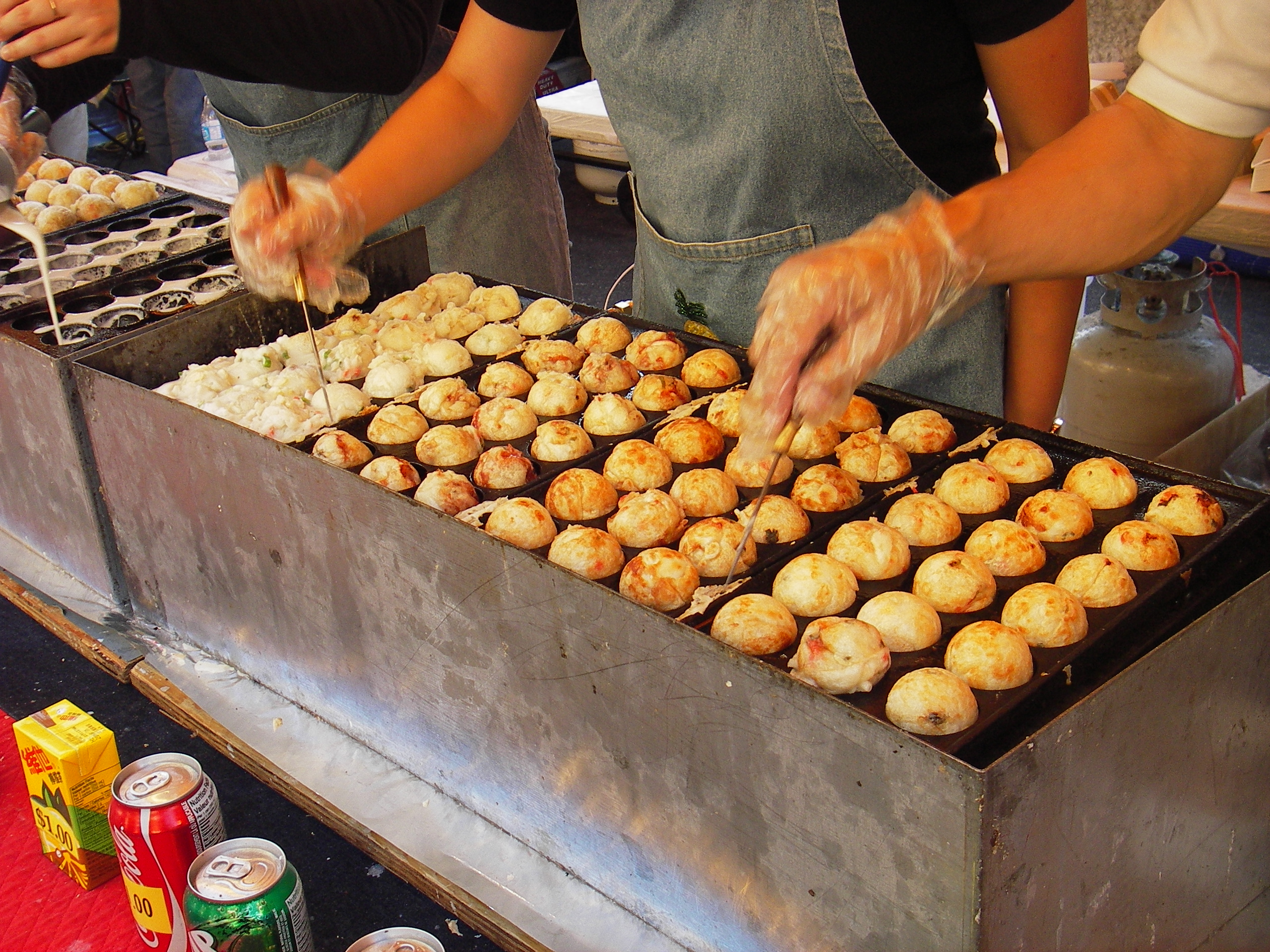
Takoyaki at the Richmond Night Market

The market was later moved to a property on Vulcan Way in the Bridgeport area. In October 2007, the Richmond Night Market's lease expired; organizers were unable to negotiate a new lease, with Cheung stating that the landlord's proposed rent increase was too high to be feasible. Although the organizers attempted to find an alternative location, it was announced in April 2008 that the night market would be cancelled for that summer.

=== Summer Night Market ===
The lease for the Vulcan Way location was taken over by a competing promoter, Lions Communication Inc., who renamed the event to 'Summer Night Market'. In May 2008, the new organizers were granted a two-year permit to operate a night market on the property. In early May 2008, the site was vandalized and the main electrical service pole was cut, which required nearly $100,000 in repairs.

The Summer Night Market ran from May to October from 2008 to 2010. It was then rebranded as the International Summer Night Market, and later the Illumination Night Market, before being cancelled indefinitely in 2018.

=== Proposed New Westminster market (2009–2010) ===
In October 2009, Raymond Cheung stated that a new location had been found for the Richmond Night Market in Queensborough, New Westminster. The venture was a collaboration between Target Entertainment Inc. and Starlight Casino, and was expected to be the largest night market in North America upon its opening in 2010. However, New Westminster City Council requested a traffic impact study be completed before approving an operating permit for the location.

On January 26, 2010, more than 60 people attended the Queensborough Residents Association to discuss the plans for the Richmond Night Market. Residents expressed concerns over how traffic and parking for the market, as well as potential crime, litter, and light pollution.

On 16 April 2010, a few weeks prior to the planned re-opening at the Queensborough location, Starlight Casino withdrew their application for a permit to host the market. On April 19, Raymond Cheung and Starlight Casino released a joint statement announcing the cancellation, citing various factors including the reduction in vendors from 300 to 225, traffic and parking consideration, and increased operating costs from policing. As a result, the Richmond Night Market was unable to open in 2010.

=== Duck Island location (2012–2026) ===
In May 2012, after a two year hiatus, the Richmond Night Market returned with a new location on Duck Island, a large waterfront property just west of Bridgeport station on the Canada Line. The market ran from May 18 to October 8.

Symbol for the Richmond Night Market

In 2025, the Richmond Night Market celebrated its twenty-fifth anniversary. In 2026, the night market featured approximately 250 vendors and 100 food stalls, and employed nearly 1,000 seasonal workers. The market was a major driver for Richmond's economy, drawing over a million visitors each year and acting as an incubator for local small businesses.

On the morning of June 28, 2026, a fire broke out and destroyed fourteen food stalls and caused serious damage. The market opened the same night, although the performance stage and one row of vendors were temporarily closed. Despite a police investigation, the exact cause of the fire was never discovered.

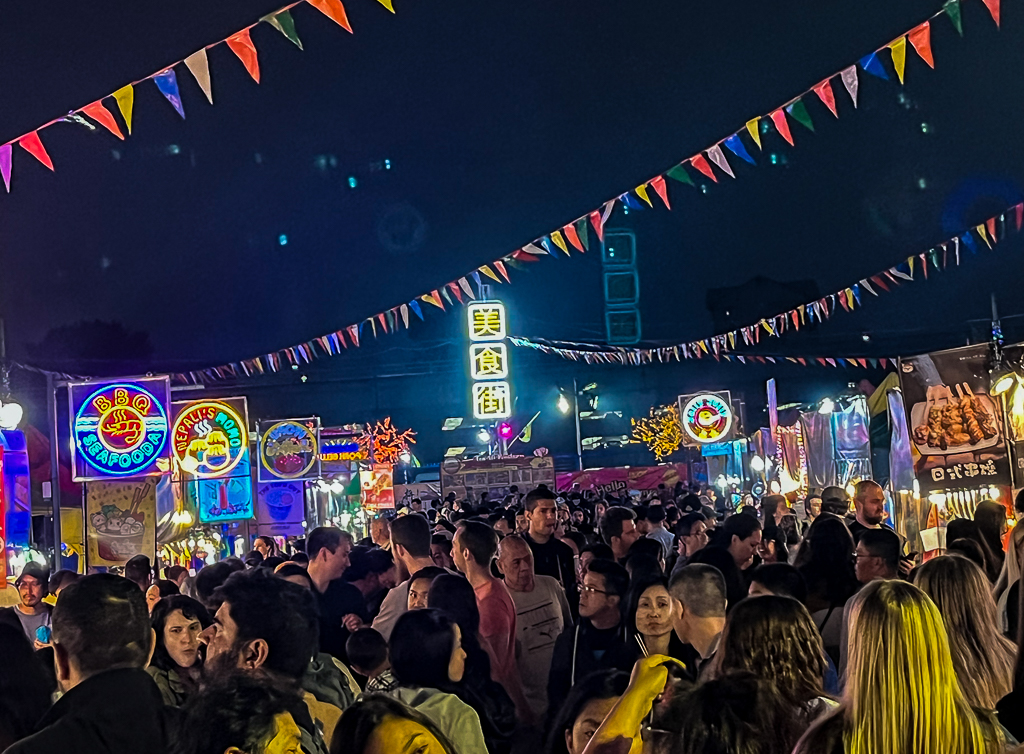
Richmond Night Market on a Saturday Night in summer 2022.

==== Closure ====
On August 5, 2026, founder Raymond Cheung announced the permanent closure of the Richmond Night Market, stating that the lease for Duck Island was expiring due to the site being slated for development. The market's last day of operations was September 20.

== Lawsuit ==
In 2009, Raymond Cheung and Target Event Production Ltd. filed a lawsuit against Lions Communications Inc. and Paul Cheung, the operators of the Summer Night Market, alleging trademark infringement. Paul Cheung responded by saying that night markets were "not an exclusive concept", and that the Summer Night Market would go ahead despite the lawsuit.

The case was heard in the Federal Court between May and June 2009. On January 11, 2010, judgment was passed; the court found that the trademarks of Target Event Production had earned goodwill and distinctiveness, and that visitors to the night market may have been misled. The judgment found that the defendants had not adequately distanced themselves from the former market and passing off was established. The court awarded damages of $15,000 plus legal costs to be paid to Target Event Production, and also ruled that Lions Communications could no longer use the name "Richmond Night Market" or the market's previous floor plan.
