= Grande roue de Montréal =

Ferris wheel in Montréal

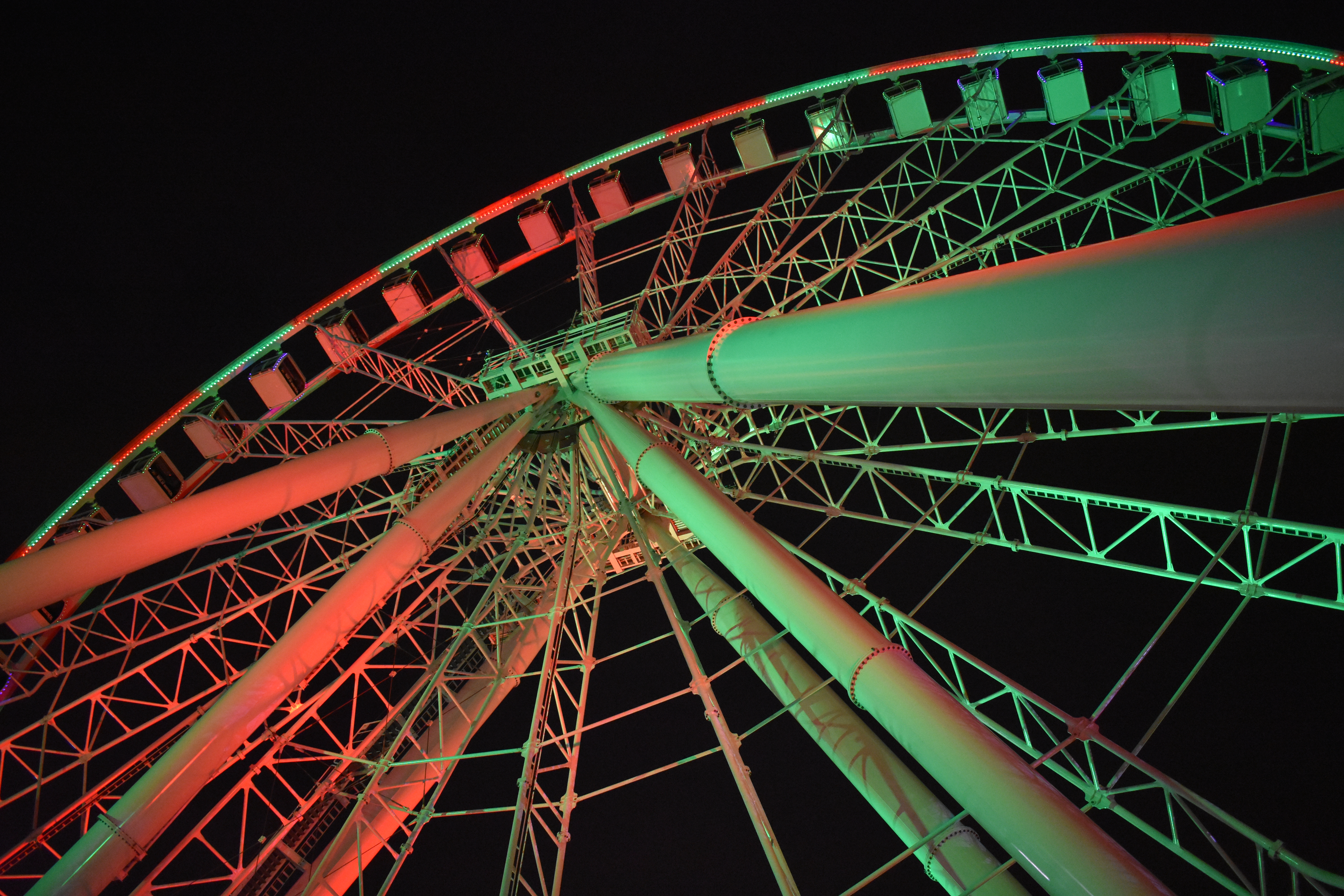
- La Grande roue de Montréal illuminated at night
- Interactive map of Grande roue de Montréal
- Location: Montreal, Quebec, Canada
- Coordinates: 45.5085°N 73.5486°W
- Designer: Dutch Wheels BV
- Type: Ferris wheel
- Height: 60 metres (200 ft)
- Opening date: 2017
- Website: lagranderouedemontreal.com

La Grande roue de Montréal is a Ferris wheel built at the Old Port of Montreal, Quebec, Canada for the 375th anniversary celebrations of the city. Open to the public since 1 September 2017, it is the tallest Ferris wheel in Canada. It is owned by Sandibe Global BV.

== Operation ==
The construction cost of La Grande roue de Montréal, CA$28,000,000, was paid by private investors, and it is operated by La Grande Roue de Montréal Incorporée. Located on Bonsecours Basin Island in the Old Port of Montreal, it is open to the public daily from 10:00 a.m. to 11:00 p.m. and admittance allows for 20 minutes of use.

== Design and conception ==
La Grande roue de Montréal is a Ferris wheel model WS60 (White Series 60 metres) from the Dutch Wheels company (Vekoma group). It is the fourth of the type installed worldwide following ones in Hong Kong (2014), Baku (2014), and Chicago (2016).

With a height of 60 metres (200 ft), it has 42 passenger units attached to its outer circumference. Each unit can fit 8 people and is adesigned for a total capacity of 336 passengers. Climate-controlled cabins and the use of steel graded for use at −40 °C (−40 °F) allows for the wheel to operate year-round.

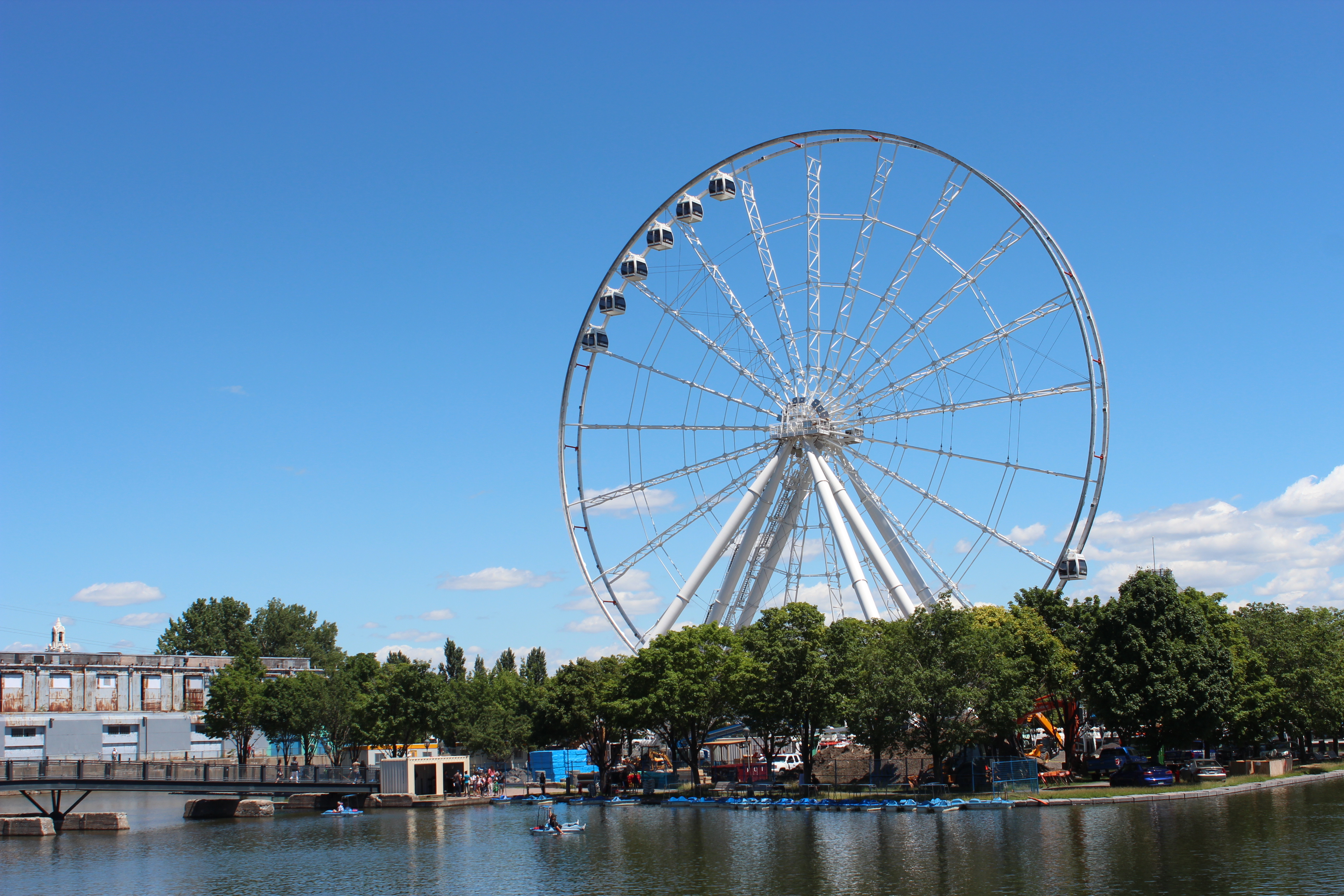
La Grande roue being constructed.

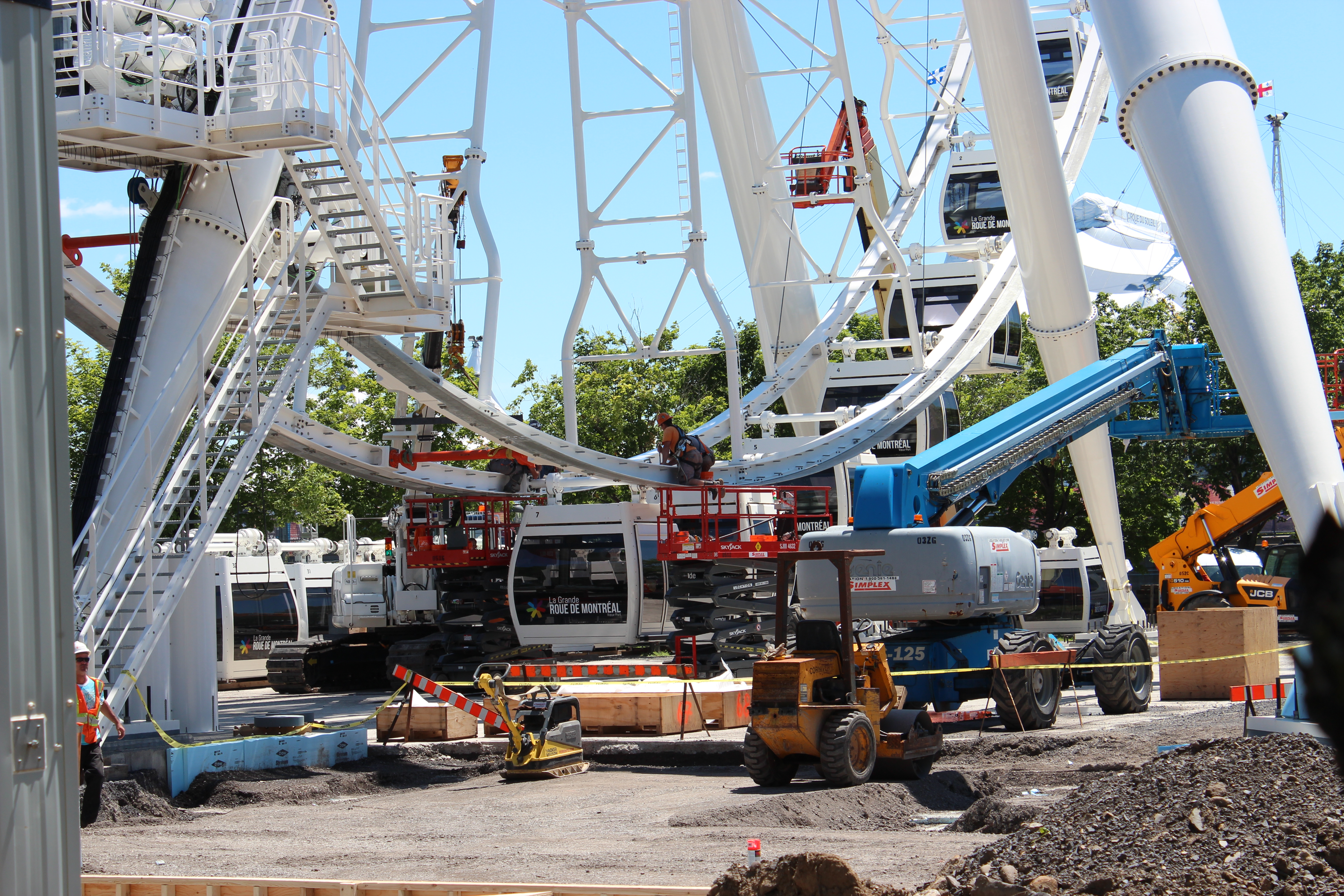
Installation of passenger units on the wheel

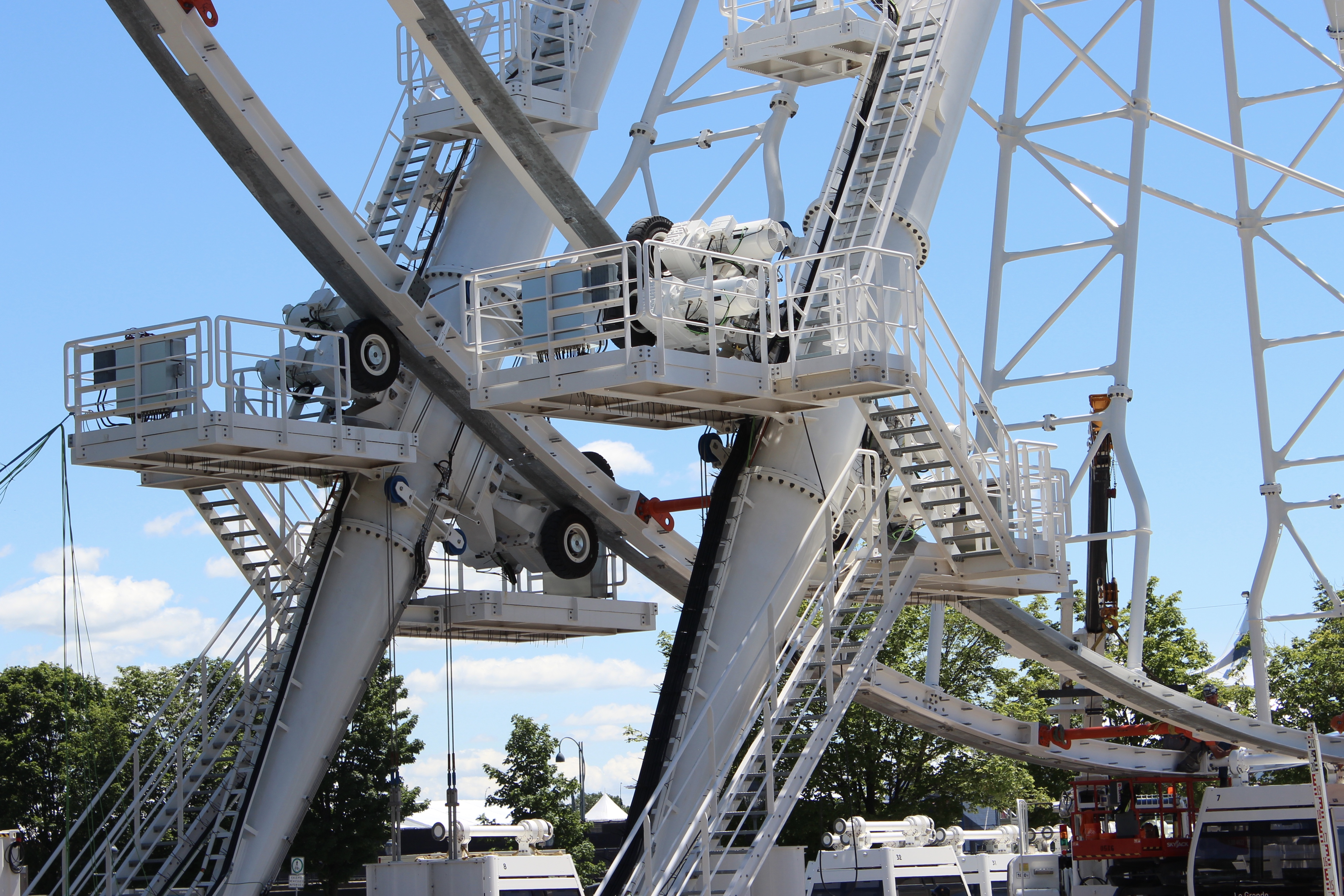
Detail of the drive system

The axis of the wheel is anchored to anti-seismic foundations that allow it to withstand winds up to 240 kilometres per hour (150 mph). The wheel is driven by four pairs of electric motors controlled by a variable-frequency drive.

== Panorama ==
La Grande roue de Montréal offers a 360° view of the city, including Old Montreal, its historic buildings, Place Jacques-Cartier, and the architecture of Downtown Montreal with Mont Royal as the backdrop. To the south, the Saint Lawrence River and its seaway unfold. In the middle of the river, Saint Helen's Island and Notre Dame Island, which were the sites for Expo 67 can also be seen. In the evening Mont Royal can no longer be seen; however, the Mount Royal Cross is illuminated, and accompanies the changing lighting on Jacques-Cartier Bridge.

== See also ==
- List of Ferris wheels
