= Diamond hitch =

Rope work used to secure a set of objects to a base

Single Diamond Hitch
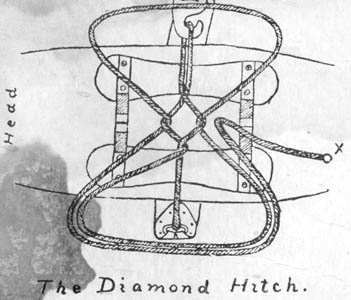
- Names: Single Diamond Hitch, diamond hitch
- Category: Lashing
- Origin: Western north-american continent
- Typical use: packing, other
- ABoK: 2088

The diamond hitch is a lashing technique used mainly in the field of equine packing, to secure a set of objects, for instance a pair of pack-bags, pack-boxes or other gear onto a base, for instance a pack saddle frame, in which case it requires the use of a lash cinch. In the general sense it requires the base to be equipped with at least two points of anchorage, and a rope which is used to lash the object down onto the base. There are two types of Diamond Hitches, a single, shown here, and a double diamond hitch which is not shown.

== Uses ==
Designed and primarily used to secure a load onto a pack-saddle placed on the back of a pack-animal, usually a horse, mule or donkey (although other animals such as llamas or alpacas are regularly used), the diamond hitch can be used in a more general manner to secure anything "loose" to a base that is equipped with at least two anchor points. It can also be used effectively on the bed of a truck, or any other moving platform to which a load is to be secured.

== How to tie ==
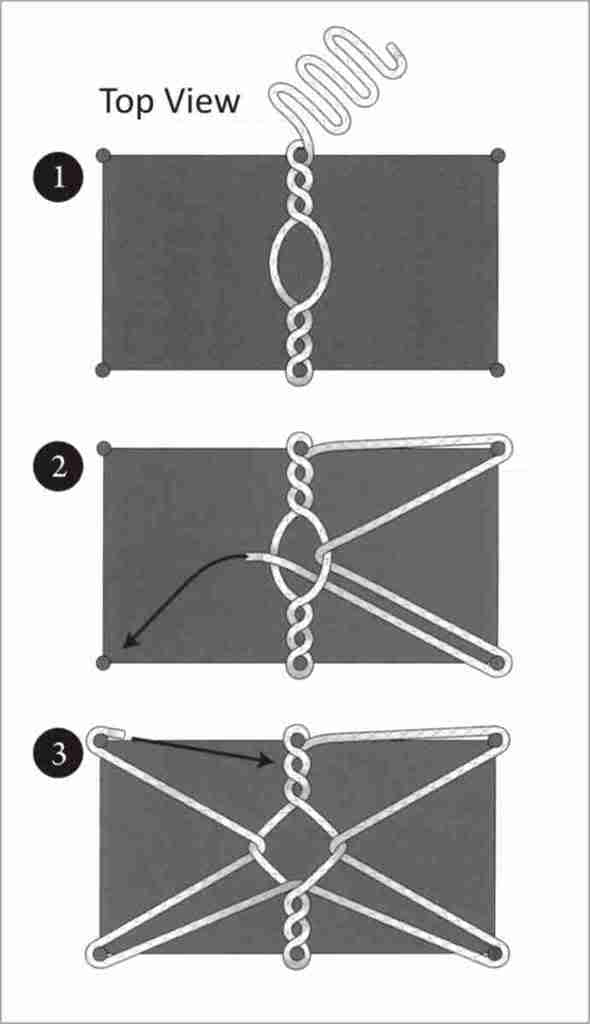
The steps used to tie a diamond hitch with six points of anchorage.

In the diagram shown to the left, six points are used, but the top left, right, bottom left and right points can be ignored by simply "tucking" the rope beneath the load to be tied down, provided its shape and size allow, as is the case when the knot is used on a pack-saddle where those four extra points are simply the four corners of the pack to be tied down. The following description focuses on the way to tie a diamond hitch so as to secure a load onto a pack-saddle.

Tying a diamond hitch requires that a pack saddle be placed and loaded on the back of a pack animal. A lash cinch, made up of a piece of canvas or hide attached to a loop on one end and a hook on the other, is then placed under the animal's belly, generally (and according to the diagram above) with the loop on the animal's right and the hook on its left (the hook allows for easy release of the hitch without the need to feed the long rope through multiple rings).

A long length of rope is attached to the loop by means of a bowline or any other firm knot, and this rope is then passed through the loop once more leaving enough spare to reach over the animal and place the so-formed loop of rope in the hook on the other side. This double length of rope that is passed over the pack is then carefully twisted at least twice (the diagram shows many more twists, but two are generally sufficient), with one twist being forced over towards the right side of the animal, while the other is left on its left, and then it is placed back in the hook, before tightening up the slack.

While maintaining the whole rope tight the running end is then passed under the rear side of the pack-box or pack-bag on the right side, run up towards the top center of the pack where it is passed under the rear of the two strands formed by the twisting, in the center (between the two twists) and then sent over the other side of the animal (at this point unless two people are performing the hitch it is necessary to walk around the animal, while still maintaining tension on the rope).

There it is passed beneath the pack on the animal's left side, and it is also recommended to pass it in the metal hook on the lash cinch for added security. The rope is then led up around the front end of the left pack-box or pack-bag, and passed under the front one of the two twisted strands, as performed with the rear one previously, and still in between the two twists.

Here another change of sides is required for the single tier, as the rope must then be passed in a similar fashion around the front side of the right pack-box or pack-bag, and finally tightened thoroughly, before being tied off onto the metal loop, by means of a half-hitch for example.

== See also ==
- Lash cinch
- Pack saddle
- List of knots
