= Catherine Wreford =

Canadian actress, dancer and singer

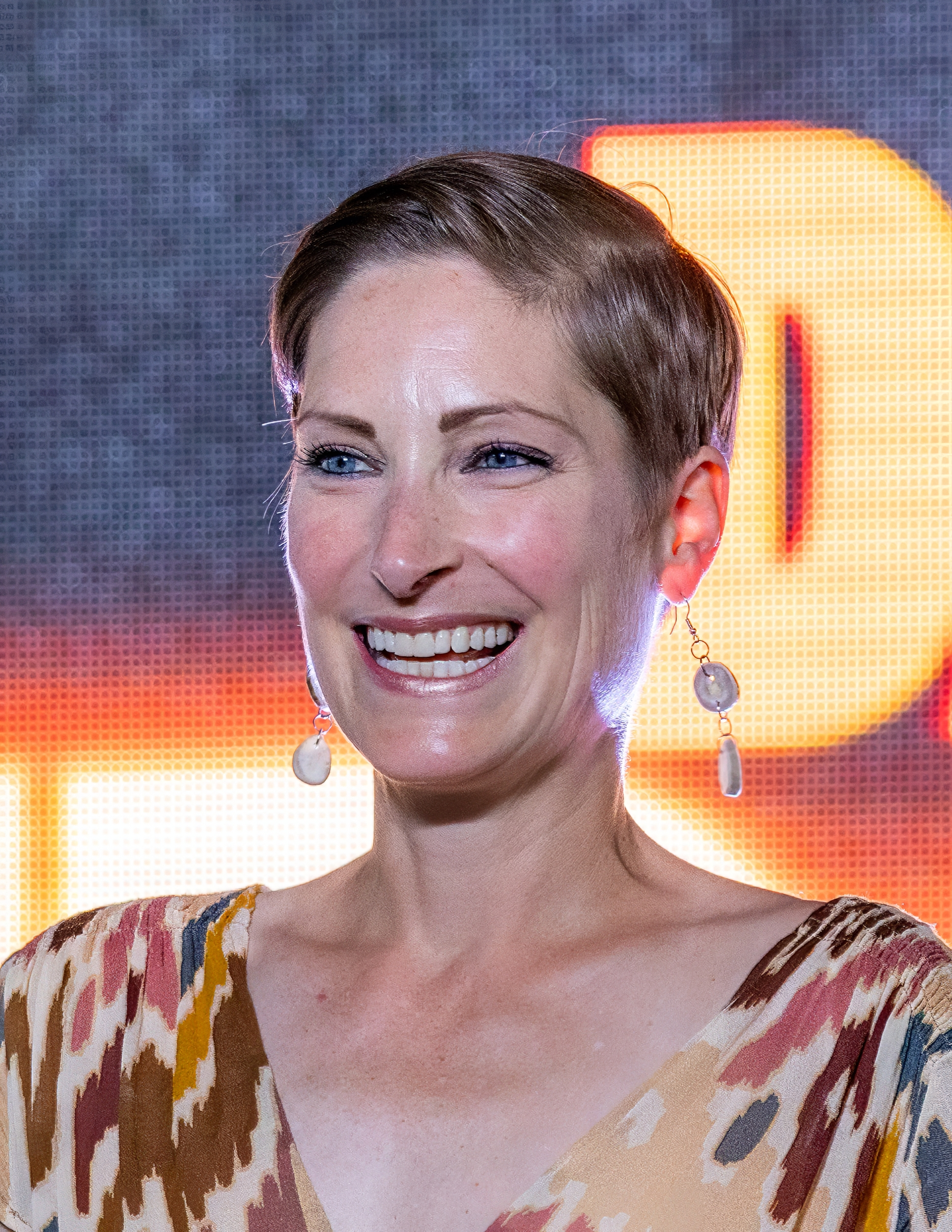
- Born: Catherine Anne Wreford; June 26, 1980 (age 46); Winnipeg, Manitoba, Canada
- Education: Kelvin High School; Royal Winnipeg Ballet
- Occupations: Actor, dancer
- Spouse: Joel Ledlow (m. 2010)
- Children: 2

Catherine Anne Wreford (born June 26, 1980) is a Canadian actress, dancer and singer.

== Early life ==
Wreford was born in Winnipeg, Manitoba, Canada in June 1980. She graduated from Kelvin High School and later trained at the Royal Winnipeg Ballet.

== Career ==
Wreford starred in the Broadway production 42nd Street. In 2019, Wreford returned to performing, including appearing as Lady Capulet in the Royal Winnipeg Ballet's production of Romeo and Juliet in February 2019.

Wreford played the lead role of Alison in the Royal Manitoba Theatre Centre's production of Fun Home, a musical inspired by Alison Bechdel's memoir of the same name. Her son, Eliot Ledlow, was also featured in the show as Little Alison's brother.

Wreford teaches musical theatre at the Shelley Shearer School of Dance in Winnipeg, Manitoba.

== Personal life ==
In 2013, Wreford was diagnosed with anaplastic astrocytoma, a malignant brain tumor, and was told that she was expected to live for only another two to six years. In 2014, she moved back to Winnipeg where she could be supported by her family through treatment. In response to the lack of resources she found after her diagnosis, Wreford helped to found the website "livingoutloud.life", which launched in 2018, to help young people living with terminal illness connect with each other and cope with their diagnoses.

Wreford's daughter was born five weeks before her cancer diagnosis in 2013. She also has a son.

In 2022, Wreford competed with fellow Broadway performer Craig Ramsay on The Amazing Race Canada 8. They finished first in the final leg in Vancouver to win Amazing Race Canada, the $250,000 prize, and two Chevrolet Silverado ZR2s.

== Filmography ==
=== Film ===
Year	Title	Role	Notes
2006	The Butcher	Rachel	
2006	El Mascarado Massacre	Daisy	
2006	Dead Boyz Don't Scream	Callie	
2006	Sorry Charlie!	Jenny Rice	
2006	Pittsburgh	Self / 'The Music Man' Cast	
2007	The Metrosexual	Gwen	
2007	Lords of the Underworld	Baby	

=== Television ===
Year	Title	Role	Notes
2022	The Amazing Race Canada 8	Herself/Contestant	Won with friend Craig Ramsay
2022	SkyMed	NICU nurse	

== Theater ==
- 42nd Street (2 May 2001 — 2 January 2005)
- Oklahoma! (21 March 2002 — 23 February 2003)
- Strike! (May — June 2005)
- Mamma Mia! (2017)
- A Chorus Line (2018)
- Fun Home (November—December 2019)
