= Ice hockey at the 2007 Canada Winter Games – Men's tournament =

2007 Canada Winter Games

Tournament details
- Venue(s): 2 (in 1 host city)
- Dates: February 24–March 2
- Teams: 12

Final positions
- Champions: Ontario (4th title)
- Runner-up: Manitoba
- Third place: Alberta
- Fourth place: British Columbia

Tournament statistics
- Games played: 32
- Goals scored: 300 (9.38 per game)
- Scoring leader(s): Kelsey Tessier (27 points)

The men's tournament in ice hockey at the 2007 Canada Winter Games was held in Whitehorse, Yukon between February 24 and March 2, 2007. Twelve provinces and territories competed in the tournament, with all but Nunavut participating.

== Preliminary round ==
All times are local (UTC−8).

Key

Provinces/Territories qualified for the quarterfinals round are in green
Provinces/Territories qualified for the relegation round are in lavender blue

=== Group A ===
Team	Pld	W	L	D	GF	GA	GD	Pts
Alberta	2	1	0	1	17	0	+17	3
Saskatchewan	2	1	0	1	13	0	+13	3
Northwest Territories	2	0	2	0	0	30	−30	0

February 24, 2007; 20:30	Alberta	0–0 (0–0, 0–0, 0–0)	Saskatchewan	Takhini Arena, Whitehorse

February 25, 2007; 20:00	Northwest Territories	0–13 (0–4, 0–3, 0–6)	Saskatchewan	Canada Games Centre, Whitehorse

Game reference
Michael Taylor	Goalies	Jordan Washburn
10 min	Penalties	6 min
8	Shots	91

February 26, 2007; 19:30	Alberta	17–0 (8–0, 5–0, 4–0)	Northwest Territories	Canada Games Centre, Whitehorse

Game reference
Dalyn Flette	Goalies	Michael Taylor
6 min	Penalties	12 min
106	Shots	3

=== Group B ===
Team	Pld	W	L	D	GF	GA	GD	Pts
Quebec	2	2	0	0	13	2	+11	4
Nova Scotia	2	1	1	0	11	8	+3	2
Yukon	2	0	2	0	5	19	−14	0

February 24, 2007; 11:30	Quebec	9–1	Yukon	Takhini Arena, Whitehorse

Game reference

February 25, 2007; 12:00	Nova Scotia	10–4	Yukon	Takhini Arena, Whitehorse

Game reference

February 26, 2007; 11:30	Nova Scotia	1–4 (0–1, 0–2, 1–1)	Quebec	Takhini Arena, Whitehorse

Game reference
Kirk Rafuse	Goalies	Kevin Poulin
16 min	Penalties	24 min
13	Shots	52

=== Group C ===
Team	Pld	W	L	D	GF	GA	GD	Pts
Ontario	2	2	0	0	16	5	+11	4
Manitoba	2	1	1	0	14	7	+7	2
Prince Edward Island	2	0	2	0	5	23	−18	0

February 24, 2007; 15:30	Ontario	11–3	Prince Edward Island	Takhini Arena, Whitehorse

Game reference

February 25, 2007; 15:30	Manitoba	12–2	Prince Edward Island	Takhini Arena, Whitehorse

Game reference

February 26, 2007; 15:30	Manitoba	2–5 (1–2, 1–2, 0–1)	Ontario	Takhini Arena, Whitehorse

Game reference
Mark Friesen	Goalies	Edward Pasquale
34 min	Penalties	28 min
42	Shots	57

=== Group D ===
Team	Pld	W	L	D	GF	GA	GD	Pts
British Columbia	2	2	0	0	11	8	+3	4
New Brunswick	2	1	1	0	14	13	+1	2
Newfoundland and Labrador	2	0	2	0	7	11	−4	0

February 24, 2007; 19:30	British Columbia	8–6	New Brunswick	Canada Games Centre, Whitehorse

Game reference

February 25, 2007; 19:30	British Columbia	3–2 (1–0, 0–1, 2–1)	Newfoundland and Labrador	Takhini Arena, Whitehorse

Game reference
Martin Jones	Goalies	Nick Champion
18 min	Penalties	26 min
54	Shots	42

February 26, 2007; 19:30	New Brunswick	8–5 (1–1, 4–2, 3–2)	Newfoundland and Labrador	Takhini Arena, Whitehorse

Game reference
Jake Allen	Goalies	Evan Mosher
18 min	Penalties	44 min
61	Shots	35

== Relegation round ==
=== 9–12th place placement ===
Team	Pld	W	L	D	GF	GA	GD	Pts
Newfoundland and Labrador	3	3	0	0	22	3	+19	6
Prince Edward Island	3	2	1	0	16	9	+7	4
Yukon	3	1	2	0	7	14	−7	2
Northwest Territories	3	0	3	0	3	22	−19	0

February 27, 2007; 13:00	Newfoundland and Labrador	12–0 (3–0, 7–0, 2–0)	Northwest Territories	Takhini Arena, Whitehorse

Game reference
Nick Champion	Goalies	Michael Taylor
12 min	Penalties	18 min
70	Shots	20

February 28, 2007; 11:30	Prince Edward Island	7–3 (0–4, 0–3, 0–6)	Yukon	Takhini Arena, Whitehorse

Game reference
Robin Stewart	Goalies	Ian Perrier; Mitch Heynen
14 min	Penalties	12 min
52	Shots	25

March 1, 2007; 10:00	Northwest Territories	1–7 (1–2, 0–4, 0–1)	Prince Edward Island	Takhini Arena, Whitehorse

Game reference
Andy Williams	Goalies	Tyler MacDonald
36 min	Penalties	14 min
19	Shots	78

March 1, 2007; 15:30	Newfoundland and Labrador	5–1 (2–1, 0–0, 3–0)	Yukon	Canada Games Centre, Whitehorse

Game reference
Evan Mosher	Goalies	Mitch Heynen
18 min	Penalties	8 min
30	Shots	27

March 2, 2007; 09:00	Newfoundland and Labrador	5–2 (1–2, 0–4, 0–1)	Prince Edward Island	Takhini Arena, Whitehorse

Game reference
Evan Mosher	Goalies	Robin Stewart
16 min	Penalties	14 min
34	Shots	30

March 2, 2007; 15:30	Northwest Territories	2–3 GWS (0–0, 0–0, 2–2) (OT: 0–0) (SO: 0–1)	Yukon	Takhini Arena, Whitehorse

Game reference
Andy Williams	Goalies	Mitch Heynen
28 min	Penalties	20 min
15	Shots	74

=== 5–8th place placement ===
Team	Pld	W	L	D	GF	GA	GD	Pts
Quebec	3	2	1	0	16	8	+8	4
Saskatchewan	3	2	1	0	21	14	+7	4
New Brunswick	3	2	1	0	16	16	0	4
Nova Scotia	3	0	3	0	8	23	−15	0

February 28, 2007; 16:00	Nova Scotia	4–10 (1–3, 1–3, 2–4)	Saskatchewan	Canada Games Centre, Whitehorse

Game reference
Jon MacDonald	Goalies	Jordan Washburn
14 min	Penalties	10 min
33	Shots	58

February 28, 2007; 20:00	New Brunswick	5–4 (1–1, 1–1, 3–2)	Quebec	Canada Games Centre, Whitehorse

Game reference
Nathan Dunnett	Goalies	Kevin Poulin
20 min	Penalties	24 min
31	Shots	64

March 1, 2007; 19:30	Nova Scotia	1–7 (0–1, 1–1, 0–5)	Quebec	Canada Games Centre, Whitehorse

Game reference
Kirk Rafuse	Goalies	Antoine Tardif
24 min	Penalties	14 min
22	Shots	69

March 1, 2007; 19:30	New Brunswick	5–9 (0–2, 4–6, 1–1)	Saskatchewan	Takhini Arena, Whitehorse

Game reference
Nathan Dunnett; Jake Allen	Goalies	Jordan Washburn
18 min	Penalties	8 min
53	Shots	61

March 2, 2007; 12:30	New Brunswick	6–3 (2–1, 2–2, 2–0)	Nova Scotia	Canada Games Centre, Whitehorse

Game reference
Jake Allen	Goalies	Kirk Rafuse
18 min	Penalties	26 min
49	Shots	47

March 2, 2007; 16:00	Quebec	5–2 (3–0, 1–0, 1–2)	Saskatchewan	Canada Games Centre, Whitehorse

Game reference
Antoine Tardif	Goalies	Jeffrey Bosch
16 min	Penalties	12 min
80	Shots	39

== Playoff round ==
=== Bracket ===
Quarterfinals
February 27
Alberta	4
New Brunswick	3
February 27
Quebec	6
Manitoba (OT)	7
February 27
Ontario	6
Nova Scotia	0
February 27
British Columbia (OT)	5
Saskatchewan	4

Semifinals
February 28
Alberta	1
Manitoba	5
February 28
Ontario (OT)	4
British Columbia	3

Gold medal game
March 2
Manitoba	4
Ontario	6
Bronze medal game
March 2
Alberta	4
British Columbia	3

=== Quarterfinals ===
February 27, 2007; 16:30	Alberta	4–3 (1–1, 1–1, 2–1)	New Brunswick	Takhini Arena, Whitehorse

Game reference
Jacob DeSerres	Goalies	Jake Allen
26 min	Penalties	14 min
30	Shots	50

February 27, 2007; 16:30	Manitoba	7–6 OT (2–1, 1–1, 3–4) (OT: 1–0)	Quebec	Canada Games Centre, Whitehorse

Game reference
Mark Friesen	Goalies	Kevin Poulin; Antoine Tardif
8 min	Penalties	28 min
33	Shots	32

February 27, 2007; 20:30	Nova Scotia	0–6 (0–4, 0–2, 0–0)	Ontario	Takhini Arena, Whitehorse

Game reference
Kirk Rafuse	Goalies	Chris Carrozzi
22 min	Penalties	10 min
11	Shots	77

February 27, 2007; 20:30	British Columbia	5–4 OT (0–2, 3–1, 1–1) (OT: 1–0)	Saskatchewan	Canada Games Centre, Whitehorse

Game reference
Martin Jones	Goalies	Jeffrey Bosch
10 min	Penalties	16 min
49	Shots	28

=== Semifinals ===
February 28, 2007; 15:30	British Columbia	3–4 OT (1–2, 1–0, 1–1) (OT: 0–1)	Ontario	Takhini Arena, Whitehorse

Game reference
Martin Jones	Goalies	Edward Pasquale
10 min	Penalties	8 min
23	Shots	35

February 28, 2007; 19:30	Alberta	1–5 (1–2, 0–1, 0–2)	Manitoba	Takhini Arena, Whitehorse

Game reference
Jacob DeSerres	Goalies	Mark Friesen
10 min	Penalties	16 min
31	Shots	43

=== Bronze medal game ===
March 2, 2007; 11:00	Alberta	4–3 (2–1, 2–1, 0–1)	British Columbia	Takhini Arena, Whitehorse

Game reference

Jacob DeSerres
Goalies
Martin Jones

Eberle (Boomer) – 00:56	1–0
	1–1	09:11 – Shattock (McMillan, Lee)
Rowley (King, Myers) – 13:42	2–1
	2–2	24:49 – Bloodoff (St. Denis, Reddington)
Eberle (Boomer, Siego) – 34:44	3–2
Boomer (King, Eberle) – 37:22	4–2
	4–3	56:49 – St. Denis (Bloodoff)

12 min
Penalties
24 min
39
Shots
25

=== Gold medal game ===
March 2, 2007; 19:30	Manitoba	4–6 (2–3, 2–2, 0–1)	Ontario	Takhini Arena, Whitehorse

Game reference

Mark Friesen
Kyle Birch
Goalies
Edward Pasquale
Chris Carrozzi

	0–1	00:18 – Hodgson (Nigro)
	0–2	04:48 – Kadri (D’Orazio, Geoffrey)
Wiebe (Adamyk) – 06:47	1–2
Schmidt (Adamyk) – 09:54	2–2
	2–3	13:43 – Stamkos (Pietrangelo, Del Zotto)
	2–4	20:29 – Moon (Stamkos, Del Zotto)
Toews – 23:15	3–4
	3–5	25:44 – Del Zotto (Stamkos, Pietrangelo)
Toews (Mistlebacher) – 30:44	4–5
	4–6	49:58 – Della Rovere (Livingston, Kadri)

22 min
Penalties
10 min
23
Shots
30

== Final ranking and statistics ==
=== Final ranking ===
Rank	Team
1st place, gold medalist(s)	Ontario
2nd place, silver medalist(s)	Manitoba
3rd place, bronze medalist(s)	Alberta
4	British Columbia
5	Quebec
6	Saskatchewan
7	New Brunswick
8	Nova Scotia
9	Newfoundland and Labrador
10	Prince Edward Island
11	Yukon
12	Northwest Territories
