= Ice hockey at the 2011 Canada Winter Games =

2011 Canada Winter Games

Tournament details
- Venue(s): 3 (in 2 host cities)
- Dates: February 12–26
- Teams: 12

Ice hockey at the 2011 Canada Winter Games was held at the Halifax Metro Centre and Halifax Forum in Halifax and the Dartmouth Sportsplex in Dartmouth, Nova Scotia.

The men's tournament was held during the first week, between February 12 and 18, and the women's tournament was held during the second week, between February 20 and 26.

== Medalists ==
Games	Gold	Silver	Bronze
Men	British Columbia; Tristan Jarry; Macoy Erkamps; Kyle Burroughs; Shea Theodore; Ayrton Nikkel; Dylan Bowen; Josh Connolly; Steen Cooper; Luke Bertolucci; Brandon Potomak; Sam Reinhart; Jackson Houck; Curtis Lazar; Matt Needham; Nic Petan; Brett Harris; Cole Sanford; Brennan Clark; Luke Harrison; Jackson Whistle	Quebec; David Bédard; Samuel Morin; Maxime Gravel; Justin Guénette; Élie Bérubé; Carl Tremblay; Anthony Duclair; Alexandre Caron-Roy; Jérémy Grégoire; Anthony Deluca; Philippe Venne; Jonathan Drouin; Alexandre Ranger; Alexander Jorge; Miguel Caron; Frédérik Gauthier; Simon Desbiens; Guillaume Gauthier; Alexandre Bélanger; Philippe Desrosiers	Alberta; Eric Comrie; Keegan Kanzig; Mason Geertsen; Jared Hauf; JT Morrissey; Spenser Jensen; Morgan Klimchuk; Dillon Heatherington; Jesse Lees; Johnathon Merkley; Ryan Chynoweth; Jaedon Descheneau; Cole Benson; Nelson Gadoury; Tyson Baillie; Cole Ully; Luke Philp; Torrin White; Greg Chase; Brett Zarowny
Women	Alberta	Ontario	Quebec

== Venues ==
The tournament was hosted in two host cities.

Halifax	Halifax	Dartmouth
Halifax Metro Centre	Halifax Forum	Dartmouth Sportsplex
Capacity: 10,595	Capacity: 5,900	Capacity: 3,000

== Men ==
=== Group A ===
Team	Pld	W	OTW	OTL	L	GF	GA	GD	Pts	Qualification
Ontario	3	2	0	1	0	12	4	+8	7	Qualified for the quarter-finals round
Quebec	3	0	3	0	0	13	10	+3	6	Qualified for the quarter-finals round
British Columbia	3	1	0	1	1	13	13	0	4	Qualified for the quarter-finals round
Nova Scotia	3	0	0	1	2	7	18	−11	1	Qualified for the qualification round

All times are local (UTC-4).

February 12, 2011; 16:00	British Columbia	4 – 5 OT	Quebec	Halifax Metro Centre, Halifax

Game reference

February 12, 2011; 19:30	Nova Scotia	0–5	Ontario	Halifax Metro Centre, Halifax

Game reference

February 13, 2011; 16:00	British Columbia	8–3	Nova Scotia	Halifax Metro Centre, Halifax

Game reference

February 13, 2011; 19:30	Ontario	2 – 3 OT	Quebec	Halifax Metro Centre, Halifax

Game reference

February 14, 2011; 16:00	Nova Scotia	4 – 5 OT	Quebec	Halifax Metro Centre, Halifax

Game reference

February 14, 2011; 19:30	British Columbia	1–5	Ontario	Halifax Metro Centre, Halifax

Game reference

=== Group B ===
Team	Pld	W	L	GF	GA	GD	Pts	Qualification
Alberta	3	3	0	17	6	+11	9	Qualified for the quarter-finals round
Manitoba	3	1	2	11	14	−3	3	Qualified for the quarter-finals round
Saskatchewan	3	1	2	6	13	−7	3	Qualified for the quarter-finals round
New Brunswick	3	1	2	14	15	−1	3	Qualified for the qualification round

- The three teams finished tied for second were ranked according to goal differential between the games played amongst themselves.

All times are local (UTC-4).

February 12, 2011; 16:00	Manitoba	4–6	New Brunswick	Dartmouth Sportsplex, Dartmouth

Game reference

February 12, 2011; 19:30	Alberta	4–1	Saskatchewan	Dartmouth Sportsplex, Dartmouth

Game reference

February 13, 2011; 16:00	Alberta	6–5	New Brunswick	Dartmouth Sportsplex, Dartmouth

Game reference

February 13, 2011; 19:30	Manitoba	6–1	Saskatchewan	Dartmouth Sportsplex, Dartmouth

Game reference

February 14, 2011; 16:00	New Brunswick	3–5	Saskatchewan	Dartmouth Sportsplex, Dartmouth

Game reference

February 14, 2011; 19:30	Alberta	7–1	Manitoba	Dartmouth Sportsplex, Dartmouth

Game reference

=== Group C ===
Team	Pld	W	L	GF	GA	GD	Pts	Qualification
Newfoundland and Labrador	3	2	1	13	4	+9	6	Qualified for the qualification round
Prince Edward Island	3	2	1	18	10	+8	6	Qualified for the qualification round
Northwest Territories	3	1	2	12	15	−3	3	
Yukon	3	1	2	4	18	−14	3	

All times are local (UTC-4).

February 12, 2011; 11:30	Prince Edward Island	10–1	Yukon	Halifax Metro Centre, Halifax

Game reference

February 12, 2011; 11:30	Newfoundland and Labrador	7–1	Northwest Territories	Dartmouth Sportsplex, Dartmouth

Game reference

February 13, 2011; 11:30	Northwest Territories	4–7	Prince Edward Island	Halifax Metro Centre, Halifax

Game reference

February 13, 2011; 11:30	Newfoundland and Labrador	1–2	Yukon	Dartmouth Sportsplex, Dartmouth

Game reference

February 14, 2011; 11:30	Newfoundland and Labrador	5–1	Prince Edward Island	Halifax Metro Centre, Halifax

Game reference

February 14, 2011; 11:30	Northwest Territories	7–1	Yukon	Dartmouth Sportsplex, Dartmouth

Game reference

=== Qualification round ===
February 15, 2011; 16:00	Newfoundland and Labrador	2–7	Nova Scotia	Dartmouth Sportsplex, Dartmouth

Game reference

February 15, 2011; 16:00	Prince Edward Island	2–6	New Brunswick	Halifax Metro Centre, Halifax

Game reference

=== Placement ===
February 16, 2011; 11:30	Newfoundland and Labrador	7–1	Yukon	Halifax Metro Centre, Halifax

Game reference

February 16, 2011; 11:30 Match 28	Prince Edward Island	8–3	Northwest Territories	Dartmouth Sportsplex, Dartmouth

Game reference

=== Eleventh-place match ===
February 17, 2011; 11:30	Yukon	2–3	Northwest Territories	Halifax Metro Centre, Halifax

Game reference

=== Ninth-place match ===
February 17, 2011; 11:30	Newfoundland and Labrador	3–6	Prince Edward Island	Dartmouth Sportsplex, Dartmouth

Game reference

=== Quarter-finals ===
February 16, 2011; 16:00	British Columbia	4–2	Manitoba	Dartmouth Sportsplex, Dartmouth

Game reference

February 16, 2011; 16:00	Quebec	4–3	Saskatchewan	Halifax Metro Centre, Halifax

Game reference

February 16, 2011; 19:30	Alberta	3–2	New Brunswick	Dartmouth Sportsplex, Dartmouth

Game reference

February 16, 2011; 19:30	Ontario	5–3	Nova Scotia	Halifax Metro Centre, Halifax

Game reference

=== 5–8th place Bracket ===
February 17, 2011; 16:00	Manitoba	4–1	Nova Scotia	Dartmouth Sportsplex, Dartmouth

Game reference

February 17, 2011; 19:30	New Brunswick	0–4	Saskatchewan	Dartmouth Sportsplex, Dartmouth

Game reference

=== 7th-place match ===
February 18, 2011; 11:30	Nova Scotia	5–3	New Brunswick	Dartmouth Sportsplex, Dartmouth

Game reference

=== 5th-place match ===
February 18, 2011; 11:30	Manitoba	3 – 2 OT	Saskatchewan	Halifax Metro Centre, Halifax

Game reference

=== Semi-finals ===
February 17, 2011; 16:00	Quebec	5 – 4 OT	Alberta	Halifax Metro Centre, Halifax

Game reference

February 17, 2011; 19:30	British Columbia	5–2	Ontario	Halifax Metro Centre, Halifax

Game reference

=== Bronze-medal match ===
February 18, 2011; 16:00	Alberta	5–3	Ontario	Halifax Metro Centre, Halifax

Game reference

=== Gold-medal match ===
February 18, 2011; 19:30	Quebec	4–7	British Columbia	Halifax Metro Centre, Halifax

Game reference

=== Final standings ===
Rank	Team	Record
1st place, gold medalist(s)	British Columbia	4–2
2nd place, silver medalist(s)	Quebec	5–1
3rd place, bronze medalist(s)	Alberta	5–1
4	Ontario	3–3
5	Manitoba	3–3
6	Saskatchewan	2–4
7	Nova Scotia	1–4
8	New Brunswick	1–4
9	Prince Edward Island	3–2
10	Newfoundland and Labrador	3–2
11	Northwest Territories	2–3
12	Yukon	1–4

== Women ==
=== Group A ===
Team	Pld	W	OTW	OTL	L	GF	GA	GD	Pts
Alberta	4	4	0	0	0	21	1	+20	12
Ontario	4	3	0	0	1	16	6	+10	9
Saskatchewan	4	2	0	0	2	5	8	−3	6
British Columbia	4	1	0	0	3	5	9	−4	3
Newfoundland and Labrador	4	0	0	0	4	0	23	−23	0

All times are local (UTC-4).

February 20, 2011; 11:00	Alberta	4–0	British Columbia	Dartmouth Sportsplex, Dartmouth

Game reference

February 20, 2011; 16:00	Newfoundland and Labrador	0–3	Saskatchewan	Dartmouth Sportsplex, Dartmouth

Game reference

February 20, 2011; 20:00	British Columbia	1–4	Ontario	Dartmouth Sportsplex, Dartmouth

Game reference

February 21, 2011; 11:30	Alberta	10–0	Newfoundland and Labrador	Dartmouth Sportsplex, Dartmouth

Game reference

February 21, 2011; 16:00	Ontario	5–1	Saskatchewan	Dartmouth Sportsplex, Dartmouth

Game reference

February 22, 2011; 11:00	Alberta	3–0	Saskatchewan	Dartmouth Sportsplex, Dartmouth

February 22, 2011; 16:00	British Columbia	4–0	Newfoundland and Labrador	Dartmouth Sportsplex, Dartmouth

February 22, 2011; 20:00	Alberta	4–1	Ontario	Dartmouth Sportsplex, Dartmouth

February 23, 2011; 11:30	British Columbia	0–1	Saskatchewan	Dartmouth Sportsplex, Dartmouth

February 23, 2011; 16:00	Newfoundland and Labrador	0–6	Ontario	Dartmouth Sportsplex, Dartmouth

Game reference
Ayla Frank	Goalies	Brianna Quade
None / Goals / Sarah Robson, Cayley Mercer (2), Kayla Raniwsky, Rebecca Kohler, Laura Stacey

=== Group B ===
Team	Pld	W	OTW	OTL	L	GF	GA	GD	Pts
Quebec	4	4	0	0	0	31	2	+29	12
Manitoba	4	3	1	0	0	29	13	+16	11
Nova Scotia	4	2	0	1	1	19	10	+9	7
Prince Edward Island	4	1	0	0	3	15	12	+3	3
New Brunswick	4	1	0	0	3	22	15	+7	3
Yukon	4	0	0	0	4	1	65	−64	0

All times are local (UTC-4).

February 20, 2011; 11:30	Manitoba	6–2	New Brunswick	Halifax Metro Centre, Halifax

Game reference

February 20, 2011; 16:00	Quebec	17–0	Yukon	Halifax Metro Centre, Halifax

Game reference

February 20, 2011; 19:30	Nova Scotia	4–1	Prince Edward Island	Halifax Metro Centre, Halifax

Game reference

February 21, 2011; 11:30	Manitoba	19–0	Yukon	Halifax Metro Centre, Halifax

Game reference

February 21, 2011; 16:00	New Brunswick	2–5	Prince Edward Island	Halifax Metro Centre, Halifax

February 21, 2011; 19:30	Nova Scotia	1–5	Quebec	Halifax Metro Centre, Halifax

February 22, 2011; 11:30	New Brunswick	17–0	Yukon	Halifax Metro Centre, Halifax

February 22, 2011; 16:00	Prince Edward Island	0–5	Quebec	Halifax Metro Centre, Halifax

February 22, 2011; 19:30	Manitoba	3–2 (OT)	Nova Scotia	Halifax Metro Centre, Halifax

Game reference
Sara Robichaud, Blayre Tura Bull / Goals / Kayleigh Wiens (2), Meghan Dufault

February 23, 2011; 11:30	Manitoba	1–9	Prince Edward Island	Halifax Metro Centre, Halifax

February 23, 2011; 16:00	New Brunswick	1–4	Quebec	Halifax Metro Centre, Halifax

February 22, 2011; 19:30	Nova Scotia	12–1	Yukon	Halifax Metro Centre, Halifax

=== Semi-finals ===
February 25, 2011; 16:00	Ontario	3 – 2 OT	Quebec	Halifax Metro Centre, Halifax

Game reference
Amanda Makela	Goalies	Ann-Renée Desbiens
Emily Fulton, Nicole Kosta / Goals / Sarah Lefort, Nicole Gass

February 25, 2011; 19:30	Alberta	6–2	Saskatchewan	Halifax Metro Centre, Halifax

Game reference
Emerance Maschmeyer	Goalies	Krista Funke
Amy Helfrich, Erika Sowchuk, Melissa Kueber, Katy Josephs, Bryanne Panchuk, Heather Kashman / Goals / Jessica Sibley, Ellen Lind

=== Bronze-medal match ===
February 26, 2011; 16:00	Quebec	4–3	Saskatchewan	Dartmouth Sportsplex, Dartmouth

Game reference
Ann-Renée Desbiens	Goalies	Krista Funke
Gaby Davidson (2), Vickie Lemire, Laurence Porlier / Goals / Lauren Zary, Emily Clark, Kennedy Ottenbreit

=== Gold-medal match ===
February 26, 2011; 19:30	Alberta	3–2	Ontario	Dartmouth Sportsplex, Dartmouth

Game reference
Emerance Maschmeyer	Goalies	Amanda Makela
Brittney Fouracres, Bryanne Panchuk (2) / Goals / Emily Fulton, Cayley Lynne Mercer

=== Final standings ===
Rank	Team	Record
Gold medal	Alberta	6–0
Silver medal	Ontario	
Bronze medal	Quebec	
4	Saskatchewan	
5	Manitoba	
6	British Columbia	
7	Prince Edward Island	
8	Nova Scotia	
9	New Brunswick	
10	Newfoundland and Labrador	
11	Yukon	
