= Ice hockey at the Canada Games =

- Founded: 1967
- No. of teams: 13
- Country: Canada
- Most titles: Men: Ontario (5); Women: Ontario (4)
- Website: canadagames.ca/hockey

The quadrennial Canada Winter Games competition has an ice hockey tournament. The participants are the provincial and territorial ice hockey associations.

== Participants ==
- Alberta (Hockey Alberta)
- British Columbia (BC Hockey)
- Manitoba (Hockey Manitoba)
- New Brunswick (Hockey New Brunswick)
- Newfoundland and Labrador (Hockey Newfoundland and Labrador)
- Northwest Territories (Hockey North)
- Nova Scotia (Hockey Nova Scotia)
- Nunavut (Hockey North)
- Ontario (Hockey Eastern Ontario, Hockey Northwestern Ontario, and Ontario Hockey Federation)
- Prince Edward Island (Hockey PEI)
- Quebec (Hockey Québec)
- Saskatchewan (Hockey Saskatchewan)
- Yukon (British Columbia Amateur Hockey Association)

== Statistics ==
=== Participating provinces ===
==== Men ====
Province	1967	1971	1975	1979	1983	1987	1991	1995	1999	2003	2007	2011	2015	2019
Alberta	1	2	1	8	5	8	2	2	1	1	3	3	2	3
British Columbia	2	–	–	1	2	3	10	5	3	4	4	1	6	7
Manitoba	–	–	–	5	10	10	3	6	8	7	2	5	3	5
New Brunswick	–	–	–	9	6	6	8	8	6	8	7	8	8	8
Newfoundland and Labrador	–	–	–	10	9	5	9	7	10	9	9	10	10	10
Northwest Territories	–	–	–	11	–	11	–	–	11	–	12	11	12	11
Nova Scotia	–	–	2	2	7	9	7	9	9	6	8	7	5	6
Nunavut										–	–	–	–	12
Ontario	3	1	–	3	1	2	1	4	4	3	1	4	1	2
Prince Edward Island	–	–	–	4	8	7	6	10	5	10	10	9	9	9
Quebec	–	3	3	7	3	1	4	3	2	2	5	2	4	1
Saskatchewan	–	–	–	6	4	4	5	1	7	5	6	6	7	4
Yukon	–	–	–	–	–	–	11	11	12	11	11	–	11	13

==== Women ====
Province	1991	1995	1999	2003	2007	2011	2015	2019
Alberta	1	5	3	7	9	1	3	1
British Columbia	2	6	5	6	8	6	6	3
Manitoba	5	4	7	4	2	5	5	5
New Brunswick	7	7	10	10	7	9	8	7
Newfoundland and Labrador	10	10	8	9	5	10	9	10
Northwest Territories	–	–	–	–	11	–	11	11
Nova Scotia	8	8	6	5	6	8	7	8
Nunavut				–	–	–	–	–
Ontario	4	1	1	1	1	2	2	4
Prince Edward Island	9	9	9	8	10	7	10	9
Quebec	3	3	2	2	3	4	1	2
Saskatchewan	6	2	4	3	4	3	4	6
Yukon	–	–	–	11	12	11	12	12

=== Medal winners ===
==== Men ====
Games	Gold	Silver	Bronze
1967 Quebec City	Alberta	British Columbia	Ontario
1971 Saskatoon	Ontario	Alberta	Quebec
1975 Lethbridge	Alberta	Nova Scotia	Quebec
1979 Brandon	British Columbia	Nova Scotia	Ontario
1983 Saguenay/Lac Saint-Jean	Ontario	British Columbia	Quebec
1987 Sydney	Quebec	Ontario	British Columbia
1991 Charlottetown	Ontario	Alberta	Manitoba
1995 Grande Prairie	Saskatchewan	Alberta	Quebec
1999 Corner Brook	Alberta	Quebec	British Columbia
2003 Bathurst/Campbellton	Alberta	Quebec	Ontario
2007 Whitehorse	Ontario	Manitoba	Alberta
2011 Halifax	British Columbia	Quebec	Alberta
2015 Prince George	Ontario	Alberta	Manitoba
2019 Red Deer	Quebec	Ontario	Alberta

==== Women ====
Games	Gold	Silver	Bronze
1991 Charlottetown	Alberta	British Columbia	Quebec
1995 Grande Prairie	Ontario	Saskatchewan	Quebec
1999 Corner Brook	Ontario	Quebec	Alberta
2003 Bathurst/Campbellton	Ontario	Quebec	Saskatchewan
2007 Whitehorse	Ontario	Manitoba	Quebec
2011 Halifax	Alberta	Ontario	Saskatchewan
2015 Prince George	Quebec	Ontario	Alberta
2019 Red Deer	Alberta	Quebec	British Columbia

=== Medal table ===
==== Men ====
Rank	Nation	Gold	Silver	Bronze	Total
1	Ontario	5	2	3	10
2	Alberta	4	4	3	11
3	Quebec	2	3	4	9
4	British Columbia	2	2	2	6
5	Saskatchewan	1	0	0	1
6	Nova Scotia	0	2	0	2
7	Manitoba	0	1	2	3
Totals (7 entries)		14	14	14	42

==== Women ====
Rank	Nation	Gold	Silver	Bronze	Total
1	Ontario	4	1	0	5
2	Alberta	3	0	2	5
3	Quebec	1	4	3	8
4	British Columbia	0	1	1	2
4	Manitoba	0	1	1	2
4	Saskatchewan	0	1	1	2
Totals (6 entries)		8	8	8	24
