= Cody Hodgson =

Canadian ice hockey player (born 1990)

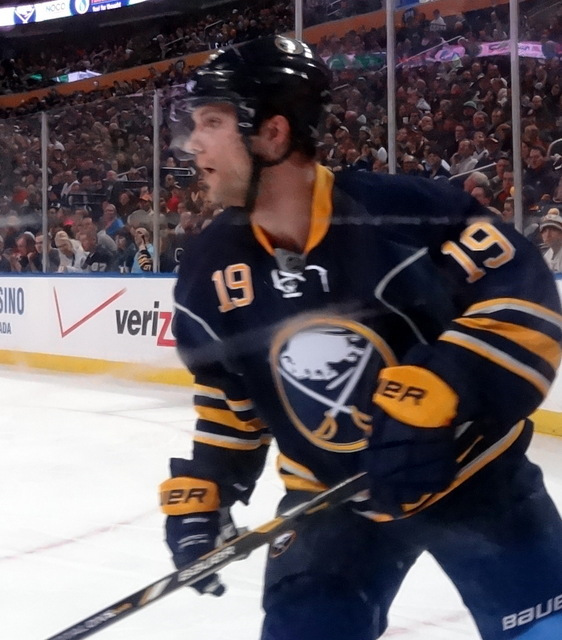
- Hodgson with the Buffalo Sabres in 2013
- Born: February 18, 1990 (age 36) Toronto, Ontario, Canada
- Height: 6 ft 0 in (183 cm)
- Weight: 185 lb (84 kg; 13 st 3 lb)
- Position: Centre
- Shot: Right
- Played for: Vancouver Canucks; Buffalo Sabres; Nashville Predators
- National team: Canada
- NHL draft: 10th overall, 2008; Vancouver Canucks
- Playing career: 2009–2024

Cody Douglas Hodgson (born February 18, 1990) is a Canadian former professional ice hockey player in the National Hockey League (NHL).

A centre, Hodgson played at the major junior level for four seasons with the Brampton Battalion of the Ontario Hockey League (OHL). After being selected tenth overall in the 2008 NHL entry draft by the Vancouver Canucks, Hodgson won the William Hanley Trophy (OHL's most sportsmanlike player), the Red Tilson Trophy (OHL player of the year), the CHL Player of the Year Award, and his first Team All-Star honours for the 2008–09 season. While training in the 2009 off-season, Hodgson suffered a back injury that required him to take an entire year off of hockey in order to fully recover. In 2010–11, he played his professional rookie season with the Canucks' minor league affiliate, the Manitoba Moose of the American Hockey League (AHL). The season also marked his debut at the NHL level with the Canucks and he went on to participate in the team's run to the 2011 Stanley Cup Finals. During his rookie season the subsequent year, Hodgson was dealt to the Buffalo Sabres at the 2012 trade deadline. He announced his retirement in 2016 after he was diagnosed with malignant hyperthermia. Hodgson came out of retirement in 2024 and signed a tryout with former club, the Milwaukee Admirals of the AHL. He made 13 appearances before ending his playing career.

Hodgson has represented Canada at two International Ice Hockey Federation (IIHF) – sanctioned events, winning gold and leading tournament scoring at both – the 2008 IIHF World U18 Championships and 2009 World Junior Ice Hockey Championships. In 2007, he won a gold medal with Ontario at the Canada Winter Games. He also represented Canada at the 2007 Ivan Hlinka Memorial Tournament, finishing fourth.

== Early life ==
Hodgson was born in Toronto, Ontario, to Marie and Chris Hodgson. His father is the president of the Ontario Mining Association and a former Ontario provincial Progressive Conservative cabinet minister in Premier Mike Harris' government, while his mother is the executive director of a day care. He has an older brother, Clayton, and two younger sisters. His sister Charlotte attends the University of Western Ontario and Caroline attends Belmont University in Nashville, Tennessee. Both girls played organized hockey in Markham, Ontario. Hodgson grew up in Haliburton, Ontario, with his family until they moved to Markham in 1998. The family would return in the summers to their cottage on Haliburton Lake.

Hodgson began playing organized hockey at age four in Haliburton. Playing for the Ontario Minor Hockey Association (OMHA)'s Haliburton Huskies, he was teammates with Matt Duchene. The two were childhood friends and played together throughout their minor and junior careers, including with the Brampton Battalion and on Canada's national under-18 and under-20 teams. His family was also friends with Jeff Skinner's family growing up in Markham. Hodgson played bantam hockey with the Toronto Jr. Canadiens of the Greater Toronto Hockey League (GTHL), captaining a team that included four other eventual 2008 NHL draftees – Alex Pietrangelo, Tyler Cuma, Josh Brittain and Stefan Della Rovere. His tenure with the team included a provincial championship. Hodgson then joined the OMHA's Markham Waxers, competing with their bantam team in 2004–05, then at the midget level in 2005–06. He recorded a 51-point campaign over 30 games in his midget season, while also recording one assist over two games with the club's Junior A side. During his tenure with the Waxers program, he played alongside future NHL players Steven Stamkos and Michael Del Zotto. Hodgson had also played alongside Stamkos on annual summer teams, starting at the age of 11.

Hodgson attended Buttonville Public School and Unionville High School in Markham, the latter of which he helped win numerous hockey tournaments. Following his draft by the Vancouver Canucks, Hodgson was accepted into the business program at York University for the 2008 fall semester. However, due to missing classes from his commitments to the Canucks' training camp and a subsequent university staff strike, he placed his academics on hiatus.

In December 2009, Hodgson was chosen to be the city of Markham's official torchbearer for the 2010 Winter Olympics in Vancouver. The torch passed through Markham on its way to Vancouver on December 17, 2009, on day 49 of the cross-country relay.

== Playing career ==
=== Brampton Battalion ===
Hodgson was drafted 17th overall by the Brampton Battalion in the 2006 OHL Priority Selection. The following season, he joined the Battalion wearing number 19 in honour of his favourite hockey player growing up, Steve Yzerman of the Detroit Red Wings. He led the team in rookie scoring with 23 goals and 46 points. He added four points in four playoff games as the Battalions were eliminated by the Barrie Colts in the first round.

In his second season with Brampton, Hodgson improved to 85 points in 68 games, which was second in team-scoring, behind centre John Hughes. He was chosen to the Eastern Conference squad in the 2008 OHL All-Star Classic and scored one goal. Hodgson added five goals in five playoff games, as Brampton was eliminated in the opening round for the second-straight season by Barrie.

Heading into the 2008 NHL Entry Draft, Hodgson was ranked ninth among North American skaters by the NHL Central Scouting Bureau. He went on to be chosen tenth overall by the Vancouver Canucks. Scouting reports and former coaches emphasized Hodgson's hockey sense and character, while Canucks General Manager Mike Gillis cited his leadership as a strong factor in drafting him. After the 2007–08 season, OHL coaches had voted him the smartest player in the Eastern Conference. As his skating was considered a weakness, he spent the subsequent off-season training to improve it.

Hodgson was expected to compete for a roster spot on the Canucks immediately after being drafted. He was then signed to a three-year, entry-level contract worth the rookie maximum of $2.625 million on October 5, 2008. However, the next day, he was sent back to Brampton for the 2008–09 season.

Upon his return, Hodgson was named the ninth captain in Battalion team history. He succeeded forward Thomas Stajan, who served as captain for the start of the season while Hodgson competed in the NHL pre-season. Stajan himself had just replaced defenceman John de Gray, who had turned professional.

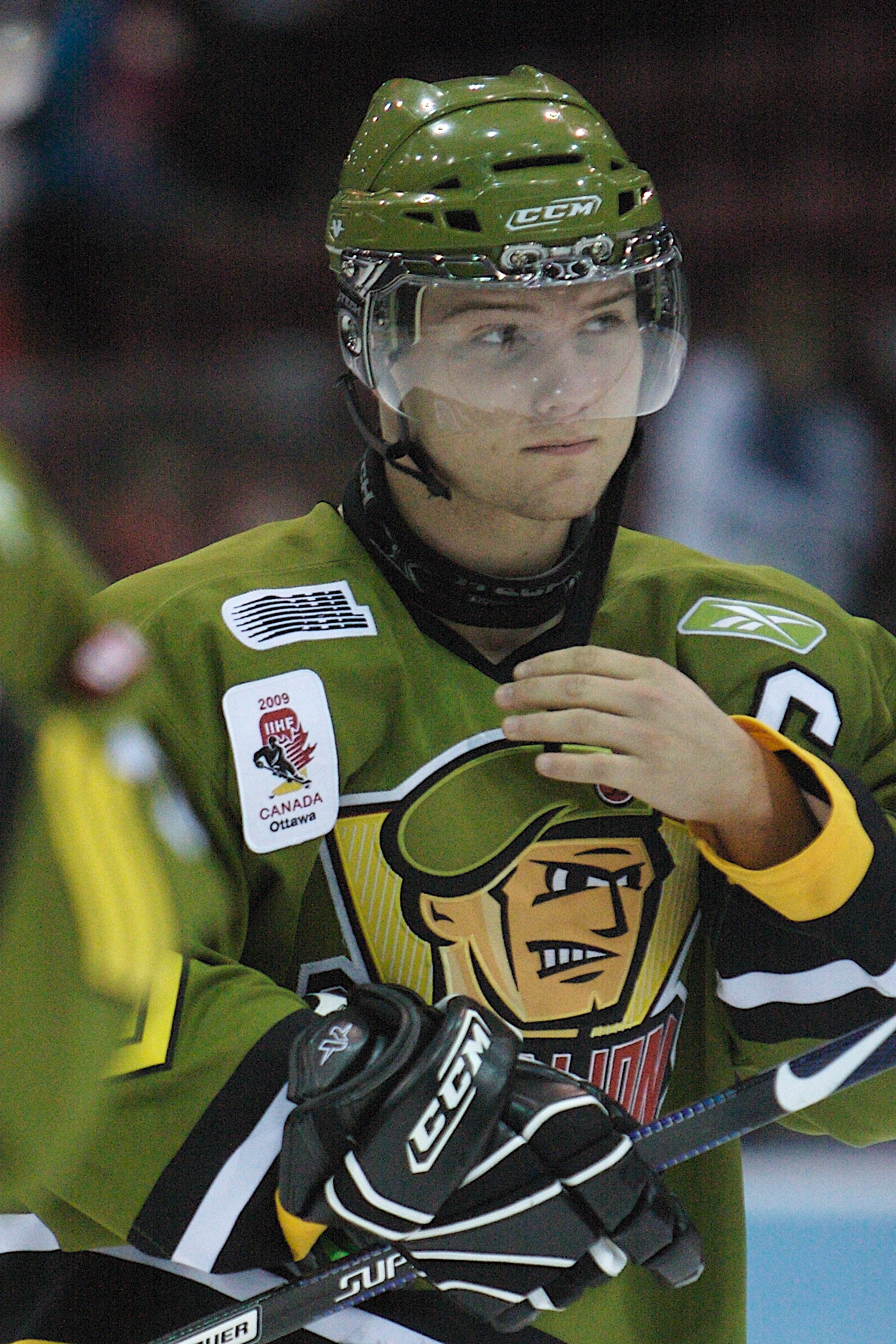
Hodgson with the Battalion in November 2008

Chosen to represent the OHL in the 2008 ADT Canada-Russia Challenge in November, Hodgson recorded a hat-trick and added an assist in the first of two games against Russia; he was chosen as game MVP. He went on to complete the month of November with 27 points in 13 games to be named OHL Player of the Month. Hodgson had also been chosen as the OHL Player of the Week for the week ending on November 9 after scoring nine points in three games. After a second Player of the Week recognition, scoring seven points in three games for the week ending February 1, 2009, Hodgson participated in the 2009 OHL All-Star Classic. Joined by teammates Matt Duchene, Evgeny Grachev and Thomas McCollum for the Eastern Conference, Hodgson received player of the game honours after a five-point effort in an 11–6 win. He recorded a hat-trick, along with Western Conference representative Justin DiBenedetto, to tie Scott Barney, who first scored three goals in 1999, for the OHL All-Star Game record. Hodgson's five points also tied the All-Star Game record for most points (shared by five others). He recorded another record later in the month with a 23-game point-scoring streak, registering 17 goals, 23 assists and 40 points in that span. The streak was both a Battalion club record and OHL season-high.

Hodgson finished the season with 43 goals and 92 points in 53 games, fourth in League scoring. The annual OHL coaches poll distinguished Hodgson as the smartest player (for the second consecutive season), the hardest worker, the best on faceoffs and the best penalty killer. In addition to OHL First All-Star Team honours, he was awarded both the William Hanley Trophy as the League's most sportsmanlike player and the Red Tilson Trophy as OHL player of the year. The media voted Hodgson ahead of forward John Tavares and goaltender Mike Murphy for the Tilson award. Hodgson was then distinguished over fellow major junior league MVP's Brett Sonne of the Western Hockey League (WHL) and Nicola Riopel of the Quebec Major Junior Hockey League (QMJHL) as the CHL Player of the Year.

Early in the subsequent playoff season, Hodgson received his second OHL Player of the Month recognition for March (26 points in 11 games). He helped the Battalion advance to the OHL Finals, where they lost the J. Ross Robertson Cup to the Windsor Spitfires. He led his team with 31 points in the post-season.

Following the Battalion's playoff elimination, Hodgson was assigned to the Canucks' American Hockey League (AHL) affiliate, the Manitoba Moose, for their 2009 playoff run. (Note: Junior-aged players are not eligible for AHL assignment until their junior team's season finishes.) Making his professional debut with the Moose in Game 1 of the semi-finals against the Houston Aeros, he notched an assist on the game's first goal for his first professional point. He followed up with his first professional goal the next night, a wrist shot against Aeros goaltender Nolan Schaefer, in a 5–2 victory. While Hodgson started on the fourth line for the Moose, he quickly moved his way up to the second line with fellow Canucks first-round pick Michael Grabner. Advancing past the Aeros, Moose Head Coach Scott Arniel chose not to play Hodgson in Game 4 of the Calder Cup Finals against the Hershey Bears. Arniel explained the decision was attributed to fatigue on Hodgson's part from a lengthy season in the juniors (including the 2009 World Juniors and a lengthy OHL playoff run). He returned the next game to help the Moose stave off elimination with a goal in a 3–2 Game 5 victory. Manitoba went on to lose the Calder Cup in Game 6 by a 4–1 score. Hodgson's assisted on the Moose's lone tally by Mário Bližňák.

Preparing for the Canucks' training camp for the 2009–10 season, Hodgson injured his back while working out in the summer. The injury, which was misdiagnosed as a bulging disc in his lower back, caused him to miss two months of summer training. After being cleared to play by Canucks team doctors on September 11, 2009, and a back specialist in Toronto, Hodgson was again expected to secure a roster spot during training camp. After struggling in six pre-season games, he was returned to the Brampton Battalion on September 29 in the final round of team cuts.

Hodgson subsequently sought a third opinion regarding his back at the Cleveland Clinic in Ohio. In response, then-Canucks Head Coach Alain Vigneault publicly speculated whether Hodgson was simply having a hard time being cut and was trying to "roll the [blame] in another direction." Despite having been cleared earlier to play in the pre-season by two sets of doctors, the Cleveland Clinic judged him unfit to play for a month. Previously undetected nerve damage in one leg was also revealed. Due to Hodgson's misdiagnosis, which was not corrected until a year later, subsequent treatment and rehabilitation was designed for a bulging disc, which further aggravated his real injury – a muscle strain.

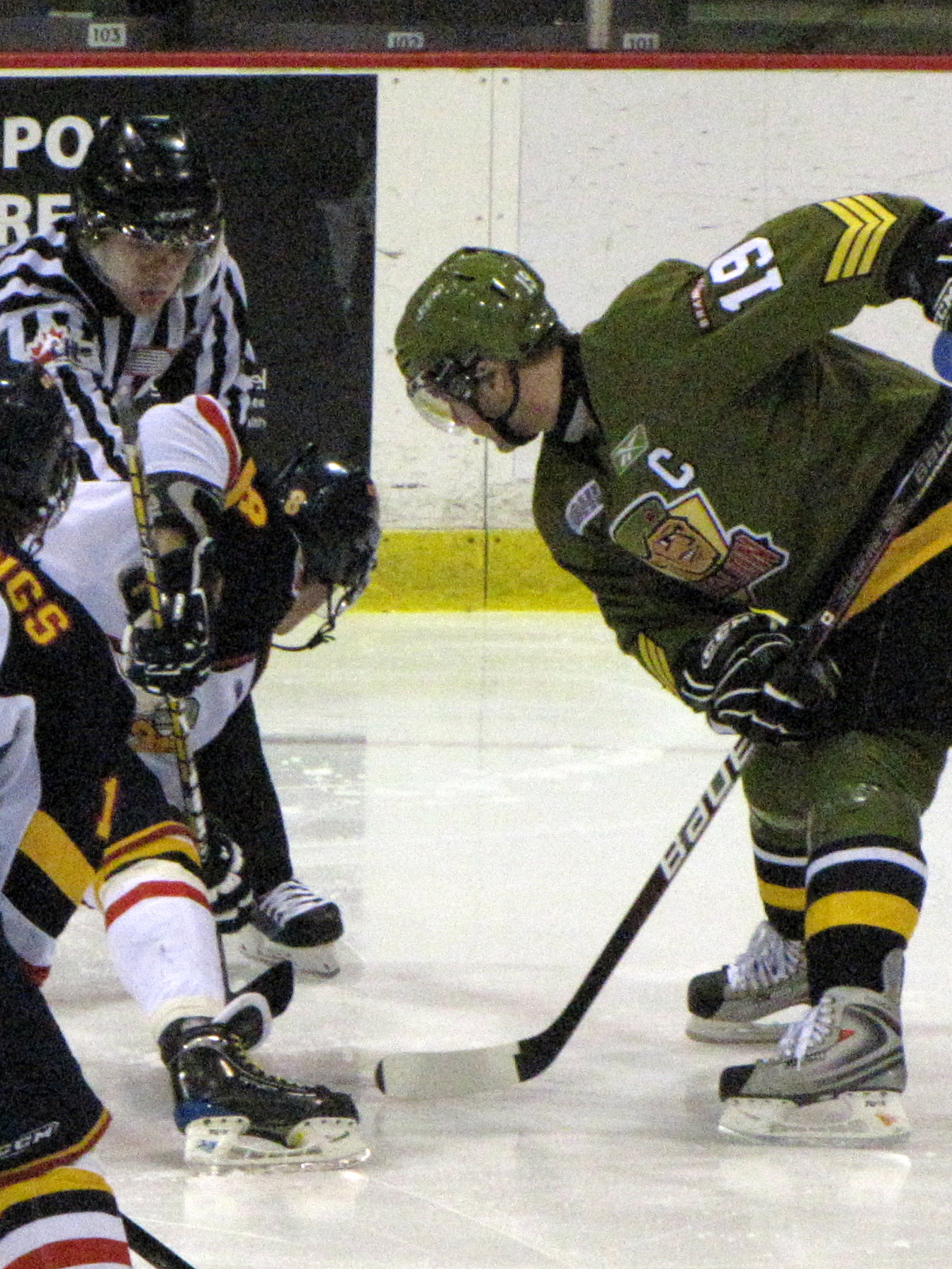
Hodgson (right) faces off during a game against the Barrie Colts.

After missing the first 50 games of the 2009–10 OHL season, Hodgson returned to the Battalion line-up on February 4, 2010, recording two assists in a 4–2 win against the Erie Otters. Following his return, he declared he would no longer be training in the off-season with Canucks Director of Player Development Dave Gagner, under whose supervision he suffered his back injury. Combined with the Canucks doctors' initial misdiagnosis and Vigneault's disparaging comments regarding Hodgson following the NHL pre-season, there was speculation in the media of a possible conflict between Hodgson and the Canucks organization. General Manager Mike Gillis, however, dismissed such speculation.

Eight days after his OHL return, Hodgson suffered another injury, breaking a toe on his right foot while blocking a shot against the Sudbury Wolves. Initial X-rays came up negative and he continued playing for nine more games before a second X-ray revealed a hairline fracture in one of his right metatarsal bones. Missing the Battalion's final five regular season games, he finished the campaign with eight goals and 20 points over 13 contests. Despite missing the majority of the season, he was voted as the smartest player in the Eastern Conference for the third consecutive year in the OHL coaches poll.

Hodgson returned to the Brampton line-up for the opening game of the 2010 playoffs, scoring the game-winning goal against the Kingston Frontenacs. In Game 5 of the series, he scored his 20th career playoff goal in the OHL, surpassing Wojtek Wolski for the all-time lead among Battalion players. The Battalion eliminated the Frontenacs in seven games before themselves being ousted in four games by Barrie in the second round. Hodgson completed the post-season with ten points in 11 games, second in team-scoring to Sean Jones. He admitted publicly after the playoffs that his health "was never 100 percent" during the 2009–10 season.

The Battalion's playoff elimination marked the end of Hodgson's four-year OHL career. He left Brampton ranked second on the club's all-time scoring list behind Wojtek Wolski in regular season goals (114), assists (129), points (243), powerplay goals (46) and shorthanded goals (7), while ranking first in game-winning goals (23). In playoff games, he left as the all-time leader in goals (20), assists (30) and points (50).

Following his 2009–10 OHL season, it was expected Hodgson would join the Manitoba Moose for a second consecutive AHL playoff season. However, after being assessed by Canucks team doctors, his broken toe was judged to have not yet fully healed and he was not cleared for AHL assignment. Hodgson additionally believed that he had re-injured his back while colliding head-first into the boards during Game 7 of the opening playoff round. He underwent an MRI in the off-season, which uncovered the misdiagnosed bulging disc to be a muscle strain instead. With the Canucks' consent, he trained in the off-season with former NHL player Gary Roberts, who had himself overcome a back injury during his career.

=== Vancouver Canucks ===
After challenging for a Canucks roster spot once again during the team's 2010 training camp, Hodgson was assigned to the Manitoba Moose. He scored his first regular season AHL goal against goaltender Peter Delmas of the Hamilton Bulldogs on October 22, 2010. With the score tied 3–3 after overtime, Hodgson added a shootout goal to help the Moose win the game. Later, in December 2010, Hodgson suffered a broken orbital bone after he was high-sticked by teammate Lee Sweatt during a Moose practice. Eight days after returning to Manitoba's line-up, Hodgson earned his first NHL call-up to Vancouver.

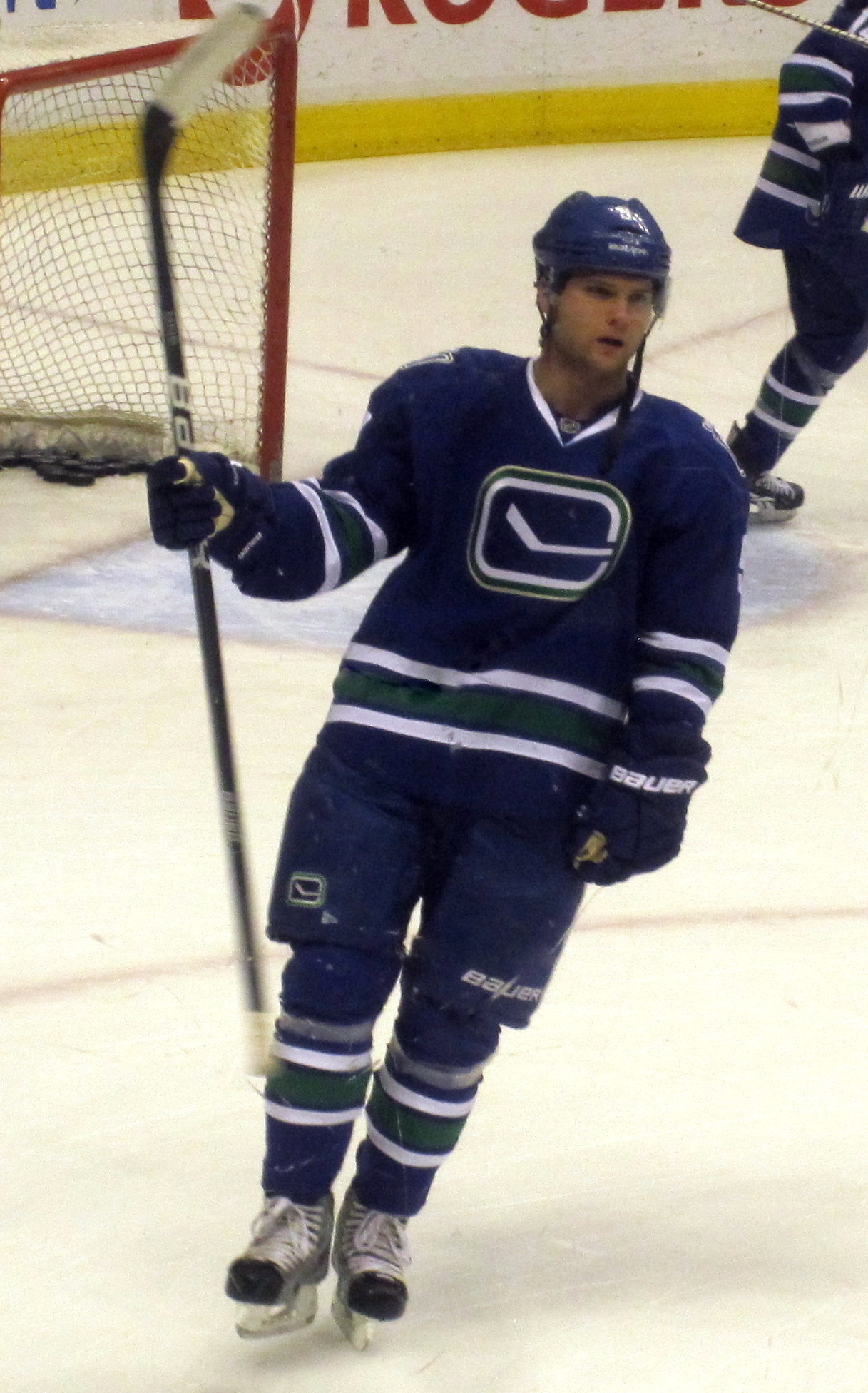
Hodgson with the Canucks in January 2012

Hodgson made his NHL debut on February 1, 2011, in a 4–1 win against the Dallas Stars. Centring the fourth line and playing on the second powerplay unit, he registered two shots in over nine minutes of ice time. The following day, he scored his first career NHL goal against Ilya Bryzgalov in a 6–0 win against the Phoenix Coyotes. In his third game, he recorded his first career NHL assist on a goal by Christian Ehrhoff against the Chicago Blackhawks; Vancouver won 4–3. After appearing in his first five NHL games, Hodgson was returned to the Moose on February 11. Team management explained to the media his call-up was a means to introduce him to NHL play and that they were more comfortable having him continue developing in the AHL with first-line minutes and a bigger role with the Moose. However, with the team's fourth-line centre role unfilled (Alain Vigneault had been using natural winger Tanner Glass in that position), he was called back to Vancouver within ten days. Hodgson played three more games for the Canucks before the team acquired fourth-line centre Maxim Lapierre from the Anaheim Ducks at the trade deadline on February 28. Hodgson was subsequently sent back down to Manitoba. He completed his professional rookie season with 30 points in 52 AHL games – ranking fifth in Moose scoring – and two points in eight NHL games.

At the end of the regular season, Hodgson was called up to the Canucks for the 2011 playoffs. He registered his first NHL playoff point in Game 2 of the opening round against the Chicago Blackhawks, assisting on a goal by defenceman Alexander Edler in a 4–3 win. Hodgson drew in and out of the line-up throughout the post-season, appearing in 12 of the Canucks' 25-game playoff run, which ended in a Game 7 loss to the Boston Bruins in the Stanley Cup Finals.

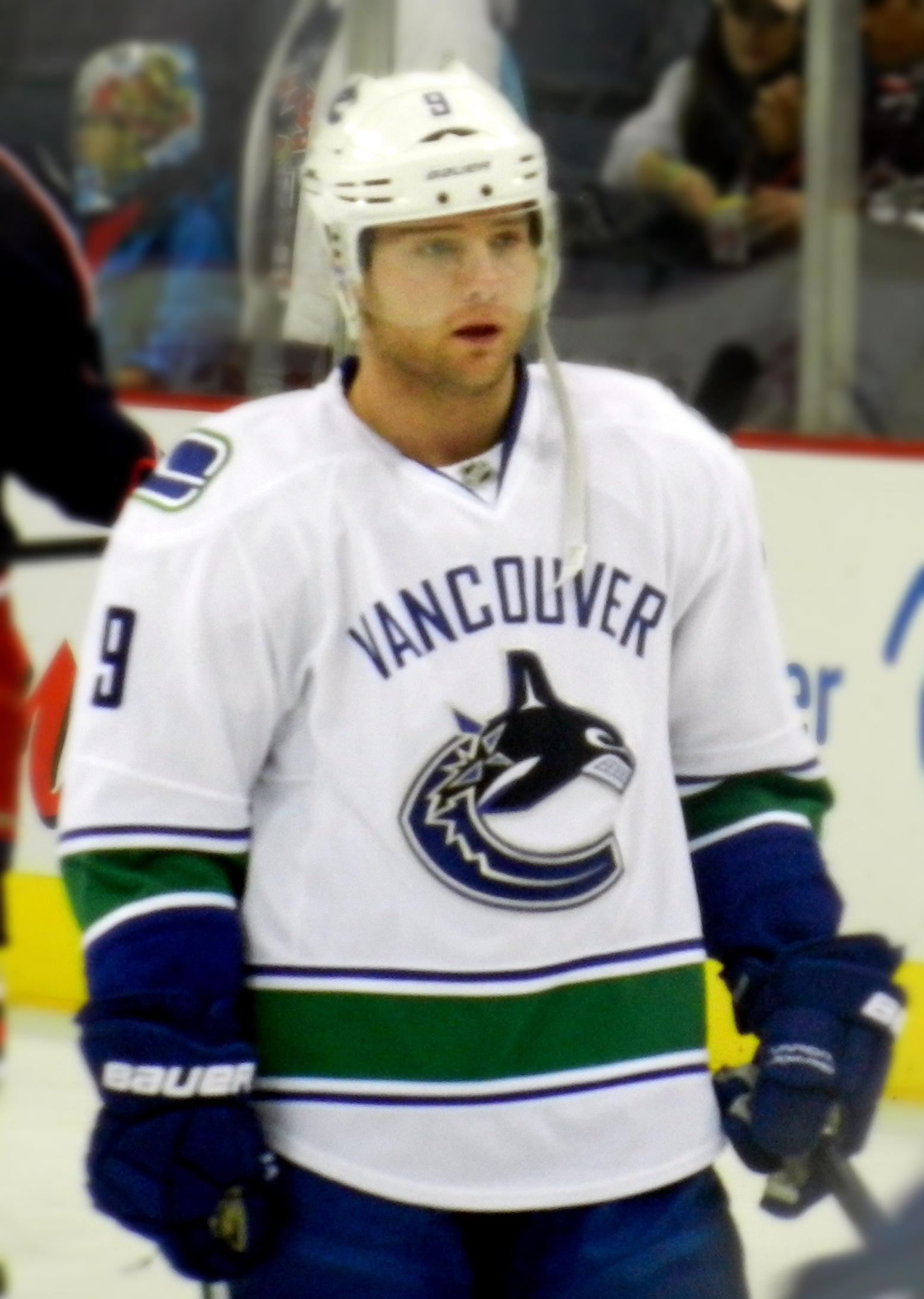
Hodgson with the Vancouver Canucks in December 2011

During the off-season, Canucks centre Ryan Kesler underwent hip surgery, sidelining him for the start of the 2011–12 campaign. With the centre position on the second line vacant, Hodgson competed with the newly acquired Andrew Ebbett to temporarily replace Kesler. After being cut in his previous three training camps with the team, Hodgson emerged with the second-line position to start the season. After wearing 39 on his jersey the previous season as a rookie, (Note: Hodgson also wore 39 at the beginning of his first season with the Moose, before switching to 14.) Hodgson switched to 9, a number historically associated in the NHL with high-profile players. He had previously spoken to team trainers regarding the number, but decided having the number is "something you have to earn [by] mak[ing] the team first." When Kesler returned to the team's line-up six games into the season, Hodgson was moved to the right wing to remain on the second line, before settling in as the team's third-line centre. On December 10, 2011, Hodgson left a game against the Ottawa Senators after a hit from opposing forward Nick Foligno left him unsteadily skating back to the bench. Hodgson was reportedly uninjured, as Vigneault told media he was kept out of the contest for precautionary measures.

Ranking fifth among NHL rookies in scoring by January 2012, he was selected as one of 12 first-year players to participate in the NHL All-Star Game SuperSkills Competition in Ottawa, Ontario. He was designated to Team Chara during the All-Star Draft and went on to participate in one SuperSkills event, the shooting accuracy segment. Hitting all four targets in 20.929 seconds, he lost the rookie heat to Matt Read of the Philadelphia Flyers, who had a time of 14.011 seconds. Hodgson's time ranked fifth among the eight players who participated in the event. Canucks teammates Henrik Sedin, Daniel Sedin and Alexander Edler joined Hodgson in Ottawa as NHL All-Stars, though they competed against him in the SuperSkills Competition as part of Team Alfredsson. Following the NHL All-Star weekend, Hodgson was named the League's Rookie of the Month for January after having recorded ten points (six goals and four assists) over 11 games, first among Canucks and NHL first-year players.

Playing behind Henrik Sedin and Ryan Kesler on the Canucks' depth chart at centre, Hodgson earned limited ice-time with the Canucks. By mid-season, his success as a rookie led many in the media to question the 10–12 minutes of ice time Alain Vigneault routinely allotted him per game.

=== Buffalo Sabres ===
Minutes before the NHL trade deadline on February 27, 2012, Hodgson was dealt, along with defenceman Alexander Sulzer, to the Buffalo Sabres in exchange for fellow rookie forward Zack Kassian and defenceman Marc-André Gragnani. Canucks General Manager Mike Gillis acknowledged the trade as an effort to balance his team out by trading Hodgson's skill and finesse in return for Kassian's size and toughness. Analysts from TSN and The Vancouver Sun also echoed the sentiment, commenting that while the Canucks gained elements in Kassian that were required to succeed in the playoffs, Hodgson's skill set reflected the style of play that Vancouver's success was based upon.

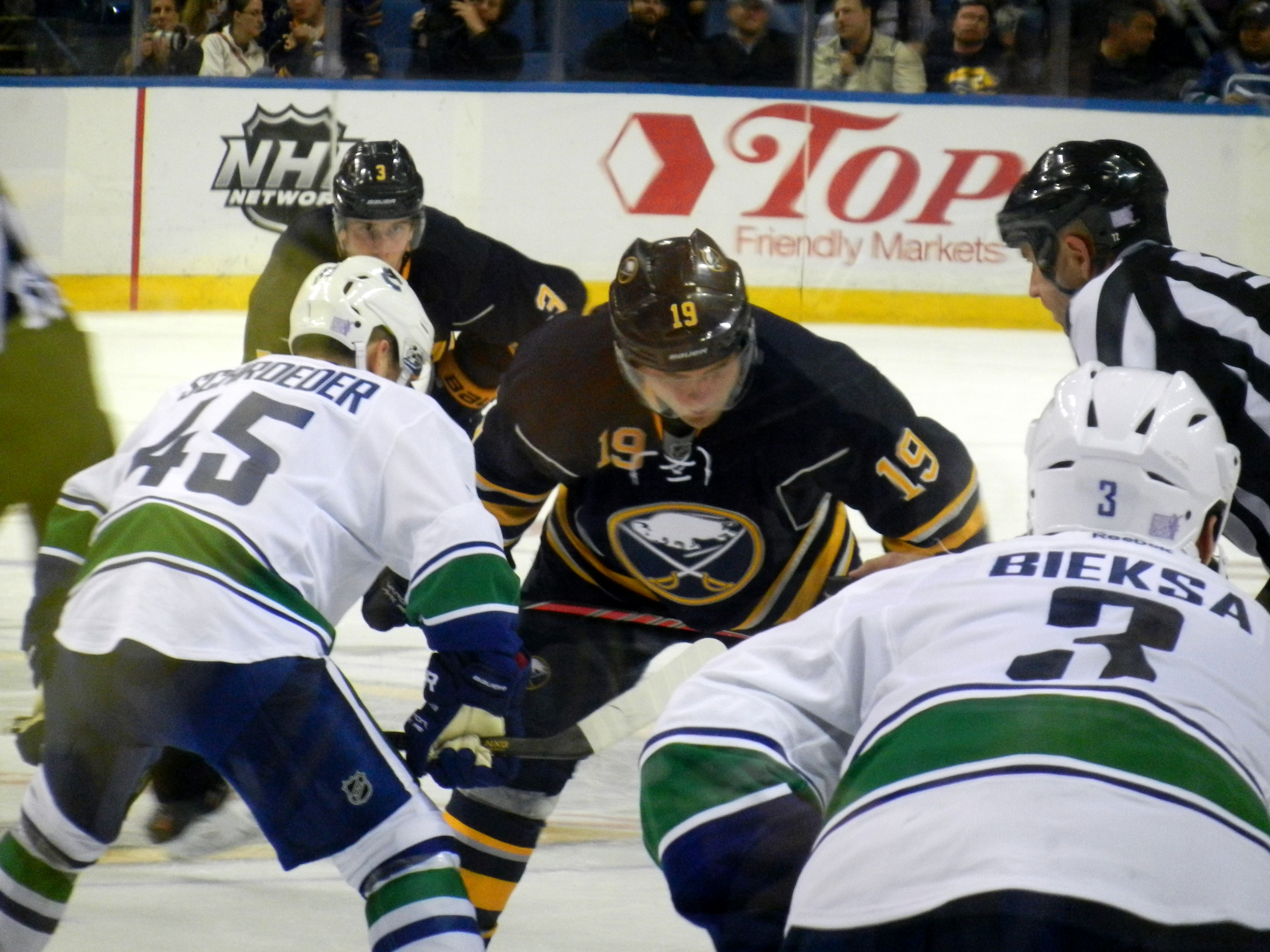
Hodgson taking a faceoff against Jordan Schroeder

In a telephone interview with TSN shortly after the trade, Hodgson told reporters he was "in shock," adding that "It's tough to leave Vancouver." There were, however, reports in the media that Hodgson had asked for a trade from the Canucks, an allegation that Mike Gillis neither confirmed nor denied. The reaction in the Vancouver media was largely of surprise that Gillis would trade away a well-performing rookie. Vancouver Sun columnist Iain MacIntyre declared it "a stunner" and "one of the most unpopular trades in Vancouver in years." Another Sun article likened the deal to a lopsided 1996 trade between the Canucks and Pittsburgh Penguins in which two first-round prospects of opposite playing styles – the skilled Markus Näslund and the larger, more aggressive Alek Stojanov – were exchanged. Näslund went on to become the Canucks' all-time leading goal- and point-scorer, while the latter had a short career in the minor leagues.

Hodgson made his Sabres debut two days after the trade, registering four shots on goal and 16 minutes of ice time in a 2–0 win against the Anaheim Ducks. After going pointless in his first ten games with Buffalo, Hodgson recorded two assists in a 7–3 win against the Tampa Bay Lightning on March 19. Two nights later, he scored his first two goals as a Sabre in a game against the Montreal Canadiens. Leaving Vancouver gave Hodgson a larger on-ice role, earning nearly five minutes more ice time per game as a Sabre. Completing his first NHL season with the Sabres, he finished with 41 points (19 goals and 22 assists) over 83 games. He ranked fifth in League rookie scoring and first in power play goals (7), despite earning less ice time than his first-year peers (his 13 minutes and 49 seconds per game averaged the least among the top 14 rookie scorers). As a team, the Sabres then failed to qualify for the 2012 playoffs, finishing ninth in the Eastern Conference. Hodgson was assigned to the AHL's Rochester Americans immediately before the 2012–13 NHL lock-out took effect.

Hodgson signed a six-year, $25.5 million extension with the Sabres on September 11, 2013.

In the second year of his contract extension with the Sabres in the 2014–15 season, Hodgson suffered the worst season in his professional career, contributing with just 6 goals and 13 points in 78 outings for the cellar-dwelling Sabres. With the option to buy-out his contract at a lower rate due to his age, on June 29, 2015, the Sabres, in the midst of a rebuild, placed Hodgson on unconditional waivers in order for a release to free agency.

=== Nashville Predators and retirement ===
On the opening day of free agency, Hodgson signed a one-year contract with the Nashville Predators. Hodgson made the opening night roster of the Predators to begin the 2015–16 season. He was used primarily in a depth role, centering the fourth-line. After posting 8 points in 39 games, Hodgson was placed on waivers by the Predators on January 13, 2016. Hodgson passed through waivers unclaimed and was subsequently assigned to AHL affiliate, the Milwaukee Admirals the following day. Hodgson was not offered a new contract by the club, and became an unrestricted free agent on July 1. On October 3, it was announced that Hodgson had retired and would be working within the Predators organization, coaching for their Little Preds Learn to Play Program.

In 2017, Hodgson revealed he had retired after having been diagnosed with malignant hyperthermia. The disease, caused by a mutation of his RYR1 gene, significantly worsened his performance in his final seasons and was only correctly diagnosed after his last season, which he described as "a literal struggle." It is normally triggered by anesthesia, but in Hodgson's case was triggered by the prolonged exertion of playing hockey. He partnered with the RYR-1 Foundation in creating a documentary to raise awareness of the disease.

=== Comeback and second retirement ===
On January 13, 2024, Elliotte Friedman reported that Hodgson was interested in attempting a comeback to professional hockey. On January 17, Hodgson was signed to a professional tryout with the Milwaukee Admirals. Hodgson returned to professional hockey on January 24, but broke a rib during the first period of play. On February 22, Hodgson scored his first goal since his comeback, scoring the final goal in a 4–0 victory. Hodgson would end up netting goals in 4 straight games, including a 2-goal performance in a 4–2 loss to the Rockford IceHogs on March 1.

On May 2, 2024, Hodgson ended his comeback attempt and retired from professional hockey for the second time.

== International play ==
Medal record

Ice hockey

Representing Canada

World Junior Championships
Gold medal – first place	2009 Ottawa	

World U18 Championships
Gold medal – first place	2008 Kazan	

Hodgson first competed internationally for Canada at the 2007 Ivan Hlinka Memorial Tournament in Hodonín, Czech Republic, and Piešťany, Slovakia. Although favoured to win the tournament, Canada finished in fourth place. He scored two goals in the 5–4 bronze medal game loss to Russia. In total, Hodgson contributed a team-high five points in four games, tied with Steven Stamkos. Hodgson also represented Ontario later that year at the 2007 Canada Winter Games, winning gold over Manitoba 6–4 in the gold medal game.

Hodgson next represented Canada at the 2008 IIHF World U18 Championships in Kazan, Russia. Playing in the quarter-finals against Finland, Hodgson was named player of the game after scoring the game-winning goal in a 2–1 victory. Hodgson finished with a tournament-high 12 points in seven games, leading Canada as team captain to its second IIHF World U18 gold medal with an 8–0 victory over tournament host Russia. He was chosen as one of Canada's three top players by tournament coaches, along with forward Jordan Eberle and goaltender Jake Allen.

In his third year of junior, Hodgson was selected to compete in the 2009 World Junior Championships with Team Canada in Ottawa. He was chosen as an alternate captain to defenceman Thomas Hickey. In the second round-robin game against Kazakhstan, Hodgson accumulated six points (two goals and four assists), coming within one point of the single-game Canadian record held by Michael Cammalleri and Dave Andreychuk. In the following round-robin game against the United States, he scored the game-winning goal in a 7–4 win to lead Team Canada to first place in their pool and a bye to the semi-finals. Facing Sweden in the final game, Hodgson scored two goals – one on the powerplay and an empty-netter – and one assist to overtake John Tavares as the tournament leading scorer with five goals and 11 assists for 16 points in six games. Team Canada defeated Sweden 5–1 to capture the gold medal while Hodgson was named to the Tournament All-Star Team. Returning from the tournament, Hodgson was asked to drop the ceremonial faceoff for a Toronto Maple Leafs game against the Florida Panthers on January 6, 2009.

Leading up to the 2010 World Junior Championships in Saskatchewan, Hodgson was named to Team Canada's selection camp roster on December 2, 2009, despite not yet playing in an OHL game during the 2009–10 season due to a back injury. However, he notified Hockey Canada five days later that his back was not yet ready and that he would not participate in the selection camp.

== Career statistics ==
=== Regular season and playoffs ===
			Regular season					Playoffs
Season	Team	League	GP	G	A	Pts	PIM	GP	G	A	Pts	PIM
2004–05	Markham Waxers AAA	ETA U15	59	51	48	99	36	—	—	—	—	—
2004–05	Markham Waxers	OPJHL	2	0	1	1	0	—	—	—	—	—
2005–06	Markham Waxers AAA	ETA U18	30	27	24	51	22	15	13	14	27	8
2006–07	Brampton Battalion	OHL	63	23	23	46	24	4	1	3	4	0
2007–08	Brampton Battalion	OHL	68	40	45	85	36	5	5	0	5	0
2008–09	Brampton Battalion	OHL	53	43	49	92	33	21	11	20	31	18
2008–09	Manitoba Moose	AHL	—	—	—	—	—	11	2	4	6	4
2009–10	Brampton Battalion	OHL	13	8	12	20	9	11	3	7	10	4
2010–11	Manitoba Moose	AHL	52	17	13	30	14	—	—	—	—	—
2010–11	Vancouver Canucks	NHL	8	1	1	2	0	12	0	1	1	2
2011–12	Vancouver Canucks	NHL	63	16	17	33	8	—	—	—	—	—
2011–12	Buffalo Sabres	NHL	20	3	5	8	2	—	—	—	—	—
2012–13	Rochester Americans	AHL	19	5	14	19	10	—	—	—	—	—
2012–13	Buffalo Sabres	NHL	48	15	19	34	20	—	—	—	—	—
2013–14	Buffalo Sabres	NHL	72	20	24	44	20	—	—	—	—	—
2014–15	Buffalo Sabres	NHL	78	6	7	13	12	—	—	—	—	—
2015–16	Nashville Predators	NHL	39	3	5	8	6	—	—	—	—	—
2015–16	Milwaukee Admirals	AHL	14	4	7	11	0	—	—	—	—	—
2023–24	Milwaukee Admirals	AHL	13	6	2	8	6	—	—	—	—	—
NHL totals			328	64	78	142	68	12	0	1	1	2

=== International ===
Year	Team	Event	GP	G	A	Pts	PIM
2007	Canada	IH18	4	3	2	5	4
2008	Canada	WJC18	7	2	10	12	8
2009	Canada	WJC	6	5	11	16	2
2014	Canada	WC	8	6	2	8	4
Junior totals			17	10	23	33	14
Senior totals			8	6	2	8	4

== Awards ==
Award	Year(s)
Major junior
OHL Player of the Week	November 2–7, 2008; January 25 – February 1, 2009.
ADT Canada-Russia Challenge Player of the Game	Game 3, 2008
OHL Player of the Month	November 2008, March 2009
OHL All-Star Classic Player of the Game	2009
William Hanley Trophy (OHL's Most Sportsmanlike)	2009
Red Tilson Trophy (OHL's Most Outstanding Player)	2009
OHL First All-Star Team	2009
CHL Player of the Year	2009
NHL
Rookie of the Month	January 2012
All-Star Game (rookie)	2012
International
World Junior Championships All-Star Team	2009
Other
Brampton Sports Hall of Fame	May 27, 2009

== Records ==
- OHL All-Star Classic record; most goals, single-game (3) in 2009 (tied with Justin DiBenedetto, 2009; and Scott Barney, 1999)
- OHL All-Star Classic record; most points, single-game (5) in 2009 (tied with five others)
- Brampton Battalion franchise record; point-scoring streak (23 games) in 2008–09 (17 goals, 23 assists, 40 points)
- Brampton Battalion franchise record; most game-winning goals, all-time (23)
- Brampton Battalion franchise record; most playoff goals, all-time (20)
- Brampton Battalion franchise record; most playoff assists, all-time (30)
- Brampton Battalion franchise record; most playoff points, all-time (50)

== Notes ==
Awards and achievements
Preceded by Nick Spaling	William Hanley Trophy; 2009	Succeeded by Ryan Spooner
Preceded by Justin Azevedo	Red Tilson Trophy; 2009	Succeeded by Tyler Seguin
Preceded by Justin Azevedo	CHL Player of the Year; 2009	Succeeded by Jordan Eberle
Sporting positions
Preceded by Patrick White	Vancouver Canucks first-round draft pick 2008	Succeeded by Jordan Schroeder
Preceded by Thomas Stajan	Brampton Battalion captain 2008–10	Succeeded by Stephon Thorne
