= Ice hockey at the 2015 Canada Winter Games – Men's tournament =

2015 Canada Winter Games

Tournament details
- Venues: 3 (in 1 host city)
- Dates: February 22–March 1
- Teams: 12

Final positions
- Champions: Ontario (5th title)
- Runners-up: Alberta
- Third place: Manitoba
- Fourth place: Quebec

Tournament statistics
- Games played: 36
- Goals scored: 277 (7.69 per game)
- Scoring leader: Jeremy McKenna (23 points)

The men's tournament in ice hockey at the 2015 Canada Winter Games was held in Prince George, British Columbia between February 22 and March 1, 2015. Twelve provinces and territories competed in the tournament, with all but Nunavut participating.

The tournament was played among an under-16 age group. Ontario won the gold medal, defeating Alberta 3-1 in the final.

== Preliminary round ==
All times are local (UTC−8).

Key

Provinces/Territories qualified for the quarter-finals round are in green
Provinces/Territories qualified for the qualification round are in lavender blue

=== Group A ===
Team	Pld	W	OTW	OTL	L	GF	GA	GD	Pts
Ontario	3	3	0	0	0	17	7	+10	9
Manitoba	3	2	0	0	1	12	9	+3	6
British Columbia	3	1	0	0	2	11	14	−3	3
New Brunswick	3	0	0	0	3	5	15	−10	0

Source: https://www.hockeycanada.ca/national-championships/men/canada-winter-games/2015/stats/schedule

February 22, 2015; 16:00	Manitoba	3–5 (0–1, 1–2, 2–2)	Ontario	CN Centre, Prince George

Game reference
Dylan Myskiw	Goalies	Brendan Bonello
2 min	Penalties	4 min
43	Shots	29

February 22, 2015; 19:30	New Brunswick	3–5 (1–1, 2–1, 0–3)	British Columbia	CN Centre, Prince George

Game reference
Jack Ryan	Goalies	Jordan Hollett
6 min	Penalties	8 min
24	Shots	40

February 23, 2015; 16:00	New Brunswick	0–6 (0–1, 0–1, 0–4)	Ontario	CN Centre, Prince George

Game reference
Jacob Stewart	Goalies	Michael DiPietro
12 min	Penalties	10 min
17	Shots	34

February 23, 2015; 19:30	British Columbia	2–5 (0–1, 2–3, 0–1)	Manitoba	CN Centre, Prince George

Game reference
Dorrin Sekikawa-Luding; Jordan Hollett	Goalies	Matthew Radomsky
24 min	Penalties	21 min
28	Shots	20

February 24, 2015; 16:00	New Brunswick	2–4 (0–1, 1–1, 1–2)	Manitoba	CN Centre, Prince George

Game reference
Jack Ryan	Goalies	Dylan Myskiw
16 min	Penalties	14 min
22	Shots	33

February 24, 2015; 19:30	Ontario	6–4 (2–1, 1–1, 3–2)	British Columbia	CN Centre, Prince George

Game reference
Brendan Bonello	Goalies	Jordan Hollett
6 min	Penalties	16 min
40	Shots	39

=== Group B ===
Team	Pld	W	OTW	OTL	L	GF	GA	GD	Pts
Alberta	3	3	0	0	0	14	9	+5	9
Quebec	3	2	0	0	1	12	7	+5	6
Nova Scotia	3	0	1	0	2	7	12	−5	2
Saskatchewan	3	0	0	1	2	3	8	−5	1

Source: https://www.hockeycanada.ca/national-championships/men/canada-winter-games/2015/stats/schedule

February 22, 2015; 16:00	Saskatchewan	1–4 (0–3, 0–1, 1–0)	Alberta	Kin 2, Prince George

Game reference
Joel Grzybowski	Goalies	Ian Scott
6 min	Penalties	14 min
23	Shots	45

February 22, 2015; 19:30	Nova Scotia	1–6 (0–2, 0–1, 1–3)	Quebec	Kin 2, Prince George

Game reference
Matthew Welsh	Goalies	Alex D'Orio
12 min	Penalties	10 min
15	Shots	43

February 23, 2015; 16:00	Nova Scotia	4–5 (1–3, 2–2, 1–0)	Alberta	Kin 2, Prince George

Game reference
Kirklin Allen	Goalies	Dane Dow
11 min	Penalties	14 min
26	Shots	26

February 23, 2015; 19:30	Quebec	2–1 (2–0, 0–0, 0–1)	Saskatchewan	Kin 2, Prince George

Game reference
Dereck Baribeau	Goalies	Joel Grzybowski
14 min	Penalties	14 min
20	Shots	22

February 24, 2015; 16:00	Nova Scotia	2–1 SO (0–0, 0–1, 1–0, 0-0) (SO: 4–3)	Saskatchewan	Kin 2, Prince George

Game reference
Matthew Welsh	Goalies	Joel Grzybowski
10 min	Penalties	22 min
20	Shots	36

February 24, 2015; 19:30	Alberta	5–4 (2–0, 2–3, 1–1)	Quebec	Kin 2, Prince George

Game reference
Ian Scott	Goalies	Alex D'Orio
12 min	Penalties	22 min
31	Shots	26

=== Group C ===
Team	Pld	W	OTW	OTL	L	GF	GA	GD	Pts
Prince Edward Island	3	3	0	0	0	34	1	+33	9
Newfoundland and Labrador	3	2	0	0	1	23	9	+14	6
Yukon	3	1	0	0	2	10	26	−16	3
Northwest Territories	3	0	0	0	3	2	33	−31	0

Source: https://www.hockeycanada.ca/national-championships/men/canada-winter-games/2015/stats/schedule

February 22, 2015; 16:00	Northwest Territories	0–11 (0–2, 0–4, 0–5)	Newfoundland and Labrador	Kin 3, Prince George

Game reference
Danie Enge	Goalies	Matthew Normore
6 min	Penalties	2 min
13	Shots	57

February 22, 2015; 19:30	Yukon	0–13 (0–4, 0–3, 1–6)	Prince Edward Island	Kin 3, Prince George

Game reference
Ethan Vanderkley	Goalies	Luke Oliver
6 min	Penalties	10 min
15	Shots	62

February 23, 2015; 12:30	Prince Edward Island	14–0 (6–0, 3–0, 5–0)	Northwest Territories	Kin 2, Prince George

Game reference
Noah Laybolt	Goalies	Ethan Carey
8 min	Penalties	4 min
56	Shots	10

February 23, 2015; 12:30	Yukon	2–11 (0–3, 1–4, 1–4)	Newfoundland and Labrador	CN Centre, Prince George

Game reference
Ethan Vanderkley	Goalies	Zachary Rose
8 min	Penalties	12 min
23	Shots	51

February 24, 2015; 12:30	Newfoundland and Labrador	1–7 (1–2, 0–4, 0–1)	Prince Edward Island	CN Centre, Prince George

Game reference
Zachary Rose; Matthew Normore	Goalies	Luke Oliver
18 min	Penalties	18 min
15	Shots	29

February 24, 2015; 12:30	Northwest Territories	2–8 (1–4, 1–2, 0–2)	Yukon	Kin 2, Prince George

Game reference
Ethan Carey	Goalies	Tynan Hope
20 min	Penalties	14 min
18	Shots	50

== Playoff round ==
=== Bracket ===
Qualifying
February 25
Newfoundland and Labrador	1
Saskatchewan	4
February 25
Prince Edward Island	1
New Brunswick	5

Quarterfinals
February 26
Ontario	9
Saskatchewan	0
February 26
Quebec	6
British Columbia	3
February 26
Manitoba	4
Nova Scotia	1
February 26
Alberta	6
New Brunswick	1

Semifinals
February 27
Ontario	5
Quebec	2
February 27
Manitoba	1
Alberta	3

Gold medal game
March 1
Ontario	3
Alberta	1
Bronze medal game
February 28
Quebec	3
Manitoba	5

Fifth place bracket

5–8th place semifinals
February 27
British Columbia	5
New Brunswick	3
February 27
Saskatchewan	1
Nova Scotia	5

Fifth place game
February 28
British Columbia	2
Nova Scotia	3
Seventh place game
February 28
New Brunswick	2
Saskatchewan	3

Ninth place bracket

9–12th place semifinals
February 26
Newfoundland and Labrador	7
Yukon	3
February 26
Northwest Territories	1
Prince Edward Island	13

Ninth place game
February 27
Newfoundland and Labrador	5
Prince Edward Island	6
Eleventh place game
February 27
Yukon	4
Northwest Territories	1

=== Qualifying round ===
February 25, 2015; 16:00	Prince Edward Island	1–5 (0–3, 0–0, 1–2)	New Brunswick	CN Centre, Prince George

Game reference
Luke Oliver	Goalies	Jacob Stewart
16 min	Penalties	18 min
25	Shots	44

February 25, 2015; 16:30	Newfoundland and Labrador	1–4 (0–2, 0–0, 1–2)	Saskatchewan	Kin 2, Prince George

Game reference
Zachary Rose	Goalies	Hunter Arps
18 min	Penalties	30 min
27	Shots	31

=== 9–12th place placement round ===
February 26, 2015; 12:30	Northwest Territories	1–13 (1–7, 0–1, 0–5)	Prince Edward Island	Kin 2, Prince George

Game reference
Ethan Carey; Danie Enge	Goalies	Noah Laybolt
8 min	Penalties	8 min
12	Shots	55

February 26, 2015; 12:30	Yukon	3–7 (0–1, 2–2, 1–4)	Newfoundland and Labrador	CN Centre, Prince George

Game reference
Ethan Vanderkley	Goalies	Matthew Normore
10 min	Penalties	8 min
18	Shots	47

=== Quarterfinals ===
February 26, 2015; 16:00	Nova Scotia	1–4 (0–0, 0–3, 1–1)	Manitoba	CN Centre, Prince George

Game reference
Matthew Welsh	Goalies	Dylan Myskiw
4 min	Penalties	8 min
23	Shots	36

February 26, 2015; 16:00	New Brunswick	1–6 (0–1, 0–3, 1–2)	Alberta	Kin 2, Prince George

Game reference
Jack Ryan	Goalies	Ian Scott
16 min	Penalties	14 min
29	Shots	36

February 26, 2015; 19:30	British Columbia	3–6 (2–1, 0–4, 1–1)	Quebec	Kin 2, Prince George

Game reference
Jordan Hollett; Dorrin Sekikawa-Luding	Goalies	Dereck Baribeau
8 min	Penalties	4 min
30	Shots	33

February 26, 2015; 19:30	Saskatchewan	0–9 (0–4, 0–3, 0–2)	Ontario	CN Centre, Prince George

Game reference
Joel Grzybowski; Hunter Arps	Goalies	Michael DiPietro
22 min	Penalties	12 min
24	Shots	49

=== Eleventh place game ===
February 27, 2015; 12:30	Yukon	4–1 (0–0, 3–1, 1–0)	Northwest Territories	CN Centre, Prince George

Game reference
Tynan Hope	Goalies	Danie Enge
43 min	Penalties	20 min
37	Shots	29

=== Ninth place game ===
February 27, 2015; 12:30	Prince Edward Island	6–5 OT (1–2, 1–1, 3–2) (OT: 1–0)	Newfoundland and Labrador	Kin 2, Prince George

Game reference
Luke Oliver	Goalies	Zachary Rose
16 min	Penalties	24 min
48	Shots	27

=== 5–8th place placement round ===
February 27, 2015; 16:00	British Columbia	5–3 (1–0, 1–3, 3–0)	New Brunswick	Kin 2, Prince George

Game reference
Jordan Hollett	Goalies	Jacob Stewart
16 min	Penalties	12 min
36	Shots	27

February 27, 2015; 19:30	Nova Scotia	5–1 (2–1, 2–0, 1–0)	Saskatchewan	Kin 2, Prince George

Game reference
Matthew Welsh	Goalies	Joel Grzybowski
10 min	Penalties	14 min
36	Shots	25

=== 7th place game ===
February 28, 2015; 16:00	New Brunswick	2–3 (1–2, 1–1, 0–0)	Saskatchewan	Kin 2, Prince George

Game reference
Jack Ryan	Goalies	Hunter Arps
12 min	Penalties	14 min
27	Shots	28

=== 5th place game ===
February 28, 2015; 19:30	British Columbia	2–3 (1–0, 1–2, 0–1)	Nova Scotia	Kin 2, Prince George

Game reference
Jordan Hollett; Dorrin Sekikawa-Luding	Goalies	Matthew Welsh
8 min	Penalties	6 min
29	Shots	30

=== Semifinals ===
February 27, 2015; 16:00	Alberta	3–1 (1–1, 1–0, 1–0)	Manitoba	CN Centre, Prince George

Game reference
Ian Scott	Goalies	Dylan Myskiw
10 min	Penalties	10 min
26	Shots	33

February 27, 2015; 19:30	Ontario	5–2 (0–2, 2–0, 3–0)	Quebec	CN Centre, Prince George

Game reference
Michael DiPietro	Goalies	Alex D'Orio
10 min	Penalties	6 min
33	Shots	31

=== Bronze medal game ===
February 28, 2015; 19:30	Manitoba	5–3 (1–1, 1–1, 3–1)	Quebec	CN Centre, Prince George

Game reference

Matthew Radomsky
Goalies
Dereck Baribeau

Christensen (Martin, Woo) – 12:28	1–0
	1–1	16:01 – Teasdale (Voyer, Morand) (PP)
	1–2	26:20 – Poulin (Cardinal, Capannelli)
Ostir (Dewar) – 32:01	2–2
Ostir (Woo, Dewar) – 44:40	3–2
	3–3	44:50 – Poulin
Mattson (McIsaac) – 49:06	4–3
Ostir (Martin) (EN) – 59:13	5–3

6 min
Penalties
4 min
38
Shots
18

=== Gold medal game ===
March 1, 2015; 11:30	Alberta	1–3 (0–0, 0–1, 1–2)	Ontario	CN Centre, Prince George

Game reference

Ian Scott
Goalies
Michael DiPietro

	0–1	27:44 – McLeod (Tippett, Vilardi)
	0–2	51:33 – Suzuki (Ratcliffe)
	0–3	58:32 – Gallant (Meireles) (EN)
Franklin (PP) – 59:58	1–3

12 min
Penalties
8 min
30
Shots
36

== Final ranking and statistics ==
=== Final ranking ===
Rank	Team
1st place, gold medalist(s)	Ontario
2nd place, silver medalist(s)	Alberta
3rd place, bronze medalist(s)	Manitoba
4	Quebec
5	Nova Scotia
6	British Columbia
7	Saskatchewan
8	New Brunswick
9	Prince Edward Island
10	Newfoundland and Labrador
11	Yukon
12	Northwest Territories

=== Scoring leaders ===
List shows the top skaters sorted by points, then goals.

Player	GP	G	A	Pts	PIM
(Prince Edward Island) Jeremy McKenna	6	8	15	23	2
(Prince Edward Island) Carson MacKinnon	6	12	4	16	4
(Prince Edward Island) Thomas Casey	6	2	12	14	0
(Newfoundland and Labrador) Adam Dawe	6	10	3	13	6
(Ontario) Gabriel Vilardi	6	5	7	12	0
(Ontario) Ryan McLeod	6	6	5	11	4
(Quebec) Antoine Morand	6	5	6	11	4
(Newfoundland and Labrador) Kyle McGrath	6	6	4	10	4
(Quebec) Joe Veleno	6	4	6	10	6
(Newfoundland and Labrador) Joel Bishop	6	4	6	10	16

Source: HockeyCanada.ca

=== Leading goaltenders ===
Only the top five goaltenders, based on Goals Against Average, who played at least 120 minutes, are included in this list.

Player	TOI	GA	GAA	SA	SV%	SO
Noah Laybolt	119:59	1	0.50	22	.955	1
(Ontario) Michael DiPietro	240:00	3	0.75	102	.971	2
Matthew Normore	129:23	3	1.39	31	.903	1
(Yukon) Tynan Hope	120:00	3	1.50	47	.936	0
(Alberta) Ian Scott	300:00	9	1.80	146	.938	0

Source: HockeyCanada.ca
