= Ice hockey at the 2007 Canada Winter Games =

2011 Canada Winter Games

Tournament details
- Venues: 2 (in 1 host city)
- Dates: February 24–March 2
- Teams: 12

Ice hockey at the 2007 Canada Winter Games was held at the Takhini Arena and the Canada Games Centre in Whitehorse

== Men's ==
Medals
Gold	Silver	Bronze
Ontario: Edward Pasquale, Nathan Moon, Stefan Della Rovere, James Livingston, Adam Henrique, Cody Lindsay, Corey Trivino, Kelly Geoffrey, Steven Stamkos, Cody Hodgson, Mark Cundari, Anthony Nigro, Brandon Burlon, Christopher Carozzi, Michael Del Zotto, Mitchell Gaulton, Tyler Cuma, Michael D'Orazio, Alex Pietrangelo, Nazem Kadri.	Manitoba: Mark Friesen, David Toews, Stephan Vigier, Sanfred King, Braeden Adamyk, Colan Jackson, Cory More, Colin Phaneuf, Jordan Mistelbacher, Shayne Wiebe, Eric Mesterey, Michael Stone, Travis Bobbee, Kyle Birch, Colby Robak, Travis Hamonic, Scott Macaulay, Tyler Schmidt, Paul VanDeVelde, Dale Hunt.	Alberta: Andrew MacWilliam, Tyler Myers, Matthew Fraser, Jordan Rowley, Steven Seigo, Thomas Carr, Matthew Strong, Jordan Eberle, Craig Orfino, Devon Kalinski, Joe Colborne, Lance Bouma, Steele Boomer, Cassidy Mappin, Cole Penner, Kevin King, Philip Gervais, Wacey Hamilton, Jacob DeSerres, Dalyn Flette.

Group A
Province	Pld	W	L	D
Saskatchewan	2	1	0	1
Alberta	2	1	0	1
Northwest Territories	2	0	2	0

Group B
Province	Pld	W	L	D
Quebec	2	2	0	0
Nova Scotia	2	1	1	0
Yukon	2	0	2	0

Group C
Province	Pld	W	L	D
Ontario	2	2	0	0
Manitoba	2	1	1	0
Prince Edward Island	2	0	2	0

Group D
Province	Pld	W	L	D
British Columbia	2	2	0	0
New Brunswick	2	1	1	0
Newfoundland and Labrador	2	0	2	0

Quarter-finals
Alberta	4
New Brunswick	3
Quebec	6
Manitoba	7
Ontario	6
Nova Scotia	0
British Columbia	5
Saskatchewan	4

Semi-finals
Alberta	1
Manitoba	5
Ontario	4
British Columbia	3

Final
Manitoba	4
Ontario	6
Bronze medal match
Alberta	4
British Columbia	3

== Women's ==
Medals
Gold	Silver	Bronze
Ontario	Manitoba	Quebec

Group A
Province	Pld	W	L	D
Ontario	2	2	0	0
Newfoundland and Labrador	2	1	1	0
Prince Edward Island	2	0	2	0

Group B
Province	Pld	W	L	D
Quebec	2	2	0	0
New Brunswick	2	1	1	0
Alberta	2	0	2	0

Group C
Province	Pld	W	L	D
Saskatchewan	2	2	0	0
British Columbia	2	1	1	0
Yukon	2	0	2	0

Group D
Province	Pld	W	L	D
Manitoba	2	2	0	0
Nova Scotia	2	1	1	0
Northwest Territories	2	0	2	0

Quarter-finals
Newfoundland and Labrador	0
Quebec	12
British Columbia	0
Ontario	3
Manitoba	6
Nova Scotia	1
New Brunswick	0
Saskatchewan	3

Semi-finals
Ontario	3
Quebec	1
Manitoba	1
Saskatchewan	0

Final
Ontario	6
Manitoba	3
Bronze medal match
Quebec	6
Saskatchewan	0
