= Kyle Burroughs =

Canadian ice hockey player (born 1995)

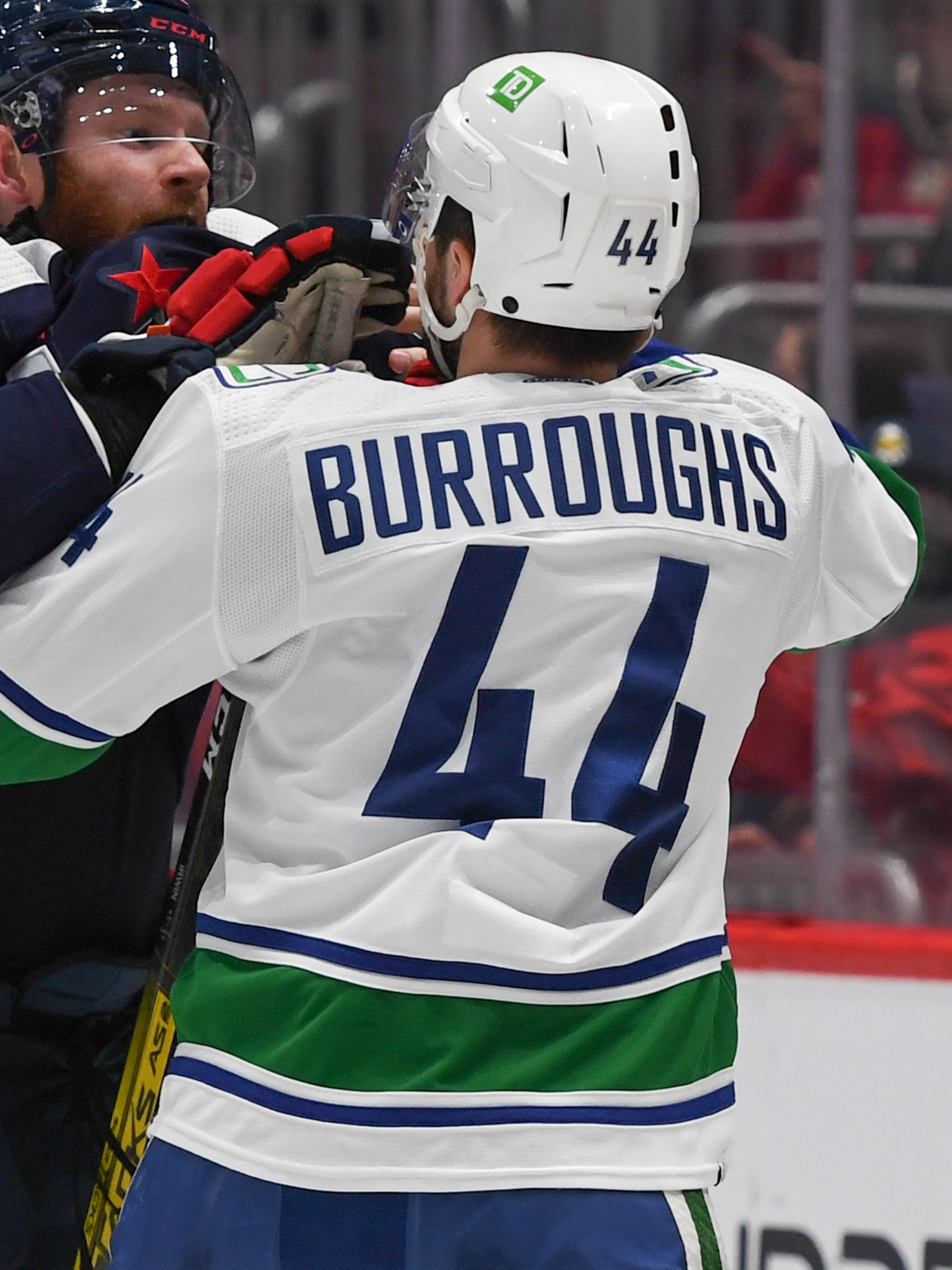
- Burroughs with the Vancouver Canucks in 2022
- Born: June 12, 1995 (age 31) Vancouver, British Columbia, Canada
- Height: 6 ft 0 in (183 cm)
- Weight: 193 lb (88 kg; 13 st 11 lb)
- Position: Defence
- Shoots: Right
- NHL team (P) Cur. team Former teams: Dallas Stars; Texas Stars (AHL); Colorado Avalanche; Vancouver Canucks; San Jose Sharks; Los Angeles Kings
- NHL draft: 196th overall, 2013; New York Islanders
- Playing career: 2014–present

Kyle Burroughs (born July 12, 1995) is a Canadian professional ice hockey defenceman for the Texas Stars in the American Hockey League (AHL) while under contract to the Dallas Stars of the National Hockey League (NHL). Burroughs was drafted 196th overall by the New York Islanders in the 2013 NHL entry draft.

Prior to turning professional, Burroughs played for the Regina Pats and the Medicine Hat Tigers in the Western Hockey League.

== Playing career ==
=== Early career ===
Burroughs began his minor hockey career playing AAA bantam with the Langley Eagles. As an associate captain, Burroughs recorded 40 points in 33 games during the 2009–10 season. He then established himself with the Valley West Hawks in the BC Hockey Major Midget League where he was also named an associate captain. During the 2010–11 season, Burroughs earned a call up to the Aldergrove Kodiaks in the Pacific Junior Hockey League and Regina Pats in the Western Hockey League. He had been drafted by the Pats 47th overall in the 2010 WHL Draft. While with the Valley West Hawks, Burroughs was named a BCMML All-Star. The following season, Burroughs joined the Pats for his first full season in major junior hockey. He made his WHL season debut on September 28, 2011, against the Medicine Hat Tigers, helping the Pats win their third straight game to start off the 2011–12 season.

Leading up to the 2013 NHL entry draft, Burroughs was ranked 206th among North American skaters. However, due to a breakout season, by April Burroughs had moved up to 133rd. On March 15, 2013, Burroughs was awarded the Charles Johnston Memorial Award as the Pats top defenceman after he led the team's defenceman in points. He was later drafted in the seventh round of the 2013 NHL Draft by the New York Islanders.

On September 23, 2013, Burroughs was named captain of the Pats as a replacement for Colton Jobke who had begun his professional career. During the 2013–14 season, Burroughs suffered a concussion as the result of a hit by Brandon Wheat Kings centre Jayce Hawryluk, who was suspended two games. Burroughs was forced to sit out seven games to recover. Despite this, he recorded a new career high in goals and assists and was again awarded the Charles Johnston Memorial Award. After the Pats season had ended, Burroughs played nine games with the Islanders American Hockey League affiliate, the Bridgeport Sound Tigers, to help conclude their season.

Burroughs attended the Islanders Development Camp prior to the 2014–15 season but was subsequently returned to the Pats. On January 5, 2015, Burroughs and Dryden Hunt were traded to the Medicine Hat Tigers in exchange for Connor Hobbs and future draft picks. At the time, Burroughs had recorded 22 points in 36 games for the Pats that season. While playing with the Medicine Hat Tigers in the 2015 WHL playoffs, Burroughs signed a three-year, entry-level contract with the Islanders on April 8, 2015. Burroughs contributed three points in ten games during the playoffs as the Medicine Hat Tigers lost to the Calgary Hitmen in the Conference Semi-finals.

=== Professional ===
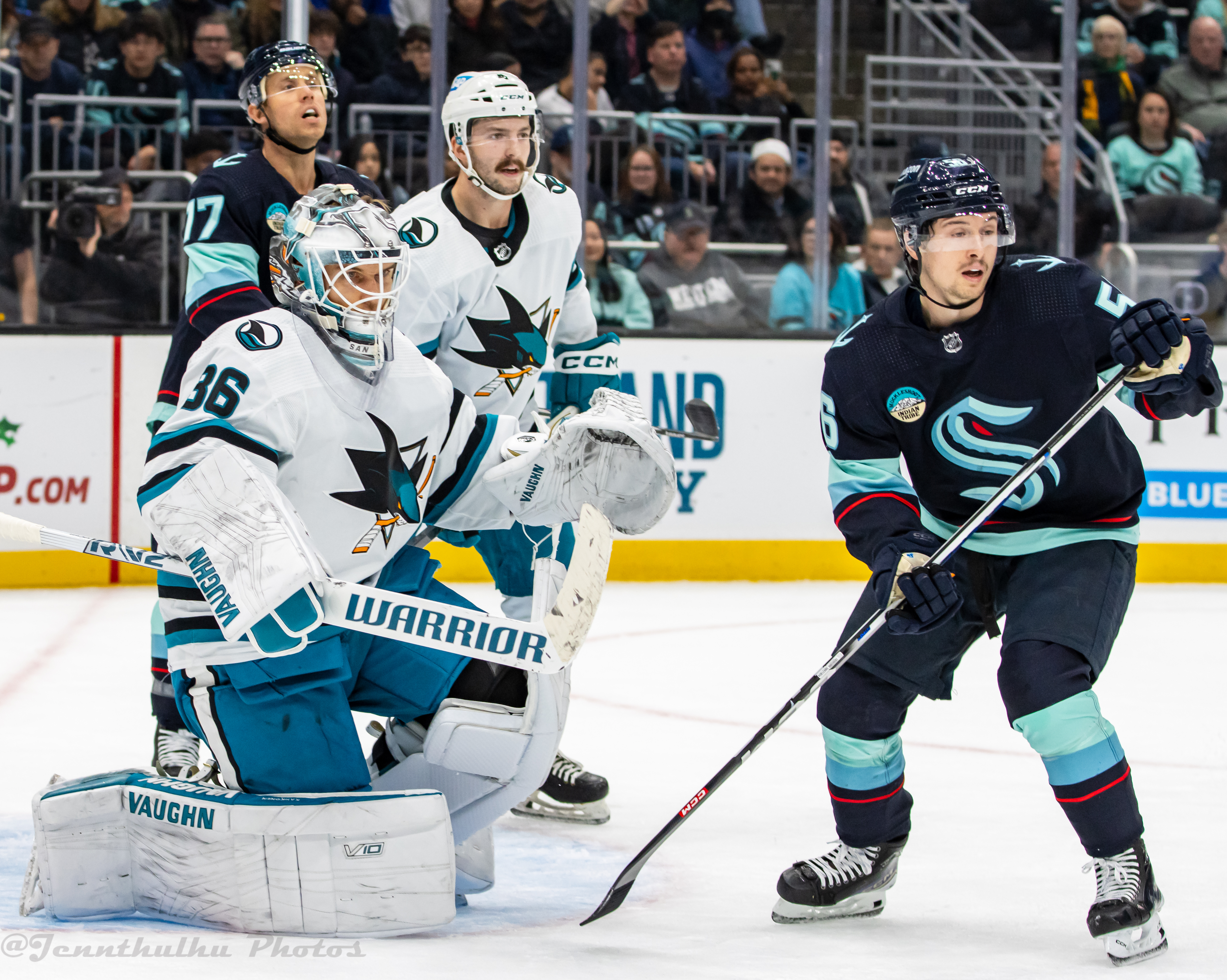
Burroughs (middle background, in white) with the San Jose Sharks in 2023.

The following season, Burroughs was assigned to the Islanders ECHL affiliate, the Missouri Mavericks, to begin the 2015–16 season and his first full season in the professional ranks. He played in 18 games for the Mavericks, recording seven points, before being recalled to the AHL. He recorded his first AHL point on January 1, 2016, with an assist on Jared Gomes' goal during a game against the Springfield Thunderbirds. On March 6, 2016, Burroughs collided with a player from the Hartford Wolf Pack, causing him to miss a month of playing time. During his rookie season, Burroughs played on the Sound Tigers second powerplay unit and on the penalty kill, leaving him to end the season with 10 points in 31 regular season games. He helped the Sound Tigers qualify for the 2016 Calder Cup playoffs, where they lost in the first round to the Toronto Marlies.

After attending the Islanders training camp, Burroughs was reassigned to the Sound Tigers for the 2016–17 season. He ended the season with a new career high in goals, assists, and penalty minutes. On March 30, 2017, Burroughs was named the Sound Tigers AHL Man of the Year due to his work in the community and with charities.

Burroughs recorded a spike in offense during the 2017–18 season. He ended the season with a team-leading plus-16 and a new career high in goals and points. On March 29, 2018, Burroughs was named the Sound Tigers AHL Man of the Year for the second time due to his work in the community. On July 16, 2018, Burroughs signed a two-year, two way contract extension with the Islanders.

After clearing waivers, Burroughs began the 2018–19 season with the Sound Tigers. Prior to the 2018–19 season, Burroughs was named a co-captain for the Sound Tigers alongside Ben Holmstrom. Burroughs would serve as captain whenever Holmstrom was out of the lineup. On November 12, 2018, Burroughs was suspended for one game due to a high-sticking incident in a game against the Providence Bruins. A few days later on November 17, Burroughs played in his 200th AHL game.

On October 11, 2020, Burroughs was traded by the Islanders to the Colorado Avalanche in exchange for A. J. Greer. After attending the Avalanche training camp leading into the delayed 2020–21 season, Burroughs was placed on waivers and upon clearing was assigned to their AHL affiliate, the Colorado Eagles, on January 10, 2021. Burroughs played in his first NHL hockey game on April 5, 2021, in a 5–4 win against the Minnesota Wild at the Xcel Energy Center. Two days later, he recorded his first NHL point, an assist to a goal by André Burakovsky. Burroughs split the remainder of the season between the Avalanche and Eagles, finishing with 1 assist through 5 regular season games.

As a free agent after his successful stint with the Colorado Avalanche, Burroughs was signed to a two-year, two-way contract with the Vancouver Canucks on July 28, 2021. Burroughs scored his first NHL goal on November 19, 2021, in Vancouver's 3–2 win over the Winnipeg Jets.

On July 1, 2023, Burroughs was signed as a free agent to a three-year, $3.3 million contract with the San Jose Sharks. One year into his contract, however, he was traded to the Los Angeles Kings on June 27, 2024, in exchange for Carl Grundström.

As a free agent from the Kings, Burroughs was signed to a one-year, two-way contract with the Dallas Stars for the 2026–27 season on July 6, 2026.

== International play ==
Burroughs played for Team BC at the 2011 Canada Winter Games where he won a gold medal.

On November 21, 2011, Burroughs was selected to play for Team Pacific at the 2012 World U-17 Hockey Challenge.

== Career statistics ==
=== Regular season and playoffs ===
			Regular season					Playoffs
Season	Team	League	GP	G	A	Pts	PIM	GP	G	A	Pts	PIM
2010–11	Valley West Hawks	BCMML	36	11	25	36	58	4	0	4	4	2
2010–11	Aldergrove Kodiaks	PIJHL	4	0	1	1	18	—	—	—	—	—
2010–11	Regina Pats	WHL	1	0	0	0	0	—	—	—	—	—
2011–12	Regina Pats	WHL	55	2	6	8	54	5	1	1	2	0
2012–13	Regina Pats	WHL	70	5	28	33	91	—	—	—	—	—
2013–14	Regina Pats	WHL	58	8	32	40	72	4	0	1	1	8
2013–14	Bridgeport Sound Tigers	AHL	9	0	0	0	2	—	—	—	—	—
2014–15	Regina Pats	WHL	36	5	17	22	47	—	—	—	—	—
2014–15	Medicine Hat Tigers	WHL	30	2	15	17	38	10	0	3	3	6
2015–16	Missouri Mavericks	ECHL	18	1	6	7	17	—	—	—	—	—
2015–16	Bridgeport Sound Tigers	AHL	31	2	8	10	30	2	1	1	2	4
2016–17	Bridgeport Sound Tigers	AHL	71	3	21	24	116	—	—	—	—	—
2017–18	Bridgeport Sound Tigers	AHL	75	6	19	25	99	—	—	—	—	—
2018–19	Bridgeport Sound Tigers	AHL	69	4	11	15	103	5	0	3	3	0
2019–20	Bridgeport Sound Tigers	AHL	58	2	6	8	69	—	—	—	—	—
2020–21	Colorado Eagles	AHL	11	1	3	4	12	2	0	0	0	9
2020–21	Colorado Avalanche	NHL	5	0	1	1	5	—	—	—	—	—
2021–22	Vancouver Canucks	NHL	42	1	4	5	39	—	—	—	—	—
2022–23	Vancouver Canucks	NHL	48	2	3	5	62	—	—	—	—	—
2023–24	San Jose Sharks	NHL	73	2	6	8	71	—	—	—	—	—
2024–25	Los Angeles Kings	NHL	33	0	3	3	39	—	—	—	—	—
2025–26	Ontario Reign	AHL	18	1	6	7	10	—	—	—	—	—
NHL totals			201	5	17	22	216	—	—	—	—	—

=== International ===
Year	Team	Event	Result	GP	G	A	Pts	PIM
2012	Canada Pacific	U17	5th	5	1	2	3	14
Junior totals				5	1	2	3	14

== Awards and honors ==
Award	Year
BCMHL
BCMML All-Star	2010–11
WHL
Charles Johnston Memorial Award	2013, 2014
AHL
Bridgeport Sound Tigers AHL Man of the Year	2017, 2018
