= 2015 Canada Winter Games =

2015 multi-sport event in Prince George, British Columbia

- 13th Canada Winter Games; XXV Canada Games
- Host city: Prince George, British Columbia
- Country: Canada
- Opening: February 13
- Closing: March 1

Summer

Winter

The 2015 Canada Winter Games, officially known as the XXV Canada Games, is a Canadian multi-sport event that was held from February 12 to March 1, 2015, in Prince George, British Columbia.

== Sports ==
- Alpine skiing
- Archery
- Badminton
- Biathlon
- Cross-country skiing
- Curling
- Figure skating
- Freestyle skiing
- Gymnastics
  - Artistic gymnastics (14)
  - Trampoline (2)
- Ice hockey
  - Men's tournament
- Judo
- Ringette
- Shooting
- Short track speed skating
- Speed skating
- Snowboarding
- Squash
- Synchronized swimming
- Table tennis
- Wheelchair Basketball

== Medal table ==
The following is the medal table for the 2015 Canada Winter Games.

Key

* Host nation ( British Columbia)

Rank	Team	Gold	Silver	Bronze	Total
1	Quebec	62	39	40	141
2	Ontario	46	40	24	110
3	British Columbia*	22	33	33	88
4	Alberta	14	24	37	75
5	Saskatchewan	6	8	14	28
6	Manitoba	6	3	6	15
7	New Brunswick	3	4	6	13
8	Yukon	3	1	4	8
9	Newfoundland and Labrador	2	2	0	4
10	Nova Scotia	0	2	2	4
11	Northwest Territories	0	1	0	1
12	Prince Edward Island	0	0	1	1
Totals (12 entries)		164	157	167	488

== Calendar ==
The schedule of events was as follows:

●	Opening ceremony	Event competitions	●	Event finals	●	Closing ceremony

February/March 2015	12th Thu	13th Fri	14th Sat	15th Sun	16th Mon	17th Tue	18th Wed	19th Thu	20th Fri	21st Sat	22nd Sun	23rd Mon	24th Tue	25th Wed	26th Thu	27th Fri	28th Sat	1st Sun	Gold Medals
Ceremonies		●																●	
Alpine skiing				2	2	2	2	2	2										12
Archery				●	●	4	2												6
Badminton												●	●	5	●	●	2		7
Biathlon				2		2	2		2										8
Cross-country skiing												6	4		6		2		18
Curling			●	●	●	●	●	1				●	●	●	●	●	1		2
Figure skating												●	●	6	6				12
Freestyle skiing			2	2		2	2												8
Gymnastics				1	1	1	1	10					2	1					17
Hockey			●	●	●	●	●	●	1		●	●	●	●	●	●	●	1	2
Judo														7	7		2		16
Ringette			●	●	●	●	●	●	1										1
Shooting					2	2	2	2											8
Short track speed skating				2	●		2	4	2										10
Snowboarding													2			2	2		6
Squash												●	●	●		●	2	2	4
Speed skating			2	4		4	2												14
Synchronized swimming													●	●		2	1		3
Table tennis												●	●	2	●	●	5		7
Wheelchair basketball					●	●	●	●	1										
Total Gold Medals																			
Cumulative Total																			
February/March 2015	12th Thu	13th Fri	14th Sat	15th Sun	16th Mon	17th Tue	18th Wed	19th Thu	20th Fri	21st Sat	22nd Sun	23rd Mon	24th Tue	25th Wed	26th Thu	27th Fri	28th Sat	1st Sun	Gold Medals
