= Zatzman Sportsplex =

Sports venue in Nova Scotia

Coordinates: 44°40′11.60″N 63°34′31.10″W

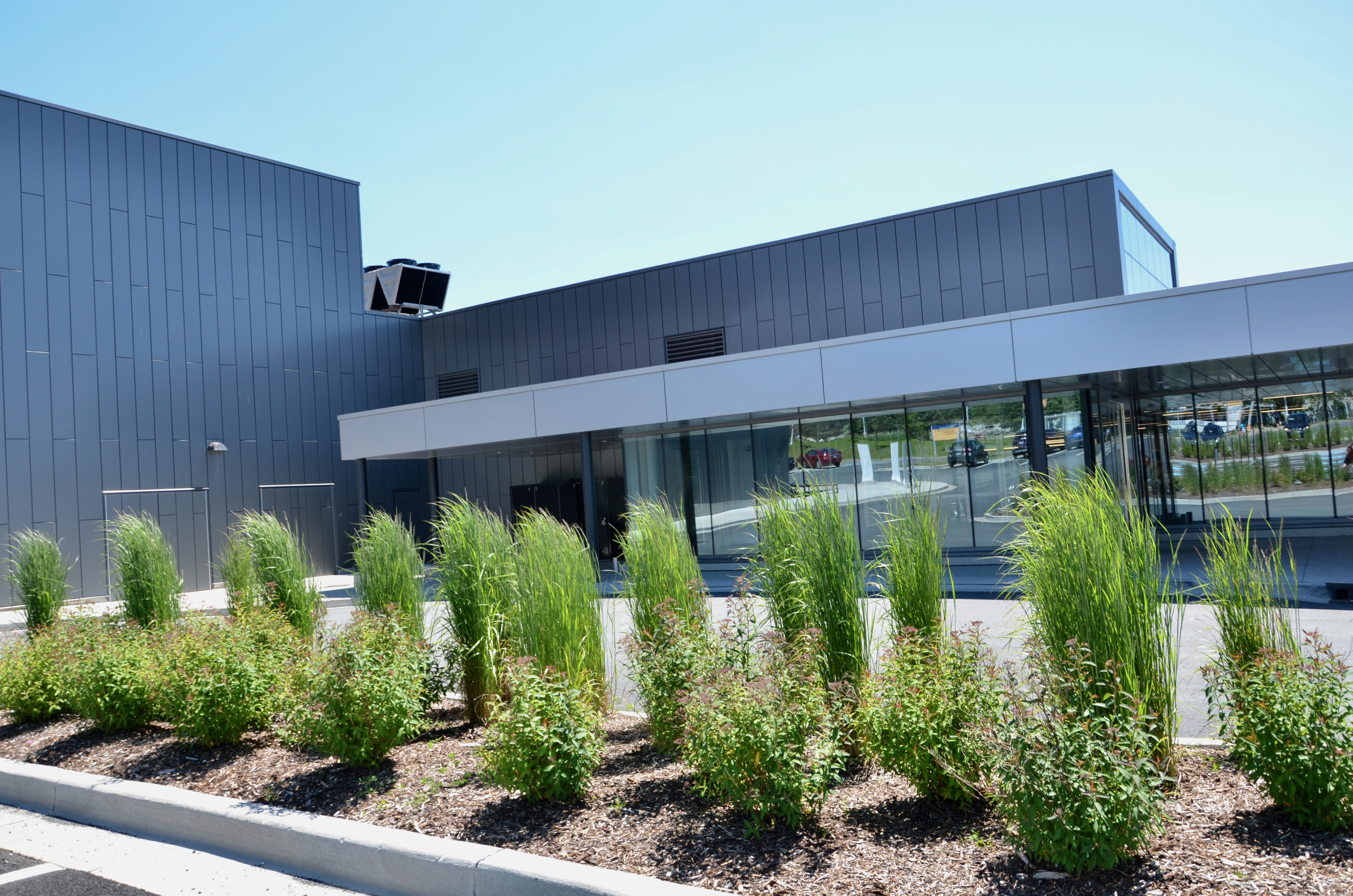
- Main entrance

- Location within Nova Scotia
- Former names: Dartmouth Sportsplex

General information
- Status: Completed
- Type: Sports centre
- Location: 110 Wyse Road; Dartmouth, Nova Scotia
- Groundbreaking: 1981
- Opened: 1982
- Renovated: 2019
- Owner: Halifax Regional Municipality

Other information
- Seating capacity: 3,000 (ice hockey); 3,500 (stage events)

Website
- zatzmansportsplex.com

The Zatzman Sportsplex is an indoor sports and community centre in Dartmouth, Nova Scotia, opened 1982 and known as the Dartmouth Sportsplex until 2019. It houses an arena, a gymnasium, two swimming pools, and other fitness, leisure and events facilities. It is managed by the Dartmouth Sportsplex Community Association, a non-profit organization which runs the facility on behalf of the Halifax Regional Council.

== History ==
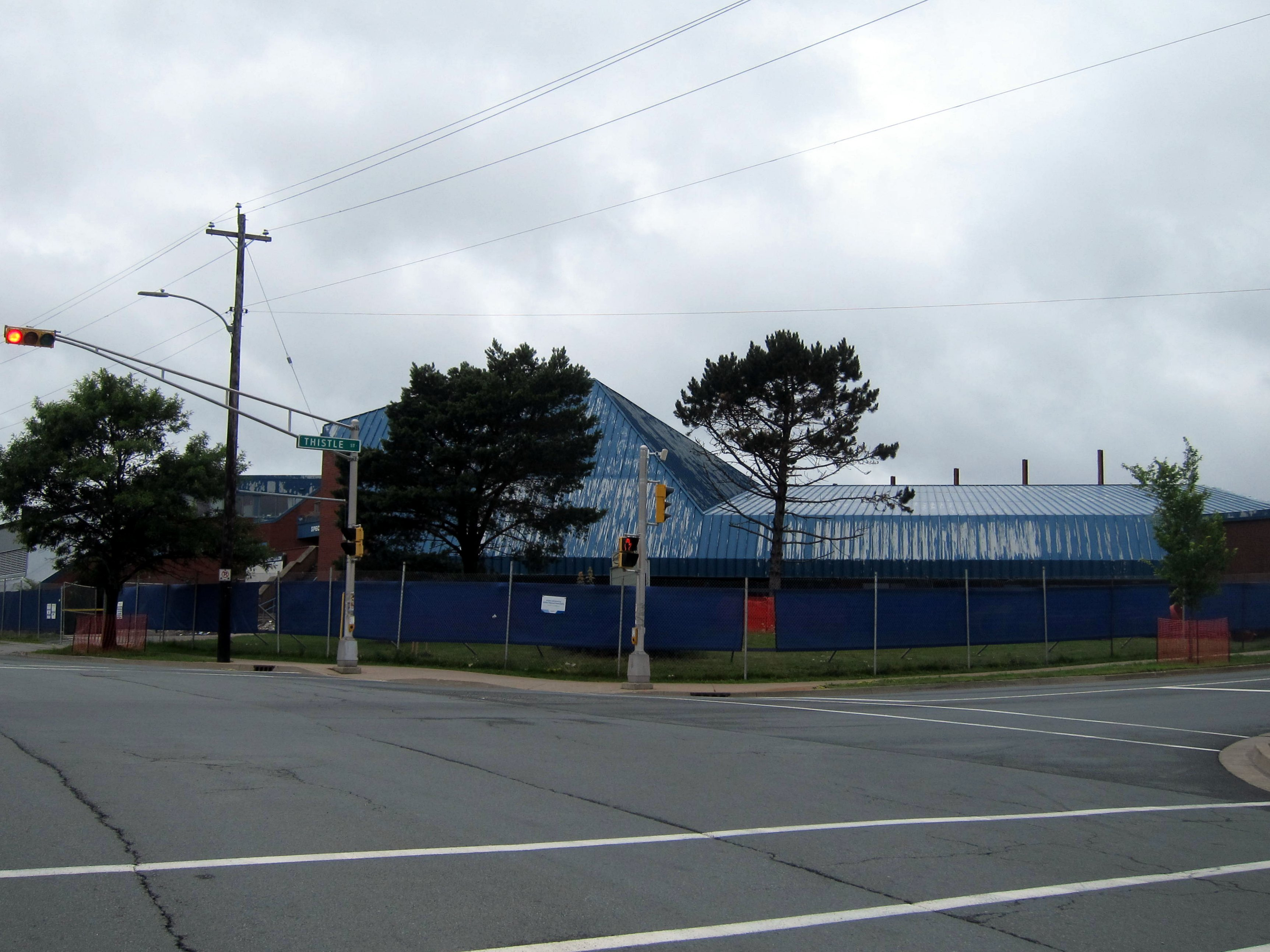
The Dartmouth Sportsplex, pictured while under renovation in July 2017

The site was formerly home to the Dartmouth Memorial Rink, which was built in 1950 and burned down on 16 May 1974. A sod-turning ceremony was held for the new Sportsplex in March 1981 by Dartmouth mayor Daniel Brownlow and Premier John Buchanan. It was constructed by Dineen Construction and cost $7 million. The Sportsplex opened in 1982. A management agreement between the municipality and the Dartmouth Sportsplex Community Association was signed in 1998, and has been renewed every year since.

The Dartmouth Sportsplex closed in early 2017 for a major renovation and expansion. A new double gymnasium and multi-purpose meeting rooms were added, while the fitness room was expanded. Most of the interior was revamped, except for the hockey arena. The project was designed by Diamond Schmitt Architects and local firm Abbott Brown. Estimated in 2016 to cost $20 million, it ended up costing about $28 million. The complex reopened in February 2019 as the Zatzman Sportsplex following a $750,000 donation from the Zatzman family in honour of the late Joseph Zatzman, businessman and former mayor of Dartmouth.

== Facilities ==
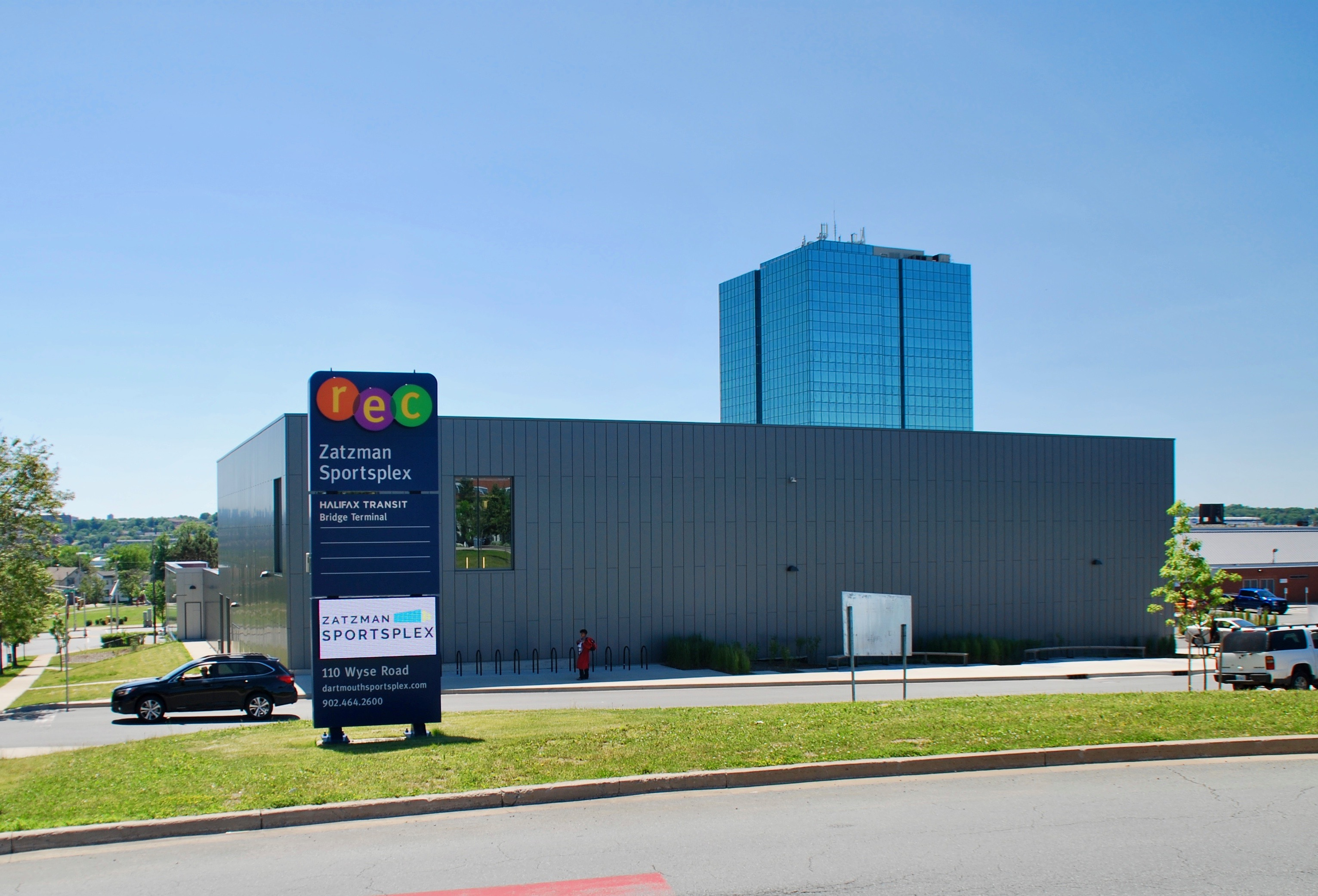
Zatzman Sportsplex sign and new gym.

The arena has a capacity of 3,000 for hockey and 3,500 for stage events. It has been home to various junior, senior and minor and high school hockey teams. It also hosts occasional trade shows and concerts. The complex also houses a 25-metre, eight lane swimming pool, home to the Dartmouth Whalers and Dartmouth Crusaders swim clubs, as well as a smaller teaching pool.

Other facilities include meeting and community rooms, a gymnasium, fitness and cardio rooms, racquetball and squash courts, a running track, water slides, and a canteen (not yet opened following renovations).

== Clubs and events hosted ==
- Halifax Hoopers professional basketball team
- Canada Winter Games - men's and women's ice hockey, February 11-27, 2011
- Dartmouth High School (Nova Scotia) Graduations-1984-present
- Metro Marauders Junior A hockey team, 2010–2013 (now Valley Wildcats)
- Nova Scotia Liberal Party leadership convention, April 2007
- Dartmouth Destroyers, Canadian Elite Hockey League, 2005-2006
- IIHF World Women's Championships, 2004 (co-hosted with Halifax Metro Centre)
- Emergency shelter, Operation Yellow Ribbon, 2001
- Dartmouth Oland Exports, Maritime Junior Hockey League, 1995–1998
- Fred Page Cup, 1996,
- Air Canada Cup, 1992
- Dartmouth Moosehead Mounties Maritime Senior Hockey League 1985-1994

== Transportation ==
The facility is adjacent to the Halifax Transit Bridge Terminal, the busiest public transport hub in the city serving 24 different transit routes.
