= Scott Barney =

Canadian ice hockey player (born 1979)

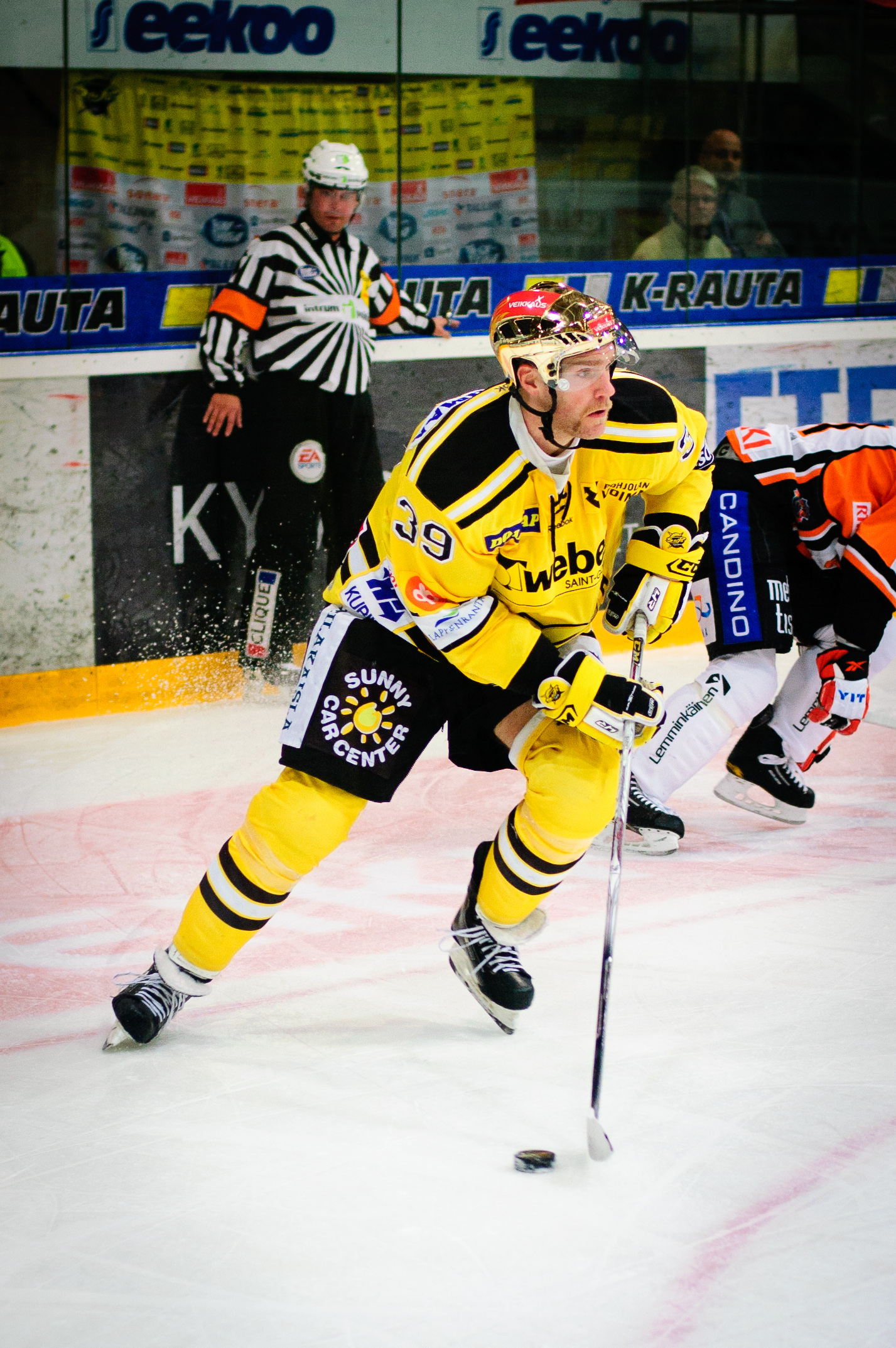
- Born: March 27, 1979 (age 47) Oshawa, Ontario, Canada
- Height: 6 ft 4 in (193 cm)
- Weight: 210 lb (95 kg; 15 st 0 lb)
- Position: Right wing
- Shot: Right
- Played for: Los Angeles Kings; Atlanta Thrashers; Augsburger Panther; SaiPa; BK Mlada Boleslav; HPK; HC Thurgau; Dornbirner EC; High1; HC Valpellice; EHC Lustenau; China Dragon; Anyang Halla
- NHL draft: 29th overall, 1997; Los Angeles Kings
- Playing career: 1999–2018

Scott Barney (born March 27, 1979) is a Canadian former professional ice hockey forward, who played 27 games in the National Hockey League with the Los Angeles Kings and Atlanta Thrashers between 2003 and 2005. The rest of his career, which lasted from 1999 to 2018, was mainly spent in Europe and Asia. Barney currently serves as the head coach for the Sudbury Wolves of the Ontario Hockey League, having been hired on June 27, 2024.

== Playing career ==
Barney was drafted by the Los Angeles Kings 29th overall in the 1997 NHL entry draft. He did not get to play in the National Hockey League until the 2002–03 season, because he missed three consecutive seasons due to a severe back injury. He also played for the Atlanta Thrashers. Barney played a total of 27 games in the NHL, scoring 5 goals and adding 6 assists for 11 points. He was loaned to the Hershey Bears in March 2007 from the Grand Rapids Griffins and was re-signed by the Bears for the 2007–08 season on July 31, 2007. For 2008–09 he moved to Germany to play for Augsburger Panther. In 2009–10 he started the season in SC Bietigheim-Bissingen, but was signed by Finnish team SaiPa in October. He continued with the team for 2010–11 season.

On November 21, 2010, he joined BK Mladá Boleslav of the Czech Extraliga. After just 13 games with Boleslav however, Barney returned to Finland on January 18, 2011, to complete the 2010–11 season with HPK.

Barney returned to HPK for the 2011–12 season. He was briefly loaned to EC Red Bull Salzburg for the non-regulation European Trophy, but returned to play for HPK. He then left HPK part-way through the season to help out the second-tier teams HC Thurgau and Dornbirner EC of the Swiss National League B and Austrian National League, respectively.

Barney played the 2012–13 season in the Asian Ice Hockey League with South Korean team High1. On August 8, 2013, Barney signed with HC Valpellice of the Italian Elite.A. For the 2014–15 season, he signed with Austrian team EHC Lustenau of the Inter-National League, where he played for two seasons before ending his playing career.

== Coaching ==
Barney joined the Humboldt Broncos of the Saskatchewan Junior Hockey League as an assistant coach for the 2018–19 season, and became their head coach and general manager a few months later. He remained in those positions until the 2023–24 season. Barney was named head coach for the Sudbury Wolves of the Ontario Hockey League on June 27, 2024.

== Career statistics ==
=== Regular season and playoffs ===
			Regular season					Playoffs
Season	Team	League	GP	G	A	Pts	PIM	GP	G	A	Pts	PIM
1994–95	North York Rangers	MetJHL	41	16	19	35	88	—	—	—	—	—
1995–96	Peterborough Petes	OHL	60	22	24	46	52	24	6	8	14	38
1996–97	Peterborough Petes	OHL	64	21	33	54	110	9	0	3	3	16
1997–98	Peterborough Petes	OHL	62	44	32	76	60	4	1	0	1	6
1998–99	Springfield Falcons	AHL	5	0	0	0	2	1	0	0	0	2
1998–99	Peterborough Petes	OHL	44	41	26	67	80	5	4	1	5	4
2002–03	Manchester Monarchs	AHL	57	13	5	18	74	—	—	—	—	—
2002–03	Los Angeles Kings	NHL	5	0	0	0	0	—	—	—	—	—
2003–04	Los Angeles Kings	NHL	19	5	6	11	4	—	—	—	—	—
2003–04	Manchester Monarchs	AHL	44	20	14	34	28	6	2	3	5	8
2005–06	Chicago Wolves	AHL	53	32	19	51	54	—	—	—	—	—
2005–06	Atlanta Thrashers	NHL	3	0	0	0	0	—	—	—	—	—
2006–07	Grand Rapids Griffins	AHL	40	4	8	12	26	—	—	—	—	—
2006–07	Hershey Bears	AHL	11	6	4	10	6	19	10	9	19	14
2007–08	Hershey Bears	AHL	66	21	20	41	60	—	—	—	—	—
2008–09	Augsburger Panther	DEL	51	12	32	82	4	0	0	0	2
2009–10	SC Bietigheim Steelers	GER-2	4	0	3	3	0	—	—	—	—	—
2009–10	SaiPa	FIN	43	16	14	30	60	—	—	—	—	—
2010–11	SaiPa	FIN	21	9	9	18	18	—	—	—	—	—
2010–11	BK Mlada Boleslav	CZE	13	2	2	4	8	—	—	—	—	—
2010–11	HPK	FIN	18	5	1	6	20	2	0	0	0	2
2011–12	HPK	FIN	20	2	3	5	8	—	—	—	—	—
2011–12	HC Thurgau	NLB	5	0	2	2	2	—	—	—	—	—
2011–12	Dornbirner EC	AUT-2	20	2	3	5	8	—	—	—	—	—
2012–13	High1	AL	42	37	50	87	34	—	—	—	—	—
2013–14	HC Valpellice	ITA	42	29	38	67	84	5	2	4	6	2
2014–15	EHC Lustenau	AUT-2	28	22	25	47	48	11	6	6	12	6
2015–16	EHC Lustenau	AUT-2	32	32	29	61	59	11	4	9	13	10
2016–17	China Dragon	AL	48	14	42	56	62	—	—	—	—	—
2017–18	Anyang Halla	AL	21	9	8	17	12	8	0	3	3	0
NHL totals			27	5	6	11	4	—	—	—	—	—

=== International ===
Year	Team	Event	GP	G	A	Pts	PIM
1996	Canada	IH18	5	0	1	1	18
Junior totals			5	0	1	1	18
