= David Toews =

Canadian ice hockey player

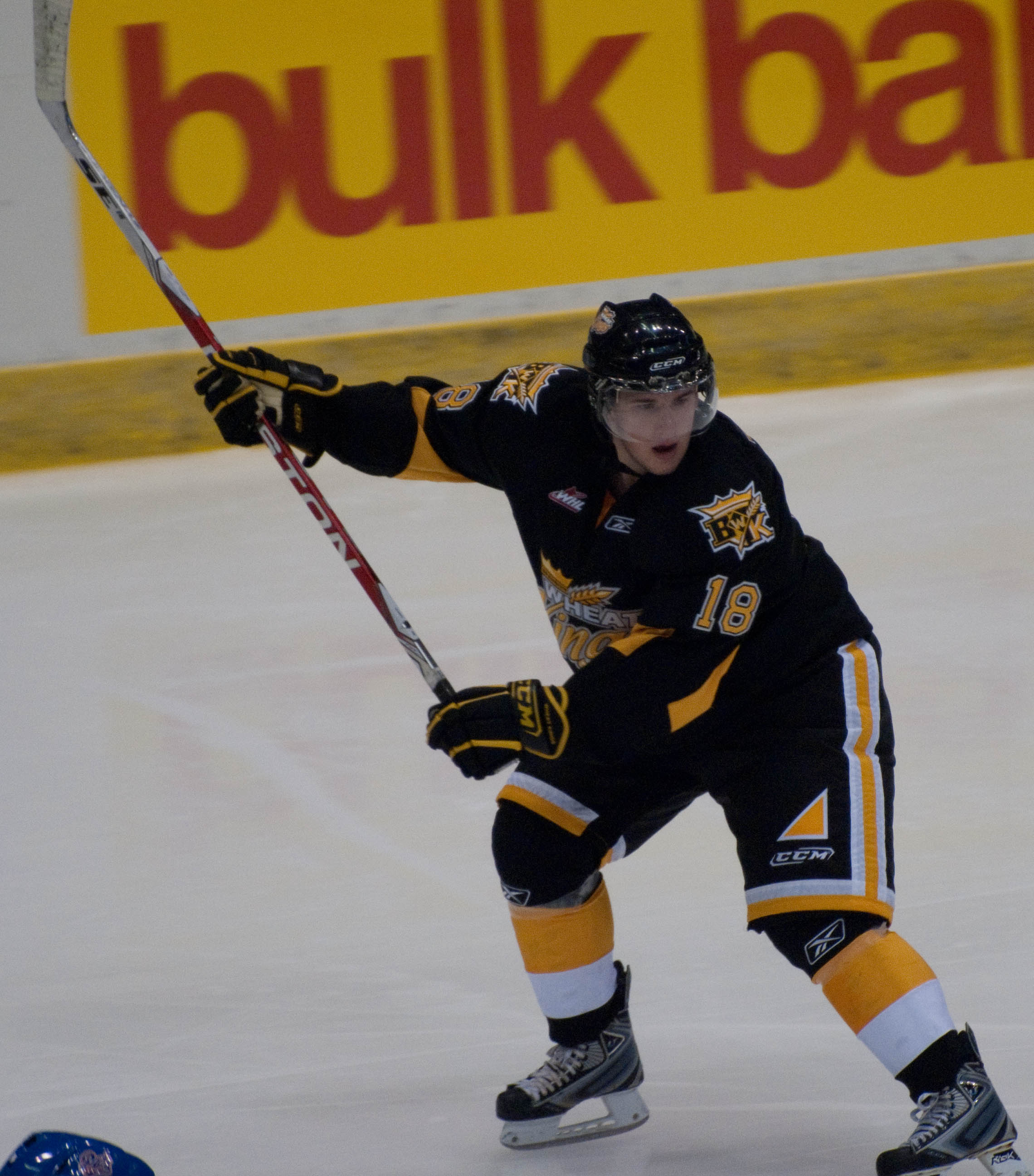
- Toews with the Brandon Wheat Kings in 2010
- Born: June 7, 1990 (age 36) Winnipeg, Manitoba, Canada
- Height: 5 ft 11 in (180 cm)
- Weight: 200 lb (91 kg; 14 st 4 lb)
- Position: Center
- Shot: Right
- Played for: AHL; Rockford IceHogs; ECHL; Toledo Walleye; Bakersfield Condors; Idaho Steelheads; Utah Grizzlies
- NHL draft: 66th overall, 2008; New York Islanders
- Playing career: 2009–2013

David Toews (born June 7, 1990) is a Canadian former professional ice hockey player. He was drafted by the New York Islanders in the 3rd round, 66th overall, in the 2008 NHL entry draft. He is the younger brother of former Chicago Blackhawks captain Jonathan Toews.

== Playing career ==
=== Amateur ===
At the 2005 WHL Bantam Draft, Toews was selected in the sixth round, 117th overall by the Brandon Wheat Kings. Toews began his career at Shattuck-Saint Mary's with its Tier I Bantam team. During his first season with the prep team at Shattuck-Saint Mary's, Toews was named to the Manitoba roster for the ice hockey tournament at the 2007 Canada Games. There, he helped the team to their best finish in the tournament's history, losing 6–4 to Ontario in the gold-medal game.

In the off-season before his final year at Shattuck-Saint Mary's, Toews gave a verbal commitment to attend the University of North Dakota and play for the North Dakota Fighting Sioux men's ice hockey team beginning in the 2008–09 season.

Heading into the 2008 NHL entry draft, Toews was ranked 79th among North American skaters by the NHL Central Scouting Bureau. He had previously been ranked 71st among North American skaters in January 2008. On June 21, 2008, Toews was drafted in the third round, 66th overall by the New York Islanders.

=== Professional ===
On September 9, 2011, the Chicago Blackhawks acquired Toews from the New York Islanders for future considerations. On September 23, 2011, the Blackhawks assigned Toews to the Rockford IceHogs of the AHL. The IceHogs loaned Toews to the Toledo Walleye of the ECHL on October 13, 2011. Toews signed a one-year contract with the Bakersfield Condors for the 2012–13 season. In January Toews was placed on waivers and claimed by the Idaho Steelheads. On September 4, 2013 Toews signed a contract with the Reading Royals.

== International play ==
Toews' first experience with Hockey Canada came as a member of the national under-18 team when, on August 8, 2007, he was named to the roster for the 2007 Ivan Hlinka Memorial Tournament. Toews recorded one assist in four games played through the tournament as Canada was defeated 5–4 by Russia in the bronze-medal game.

== Career statistics ==
=== Regular season and playoffs ===
			Regular season					Playoffs
Season	Team	League	GP	G	A	Pts	PIM	GP	G	A	Pts	PIM
2006–07	Shattuck St. Mary's	Midget AAA	61	34	47	81	52	—	—	—	—	—
2007–08	Shattuck St. Mary's	Midget AAA	51	44	56	100	20	—	—	—	—	—
2008–09	University of North Dakota	WCHA	23	5	6	11	4	—	—	—	—	—
2009–10	University of North Dakota	WCHA	32	4	11	15	12	—	—	—	—	—
2010–11	Brandon Wheat Kings	WHL	60	20	28	48	16	6	2	5	7	2
2011–12	Rockford IceHogs	AHL	2	0	0	0	0	—	—	—	—	—
2011–12	Toledo Walleye	ECHL	42	3	11	14	34	—	—	—	—	—
2012–13	Bakersfield Condors	ECHL	26	2	4	6	16	—	—	—	—	—
2012–13	Idaho Steelheads	ECHL	31	9	14	23	12	—	—	—	—	—
2012–13	Utah Grizzlies	ECHL	2	0	1	1	0	—	—	—	—	—
ECHL totals			101	14	30	44	62	—	—	—	—	—

=== International ===
Year	Team	Event	Result	GP	G	A	Pts	PIM
2007	Canada	IH18	4th	4	0	1	1	6
Junior totals				4	0	1	1	6
