= 2011 Canada Winter Games =

Multi-sport event in Halifax, Nova Scotia

- 12th Canada Winter Games; 23rd Canada Games
- Host city: Halifax, Nova Scotia
- Country: Canada
- Provinces and Territories: 13
- Athletes: 2321
- Events: 166 in 21 sports
- Opening: February 11
- Closing: February 27
- Main venue: Halifax Metro Centre

Winter

The 2011 Canada Winter Games were held in Halifax, Nova Scotia, from Friday, 11 February 2011, to Sunday, 27 February 2011.

== Bids ==
Four bids (all from Nova Scotia, as it was that province's turn) were made for the games, and eventually Halifax was selected to stage the games.

- Halifax
- Annapolis Valley
- Truro, Wentworth and Brookfield with other communities.
- Antigonish, Pictou, Guysborough and Port Hawkesbury

Wentworth was part of one of the losing bids, but did end up hosting the alpine skiing and freestyle skiing events at these games.

== Medal table ==
The following is the medal table for the 2011 Canada Winter Games.

* Host nation ( Nova Scotia)

Rank	Nation	Gold	Silver	Bronze	Total
1	Quebec	51	43	43	137
2	Ontario	45	34	31	110
3	British Columbia	28	30	30	88
4	Alberta	20	35	30	85
5	Saskatchewan	7	9	7	23
6	Manitoba	5	7	13	25
7	Nova Scotia*	5	6	1	12
8	Yukon	3	1	1	5
9	New Brunswick	2	5	9	16
10	Prince Edward Island	2	0	4	6
11	Newfoundland and Labrador	0	1	4	5
Totals (11 entries)		168	171	173	512

- 3 bronze medals were awarded in the freestyle skiing men's halfpipe.
- 2 golds and one bronze medal award in female all around in artistic gymnastics, no silver medal was awarded.
- 2 bronze medals awarded in women's artistic gymnastics balance beam and men's rings.
- 2 gold medals awarded in men's artistic gymnastics pommel horse and horizontal bar, no silver medals were awarded in either event.
- No bronze and silver medals awarded in dance (solo) special Olympics Level II male and female figure skating.

== Flag points/Centennial Cup ==
Ontario won the flag points competition, and Nova Scotia won the Centennial Cup.

== Participating provinces and territories ==
All 13 provinces and territories competed.

- Alberta (242)
- British Columbia (242)
- Manitoba (224)
- New Brunswick (200)
- Newfoundland and Labrador (97)
- Northwest Territories (103)
- Nova Scotia (222) (hosts)
- Nunavut (28)
- Ontario (260)
- Prince Edward Island (147)
- Quebec (254)
- Saskatchewan (223)
- Yukon (107)

== Sports ==
- Alpine skiing (10)
- Archery (6)
- Artistic gymnastics (14)
- Badminton (6)
- Biathlon (8)
- Boxing (9)
- Cross-country skiing (20)
- Curling (2)
- Figure skating (14)
- Freestyle skiing (8)
- Ice hockey (2)
- Judo (16)
- Ringette (1)
- Shooting (8)
- Short track speed skating (10)
- Snowboarding (6)
- Squash (2)
- Speed skating (12)
- Synchronized swimming (4)
- Table tennis (7)
- Wheelchair basketball (1)

== Schedule ==
The schedule for the 2011 Canada Games (19 February is a crossover day):

●	Opening ceremony	Event competitions	●	Event finals	Exhibition gala	●	Closing ceremony

February 2011	11th Fri	12th Sat	13th Sun	14th Mon	15th Tue	16th Wed	17th Thu	18th Fri	19th Sat	20th Sun	21st Mon	22nd Tue	23rd Wed	24th Thu	25th Fri	26th Sat	27th Sun	Gold medals
Alpine skiing											2	2	2	2	2			10
Archery														4	2			6
Artistic gymnastics			1	1	1	1	10											14
Badminton													5				1	6
Biathlon			2		2	2		2										8
Boxing															9			9
Cross-country skiing											6	6		6		2		20
Curling								1								1		2
Figure skating											2	2	4	6				14
Freestyle skiing			2		2	2	2											8
Ice hockey								1								1		2
Judo													7	7		2		16
Ringette								1										1
Shooting				2	2	2	2											8
Short track speed skating			2	2		2	4											10
Snowboarding												2		2		2		6
Squash							2											2
Speed skating		3	3	2		4												12
Synchronized swimming												1			2	1		4
Table tennis													2			5		7
Wheelchair basketball							1											1
Total gold medals		3	10	7	7	13	21	5	0	0	10	13	20	27	15	14	1	167
Cumulative total		3	13	20	27	40	61	67	67	67	77	90	110	137	152	166	167	167
Ceremonies	●																●	
February 2011	11th Fri	12th Sat	13th Sun	14th Mon	15th Tue	16th Wed	17th Thu	18th Fri	19th Sat	20th Sun	21st Mon	22nd Tue	23rd Wed	24th Thu	25th Fri	26th Sat	27th Sun	Gold medals

== Venues ==
- Canada Games Centre: artistic gymnastics, badminton, synchronized swimming
- Canada Games Oval: long track speed skating
- Citadel High School: wheelchair basketball, table tennis
- Cole Harbour Place: ringette
- Dartmouth Sportsplex: ice hockey
- Halifax Forum: boxing
- Halifax Metro Centre: ice hockey
- Mayflower Curling Club: curling
- Sackville High School: shooting, archery
- St. Mary's University: squash, judo
- Ski Martock: biathlon, cross-country skiing, snowboarding
- Ski Wentworth: freestyle skiing, alpine skiing
- St. Margaret's Centre: short track speed skating, figure skating
