= NATO Satellite Ground Terminal Folly Lake =

Canadian military facility

Coordinates: 45°33′40″N 63°32′39″W

NATO Satellite Ground Terminal Folly Lake, also known as SGT Folly Lake, is a decommissioned Canadian military satellite communications facility located in Wentworth, Cumberland County, Nova Scotia. At one time it was one of 24 satellite communication facilities for the North Atlantic Treaty Organization (NATO) that were located in NATO countries.

SGT Folly Lake was one of two such facilities in Canada and was located on the west slope of an unnamed hill along the eastern side of the Wentworth Valley, opposite Higgins Mountain. The second facility was located at CFS Carp. SGT Folly Lake's location was approximately 500 m (1,600 ft) north of the county line and is closest to the community of Folly Lake in Colchester County and approximately 3.2 km (2.0 mi) north from the northern edge of the lake of the same name. SGT Folly Lake was built in 1982 and decommissioned in December 2006. It was owned by the Department of National Defence and operated by Canadian Forces personnel as a lodger unit of CFB Halifax.

== Facility description ==
The site contained five buildings:

- two-storey Operations Building (Control), constructed in 1982 with a footprint of 1,144.54 m^{2} (12,319.7 sq ft)
- one-storey Garage, constructed in 1982 with a footprint of 40.30 m^{2} (433.8 sq ft)
- one-storey Gate House, constructed in 1982 located at the security gate with a footprint of 14.54 m^{2} (156.5 sq ft)
- one-storey Radar Dome (for shielding the satellite dish), constructed in 1982 with a footprint of 89 m^{2} (960 sq ft)
- one-storey Storage Barn, constructed in 1990 located off the parking lot with a footprint of 25.27 m^{2} (272.0 sq ft)

== Facility operation ==
Constructed in 1982 by the Department of National Defence as part of Canada's NATO obligations, SGT Folly Lake, along with a similar facility at Kester, Belgium, was an AN/FSQ173 control terminal for control of NATO Tactical Satellites (TACSAT). It had supplies in the form of 30 days of food, as well as diesel fuel that would run two Caterpillar D-8 generators. Although not hardened to withstand a near or direct nuclear attack, the facility's electronics were shielded to withstand the electromagnetic pulse (EMP) and associated nuclear fallout created by the atmospheric detonation of a nuclear weapon. The Operations Building was constructed with a radio frequency shield around it that would stop the EMP from destroying the equipment; the AN/FSQ173 control equipment was placed in a hardened shell that would protect the crew from the nuclear fallout.

SGT Folly Lake was operated by 24 Canadian Forces personnel working in several shifts; the primary day shift consisting of two supply technicians, two administration technicians, a coolant technician, a power plant technician, and a detachment commander. There was also a civilian engineer from the Department of National Defence. There were always two personnel stationed at SGT Folly Lake 24 hours a day year-round; they worked in rotating 3 day shifts whereby they lived at the facility for 3 days on and then had 2 days off. The living quarters in the Operations Building was equipped with bedrooms, washrooms, showers, a kitchen, and a living room which had a television and VCR/DVD. Outside there was a deck with a barbecue and horseshoe pits. Most personnel commuted to the facility from Moncton, New Brunswick, Truro, Nova Scotia or Halifax, Nova Scotia, however, until the closure of CFS Debert in 1998 personnel were stationed at that nearby base.

Personnel stationed at SGT Folly Lake received 1 year of basic electronics training, 1 year of advanced electronics training and a 3-month course in advanced satellite communications training taken in Latina, Italy. They also had a minimum of 5 years of on-the-job/operational experience although most people had 10–13 years experience.

The 13.716 m (45.00 ft) diameter satellite uplink dish was located on a perfectly flat concrete pad shielded by the Radar Dome. The dish had electro-mechanical actuators and was constantly tracking a NATO satellite positioned in geosynchronous orbit off the coast of Africa which broadcast a signal in the Super High Frequency (SHF). In this signal there could be 10,000 different channels of information which was received at SGT Folly Lake by a low-noise amplifier located on the dish. The amplified signal was then sent to a de-multiplexer which translated the signal into the appropriate channels and routed them to their correct destinations. Military NATO communications traffic was sent to the Telegraph Automated Relay Equipment (TARE) located at CFS Debert (until 1994), while civilian NATO communications traffic was sent through the local telecommunications company Maritime Telegraph and Telephone Company (MT&T). The system allowed voice, video, faxes, teletype, and digital information to be sent.

== Decommissioning ==
SGT Folly Lake was decommissioned by the Canadian Forces in December 2006 after it was deemed surplus to NATO communications requirements following the end of the Cold War, as well as changes in NATO tactical satellites (TACSAT) that made the AN/FSQ173 control system outdated.

SGT Folly Lake had been costly to maintain as the electronics required a tremendous amount of energy; the residual heat being used to heat the buildings.

SGT Folly Lake was sold in 2009 by the Canada Lands Company.

== See also ==
- NATO Communications and Information Systems Services Agency
