= Folly Lake =

Folly Lake is the name of two lakes and a community in Nova Scotia, Canada:

- Folly Lake (Annapolis County), in Annapolis County
- Folly Lake (Colchester County), in Colchester County
  - Folly Lake (community), a community on the shore of the latter lake
