= 2011 in shooting =

This article lists the main target shooting events and their results for 2011.

== World Events ==
=== International Shooting Sport Federation ===
- September: 2011 World Shotgun Championships, held in Belgrade, Serbia

==== ISSF World Cup ====
- 2011 ISSF World Cup

=== International Confederation of Fullbore Rifle Associations ===
2011 ICFRA World Long Range Championships - Belmont, Brisbane, Australia
Event	Gold	Silver	Bronze
Palma Trophy	Great Britain	South Africa	United States
Individual	R Jeens (GBR)	A de Toit (RSA)	DC Luckman (GBR)
Under-25 Champion	A du Toit (RSA)		
Veterans Champion	TJ Whitaker (USA)		

=== International Practical Shooting Confederation ===
- 2011 IPSC Handgun World Shoot held on the Kalamonas Shooting Range in Rhodes, Greece

=== FITASC ===
2011 Results

=== Island Games ===
- June 28 - July 1: Shooting at the 2011 Island Games on the Sainham Range on the Isle of Wight.

=== Military World Games ===
- July 15–24: Shooting at the 2011 Military World Games in Rio de Janeiro, Brazil

=== Summer Universiade ===
- August 18-22: Shooting at the 2011 Summer Universiade in Shenzhen, China

== Regional Events ==
=== Africa ===
==== African Shooting Championships ====
- October 15-25: 2011 African Shooting Championship was due to be held in Cairo in February 2011. It was postponed until October due to civil unrest surrounding the 2011 Egyptian revolution
- May 25 - June 3: 2011 African Shotgun Championships held in Rabat, Morocco

=== Americas ===
==== Pan American Games ====
- October 15-23: Shooting at the 2011 Pan American Games held in Guadalajara, Mexico

=== Asia ===
==== Asian Shooting Championships ====
- October 17-23: 2011 Asian Airgun Championships held on in Kuwait City, Kuwait.
- November 21 - December 1: 2011 Asian Shotgun Championships in Kuala Lumpur, Malaysia

==== Pan Arab Games ====
- December 9-23: Shooting at the 2011 Pan Arab Games held in Doha, Qatar

==== Pacific Games ====
- August 30 - September 1: Shooting at the 2011 Pacific Games in Nouméa, New Caledonia

==== Southeast Asian Games ====
- June 6-12: Shooting at the 2011 Southeast Asian Games at Jakabaring Shooting Range, Palembang, Indonesia

=== Europe ===
==== European Shooting Confederation ====
- March 3-6: 2011 European 10 m Events Championships in Brescia, Italy
- July 31 - August 14: 2011 European Shooting Championships in Belgrade, Serbia

==== Games of the Small States of Europe ====
- May 31 - June 3: Shooting at the 2011 Games of the Small States of Europe held in Liechtenstein

==== "B Matches" ====
- February 3-5: InterShoot in Den Haag, Netherlands
- RIAC held in Strassen, Luxembourg

== National Events ==
=== Canada ===
==== Canada Winter Games ====
- February 14-17: Shooting at the 2011 Canada Winter Games held at Sackville High School in Nova Scotia.

=== United Kingdom ===
==== NRA Imperial Meeting ====
- July, held at the National Shooting Centre, Bisley
  - Queen's Prize winner: ES Compton (GBR)
  - Grand Aggregate winner: Dr GCD Barnett
  - Ashburton Shield winners: Epsom College
  - Kolapore Winners: Great Britain (GBR)
  - Junior Kolapore winners: Normandy, France (FRA)
  - National Trophy Winners: Scotland (SCO)
  - Elcho Shield winners: Scotland (SCO)
  - Vizianagram winners: House of Commons

==== NSRA National Meeting ====
- August, held at the National Shooting Centre, Bisley
  - Earl Roberts British Prone Champion: Michelle Smith (GBR)

=== USA ===
- 2011 NCAA Rifle Championships, won by West Virginia Mountaineers
