= Alpine skiing at the 2011 Canada Winter Games =

Alpine skiing at the 2011 Canada Winter Games was at Ski Wentworth in Truro, NS. It was played the 20 to 25 February. There were 10 events of Alpine skiing.

== Medal table ==
The following is the medal table for alpine skiing at the 2011 Canada Winter Games.

* Host nation (Nova Scotia)

Rank	Nation	Gold	Silver	Bronze	Total
1	Ontario	4	4	4	12
2	Quebec	4	2	4	10
3	Alberta	1	3	0	4
4	British Columbia	1	1	2	4
5	Nova Scotia*	0	0	0	0
Totals (5 entries)		10	10	10	30

== Men's events ==
Event	Gold		Silver		Bronze	
Giant slalom	Kyle Farrow; Ontario	2:00.760	Tony Naciuk; Alberta	2:00.830	Francis Toutant; Quebec	2:01.800
Giant slalom para	James Binsfeld; Ontario	2:06.290	Michael Whitney; Ontario	2:10.770	Caleb Brousseau; British Columbia	2:13.020
Slalom	Gabriel Presseault; Quebec	1:48.700	Kyle Farrow; Ontario	1:49.170	Patrick McConville; Ontario	1:49.300
Slalom para	Michael Whitney; Ontario	1:50.400	Braydon Luscombe; British Columbia	1:55.310	James Binsfeld; Ontario	2:01.010
Super-combined	Broderick Thompson; British Columbia	1:39.110	Gabriel Presseault; Quebec	1:39.810	Tomas Syrovatka; Quebec	1:39.910

== Women's events ==
Event	Gold		Silver		Bronze	
Giant slalom	Mary Hemphill; Ontario	2:04.320	Devon Clarke; Ontario	2:04.560	Kailee Darlington; British Columbia	2:05.050
Giant slalom para	Alex Starker; Alberta	2:20.430	Alana Ramsay; Alberta	2:23.320	Sandy Robinson; Ontario	2:30.080
Slalom	Sandrine David; Quebec	1:34.990	Kelly Moore; Quebec	1:35.520	Candace Crawford; Ontario	1:36.060
Slalom para	Alex Starker; Quebec	1:52.640	Vanessa Knight; Alberta	2:05.640	Alana Ramsay; Quebec	2:19.260
Super-combined	Sandrine David; Quebec	1:46.030	Meg Currie; Ontario	1:46.930	Kelly Moore; Quebec	1:46.930
