= Geoff Richards =

Geoff or Geoffrey Richards may refer to:

- Geoff Richards (footballer) (1929–2014), English football winger
- Geoff Richards (rugby union) (born 1951), former rugby union player and coach
- Geoff Richards (professor), Director of AO Research and Development at the AO Foundation
- Geoffrey Richards (cross country skier) in Cross-country skiing at the 2011 Canada Winter Games

== See also ==
- Jeff Richards (disambiguation)
