= Wentworth Valley =

Valley in Nova Scotia, Canada

Coordinates: 45°35′54.82″N 63°33′43.08″W

The Wentworth Valley is a valley in the Cobequid Mountains of northwestern Nova Scotia, Canada. It comprises the lowest elevation pass through the Cobequids. It was named after the colonial governor John Wentworth (1792-1808).

== Physical geography ==
The valley is oriented north–south and is located in a glacial trough named the "Folly Gap" (originally spelled "Folleigh"). The section framed by mountains measures approximately 8 km (5.0 mi) in length, from Folly Lake in the south to Wentworth Provincial Park in the north with the width of the valley floor varying from 0.5 km (0.31 mi) in the south to 1.5 km (0.93 mi) in the north.

The west wall of the valley is formed by Higgins Mountain (360 m (1,180 ft) elevation) and the east wall is formed by several unnamed peaks (290 m (950 ft)-330 m (1,080 ft) elevation). The south end and highest point of the trough is Folly Lake (190 m (620 ft) elevation) which drains south to the Bay of Fundy through the Folly River, therefore its waters do not enter the valley.

The Wallace River flows north through the valley to the Northumberland Strait from its source in Dicks Meadows on Higgins Mountain.

The trough descends abruptly north of Folly Lake where over a distance of approximately 2 km (1.2 mi) the valley floor levels out at approximately 120 m (390 ft) elevation. From there, the valley floor and the serpentine Wallace River gradually descends over the next 14 km (8.7 mi) to approximately 30 m (98 ft) elevation at the junction with the West Branch Wallace River.

== Transportation ==
In 1872 the Intercolonial Railway built its mainline between Halifax and Rivière-du-Loup through the valley, rising along its western walls to gain altitude to reach the summit at Folly Lake. Today, these tracks are part of Canadian National Railway's Springhill Subdivision and continue to form part of the mainline from Halifax to central Canada, hosting both freight and passenger trains.

Roads followed the railway during the 20th century and Trunk 4 was built through the valley and over Folly Mountain to the south. During the early 1960s this road was redesignated Highway 104, forming part of the Trans-Canada Highway. A 45 km (28 mi) long realignment of Highway 104 opened as a toll highway on November 15, 1997, completely bypassing the valley. Located approximately 10 km (6.2 mi) west of the valley, this new section of highway is named Cobequid Pass and was built at a much higher elevation than the Wentworth Valley, since it crosses the summit of Westchester Mountain at 270 m (890 ft) elevation. Following this realignment, the former Highway 104 alignment in the valley reverted to its original Trunk 4 designation and is currently classed as a secondary road.

== Settlements ==
The valley contains the following communities from south to north:

- Folly Lake
- Wentworth (including the railway point named Wentworth Station and a hamlet named East Wentworth)
- Wentworth Centre
- West Wentworth
- Lower Wentworth

== Economy ==
The Wentworth Valley is economically dependent on the towns of Truro and Amherst for most goods and services.

The valley is a recreational centre in the winter months due to it being the location of Ski Wentworth, the largest alpine ski hill in Nova Scotia. The valley is also home to the deactivated Folly Lake Satellite Ground Terminal previously operated by NATO.

In the nineteenth century there were watermills on the Folly and Wallace Rivers and copper was mined from the bedrock. A copper smelter operated for a short time at West Wentworth.
