= Simon Porter =

Simon Porter may refer to:

- Simon Porter (cricketer), English cricketer
- Simon Porter (MP), member of parliament for Reading, and also mayor
- Simon Porter (gymnast), competed in Artistic gymnastics at the 2011 Canada Winter Games
