= Freestyle skiing at the 2011 Canada Winter Games =

Freestyle skiing at the 2011 Canada Winter Games was held at the Ski Wentworth in Cobequid Mountains, Nova Scotia.

The events will be held during the first week between February 13 and 17, 2011.

== Medal table ==
The following is the medal table for alpine skiing at the 2011 Canada Winter Games.

* Host nation ( Nova Scotia)

Rank	Nation	Gold	Silver	Bronze	Total
1	British Columbia	4	2	2	8
2	Quebec	2	3	4	9
3	Alberta	2	0	2	4
4	Ontario	0	3	2	5
5	Nova Scotia*	0	0	0	0
Totals (5 entries)		8	8	10	26

== Men's events ==
Event	Gold		Silver		Bronze	
Moguls	Simon Lemieux; Quebec	24.140	Kerrian Chunlaud; Quebec	23.590	Luke Ulsifer; Alberta	23.110
Aerials*	Max Heard; British Columbia	75.90	Noah Morrison; British Columbia	75.21	Evan McEachran; Ontario	74.52
Halfpipe	Aaron MacKay; Alberta	38.400	Max Heard; British Columbia	38.000	Austin Hunter; Alberta; Hunter Visser; British Columbia; Hugo Blanchette; Quebec	37.100
Dual moguls	Simon Lemieux; Quebec		Zac Hoffman; Ontario		Hugo Blanchette; Quebec	

- The Aerials event is a best of two jumps (the total is not added together)

== Women's events ==
Event	Gold		Silver		Bronze	
Moguls	Andi Naude; British Columbia	24.420	Katrine Bazinet; Quebec	23.140	Julie Bureau; Quebec	23.090
Aerials*	Cassie Sharpe; British Columbia	56.60	Jillian Gordon; Ontario	56.30	Yuki Tsubota; British Columbia	56.01
Halfpipe	Meagan Fiselier; Alberta	35.300	Dara Elizabeth Howell; Ontario	35.000	Jillian Gordon; Ontario	31.200
Dual moguls	Andi Naude; British Columbia		Myriam Leclerc; Quebec		Katrine Bazinet; Quebec	

- The Aerials event is a best of two jumps (the total is not added together)
