= Biathlon at the 2011 Canada Winter Games =

Biathlon at the 2011 Canada Winter Games was held at the Ski Martock near Windsor, Nova Scotia.

The events were held during the first week between February 13 and 18, 2011.

== Medal table ==
The following is the medal table for alpine skiing at the 2011 Canada Winter Games.

* Host nation ( Nova Scotia)

Rank	Nation	Gold	Silver	Bronze	Total
1	Alberta	4	4	3	11
2	Quebec	3	4	1	8
3	British Columbia	1	0	4	5
4	Nova Scotia*	0	0	0	0
Totals (4 entries)		8	8	8	24

== Men's events ==
Event	Gold		Silver		Bronze	
Individual 15km	Scott Gow; Alberta	40:33.9	Stuart Harden; Alberta	42:16.0	Christian Gow; Alberta	43:29.0
Sprint 10km	Scott Gow; Alberta	29:02.4	Aaron Gillmor; Alberta	29:45.2	Stuart Harden; Alberta	29:55.2
Pursuit 12.5km	Scott Gow; Alberta	32:41.8	Christian Gow; Alberta	34:32.2	Stuart Harden; Alberta	34:53.8
Relay	Alberta	59:33.0	Quebec	1:00:01.4	British Columbia	1:04:48.7

== Women's events ==
Event	Gold		Silver		Bronze	
Individual 12.5km	Audrey Vaillancourt; Quebec	39:31.7	Rose-Marie Côté; Quebec	42:15.0	Sarah Beaudry; British Columbia	45:31.8
Sprint 7.5km	Sarah Beaudry; British Columbia	39:31.7	Audrey Vaillancourt; Quebec	42:15.0	Julia Ransom; British Columbia	45:31.8
Pursuit 10km	Audrey Vaillancourt; Quebec	34:44.5	Yolaine Oddou; Quebec	35:11.6	Rose-Marie Côté; Quebec	36:21.8
Relay	Quebec	1:01:22.0	Alberta	1:04:53.1	British Columbia	1:05:34.8
