= Folly Mountain =

Community in Nova Scotia, Canada

Coordinates: 45°27′49.47″N 63°31′38.07″W

Folly Mountain in Nova Scotia

Folly Mountain is a mountain and a community in the Canadian province of Nova Scotia, located in Colchester County on Trunk 4 in the Cobequid Hills.

Previous to the opening of the Cobequid Pass, Trunk 4 was numbered for Highway 104 the Trans Canada Highway, passing over Folly Mountain and through Folly Lake to the Wentworth Valley. Due to high number of fatal accidents the Trans Canada Highway moved to the Cobequid Pass on Highway 104 when it was completed. Today the section of Trunk 4 is open to vehicles other than transport trucks that must use the Cobequid Pass.
