= Archery at the 2011 Canada Winter Games =

Archery at the 2011 Canada Winter Games was at Sackville High School in Halifax, NS. It was held from the 22 to 25 February. There were 6 events of archery.

== Medal table ==
The following is the medal table for alpine skiing at the 2011 Canada Winter Games.

* Host nation (Nova Scotia)

Rank	Nation	Gold	Silver	Bronze	Total
1	Saskatchewan	2	2	0	4
2	Quebec	2	1	1	4
3	Ontario	1	2	2	5
4	Alberta	1	1	2	4
5	British Columbia	0	0	1	1
6	Nova Scotia*	0	0	0	0
Totals (6 entries)		6	6	6	18

== Men's events ==
Event	Gold		Silver		Bronze	
Individual compound	Christopher Perkins; Ontario	114	Michael Kupchanko; Saskatchewan	113	Keenan Brown; Ontario	115
Individual recurve	Connor Sorley; Saskatchewan	116	Cody Berube; Ontario	109	Brendan Sheridan; Alberta	117

== Women's events ==
Event	Gold		Silver		Bronze	
Individual compound	Jenah Smith; Saskatchewan	115	Camille Demers; Quebec	112	Kira Mercereau; Alberta	109
Individual recurve	Virginie Chénier; Quebec	112	Jordan Sequillion; Ontario	110	Brenna Price; British Columbia	112

== Mixed events ==
Event	Gold		Silver		Bronze	
Team compound	Simon Rousseau and Camille Demers; Quebec	229	Ian Bouvier and Kira Mercereau; Alberta	226	Christopher Perkins and Janeen Howie; Ontario	230
Team recurve	Brendan Sheridan and Caitlyn Schleppe; Alberta	222	Connor Sorley and Kayla Fawcett; Saskatchewan	214	William Gravel and Virginie Chénier; Quebec	222
