= Cockney (disambiguation) =

Cockney and similar terms may mean:

- In England, Cockney is a dialect spoken mainly by working-class and lower-middle-class Londoners, or a label applied to speakers of the dialect; especially people from the East End or born within earshot of Bow Bells
- In Australia, a cocknie is a young Australasian snapper fish smaller than legal size
- Konkani people, an ethnic group from India

It may also refer to:

- Jesse Cockney (born 1989), Canadian cross-country skier
- "Cockneys", a Series C episode of the television series QI (2005)
