= Snowboarding at the 2011 Canada Winter Games =

Snowboarding at the 2011 Canada Winter Games was at the Ski Martock in Halifax, NS. It was held from the 20 to 25 February. There were 10 events of Alpine Skiing.

== Medal table ==
The following is the medal table for alpine skiing at the 2011 Canada Winter Games.

* Host nation (Nova Scotia)

Rank	Nation	Gold	Silver	Bronze	Total
1	Ontario	3	1	2	6
2	Quebec	2	2	3	7
3	Nova Scotia*	1	0	0	1
4	British Columbia	0	2	1	3
5	Alberta	0	1	0	1
Totals (5 entries)		6	6	6	18

== Men's events ==
Event	Gold		Silver		Bronze	
Parallel giant slalom	Taylor Dee; Ontario	1:41.17	Richard Evanoff; Ontario	1:42.16	Sébastien Beaulieu; Quebec	1:42.83
Halfpipe	Jeremy Page; Nova Scotia	31.20	Joe Hills; Alberta	30.30	Frank Lachance; Quebec	30.10
Snowboard cross	Antony Damour; Quebec	58.66	Tommy Pitman; British Columbia	1:00.74	Faro Burgoyne; British Columbia	1:01.29

== Women's events ==
Event	Gold		Silver		Bronze	
Parallel giant slalom	Hannah Silk; Ontario	1:52.29	Jade Depont; Quebec	1:53.29	Jessica Herron; Ontario	1:53.38
Halfpipe	Quincy Korte-King; Ontario	31.60	Audrey McManiman; Quebec	30.60	Kiersten Higginson; Ontario	28.90
Snowboard cross	Justine Côté; Quebec	1:03.86	Taylor Wilton; British Columbia	1:05.80	Aurélye Hudon; Quebec	1:06.42
