= AO Foundation =

Medical organisation based in Switzerland

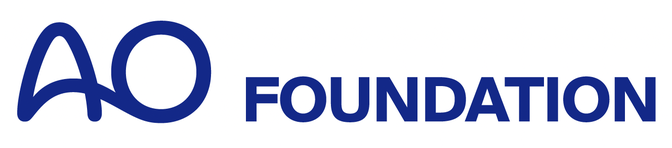
- Formation: 1958; 68 years ago Biel, Switzerland
- Type: not-for-profit
- Purpose: Treatment of trauma and disorders of the musculoskeletal system
- Key people: Maurice Edmond Müller, Robert Schneider, Hans Willenegger, Martin Allgöwer
- Website: aofoundation.org

The AO Foundation is a nonprofit organization dedicated to improving the care of patients with musculoskeletal injuries or pathologies and their sequelae through research, development, and education of surgeons and operating room personnel. The AO Foundation is credited with revolutionizing operative fracture treatment and pioneering the development of bone implants and instruments.

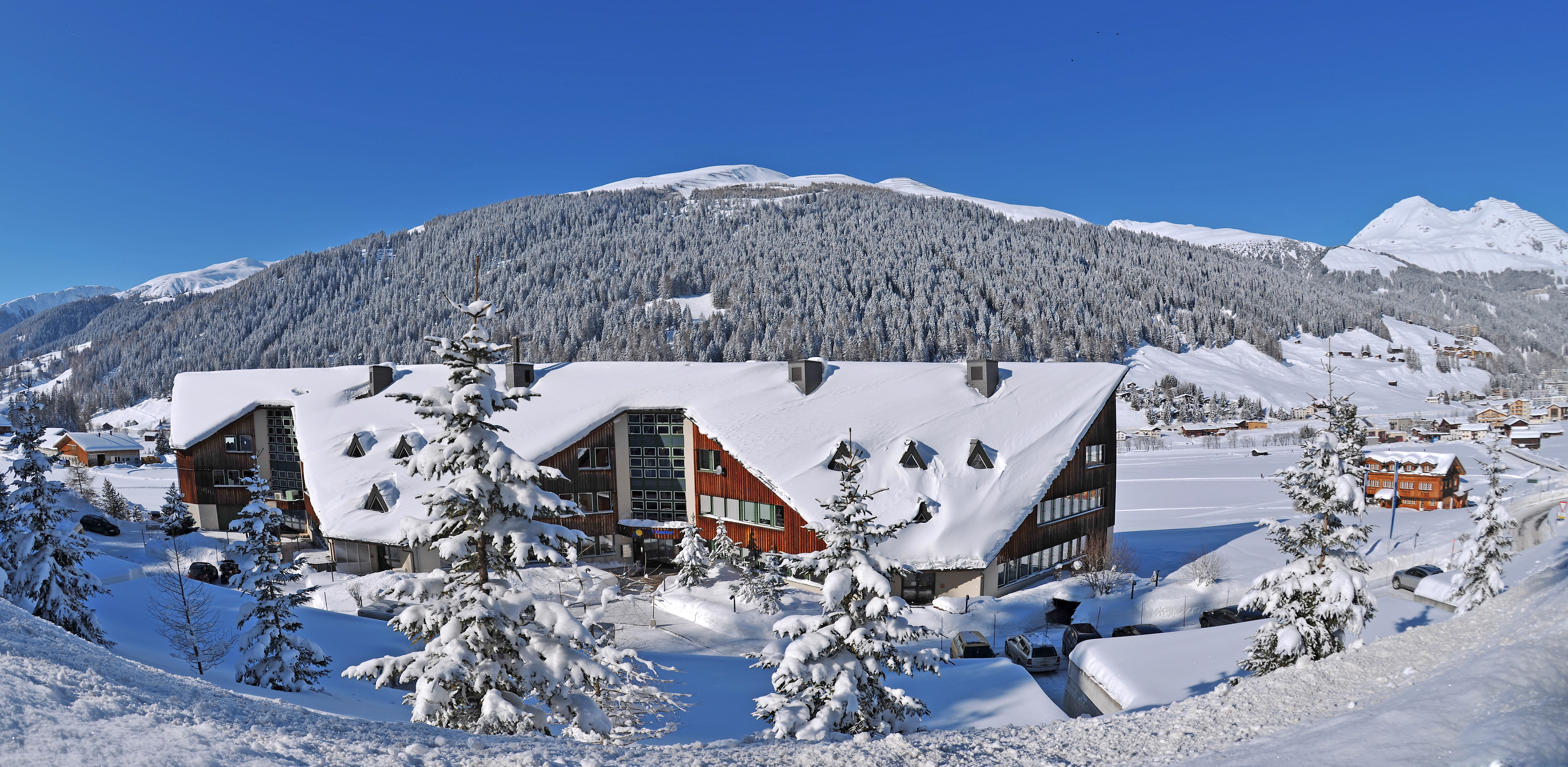
The AO Center at Davos

The foundation has its origins in a Swiss study group named Arbeitsgemeinschaft für Osteosynthesefragen (Association of the Study of Internal Fixation), commonly referred to as the AO, that was founded in Switzerland in 1958 as a society. The AO became a foundation in December 1984.

== History ==
=== Background ===
On March 1, 1950 Maurice Müller, one of the founding members of the AO, visited a 70-year old Belgian surgeon named Robert Danis in Brussels, who had been experimenting and treating fracture patients surgically for 25 years. At the time Dr. Müller was 32 years old, and had been practicing medicine for 6 years. The standard of treatment for fractures at the time was the method usually called "conservative treatment," as originally documented and popularized by Lorenz Böhler. This approach focused on reducing fractures and stabilizing them with splints and plaster, followed by traction. By the time of Müller's visit, Danis had already published 2 books on osteosynthesis, Technique de l'Ostéosynthèse (1932, Paris), and Theorie et pratique de l'osteosynthese (1949, Paris).

The one day that Maurice Müller spent in Brussels with Dr. Danis was a significant moment for Müller's subsequent work, who said that Danis' 1949 book was one of the most important works that he had ever read; he also took samples of Danis' own instruments, including one plate and screws, along with the contact information of the manufacturer in Belgium. He quickly developed his own ideas on how to improve the techniques he had seen from Danis. Between 1951 and 1957, Müller performed numerous surgeries in which he applied what he had learnt from surgical treatment of fractures as well as techniques he developed by himself, first at the General Hospital of the Canton of Fribourg, where he worked as Chief Resident, later at the Balgrist Orthopedic Clinic, and later at the private Hirslanden Clinic.

=== Founding ===
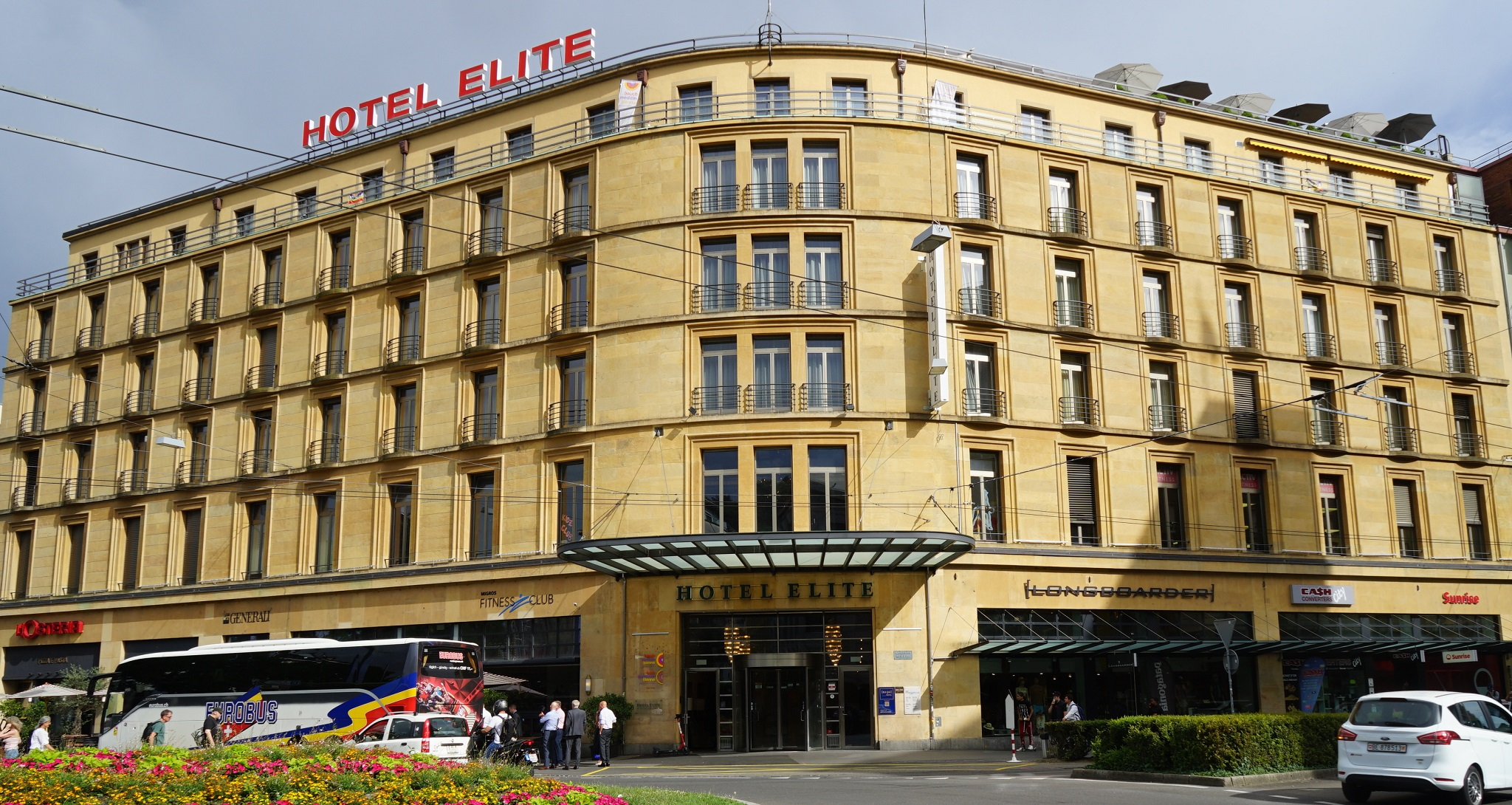
Hotel Elite in Biel/Bienne, where the AO Foundation was founded

Maurice Müller had an agreement with the Balgrist Orthopedic Clinic, through which he enjoyed a day off every week that he used to travel around the region visiting hospitals and other like-minded surgeons. This helped Müller develop a network, which, paired with his reputation of a very talented surgeon, got him recommended and requested to operate on difficult cases in hospitals around the country. In December 1957, Maurice Müller delivered a lecture at the University of Zürich, upon receiving his PD (private lecturer) degree. During his lecture he presented a set of orthopedic surgery principles that he developed, which would soon evolve to become the AO Principles of Fracture Management. In 1958, Müller and some of his close colleagues met and agreed to create a school of thought for surgical orthopedic techniques. It was agreed to call the group the Arbeitsgemeinschaft für Osteosynthesefragen, shortened to the AO.

In the frame of the Swiss Surgical Society meeting in Bern in November 1958, Müller organized the first meeting of the AO, which 12 other surgeons would attend. The meeting took place at the Hotel Elite in Biel/Bienne, and the agenda for the day included a presentation of Müller's Instrumentarium, a set of implants, screws, and tools he developed and fine-tuned first with Zulauf, a woodworking tools manufacturer, and later in collaboration with Robert Mathys, a mechanical engineer from the city of Bettlach, in Switzerland, who owned a small shop specialized in designing and producing stainless steel screws. The agenda also included a discussion on who would manufacture the implants and tools. Successive meetings covered the AO's legal statutes and by-laws.

=== Growth phase ===
The various instruments that Müller and other AO founders had been using until 1958 was an assortment of existing tools and parts which didn't always match or work well together. The first AO efforts consisted of developing a standardized toolset that was easy to use and had a full tool-implant compatibility. The first version of the AO Instrumentarium consisted of a set of six color-coded aluminium cases, containing pre-sterilized screws, plates, and tools. The AO team ordered 20 of these sets from Mathys, which would be first tested by the AO surgeons, and later used for the first AO course to be held in Davos in December 1960. The AO had decided that surgeons who wanted to purchase the AO Instrumentarium would first have to be trained in its proper use, as well as the latest surgical fracture techniques that the AO founding surgeons decided to teach.

The AO developed a business model that would provide funding for all AO research activities, the funding of an AO Documentation Center, and the AO educational activities, via licensing fees that the instrument producers would pay. To manage the administration of this industrial area of the AO, Müller recommended to create a company, which would be called Synthes AG Chur.

From 1963 to the early 1980s, the AO developed new implants, tools, and devices; appointed new manufacturers for the AO-developed solutions; and assigned distributors throughout most of the world. The AO Instrumentarium grew from around 200 items in 1961 to over 1,200 items in the early 1980s, and licensing fees in 1982 amounted to over 10 million Swiss Francs, by 1985 it was 13 million Swiss Francs.

Toward the end of the 1980s, the AO Instrumentarium was being manufactured and marketed by 3 companies: Mathys (privately owned by the Mathys family), Stratec (privately owned by the Straumann family), and Synthes US (privately held and majority owned by Hansjörg Wyss). Synthes US acquired the business from the Straumann family in 1999, and the newly formed Synthes-Stratec company acquired the Mathys business 4 years later, in 2003.

=== Full transformation and decoupling of the industrial branch ===
The AO changed its legal status from an association to a foundation in 1984. The significant sales growth of the AO Instrumentarium enjoyed from the 1980s through the 2000s had resulted in royalties payments growing from 14 million Swiss francs in 1986 to 84.1 million Swiss francs in 2004. Some surgeons—leaders in the AO organization—were concerned about the over-marketing of AO products, while others were concerned that they shouldn't profit from the sales of the implants and the devices they used in surgeries for their patients. These concerns, coupled with an increasingly competitive global business landscape in the implant business and a consolidated, single manufacturer and distributor of the AO-approved products, pushed the AO and Synthes to devise a new operating model.

In 2006, the AO sold and transferred the Synthes brand, all its patents to the AO Instrumentarium, and all rights to the products usages to the producer Synthes, for a one-off payment of 1 billion Swiss Francs. Additionally the manufacturer would pay a fixed yearly fee of 50.7 million Swiss Francs, and the AO would in exchange organize a number of educational courses, during which only AO Instrumentarium products would be used. With successive adjustments and negotiations, this has been the operating model under which the AO has continued to cooperate, first with Synthes, and later with Depuy Synthes (renamed after the 2011 acquisition by Johnson & Johnson)

== Activities ==
The AO Foundation has several pillars of activity:

- AO Research Institute (ARI)
- AO Education Institute
- AO Innovation Translation Center
- Clinical Divisions and areas

== AO Research Institute (ARI) ==
ARI focuses on pre-clinical research. Scientists working in the AO research facilities located in the Swiss city of Davos conduct fundamental and applied research in the fields of biomechanics and biology of bone, disc and cartilage (including tissue engineering and musculoskeletal infections), and biomaterials science (such as degradable polymers and polymer-based transport systems). The institute also conducts research in the field of new surgical techniques, tools, and devices, such as "smart" implants, and intracorporeal navigation and tools for surgical teams and surgeons.

The institute, led by Geoff Richards since 1991, employs over 100 scientist and PhD students from all over the world, and is considered the largest institute of its kind. It is partially funded by the AO Foundation as well as external grants.

== AO Education Institute ==
The AO Education Institute is responsible for the development of each educational product curriculum as well as creating educational tools and media. It is also in charge of AO faculty development, evaluating and assessing educational outcomes, and designing and performing medical education research.

== AO Innovation Translation Center ==
This division includes the AO Technical Commission, which develops and tests new devices, which will eventually find their way to the market. Other key areas within the Innovation Translation Center include Technology Transfer, which offers seed funding for innovation in the field of surgeon education or other areas of a muskuloeskeletal disorder patient's treatment journey, a development incubator department, and the Clinical Operations and the Clinical Science departments, which focus on clinical research, from management and research execution through outcomes publication.

== Clinical Divisions and areas ==
The different anatomical and pathology areas are covered by different working groups, task forces, and commissions, split into the following 5 clinical specialties

- AO Trauma, which focuses on surgical management of general trauma and disorders of the musculoskeletal system
- AO Spine, with focus on disorders of the spine, including trauma, deformities, degeneration, tumor, and spinal cord injury
- AO CMF, the division specializing in craniomaxillofacial disorders, including bone and soft tissue
- AO Recon, focusing on major joint preservation and replacement, specifically shoulder, hip, and knee
- AO VET, the AO division specializing in muskuloeskeletal disorders in small and large animals

The main operation of daily activities at the AO Foundation lies in the organization and delivery of educational events, comprising symposia, webinars, seminars, and courses aimed at orthopaedic surgeons, neurosurgeons, craniomaxillofacial surgeons, operating room personnel, and other health professionals. These include hands on experience of using the latest implants, as well as lectures from expert surgeons and discussions.

== Global impact of the AO ==
- One of the AO's most important contributions to its field has been popularizing osteosynthesis as a better treatment option over other methods, with its direct impact in patient outcomes.
- The economical, societal and health-economics impact of the AO's advocated methods has been measured by a study from the Zurich University of Applied Sciences (ZHAW)
- The AO's contributions to the field, including but not limited to the current usage of internal fixation implants, surgical techniques, and clinical resources, have a significant impact in the way orthopaedic trauma surgery, spine surgery, craniomaxillofacial surgery, and joint preservation and replacement surgery are performed. The AO injury classifications and fracture classifications are standard clinical tools around the world, widely used and cited in academic publications.

== Recent events ==
- In March 2018, it was announced that the AO Foundation has partnered with OBERD, a leader in outcomes data collection to provide an innovative patient outcomes data collection system for its members in the United States.
- In March 2020, The AO Foundation announced an agreement with icotec ag for the joint development of a new spinal stabilization system based on the latter's proprietary BlackArmor Carbon/PEEK composite implant material.
- The AO and Rimasys entered a strategic partnership to feature Rimasys' 3D virtual platforms and AI-powered tools in AO's educational events.

== See also ==
- Orthognathic surgery
- Müller AO Classification of fractures
