= Jeff Richards =

Jeff(rey) Richards may refer to:

- Jeff Richards (actor, born 1924), baseball player and actor
- Jeff Richards (actor, born 1974), cast member of Saturday Night Live and MADtv
- Jeff Richards (defensive back) (born 1991), American football cornerback
- Jeff Richards (American football coach), American college football coach
- Jeffrey Richards (born 1945), professor of cultural history
- Jeffrey Richards (producer) (born 1950) American theatrical producer.
- Jeff Richards (Neighbours), fictional character on the Australian soap opera Neighbours

== See also ==
- Geoff Richards (disambiguation)
