= Canada Games Centre =

Sports centre in Halifax, Nova Scotia

Coordinates: 44.6595°N 63.6645°W

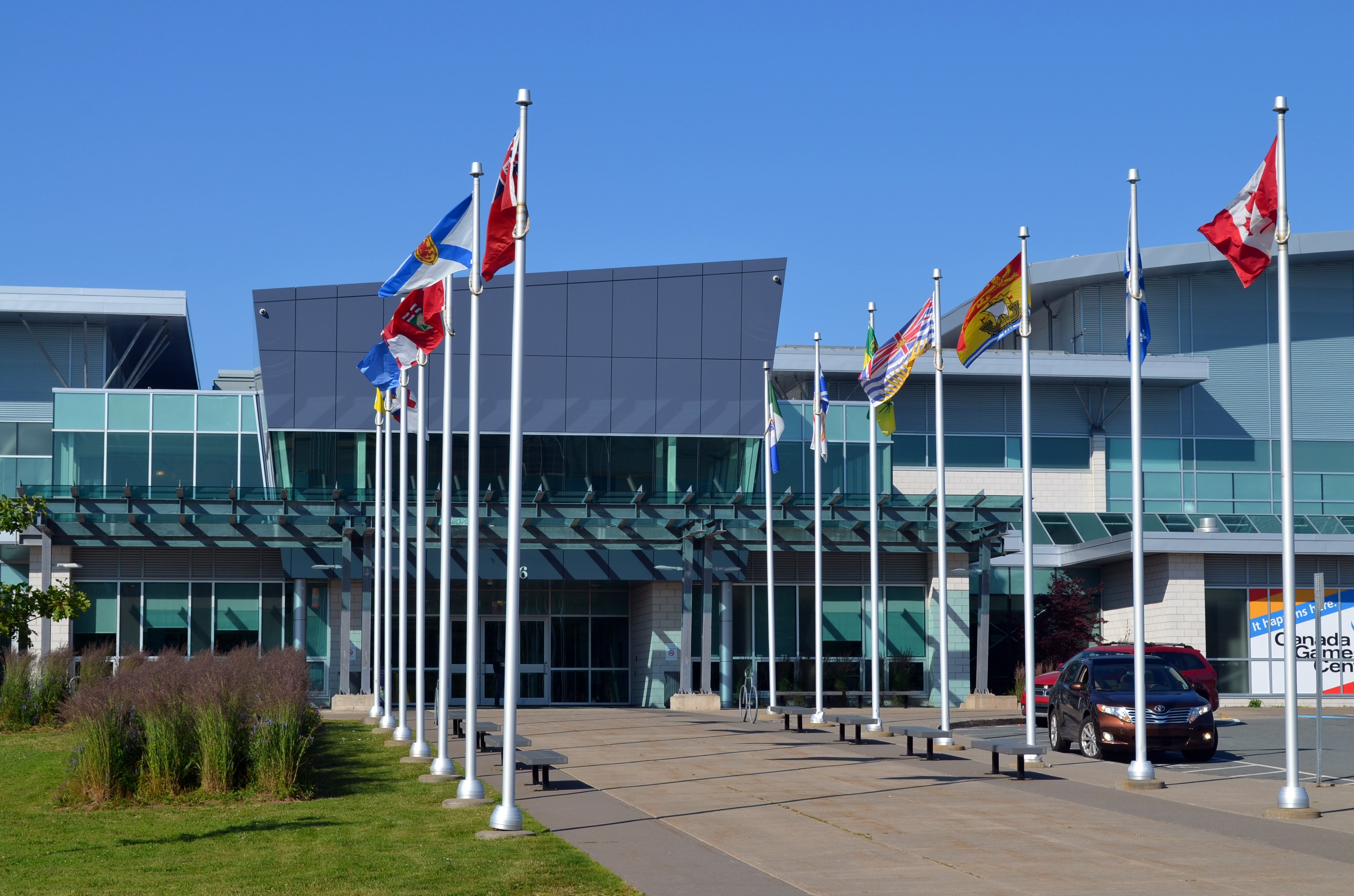
- Main entrance
- Interactive map of the Canada Games Centre area

General information
- Opened: January 2011
- Cost: $45 million

Technical details
- Floor area: 176,000 square feet (16,400 m^{2})

Website
- canadagamescentre.ca

The Canada Games Centre was built for the 2011 Canada Winter Games in Clayton Park, a suburb of Halifax, Nova Scotia. It was the venue for the artistic gymnastics, badminton, and synchronized swimming competitions. It is now used as a fitness, swimming, track, basketball, and yoga recreation facility.

== History ==
The Canada Games Centre replaced the nearby Northcliffe swimming pool and community centre, which was aging and offered fewer facilities, but garnered criticism that the higher membership fees priced some community members out, many seniors in particular.

The complex cost about C$45 million and was designed by DSRA Architecture of Halifax. It opened in January 2011.

In 2026, Manulife, an insurance company, bought naming rights to the Canada Games Centre for a 10-year period. As a result, there is a plan to rename the building as "Manulife Recreation Centre".

== Design and facilities ==
The Manulife Recreation Centre has a floor area of approximately 176,000 square feet (16,400 m^{2}). It contains a field house, running track, 25-metre pool, leisure pool, a fitness centre, multi-purpose rooms, cafes, and social spaces.

The building is LEED Silver certified for its sustainable and resource-efficient features. The Canada Games Centre is located next to the newly built Lacewood Bus Terminal (08/2017), which provides transit service throughout the Halifax Regional Municipality.
