= Shooting at the 2011 Canada Winter Games =

Shooting at the 2011 Canada Winter Games was held at Sackville High School in Lower Sackville, Nova Scotia.

The events were held during the first week between February 14 and 17, 2011.

== Men's events ==
Event	Gold		Silver		Bronze	
Air Rifle	Mack Kohl; Saskatchewan	581.0	Chris Baldwin; Ontario	577.0	Ben Taylor; Newfoundland and Labrador	573.0
Air Rifle Pairs	Kyle Jackson; Chris Baldwin; Ontario	1,130.0	Mack Kohl; Clayton Schlosser; Saskatchewan	1,130.0	Ben Taylor; Jason Harnum; Newfoundland and Labrador	1,128.0
Air Pistol	Francis Le Sieur; Quebec	646.7	Jordan Akow; Ontario	643.4	Peter Schulze; Alberta	642.0
Air Pistol Pairs	Jordan Akow; Matthew Kao; Ontario	1,073.0	Francis Le Sieur; Sébastien Arsenault; Quebec	1,073.0	Peter Schulze; Kendyll McIlroy; Alberta	1,056.0

== Women's events ==
Event	Gold		Silver		Bronze	
Air Rifle	Connor Deneka; Manitoba	385.0	Ashley Knockwood; New Brunswick	384.0	Cassandra Wilson-Anderson; Saskatchewan	383.0
Air Rifle Pairs	Cassandra Wilson-Anderson; Aerial Arthur; Saskatchewan	788.0	Audrey-Anne Déry; Rosemarie Rajotte; Quebec	759.0	Connor Deneka; Heather McCrea; Manitoba	757.0
Air Pistol	Danielle Marcotte; Yukon	466.2	Emma Meulenkamp; Newfoundland and Labrador	459.0	Caroline Sims; Manitoba	455.6
Air Pistol Pairs	Danielle Marcotte; Kyley Marcotte; Yukon	710.0	Kathleen Auton; Erin Beckett; British Columbia	710.0	Caroline Sims; Tanis Milne; Manitoba	695.0
