= Cross-country skiing at the 2011 Canada Winter Games =

Cross-country skiing at the 2011 Canada Winter Games was at Ski Martock near Windsor, Nova Scotia. It was held from the 21 to 26 February. There were 20 events of cross country skiing.

== Medal table ==
The following is the medal table for alpine skiing at the 2011 Canada Winter Games.

* Host nation (Nova Scotia)

Rank	Nation	Gold	Silver	Bronze	Total
1	Quebec	5	4	2	11
2	Ontario	4	6	1	11
3	Alberta	4	2	5	11
4	British Columbia	3	6	5	14
5	Manitoba	3	0	0	3
6	Yukon	1	1	1	3
7	New Brunswick	0	1	0	1
8	Saskatchewan	0	0	2	2
9	Newfoundland and Labrador	0	0	1	1
10	Nova Scotia*	0	0	0	0
Totals (10 entries)		20	20	17	57

== Men's events ==
Event	Gold		Silver		Bronze	
10 km free (interval start)	Kevin Sandau; Alberta	22:09.40	Michael Somppi; Ontario	22:11:30	Jesse Cockney; Alberta	22:13.60
15 km classic (mass start)	Jesse Cockney; Alberta	37:03.30	Graeme Killick; Alberta	37:03.60	Kevin Sandau; Alberta	37:04.60
1,000 m sprint	Jesse Cockney; Alberta	1.00	Andy Shields; Ontario	2.00	Graeme Killick; Alberta	3.00
Relay 4 x 5 km	Alberta; Jessey Cockney, Gerard Garnier, Graeme Killick, Kevin Sandau, and Kurtis Wenzel	37:03.30	Quebec; Raphaël Couturier, Steffan Lloyd, Étienne Richard, Patrick Stewart-Jones, and Alexis Turgeon	37:03.60	British Columbia; Joey Burton, Colin Ferrie, Matt Neumann, Geoffrey Richards, and Matt Wylie	37:04.60

=== Men's para events ===
Event	Gold		Silver		Bronze	
2.5 km sit-ski	Sébastien Fortier; Quebec	6:20.10	Lou Gibson; British Columbia	6:36.10	Yves Bourque; Quebec	6:53.10
5 km sit-ski	Sébastien Fortier; Quebec	15:40.40	Lou Gibson; British Columbia	16:29.90	Yves Bourque; Quebec	16:42.50
800 m sit-ski sprint	Sébastien Fortier; Quebec	2:08.21	Yves Bourque; Quebec	2:12.69	Lou Gibson; British Columbia	2:19.06
2.5 km standing free (interval start)	Slade Doyle; Manitoba	6:20.40	Louis Fortin; New Brunswick	7:46.40	not awarded	
5 km standing classic	Slade Doyle; Manitoba	20:59.90	Gabriel Denis; Ontario	21:24.00	not awarded	
1000 m standing sprint	Slade Doyle; Manitoba	2:51.95	Gabriel Denis; Ontario	3:58.54	not awarded	

== Women's events ==
Event	Gold		Silver		Bronze	
7.5 km free (interval start)	Emily Nishikawa; Yukon	19:37.60	Alysson Marshall; British Columbia	19.53.10	Heidi Widmer; Alberta	20.13.40
10 km classic (mass start)	Alysson Marshall; British Columbia	29:32.30	Emily Nishikawa; Yukon	29:34.60	Andrea Lee; British Columbia	29:35.40
1,000 m sprint	Alysson Marshall; British Columbia	1.00	Heidi Widmer; Alberta	2.00	Emily Nishikawa; Yukon	3.00
Relay 4 x 3.75 km	British Columbia; Kajsa Heyes, Andrea Lee, Alysson Marshall, Heather Mehain, and Rebecca Reid	43:51.00	Quebec; Cathou Auclair, Olivia Bouffard-Nesbitt, Anne-Marie Comeau, Camille Pepin, and Michelle Workun-Hill	44:27.60	Alberta; Sara Hewitt, Annika Hicks, Marlis Kromm, Maya MacIsaac-Jones, and Heidi Widmer	44:30.70

=== Women's para events ===
Event	Gold		Silver		Bronze	
2.5 km sit-ski	Christy Campbell; Ontario	9:34.30	Christine Gauthier; Quebec	9:46.00	Tanya Quesnel; Ontario	12:51.20
5 km sit-ski	Christine Gauthier; Quebec	22:17.10	Christy Campbell; Ontario	24:03.00	Kelsi Paul; Saskatchewan	26:29.60
800 m sit-ski sprint	Christine Gauthier; Quebec	3:11.91	Christy Campbell; Ontario	3:15.07	Kelsi Paul; Saskatchewan	3:40.85
2.5 km standing free (interval start)	Margarita Gorbounova; Ontario	7:58.60	Courtney Knight; British Columbia	8:48.30	Erica Noonan; Newfoundland and Labrador	9:17.20
5 km standing classic	Margarita Gorbounova; Ontario	22:49.10	Mary Benson; British Columbia	23:00.50	Courtney Knight; British Columbia	24:16.30
1000 m standing sprint	Margarita Gorbounova; Ontario	3:49.61	Courtney Knight; British Columbia	4:05.66	Mary Benson; British Columbia	4:10.78
