= Artistic gymnastics at the 2011 Canada Winter Games =

Artistic gymnastics at the 2011 Canada Winter Games was held at the newly built Canada Games Centre in Halifax

The events were held during the first week between February 13 and 17, 2011.

== Medal table ==
The following is the medal table for artistic gymnastics at the 2011 Canada Winter Games.

* Host nation (Nova Scotia)

Rank	Nation	Gold	Silver	Bronze	Total
1	Ontario	7	3	6	16
2	Quebec	4	2	3	9
3	British Columbia	3	6	5	14
4	Nova Scotia*	1	0	1	2
4	Saskatchewan	1	0	1	2
6	Alberta	1	0	0	1
Totals (6 entries)		17	11	16	44

=== Men's Events ===
Event	Gold		Silver		Bronze	
Team all-around	Quebec	304.600	British Columbia	304.000	Ontario	303.150
Individual all-around	Simon Porter; Ontario	79.350	Kal Nemier; British Columbia	77.200	Mathieu Csukassy; Quebec	76.950
Floor	Jared Goad; Nova Scotia	13.600	Kal Nemier; British Columbia	13.400	Mathieu Csukassy; Quebec	13.350
Pommel horse	Bobby Kriangkum; Alberta; Zach Clay; British Columbia	13.150	Not awarded		Simon Porter; Ontario	12.950
Rings	Simon Porter; Ontario	13.800	Matthew Halickman; Quebec	13.350	Curtis Graves; Saskatchewan; Kal Nemier; British Columbia	13.150
Vault	Mathieu Csukassy; Quebec	15.700	Zach Clay; British Columbia	14.900	Kal Nemier; British Columbia	14.700
Parallel bars	Curtis Graves; Saskatchewan	12.950	Nicholas Mallia; Ontario	12.700	Stephen Clouter; Nova Scotia	12.500
Horizontal bar	Mathieu Csukassy; Quebec; Matthew Halickman; Quebec	12.500	Not awarded		Simon Porter; Ontario	12.400

=== Women's Events ===
Event	Gold		Silver		Bronze	
Team all-around	Ontario	219.900	British Columbia	214.700	Quebec	210.650
Individual all-around	Silvia Colussi-Pelaez; Ontario; Sabrina Gill; Ontario	55.100	Not awarded		Mikaela Gerber; Ontario	54.850
Vault	Briannah Tsang; British Columbia	14.450	Mikaela Gerber; Ontario	13.900	Emma Kate Sibson; British Columbia	13.850
Floor	Shallon Olsen; British Columbia	14.660	Mikaela Gerber; Ontario	14.450	Briannah Tsang; British Columbia	14.200
Uneven bars	Sabrina Gill; Ontario	14.350	Shae Zamardi; British Columbia	13.850	Silvia Colussi-Pelaez; Ontario	13.650
Balance beam	Sabrina Gill; Ontario	14.850	Vivi Babalis; Quebec	14.750	Shallon Olsen; British Columbia; Mikaela Gerber; Ontario	13.900
