= Boxing at the 2011 Canada Winter Games =

Boxing at the 2011 Canada Winter Games was held at the Halifax Forum in Halifax, Nova Scotia.

The events will be held during the second week between February 21 and 21, 2011. Boxing events were scheduled for just men.

In weight categories with less than 8 competitors, only one bronze medal was awarded. For the 91 kg category no bronze medal was awarded as only 5 athletes took part.

== Medal table ==
The following is the medal table for alpine skiing at the 2011 Canada Winter Games.

* Host nation (Nova Scotia)

Rank	Nation	Gold	Silver	Bronze	Total
1	Ontario	3	3	2	8
2	Nova Scotia*	2	2	0	4
3	Quebec	1	2	3	6
4	Prince Edward Island	1	0	2	3
5	Saskatchewan	1	0	1	2
6	British Columbia	1	0	0	1
7	Manitoba	0	1	3	4
8	Alberta	0	1	0	1
9	New Brunswick	0	0	1	1
Totals (9 entries)		9	9	12	30

== Medalists ==
Event	Gold	Silver	Bronze
49 kg	Brody Pigeon; Saskatchewan	Evan Gillard; Ontario	Oktay Kazimoglu; Quebec
52 kg	Jason Downey; Nova Scotia	Julio Escorcia Jr. Manitoba	Bradley Wilcox; Ontario
56 kg	Jessy Brown; British Columbia	Pascal Dion; Quebec	Rodolfo Velasquez; Ontario
60 kg	David Théroux; Quebec	Azeem Khan; Ontario	Brandon Blacquiere; Prince Edward Island
60 kg	David Théroux; Quebec	Azeem Khan; Ontario	Sean Mcintosh; Saskatchewan
64 kg	Zsolt Daranyi; Ontario	Taylor Gordon; Nova Scotia	Tony Doiron; New Brunswick
64 kg	Zsolt Daranyi; Ontario	Taylor Gordon; Nova Scotia	Jordan Goulet; Quebec
69 kg	Luis Valdivia; Ontario	Cyrus Taylor; Nova Scotia	Luke Holland; Prince Edward Island
69 kg	Luis Valdivia; Ontario	Cyrus Taylor; Nova Scotia	Josué St-Cyr; Quebec
75 kg	Cody Crowley; Ontario	Veton Arifi; Quebec	Jerome Busch; Manitoba
81 kg	Robert MacMillan; Prince Edward Island	Kingsley Alexander; Ontario	Kurtis Brownrigg; Manitoba
91 kg	Matthew Whitford; Nova Scotia	Brandon Cardinal; Alberta	Taylor Gillespie; Manitoba
