= Halifax Forum =

Arena and multi-purpose facility in Halifax, Nova Scotia

Coordinates: 44°39′19″N 63°36′15.1″W

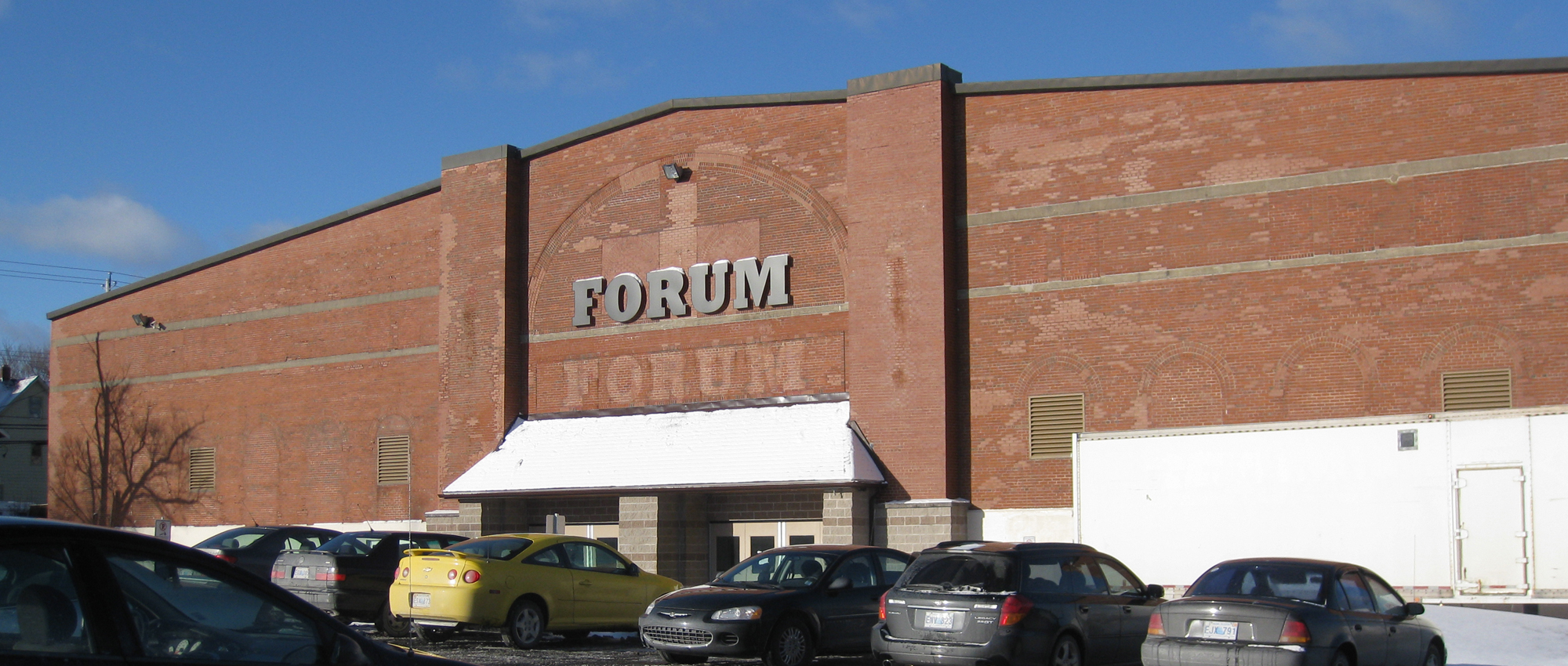
- Interactive map of Halifax Forum
- Location: 2901 Windsor Street, Halifax, Nova Scotia, Canada
- Capacity: Hockey: 6,300 Concerts: 7,300

Construction
- Opened: December 21, 1927

Tenants
- Nova Scotia Voyageurs (AHL) (1971–1978); Halifax Mooseheads (Pre-season) (QMJHL); Dalhousie Tigers (AUS); Saint Mary's Huskies (AUS) (2000-2019)

The Halifax Forum is an arena and multi-purpose facility in Halifax, Nova Scotia. Its uses include sporting events, bingo, ice skating, concerts and markets. It was built in 1927 on the site of the former Nova Scotia Provincial Exhibition which was badly damaged by the Halifax explosion in 1917. It opened on 26 December 1927 and incorporated the first artificial ice surface east of Montreal. It is the second biggest arena in Nova Scotia, and the fifth biggest in Atlantic Canada. The building was added to the Canadian Register of Historic Places in 2003.

== Sports ==
It is the former home of the Nova Scotia Voyageurs of the American Hockey League. The Voyageurs won the Calder Cup three times at the forum: 1971-72, 1975-76, and 1976-77. The Voyageurs moved to the new Halifax Metro Centre (now the Scotiabank Centre) in 1979. Other former tenants include the Halifax Junior Canadians, Halifax Wolverines (senior team), and the AUS St. Mary's Huskies. The arena now hosts Dalhousie Tigers hockey, Halifax Macs of the Nova Scotia U18 Major Hockey League and the QMJHL's Mooseheads preseason games.

It is also home to basketball, boxing and curling. The arena's capacity for hockey is 5,796 and about 6,300 with standing room. The arena's capacity for basketball is 6,800. The forum's capacity for concerts is 7,300. The largest audience for an event held at the Forum was reportedly close to 8,600 people, at the first live World Wrestling Federation show in Halifax, on July 18, 1987, which featured a main event match between then-WWF champion Hulk Hogan and Randy "Macho Man" Savage. During the 2011 Canada Games, the Forum hosted the boxing competitions.

== Concert and event venue ==
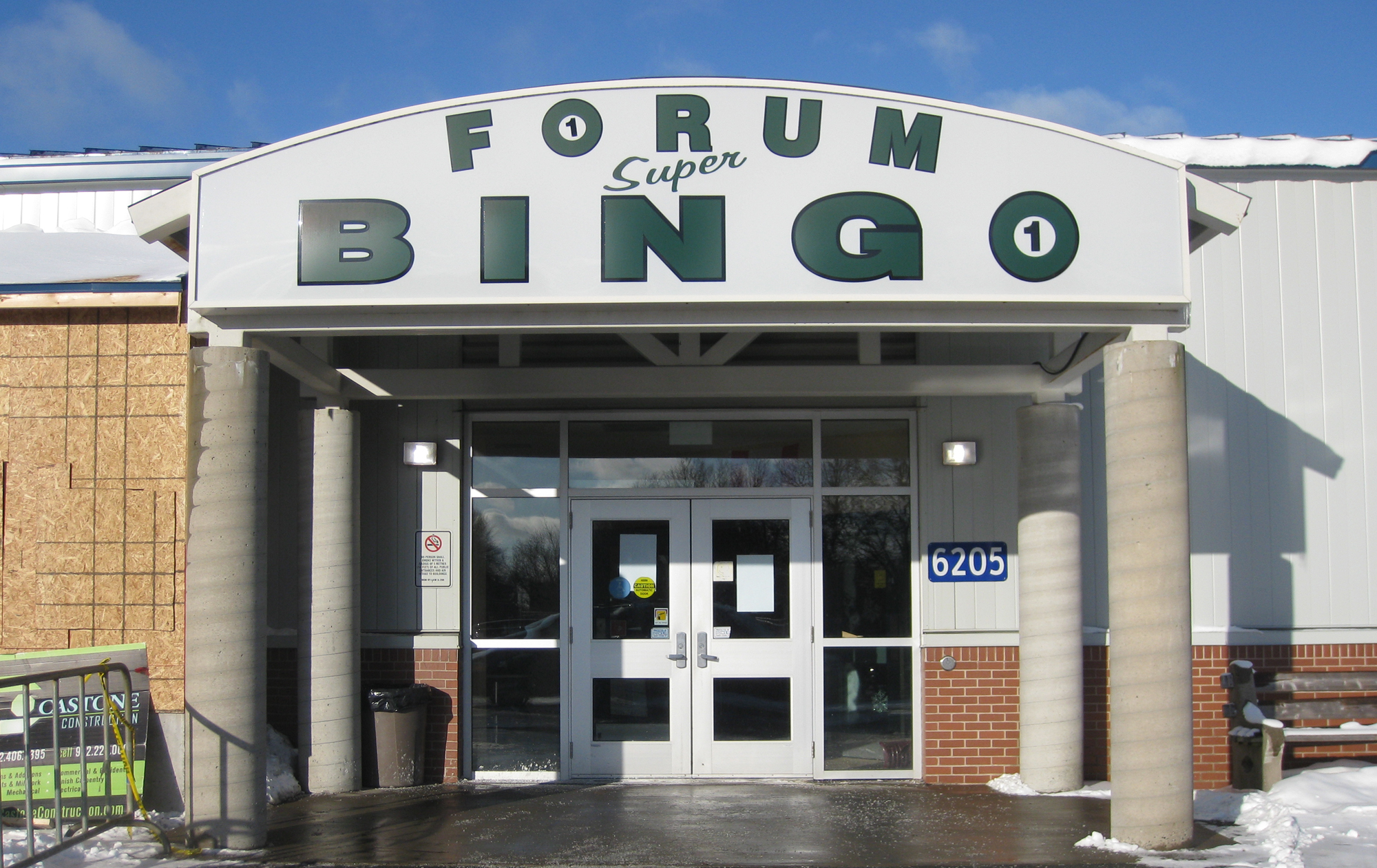
Halifax Forum Bingo Hall

The hall also hosts trade shows and concerts. In 2018 the venue hosted two nights of John Mellencamp's Sad Clowns & Hillbillies tour.

== Nova Scotia Voyageurs ==
The Nova Scotia Voyageurs were a professional ice hockey team, based in Halifax, Nova Scotia, Canada. They played in the American Hockey League, from 1971 to 1984. Originally chartered as the Houston Apollos of the Central Hockey League, the organization was relocated to Montreal after five seasons due to low attendance and travel costs. The Voyageurs (or "Vees" for short) played their first two seasons (1969–71), as the Montreal Voyageurs and were the affiliate of the National Hockey League's Montreal Canadiens.

In 1971, they relocated to Halifax, Nova Scotia. They were the first AHL team to be located in Atlantic Canada, and would be the first to play in the Halifax Metro Centre in 1979. The team was also the first Canadian club to win the Calder Cup, and were the class of the league for many years - only in two seasons did the team garner a losing record, and the Voyageurs never missed the playoffs. The team eventually moved to Sherbrooke, Quebec to become the Sherbrooke Canadiens.

The Vees won three Calder Cups, the first in 1972. Nova Scotia won again in 1976 and 1977, while their parent Canadiens were winning back-to-back Stanley Cups; this is the only time an NHL/AHL affiliated combo have won both Cups in the same year twice.

The team was replaced in Halifax by the Nova Scotia Oilers, an affiliate of the Edmonton Oilers and subsequently the Halifax Citadels, an affiliate of the Quebec Nordiques.

With the success of the Voyageurs in its existence of 13 seasons, it spawned a period of 34 consecutive years where there would be at least one AHL team in Atlantic Canada. This was largely due to the desire of several Canadian NHL franchises to continue to pay players sent down to the minors in Canadian dollars throughout the 1980s and 1990s. However, by the late 1990s, many of the remaining AHL teams in Atlantic Canada had disappeared, either by relocation or by the franchise being rendered dormant. The last remaining team in this long period would be the St. John's Maple Leafs, which moved from St. John's, Newfoundland and Labrador in 2005 to Toronto, Ontario to play as the Toronto Marlies. The AHL did not return to Atlantic Canada until 2011 with the St. John's IceCaps.

== Halifax Mooseheads ==
The Halifax Mooseheads are a Canadian major junior ice hockey club in the Quebec Major Junior Hockey League (QMJHL) based in Halifax, Nova Scotia, Canada. The team was founded in 1994 and began play in the Dilio Division of the QMJHL from the 1994–95 season. They have appeared in the President's Cup Finals four times, winning in 2013. The other three appearances were in 2003, 2005 and 2019. They hosted the Memorial Cup tournament in 2000 and 2019 and won the Memorial Cup in 2013. The team plays their home games in the Scotiabank Centre with a capacity of 11,093 seats.

The Mooseheads were the first team from Atlantic Canada to join the QMJHL. With the Mooseheads' success, the QMJHL then expanded to several other east coast cities. The QMJHL's eastward expansion has been credited with elevating the skill level and the career opportunities for hockey talent from the region. In the 2018–19 season, three of the NHL's top seven scorers were QMJHL alumni from Halifax; two of them former Mooseheads.

== Dalhousie Tigers ==
The Dalhousie Tigers are the men's and women's athletic teams that represent Dalhousie University in Halifax, Nova Scotia, Canada. The Tigers field 14 varsity teams with seven men's teams and seven women's teams that primarily compete in the Atlantic University Sport conference of U Sports. The university also offers numerous intramural and club sports that are available to students, staff, alumni, and Dalpex members.

== Saint Mary's Huskies ==
The Saint Mary's Huskies are the men's and women's athletic teams that represent Saint Mary's University in Halifax, Nova Scotia, Canada. Their primary home turf is Huskies Stadium located in the centre of the University's campus.

In September 2007, Saint Mary's announced the plans to build the new Homburg Centre for Health & Wellness that will comprise the current gymnasium (The Tower), the new Dauphinee Arena, and a new building to connect the two. The centre is to be named after Dr. Richard Homburg, who provided a $5 million gift to the project, the largest gift the university had received in its 205-year history. The Dauphinee Arena, completed in 2019, has an NHL-sized ice surface and a capacity for 1200. Before they had play at the Halifax forum. The arena is named for the late Mr. Bob Dauphinee who was a strong supporter of the Huskies hockey team for over 50 years. Upon his death in 2001, Mr. Dauphinee had left an estate gift to the university of $2.1 million.
