= Cobequid Pass =

Pass in Nova Scotia

Coordinates: 45°25′56.21″N 63°34′38.9″W

Cobequid Pass

Route information
- Maintained by Department of Transportation and Infrastructure Renewal
- Length: 45 km (28 mi)
- Existed: November 15, 1997–present

Major junctions
- West end: Hwy 104 (TCH) / Trunk 4 near Thomson Station
- East end: Hwy 104 (TCH) / Trunk 4 near Masstown

Location
- Country: Canada
- Province: Nova Scotia

Highway system
- Provincial highways in Nova Scotia; 100-series

The Cobequid Pass is the name given to a 45 km (28 mi) section of Nova Scotia Highway 104 (the Trans-Canada Highway) between Thomson Station, Cumberland County and Masstown, Colchester County in the Canadian province of Nova Scotia, with a 24 km (15 mi) tolled portion. The section is a public–private partnership; the highway is owned by the Highway 104 Western Alignment Corporation, a Crown corporation of the Government of Nova Scotia, with a toll plaza operated under contract by Atlantic Highway Management Corporation Limited, a subsidiary of Aecon Concessions. The toll plaza is located near the halfway point in Londonderry. It opened in 1997.

== Tolls ==
Commercial and personal vehicles registered in Nova Scotia have been exempted from Cobequid Pass tolls since December 21, 2021. Eligible Nova Scotian vehicles must either register for a free transponder or present proof of provincial vehicle registration at the toll booth.

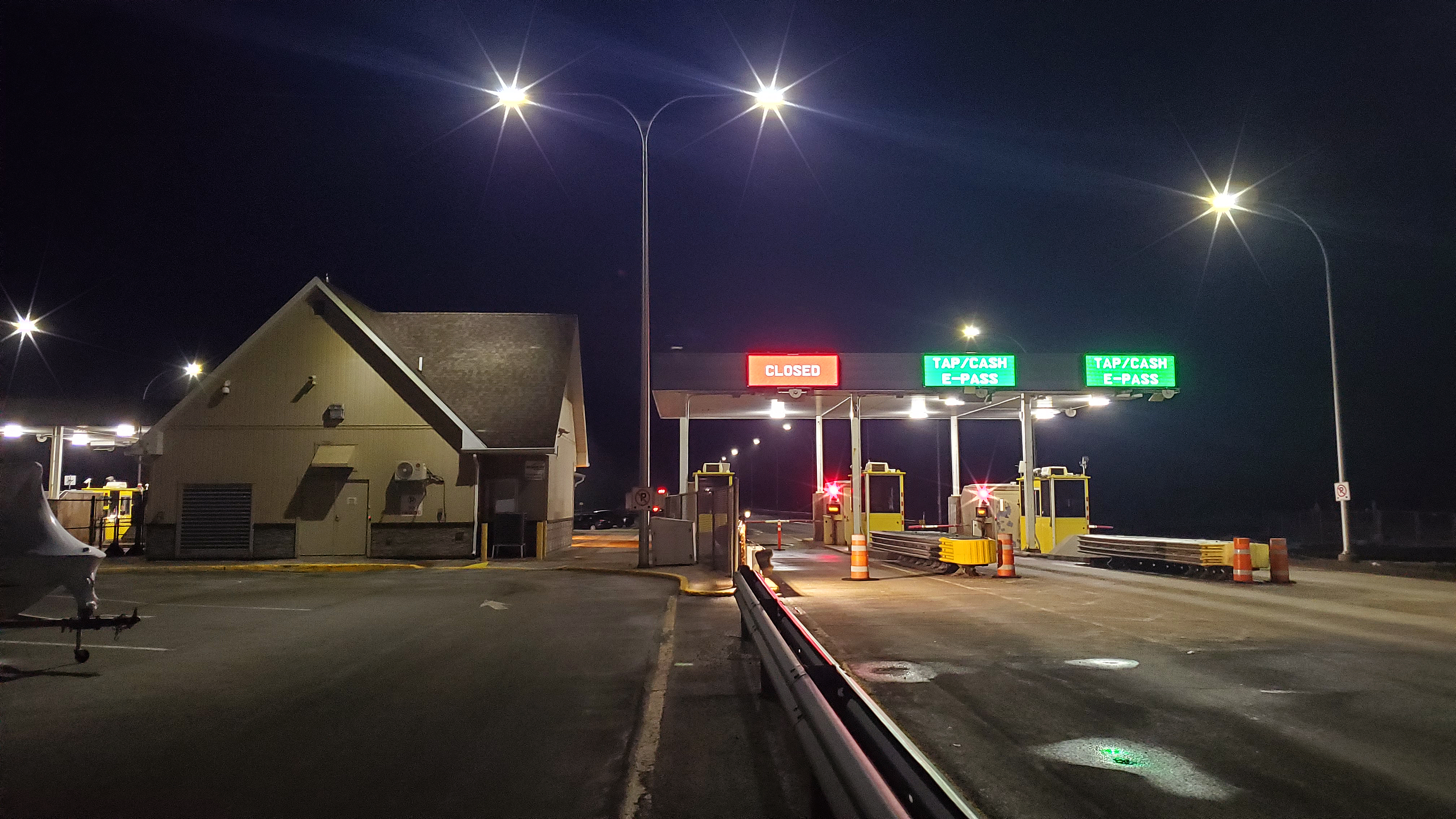
Cobequid Pass toll booth, eastbound

Tolls continue to be charged for out-of-province vehicles: $4 for personal vehicles and $3 per axle for commercial vehicles. According to the Nova Scotia Department of Public Works about 50 per cent of passenger vehicles and about 70 per cent of commercial trucks using the Cobequid Pass were registered out-of-province, as of December 2021.

Tolls are collected via both electronic toll collection as well as cash paid to toll booth operators. Toll collection operations are run by Atlantic Highway Management Corporation Limited (AHMCL), which is a subsidiary of the contractor, Atlantic Highways Corporation (AHC). Both are now owned by Aecon. AHC guaranteed the highway for three years, which was an unprecedented warranty period at that time, and all deficiencies were repaired at their expense. Maintenance has been performed by the Department of Transportation & Infrastructure Renewal since the expiration of that warranty in 2000.

As part of non-tariff retaliatory measures to response to general American tariffs on Canadian goods in the 2025 United States trade war with Canada and Mexico, Premier Tim Houston ordered the immediate doubling of tolls for American commercial vehicles.

Despite being collectively considered a tolled portion of Highway 104, the Cobequid Pass is not entirely tolled, as there are three interchanges (Exits 8, 10, and 11) before the toll plaza between the section's endpoints at Trunk 4 (Exits 7 and 12, with 11 also being with Trunk 4), and no tolls are charged to reach them from either Trunk 4 interchange. However, as the stretch of Trunk 4 between the ends of the Cobequid Pass is commonly used by motorists to avoid the toll, these exits are ignored and there are signs before the Trunk 4 offramps at Exits 7 and 12 approaching it stating the tolled section officially begins.

== Name ==
The Cobequid Pass received its name from a combination of the Cobequid Mountains (which the highway crosses over) and the word "bypass". There is no geographic feature in Nova Scotia, such as an actual mountain pass in the Cobequid Mountains, having the name "Cobequid Pass".

== History ==
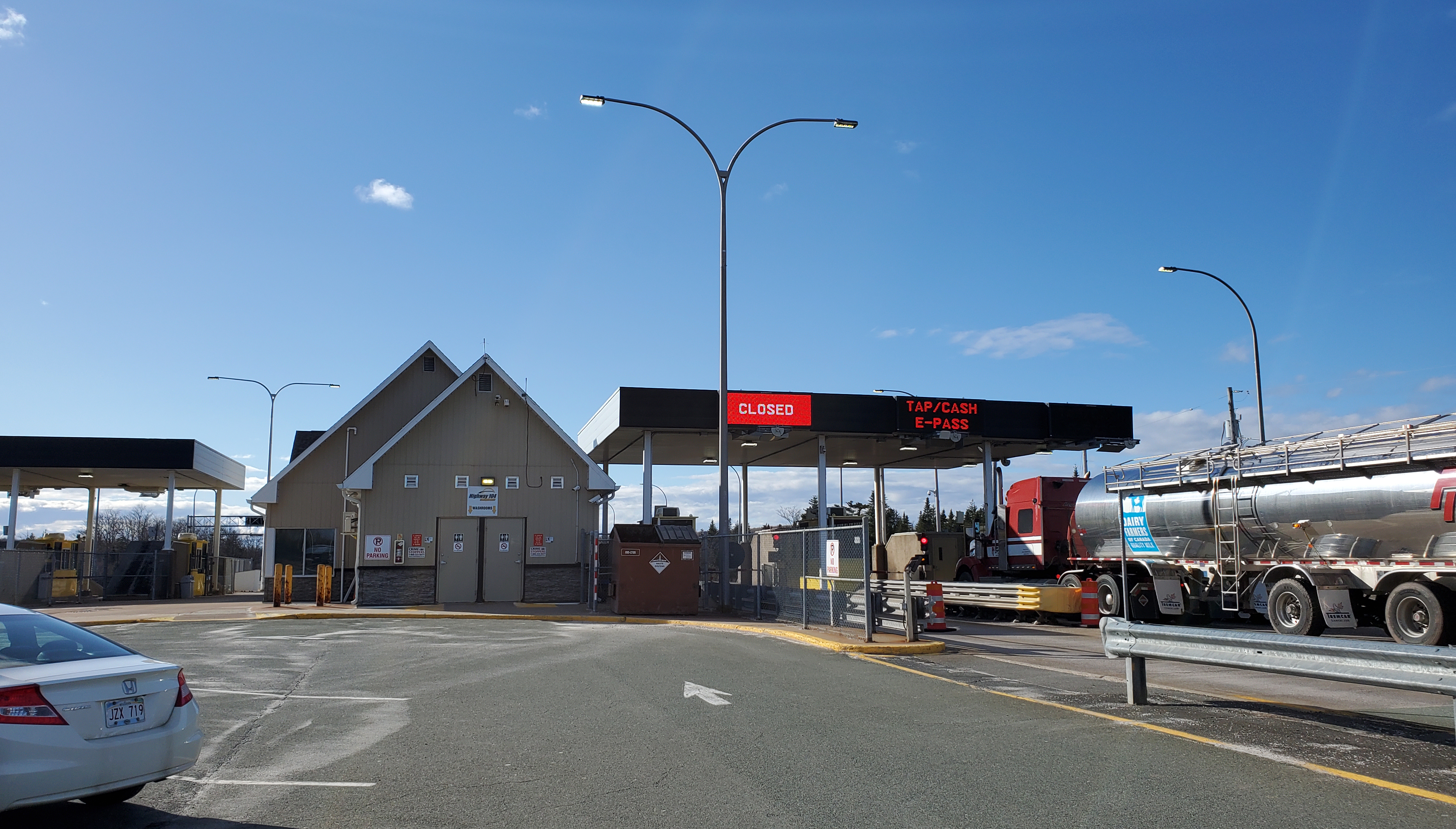
View of the Cobequid Pass rest area as a westbound milk car approaches the toll booth

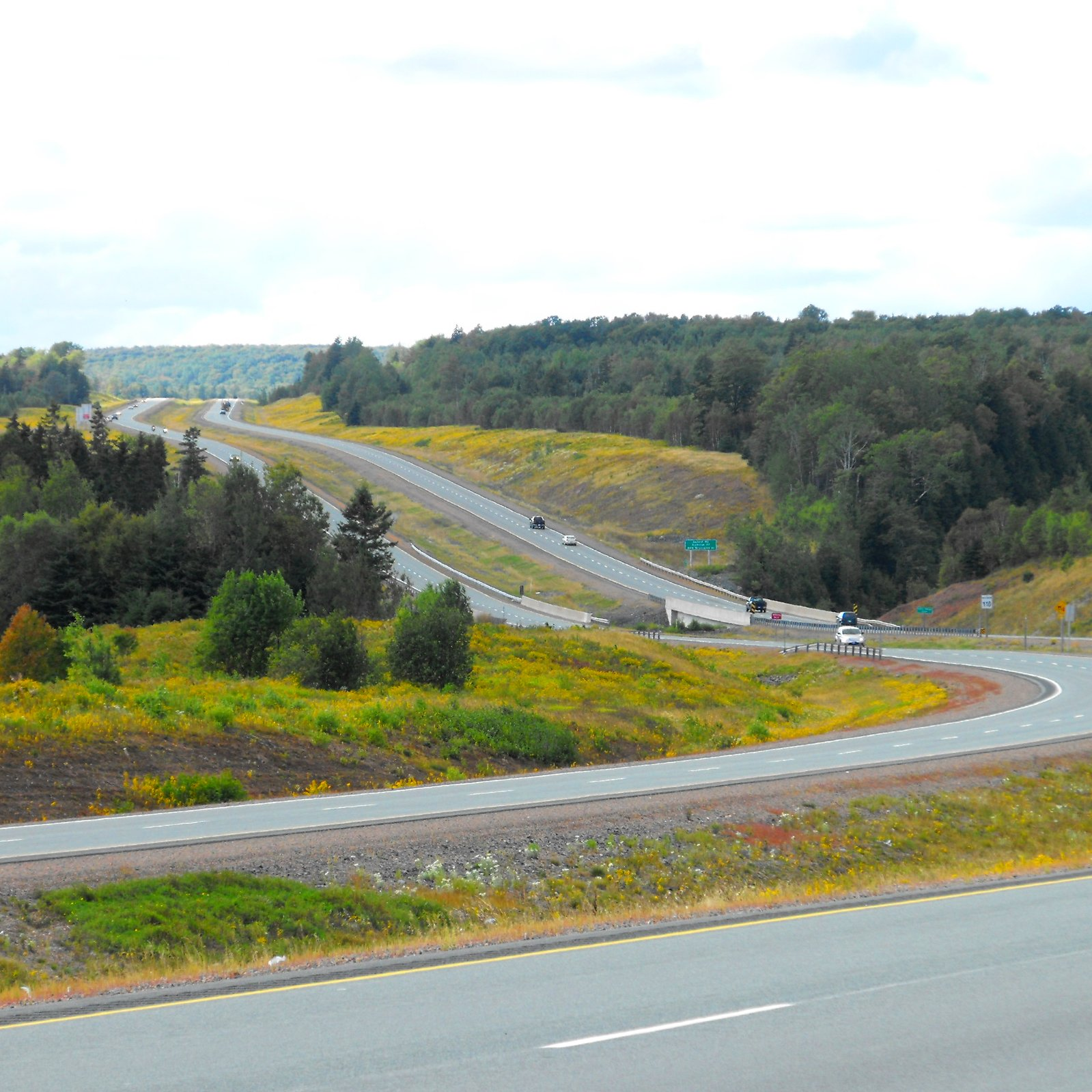
View of Cobequid Pass taken from km 83 facing west toward the crossing over the Great Village River at Lornevale

This section of highway opened as a 4-lane divided freeway on 15 November 1997,

with the prior alignment of Highway 104 between Thomson Station and Masstown being re-designated as part of Nova Scotia Trunk 4. It has a posted speed limit of 110 kilometres per hour (68 mph) throughout, except for a posted speed limit of 50 kilometres per hour (31 mph) for a 1 km (0.62 mi) section at the toll plaza.

The Highway 104 Western Alignment Corporation was created by a provincial statute, the Highway 104 Western Alignment Act, whose sole purpose was to finance, design, construct, operate and maintain this new alignment of highway. The Cobequid Pass Toll Highway was built with CAD $66 million in private financing (from CIT Financial) and CAD $27.5 million from the Government of Nova Scotia and CAD $27.5 million from the Government of Canada. The private financing loan is being paid back through tolls collected at a toll booth located between KM 72 and 73 in Londonderry, Colchester County.

In 2019, an average of 7,600 cars and 2,100 trucks were passing through the Cobequid Pass every day.

=== 1994-1995 funding controversy ===
Prior to this new alignment, Highway 104 ran east and south from Thomson Station for 53 kilometres (33 mi) to Masstown on the present alignment of Trunk 4 through the Wentworth Valley and over Folly Mountain. This 2-lane uncontrolled access section included climbing Folly Mountain and was nicknamed "The Valley of Death" due to an increasing number of accidents with a high fatality rate that were occurring in the early to mid 1990s; it was political pressure resulting from these accidents that forced the cash-strapped provincial government to pursue toll financing for the realignment section now known as the Cobequid Pass Toll Highway.

Beginning in the fall of 1994 and continuing into 1995, national and local media began reporting on a controversy involving the $27.5 million funding for this project from the Government of Canada. It was revealed that the federal Minister of Public Works, David Dingwall, had attempted to redirect approximately $26 million of highway funding designated for Nova Scotia from the proposed bypass of the Wentworth Valley toward upgrading sections of the Fleur-de-lis Trail, a scenic highway that ran through Mr. Dingwall's federal riding of Cape Breton—East Richmond, as well as that of provincial Minister of Transportation and Public Works, Richard Mann's riding of Richmond. The controversy was capitalized by the Reform Party of Canada which erected a large sign beside the highway at Glenholme which read:

Mr. Dingwall

$26-Million is Highway Robbery

Give It Back To Highway 104

Reform Party of Canada

— Sign as quoted by Jeffrey Simpson on 21 June 1995, In Nova Scotia at least, all roads lead to cork barrels, The Globe and Mail
