= Figure skating at the 2011 Canada Winter Games =

Figure skating at the 2011 Canada Winter Games was held at the St. Margaret's Center in Upper Tantallon, Nova Scotia.

The events will be held during the second week between February 21 and 24, 2011.

== Medal table ==
The following is the medal table for alpine skiing at the 2011 Canada Winter Games.

* Host nation ( Nova Scotia)

| Rank | Nation | Gold | Silver | Bronze | Total |
|---|---|---|---|---|---|
| 1 | Ontario | 6 | 3 | 0 | 9 |
| 2 | British Columbia | 3 | 3 | 3 | 9 |
| 3 | Quebec | 3 | 1 | 2 | 6 |
| 4 | Prince Edward Island | 1 | 0 | 0 | 1 |
| 5 | Alberta | 0 | 3 | 2 | 5 |
| 6 | Manitoba | 0 | 1 | 0 | 1 |
| 6 | Nova Scotia* | 0 | 1 | 0 | 1 |
| 8 | New Brunswick | 0 | 0 | 1 | 1 |
| 8 | Saskatchewan | 0 | 0 | 1 | 1 |
| Totals (9 entries) | | 13 | 12 | 9 | 34 |

== Pre-novice events ==
| Event | Gold | | Silver | | Bronze | |
|---|---|---|---|---|---|---|
| Men's | Adonis Wong; British Columbia | 82.24 | Bennet Toman; Quebec | 79.07 | Casey Wong; Alberta | 69.80 |
| Women's | Lisa Nasu-yu; Ontario | 86.32 | Jayda Jurome; British Columbia | 82.91 | Haley Sales; British Columbia | 81.94 |
| Pairs | Hayleigh Bell and Alistair Sylvester; Ontario | 86.69 | Kendra Digness and Cole VanDerVelden; Alberta | 75.96 | Jess Landry and Seb Arcieri; Quebec | 67.93 |
| Dance pairs | Jessica Jiang and Nikolas Wamsteeker; British Columbia | 69.03 | Samantha Glavine and Jeff Hough; Ontario | 65.19 | Christina Penkov and Chris Mostert; Alberta | 60.22 |

== Novice events ==
| Event | Gold | | Silver | | Bronze | |
|---|---|---|---|---|---|---|
| Men's | Mathieu Nepton; Quebec | 127.86 | Drew Wolfe; Alberta | 113.80 | Mitchell Gordon; British Columbia | 111.03 |
| Women's | Véronik Mallet; Quebec | 94.93 | Brianna Clarkson; Ontario | 94.82 | Kassie Costello; New Brunswick | 93.68 |
| Pairs | Shalena Rau and Phelan Simpson; Ontario | 112.41 | Rebecca Marsh and Chris Blackmore; Alberta | 89.95 | not awarded | |
| Dance pairs | Madeline Edwards and Zhao Kai Pang; British Columbia | 91.21 | Mackenzie Bent and Garrett MacKeen; Ontario | 89.36 | Noa Bruser and Timothy Lum; British Columbia | 87.14 |

== Special Olympic events ==
| Event | Gold | | Silver | | Bronze | |
|---|---|---|---|---|---|---|
| Men's lvl II singles | Thomas Babcock; Ontario | 2.0 | Matthew Lai; British Columbia | 3.5 | not awarded | |
| Men's lvl III singles | Émile Baz; Quebec | 2.5 | Allan Tsang; British Columbia | 2.5 | not awarded | |
| Women's lvl II singles | Megan Morse; Ontario | 2.0 | Madisson Scott; Manitoba | 3.5 | Lindsay Ast; Saskatchewan | 3.5 |
| Women's lvl III singles | Carlea Wilkie-Ellis; Ontario | 1.5 | Tia Dolliver; Nova Scotia | 4.0 | Annie Boulanger; Quebec | 5.0 |
| Women's dance singles | Alyssa Chapman; Prince Edward Island | 2.0 | not awarded | | not awarded | |
| Men's dance singles | Jonathan Edwards; Ontario | 1.0 | not awarded | | not awarded | |
