= Squash at the 2011 Canada Winter Games =

Squash at the 2011 Canada Winter Games was held at the Saint Mary's University in Halifax, Nova Scotia.

The events were held during the first week of the Games, between February 13 and 17, 2011.

== Group A ==
Team	Pts	Pld	W	L	GW	GL
Ontario	8	4	0	16	0	
Quebec	6	3	1	12	4	
Northwest Territories	4	2	2	8	8	
Nova Scotia	2	1	3	3	13	
Prince Edward Island	0	0	4	1	15	
