= Badminton at the 2011 Canada Winter Games =

Badminton at the 2011 Canada Winter Games was at Canada Games Centre in Halifax, NS. It was held from the 21 to 27 February. There were 6 events of badminton.

== Medal table ==
The following is the medal table for badminton at the 2011 Canada Winter Games.

* Host nation ( Nova Scotia)

Rank	Nation	Gold	Silver	Bronze	Total
1	Ontario	3	2	1	6
2	British Columbia	1	2	1	4
3	Alberta	1	1	2	4
3	Quebec	1	1	2	4
5	Nova Scotia*	0	0	0	0
Totals (5 entries)		6	6	6	18

== Men's events ==
Event	Gold	Silver	Bronze
Singles	Alex Pang; Alberta	Martin Giuffre; Alberta	Hao Li; Alberta
Doubles	Philippe Charron and Phillipe Gaumond; Quebec	Nathan Lee and Nyl Yakura; Ontario	Logan Campbell and Darren Hong; Alberta

== Women's events ==
Event	Gold	Silver	Bronze
Singles	Michelle Li; Ontario	Phyllis Chan; British Columbia	Christin Wan-Ting Tsai; British Columbia
Doubles	Alex Bruce and Michelle Li; Ontario	Surabhi Kadam and Tracy Wong; Ontario	Caroline Beauregard and Stéphanie Pakenham; Quebec

== Mixed events ==
Event	Gold	Silver	Bronze
Doubles	Nathan Choi and Christin Wan-Ting Tsai; British Columbia	Philippe Charron and Caroline Beauregard; Quebec	Nyl Yakura and Alex Bruce; Ontario
Team	Ontario	British Columbia	Quebec
