= Paddy McConville =

Irish footballer

Personal information
- Full name: Patrick McConville
- Date of birth: 25 March 1902
- Place of birth: Gilford, Ireland
- Position: Left back

Senior career*
Years	Team	Apps	(Gls)
- Portadown Celtic
–1925	Glenavon		
1925–1932	Lincoln City	138	(0)
1932–19??	Glenavon		
- * Club domestic league appearances and goals

Patrick McConville (25 March 1902 – after 1932) was an Irish professional footballer who made 138 appearances in the Football League playing for Lincoln City. He played as a full back, predominantly as a left back. He also played in Ireland for Portadown Celtic and Glenavon.

== Life and career ==
McConville was born in Gilford, County Down, and played football for Portadown Celtic and Glenavon before moving to England to join Third Division North club Lincoln City in 1925. He spent seven seasons with Lincoln, contributing to their divisional title in 1931–32. He made 145 appearances in senior competition without scoring, before returning to Glenavon in 1932.
