= Foothills Nordic Ski Club =

Skiing and biathlon club in Calgary, Canada

Coordinates: 51.057°N 114.078°W

Foothills Nordic Ski Club is a cross-country skiing and biathlon club located in the Calgary region. It is the largest cross-country skiing and biathlon club in Alberta, and one of the largest clubs in Canada. Training for its athletes goes through summer and winter. Two major training venues for the club are Confederation Park Golf Course, and the Canmore Nordic Centre.
