= Mikaela Gerber =

Canadian artistic gymnast

- Full name: Mikaela Dawn Gerber
- Born: June 13, 1995 (age 31) Cambridge, Ontario

Gymnastics career
- Discipline: Women's artistic gymnastics
- Country represented: Canada
- College team: UCLA Bruins (Class of 2018)
- Club: Oakville Gymnastics
- Head coach: Kelly Manjak
- Assistant coaches: Susan Manjak and Lorne Bobkin
- Music: "The Augurs of Spring" from The Rite of Spring by Igor Stravinsky
Medal record
Pan American Games
Silver medal – second place	2011 Guadalajara	Team
Silver medal – second place	2011 Guadalajara	Floor

Mikaela Gerber (born June 13, 1995) is a Canadian artistic gymnast. She is the younger sister of Aisha Gerber.

== Junior career ==
=== 2009 ===
In June, Gerber competed at the Canadian Championships in Hamilton, Canada. She placed second in the all around final with a score of 53.600 and first in the floor final with a score of 14.200.

=== 2010 ===
In May, Gerber competed at the Canadian Championships in Kamloops, Canada. She placed second in the all around final with a score of 54.550 and second in the balance beam final with a score of 13.350.

== Senior career ==
=== 2011 ===
In October, Gerber competed at the 2011 World Artistic Gymnastics Championships. She helped the Canadian team place eleventh with scores of 13.566 on vault, 13.200 on balance beam, and 13.800 on floor.

Later in October, Gerber competed at the 2011 Pan American Games in Guadalajara, Mexico. She helped the Canadian team win the silver medal in the team event with an individual all around score of 53.150. She placed second in the floor final with a score of 13.775.

=== 2012 ===
In April, Gerber placed seventh in the vault final at the Artistic Gymnastics World Cup in Osijek, Croatia with a score of 13.513.

In May, Gerber competed at the Canadian Championships in Regina, Canada. She placed twelfth in the all around final with a score of 51.250. In event finals, she placed eighth on vault scoring 13.200 and fourth on balance beam scoring 13.500.

At the end of June, Gerber was one of the twelve gymnasts chosen to compete at the Final Olympic Selection meet in Gatineau, Canada. On the first day of competition she placed fifth in the all around with a score of 52.450. She was not chosen to be part of the Olympic team.
