= Folly Lake (Annapolis County) =

Lake in Nova Scotia, Canada

- Location within Nova Scotia
- Location: Annapolis County, Nova Scotia
- Coordinates: 44.7294°N 64.8481°W
- Basin countries: Canada

Folly Lake is a lake of Annapolis County, Nova Scotia, Canada.

== See also ==
- List of lakes in Nova Scotia
