= Jesse Cockney =

Canadian cross-country skier

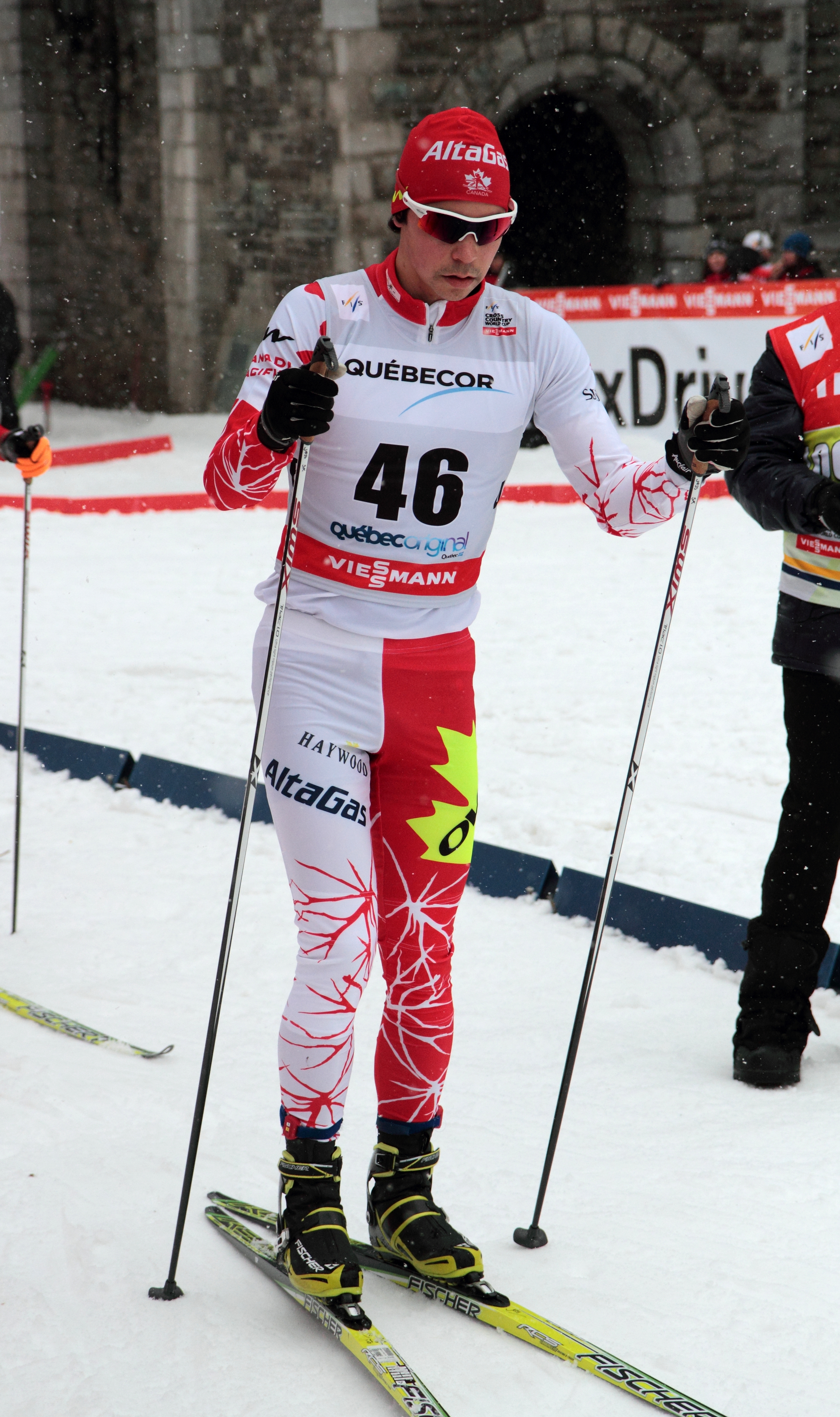
Jesse Cockney in 2012

Jesse Cockney (born July 26, 1989, in Yellowknife, Northwest Territories) is a Canadian Olympic cross-country skier of Inuvialuit heritage whose father, Angus Cockney, also was a Canadian national team member and national champion. The 2014 Winter Olympic Games in Sochi, Russia is where Cockney made his Olympic debut. Cockney competed in two events at Sochi, the sprint, and the 50 km mass start, which are the shortest and longest events at the Games. Prior to the Olympics, Cockney had a successful Junior career, winning three gold medals at the 2011 Canada Winter Games (15 km classic, free sprint, and 4x5km relay). He also made his World Cup debut in 2011. While growing up in Canmore, Alberta, Cockney participated in the ski development program. Cockney is a member of the Nordic Hills Ski Club and Canadian Senior Team. He is fluent in both English and French. Actress and activist Marika Sila is his younger sister.

== Career ==
Jesse Cockney made his Olympic debut in Russia, at Sochi 2014, where he competed in both the sprint race and long-distance race. He gained success through a noteworthy unjunior career, winning four medals at the 2011 Canada Winter Games (three gold and one bronze). He also finished sixth in the classic sprint at the 2011 FIS Nordic Ski World Under-23 Championships. In January 2011, Cockney made his first World Cup appearance. In December 2012, in his hometown of Canmore, Alberta, he would finish ninth in the free sprint. Cockney showcases a lot of promise as a member of the Canadian National Team. He is a member of the Foothills Nordic Ski Club.

Personal life

Jesse Cockney began skiing at the early age of three years old, in Yellowknife, Northwest Territories. He grew up with his father, Angus Cockney as a mentor both athletically and culturally. Cockney's heritage of being an Inuvialuk allowed him to learn from his father's traditional carvings and stories. To further develop his skills in skiing, his family decided it was best to move to Canmore, Alberta, when he was seven years old. Growing up in Alberta's ski programs helped Cockney to excel in skiing. He credits his parents, and a close group of friends as having helped him to achieve his goals. Cockney states that he is proud of his Aboriginal heritage as an Inuvialuk; one of his personal goals is to be seen as a role model for Aboriginal children in Canada. In Cockney's spare time away from his competitive athletic career, he enjoys to cook, climb, travel, watch and play American football, and fish. In 2022, Cockney competed with his sister Marika Sila on The Amazing Race Canada 8.

== Notable international and World Cup results ==
In 2011 at the Canada Winter Games held in Halifax, Cockney powered his way to the top, winning three gold medals in the 4x5km relay, sprint free, and 15 km classic. Cockney's achievements in the FIS Nordic Ski Championships included a twelfth-place finish in the 4x10km relay, fifteenth in the sprint free, and forty-eighth in the 15 km classic in 2011. In 2013, Cockney finished in twelfth again at the 4x10km relay) and fortieth in the sprint classic. In 2015, Cockney earned his highest finish with tenth place in the 4x10km relay, thirteenth in team sprint free, and fourteenth in the sprint classic. In 2013 Cockney earned 29 points; 2015 was a career low at 2 points, then in 2016 he earned 26 points, and he had 26 points to start 2017. In February 2017 at the PyeongChang test event, Cockney finished 10th overall in the classic sprint. His most recent competition was held at the 2018 Winter Olympics in PyeongChang, where he competed in the men's cross country skiing sprint classic, placing 35th overall.

== Olympic results ==
Event		Result
Sprint	Jesse Cockney; Canada at the 2014 Winter Olympics (Canada)	53rd
50 kilometre	Jesse Cockney; Canada at the 2014 Winter Olympics (Canada)	56th
4x10 kilometre relay	Jesse Cockney; Canada at the 2014 Winter Olympics (Canada)	12th
Sprint	Jesse Cockney; Canada at the 2018 Winter Olympics (Canada)	35th
