= Geoff Richards (professor) =

Biomaterials and orthopaedic researcher

Robert Geoffrey "Geoff" Richards is a biomaterials and orthopaedic researcher based in Davos, Switzerland. He is Director of the AO Research Institute Davos and Executive Director Research and Development at the AO Foundation. His research is associated with orthopaedics, trauma and infection; as of July 2026, his Google Scholar profile listed 25,310 citations and an h-index of 75.

== Career ==
Richards has worked at the AO Foundation in Davos, where he has served as Director of the AO Research Institute Davos and Executive Director Research and Development. His Google Scholar profile identifies his areas of work as orthopaedics, trauma and infection, and lists highly cited publications in biomaterials, fracture-related infection, osteoblast cell models, osteogenesis, and implant-surface research.

== Awards, honours ==
Richards has received several awards and honours in recognition of his contributions to biomaterials and orthopaedic research. These include the Klaas de Groot Award of the European Society for Biomaterials (ESB) (2024), the International Combined Orthopaedic Research Societies (ICORS) Transformative Contribution Award (2022), and the ESB Jean Leray Award (2004).

He has been elected Fellow of multiple professional organisations, including the Tissue Engineering and Regenerative Medicine International Society, the Orthopaedic Research Society, the Learned Society of Wales (the national academy for arts and sciences), the International College of Fellows of Orthopaedic Research, and also Biomaterials Science and Engineering. He holds Life Honorary Membership of the Swiss Society for Biomaterials (2010). Additional distinctions include an Honorary Fellowship from Aberystwyth University (2019) and the award of Doctor Honoris Causa from the Technical University of Varna (2016).

== Editorial and professional service ==
Richards was one of the founders of European Cells & Materials, together with Iolo ap Gwynn and Godfried Roomans, according to the journal's own history. The Directory of Open Access Journals describes European Cells & Materials as a peer-reviewed open-access journal in regenerative medicine, tissue engineering and the musculoskeletal system, and states that it began publishing in open access in 2001.

Richards served as president of the Tissue Engineering and Regenerative Medicine International Society from 2019 to 2021.
