= Wentworth, Nova Scotia =

Community in Nova Scotia, Canada

Coordinates: 45°39′26.09″N 63°32′46.66″W

Wentworth in Nova Scotia

Wentworth is a community in the Canadian province of Nova Scotia, located in the Wentworth Valley of Cumberland County. It is named after Sir John Wentworth, a former lieutenant-governor of the province.

The community takes in the following hamlets:

- Lower Wentworth
- Wentworth Centre
- Wentworth Station
- Wentworth Valley
- East Wentworth
- West Wentworth
- Appleton

The area is also the home of an alpine ski hill, Ski Wentworth, along with a provincial park and the Wentworth Hostel.

In April 2020, Wentworth was one of the locations associated with the 2020 Nova Scotia attacks, the deadliest rampage in Canada's history. At least four were killed there.
