= Ski Martock =

Alpine ski resort in Nova Scotia, Canada

- Interactive map of Ski Martock
- Location: West Hants, Nova Scotia
- Nearest city: Windsor, Nova Scotia, Canada
- Coordinates: 44°56′07″N 64°10′19″W
- Vertical: 183 m (600 ft)
- Top elevation: 212 m (696 ft)
- Base elevation: 29 m (95 ft)
- Skiable area: 24.3 ha (60 acres)
- Trails: 7
- Lift system: Chairlift, T-Bar & Magic Carpet
- Lift capacity: 2400/hour
- Terrain parks: Yes
- Snowfall: 254 cm (100 in)
- Snowmaking: Yes
- Night skiing: Yes
- Website: http://www.martock.com/

Ski Martock is a ski resort located near Windsor, Nova Scotia, Canada. The facilities feature a downhill area served by a quad chair lift and two T-bars(one functional), a beginners area served by Magic Carpet.

The hill features a terrain park for snowboarding and freeskiing. It is the second largest ski hill in Nova Scotia, second only to Ski Wentworth.

Martock is the closest downhill ski area to the Halifax Regional Municipality, Atlantic Canada's largest city, being roughly a 45-minute drive away. During the 2011 Canada Winter Games, it hosted the cross country skiing events.

== Trails ==
Trail	Difficulty
Expressway	
Strawberry Jinx	
Sundance	
Shane's Solution	
Glades	
Buttermilk	
Old Buttermilk	
Bunny Hill	

== Lifts ==
Ski Martock has 1 Quad Chairlift, 1 T-Bar, and 1 Magic Carpet lift for the bunny hill, all which are operational.

== See also ==
- List of ski areas and resorts in Canada
