= Folly Lake (Colchester County) =

Lake in Nova Scotia, Canada

Folly Lake (Colchester)
- Location within Nova Scotia
- Location: Colchester County, Nova Scotia
- Coordinates: 45.538°N 63.546°W
- Basin countries: Canada

Folly Lake is a lake of Colchester County, in Nova Scotia, Canada.

== See also ==
- List of lakes in Nova Scotia
