= Sackville High School =

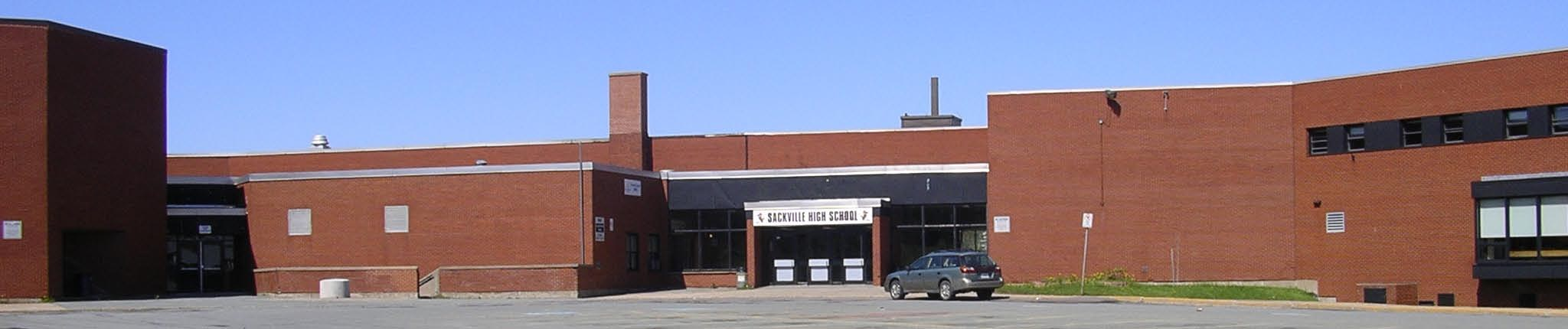

Location
- 1 Kingfisher Way; Lower Sackville, Nova Scotia, B4C 2Y9; Canada; 44°46′30″N 63°40′29″W

Information
- School type: High school, Secondary
- Founded: 1972
- School board: Halifax Regional Centre for Education
- Principal: Canavan, Trina
- Grades: 9-12
- Enrollment: 776 (2023)
- Language: English, Early French Immersion, Late French Immersion
- Area: 143,528 ft2
- Colours: Orange and Black
- Mascot: Dudley (Kingfisher)
- Team name: Kingfishers
- Website: svh.hrce.ca

Sackville High School is a Canadian public high school located in Lower Sackville, a suburban community of the Halifax Regional Municipality in Nova Scotia, Canada. It is operated by the Halifax Regional Centre for Education (HRCE). Sackville High School's feeder schools are A.J. Smeltzer Junior High School and Leslie Thomas Junior High School.

Along with English, Sackville High offers the French immersion program for all students in grades 9–12. It also has the largest gymnasium in the Atlantic provinces.

== Notable events ==
- Sackville High helped host a Ukrainian student survivor of the Chernobyl Disaster; the school was later featured in the book Out of Chernobyl: A Girl Named Olga.
- In April 1995, a student was killed on school grounds.
- In 2005, an anchorwoman visited Sackville High School for CTV News to investigate rumours of an "underground fight club" happening on school grounds. The club turned out to be real, but as a number of member students attested, "all in good fun".
- In 2021, Sackville High School constructed a tribute to Indigenous Canadian children killed in the residential school system. Sackville High offers courses in Indigenous Studies, as well as copies of fiction and non-fiction Indigenous books in its school library.
