= Ski Wentworth =

Ski hill in Wentworth, Nova Scotia, Canada

- Interactive map of Ski Wentworth
- Location: Cumberland County, Nova Scotia, Canada
- Nearest city: Truro
- Coordinates: 45°36′36″N 63°33′23″W
- Vertical: 249 m (817 ft)
- Top elevation: 302 m (991 ft)
- Base elevation: 53 m (174 ft)
- Skiable area: 0.61 km^{2} (0.24 sq mi)
- Trails: 23
- Longest run: 2.8 km (1.7 mi)
- Lift system: 4 (1 magic carpet (ski lift), 2 quad chairs, 1 T-Bar)
- Terrain parks: 2 (half pipe)
- Snowfall: 381 cm (150 in)
- Snowmaking: 75 %
- Night skiing: Yes
- Website: https://www.skiwentworth.ca/

Ski Wentworth is a Canadian alpine ski hill in Nova Scotia's Cobequid Hills.

Ski Wentworth is located in the hamlet of Wentworth in the Wentworth Valley, 48 km northwest of Truro and 67 km east of Amherst on Trunk 4.

It is the largest alpine ski facility in Nova Scotia, having a 248-metre (815 foot) vertical difference. It features 23 alpine trails, a half-pipe, and 2 terrain parks. The trails are varied in difficulty from beginner to expert and support both alpine skiing and snowboarding.

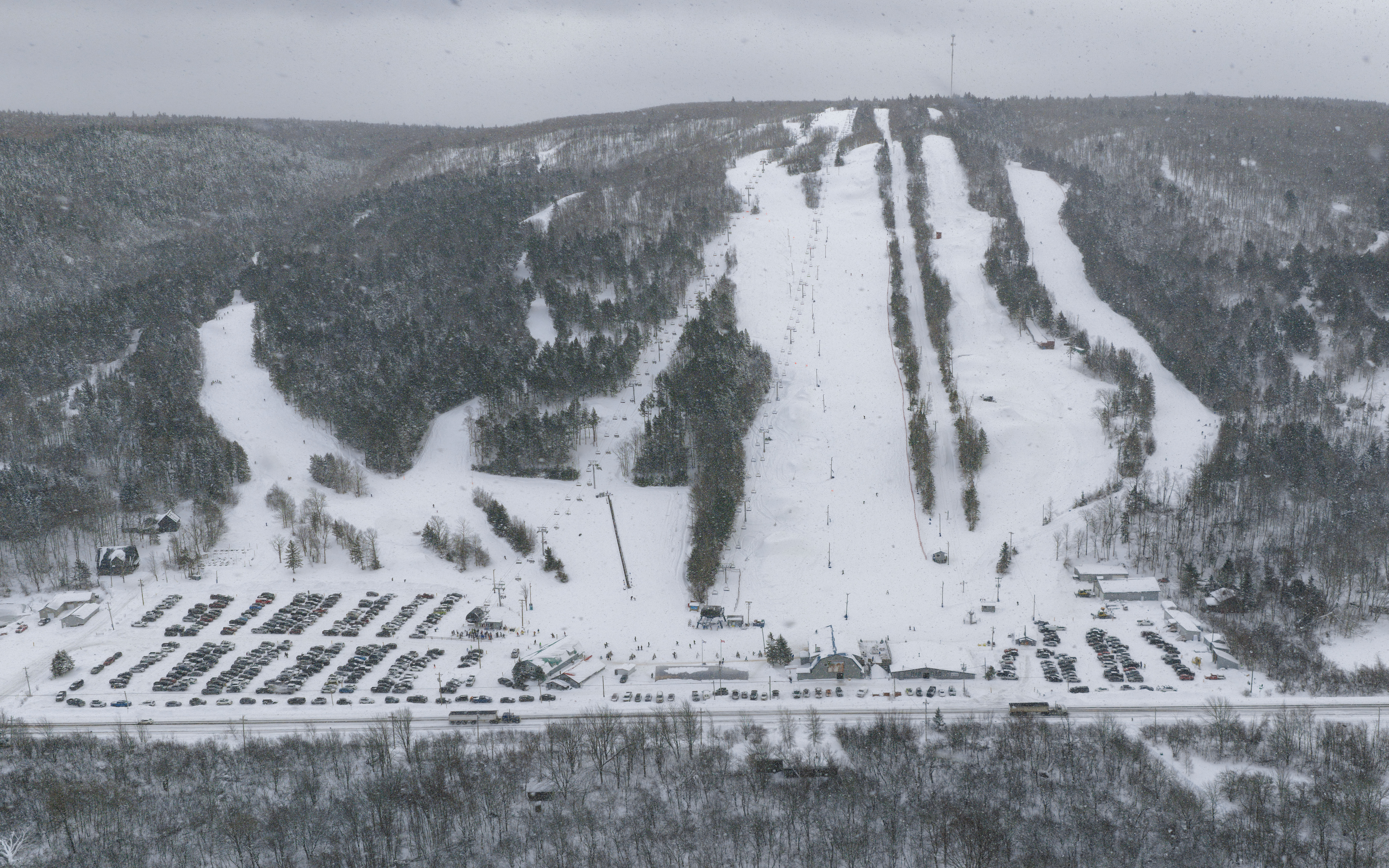
Aerial view during winter

== Trails ==
Trail	Difficulty
Bunny Hill	
Chickadee	
Robin's Run	
Sissy	
Rosebowl	
Sugar Shack	
Garden Path	
Horse Pastures	
Feffie	
Gooey	
Beaver	
Bunny Hill	
Beaver	
Giggletree	
Embree	
Gambol	
Garden Path	
Horse Pastures	
Hurricane	
Black Fly	
Sun Bowl	
Helter Skelter	
Sugar Shack	

Wentworth also has varied glade or tree trails from intermediate to advanced. Glade trails exist over almost the entire mountain and are largely unmarked on the trail map.

== Lifts ==
Wentworth has 2 Quad chair lifts, 1 T-bar lift and 1 Magic carpet (ski lift).

== Terrain Park ==
The Terrain Park features many jumps, rails and boxes for all

== 2011 Canada Winter Games ==
Ski Wentworth was the main venue for the 2011 Canada Winter games in terms of Alpine and free-style Skiing. As of Summer 2009 construction was underway to enlarge the half-pipe as well as to improve the snow making equipment and re-create the moguls trail. The upgrades also featured new trails.

== Other services ==
Wentworth has an outlet in the main lodge, offering a selection of ski and snowboard equipment, clothing and accessories. The SKIGLOO Daycare is open Weekends and Holidays from 9am to 4pm, and Friday nights 7pm to 10pm, throughout the entire season. The outlet also tunes and repairs equipment. The rental shop at Ski Wentworth features a variety of skis, boards and blades as well as boots, poles and helmets. Ski Wentworth also has ski and snowboard lessons and is patrolled by the Canadian Ski Patrol.
