= Folly Lake, Nova Scotia =

Community in Nova Scotia, Canada

Coordinates: 45°33′14″N 63°32′55″W

Folly Lake in Nova Scotia

Folly Lake is a community in the Canadian province of Nova Scotia, located in Colchester County.
