= IRIAF =

IRIAF can refer to:

- Institut des Risques Industriels, Assurantiels et Financiers, part of the University of Poitiers in France
- Islamic Republic of Iran Air Force
