= Bitard =

French symbol

Representation of the Bitard: beech marten head, carp body, turkey and peacock feathers, hare paws and academic palms

The Bitard is a fabulous animal. It is the symbol of the Ordre du Vénéré Bitard (Loué Soit-Il !) or Order of the Venerated Bitard (May He be Blessed!), a student association of University of Poitiers (France) created in the 1920s. The members themselves are also called Bitards and in some occasions they wear a cape colored according to their rank in the Order, along with a faluche, the traditional French Student cap. The Bitards' faluche has the particularity of being decorated with a chevron and having its own code for the signification of insignias. The folklore of the Order refers to François Rabelais as the word bitard appears twice in hunting outcomes in Pantagruel.

Each year, the Order organizes a one-week festival, called the 69^{e} Semaine estudiantine (69th Students' Week). Various festive activities happen during this week, including a procession, drinking events and a Bitard hunting. There is also a fresco depicting the hunting of the Bitard on an interior wall of the Roche-d'Argent university restaurant (located in downtown Poitiers, near the Saint-Jean baptistery). A concrete statue of a phallus, called "quéquette" or "blanche verge et les sept mains", erected by the Order of the Bitard in 1976 on the Poitiers campus, is a folk symbol for Poitiers students. The sculpture accidentally destroyed, during construction, in October 2015, was rebuilt, in April 2016.
