= Kallawtah =

Turkic headgear

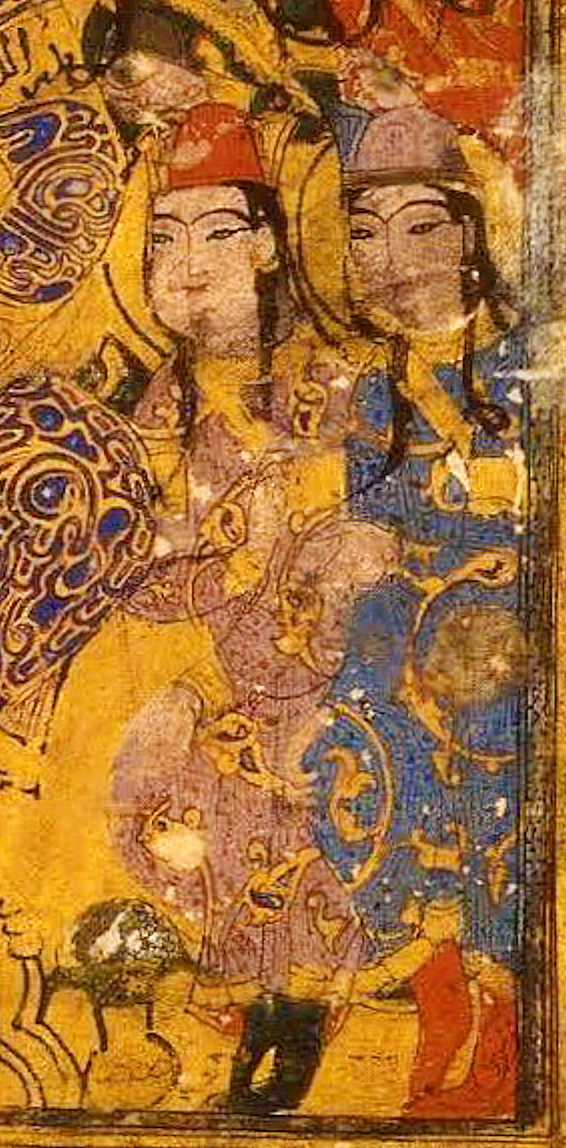
Kallawtah headgear worn by royal attendants at the court of Badr al-Din Lu'lu'. Kitab al-Aghani in 1217 CE

The Kallawtah or kallaftah (كلوتة, kalloutah "bonnet") was a type of Turkic headgear worn during the Middle Ages in the Middle East. It was semi-spherical, and generally worn by the military class without a turban around. Another important headgear of the period was the sharbush.

In Mamluk Egypt the kallawtah was originally prescribed to be yellow, but Sultan al-Ashraf Khalīl (r. 689–93/1290–93) had it changed to the color red, with the addition of a turban around it.

Etymologically, the term is thought to be at the origin of the word "Calotte", which is used from architecture to religious headware in western languages.

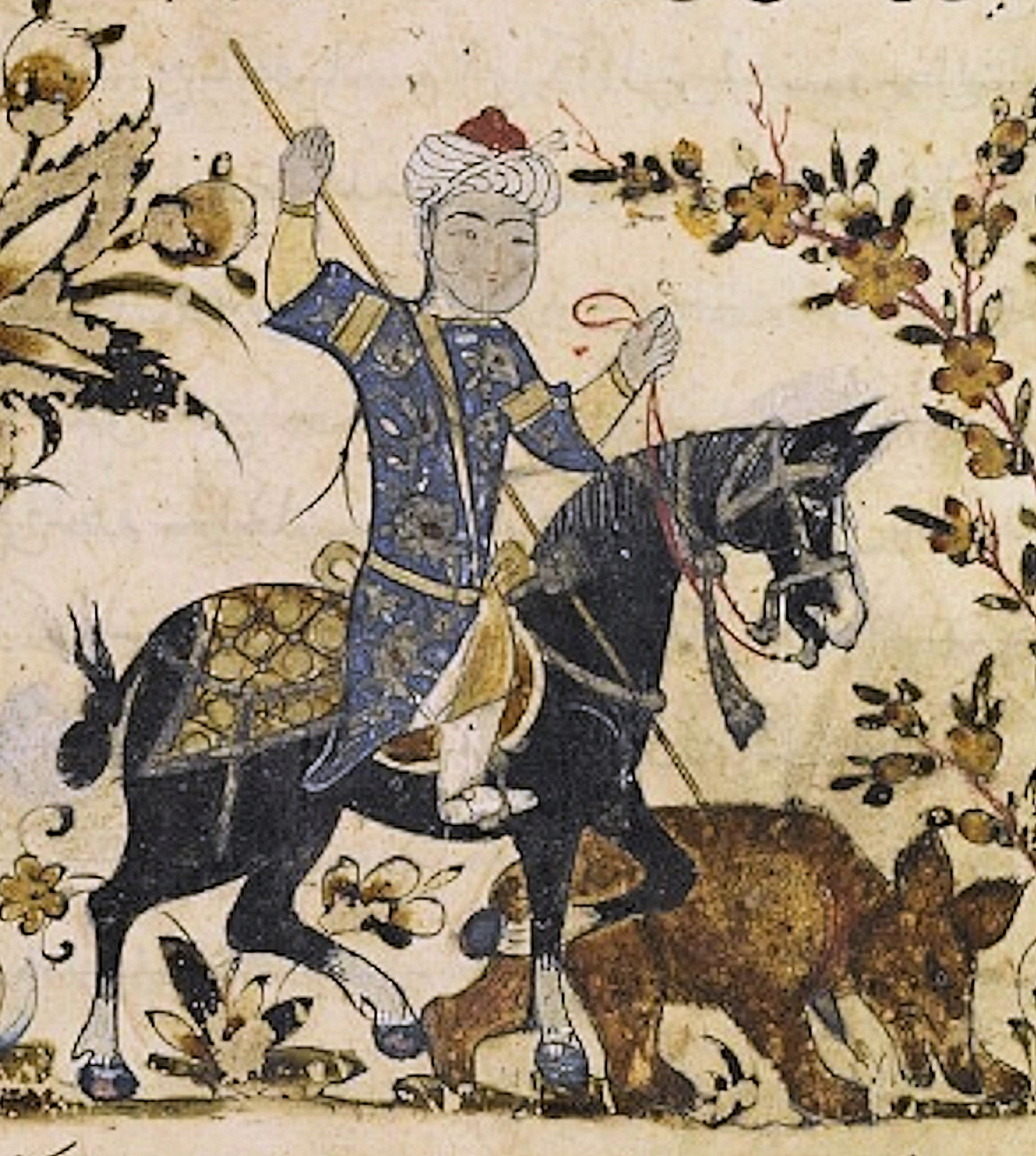
Horseman impales a bear. Nihāyat al-su’l by Aḥmad al-Miṣrī ("the Egyptian"), dated 1371, Mamluk Egypt or Syria. He is wearing the red kallawtah headgear, with a turban wrapped around.

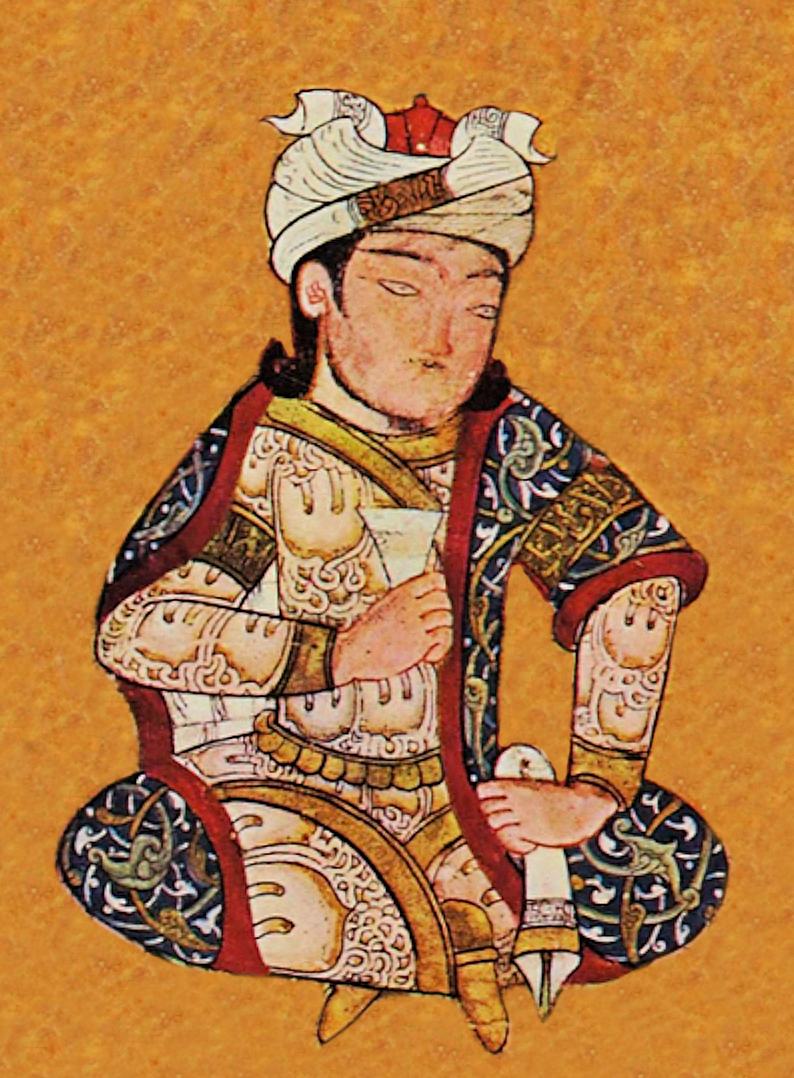
Prince with Turkic features and clothing (detail). Maqamat of al-Hariri 1334, probably Egypt. Possible depiction of Sultan an-Nasir Muhammad, who was himself of Kipchak (Turkic) and Mongol descent.
