= University of Artois =

Public university based in northern France

Coordinates: 50.283°N 2.794°E

- Université d'Artois
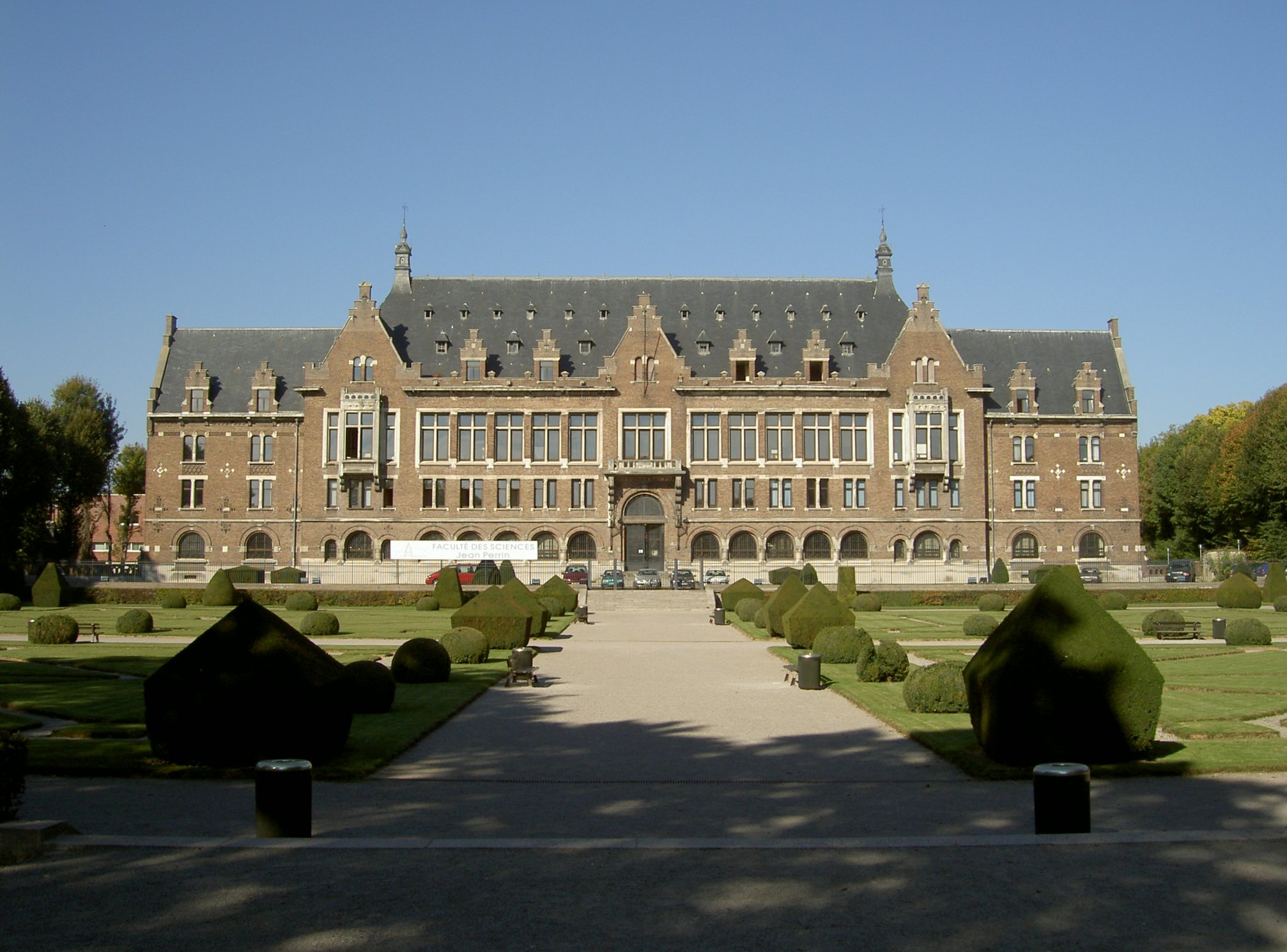
- Lens campus
- Type: Public
- Established: 1992; 34 years ago
- Affiliations: AUF, COMUE Lille Nord de France, EUA
- President: Pasquale Mammone
- Students: 28,143
- Location: Arras (main); Béthune; Douai; Lens; Liévin, Hauts-de-France, France
- Campus: Small town
- Website: Official Site

The University of Artois (French: Université d'Artois) is a public university situated in the Nord and Pas-de-Calais departments of northern France.

It is situated on 5 campuses in Arras, Béthune, Douai, Lens and Liévin.

The University of Artois is a member of the European Doctoral College Lille-Nord-Pas de Calais and the University of Lille Nord de France group of universities.

: campus sites

== Academics ==
The university offers bachelors, vocational bachelors, masters, and doctoral degrees in the arts and humanities, as well as in various STEM fields.

The university also offers BUT and DEUST certifications in several fields, including business, management, mechanical engineering, and technology.

== Composition ==
The University of Artois consists of 8 faculties and 2 technology institutes:

=== Arras campus ===
- Faculty of History, Geography, and Heritage Studies
- Faculty of Foreign Languages
- Faculty of Letters and Arts
- Faculty of Economics, Management, Administration, and Social Sciences

=== Béthune campus ===
- Béthune Institute of Technology
- Faculty of Applied Science

=== Douai campus ===
- Faculty of Law

=== Lens campus ===
- Faculty of Sciences
- Lens Institute of Technology: Commerce, Management, IT, Digital Media Studies, Health Services

=== Liévin campus ===
- Faculty of Sports and Physical Education

== Notable faculty ==
- Jean-Pierre Arrignon (1943-2021) - historian
- Laurent Warlouzet (born 1978) - historian

== Notable alumni ==
- Bruno Bilde (born 1976) - politician
- Bruno Studer (born 1978) - politician
- Hugues Fabrice Zango (born 1993) - Burkinabé athlete who specialises in the triple jump and the long jump

== See also ==
- List of public universities in France by academy
- European Doctoral College Lille Nord-Pas de Calais
