= ENSAR =

French engineering school of risk and data science

- ENSAR, Ecole Nationale Supérieure des sciences Applicatives et du Risque
- Type: Public
- Established: 2024
- Director: Jean-Marc Bascans
- Location: Niort, France
- Affiliations: University of Poitiers

The National Graduate School of Applied Sciences and Risk (Ecole Nationale Supérieure des sciences Applicatives et du Risque), also known as ENSAR, is an engineering grande école at the University of Poitiers in Niort, France, established in 2024. It was previously known as the Institute of Industrial Insurance and Financial Risks, which was created in 2001. ENSAR offers a risk management course with a focus on quality, safety and environment (QSE), or information system security (ISS), as well as a data science course. Apprenticeship training is compulsory in the second and third years of study. As of October 2025, the school had 143 students and aimed to increase enrollment to 310 within three years.
