= Laurent Warlouzet =

French academic (born 1978)

Laurent Warlouzet (born 1978) is a French academic who is currently Professor of European History at Paris Sorbonne University.

== Background ==
Professor Warlouzet was educated at Paris 4 University. He was appointed associate professor at the Université d'Artois and subsequently full professor at University of the Littoral, before moving to Sorbonne University in 2019. He held postdoctoral fellowships at the European University Institute in Florence and at LSE, where he taught in the MSc History of International Relations. He co-lead with Kiran Klaus Patel the Franco-German research program ELEMENT on the history of European environmental policies (1980–2000).

== Historian of Europe and of capitalism ==
Professor Warlouzet is a specialist in the history of European integration and of globalisation. He focuses on economic, social and environmental policies. In his book Governing Europe in a Globalizing World, he interpreted the history of European integration between 1973 and 1986 as a contest between different projects, wherein competition policy played a major role in the assertion of a neoliberal Europe. He studied the early years of European environmental policy, and the project of democratization of companies (the 'Vredeling directive'). In Foreign Affairs, Andrew Moravcsik offered a balanced review of the book, stating that: “Although Warlouzet is sometimes tempted to exaggerate the range of potential choices governments faced, in the end, his book proposes some clear answers”.

On Brexit, Warlouzet has emphasized in an article published in the Journal of Common Market Studies the outsized influence Britain traditionally exercised over the EEC/EU during its years as a member-state.

He co-edited with Brigitte Leucht and Katja Seidel Reinventing Europe, the first textbook on the history of European integration since 1945 that includes chapters on Euroscepticism, on environmental policy, on migration, and on Central and Eastern European countries.

He has studied the growing importance of the far-right in Europe, particularly its economic policies, linking illiberalism and neoliberalism.

An expert on EU and French politics, he writes in Le Monde and Project Syndicate. He was quoted by the Guardian, the Daily Telegraph, the Süddeutsche Zeitung, by the Danish newspaper Information, by the Helsingin Sanomat, by Il Fatto Quotidiano and by La Libre Belgique.

== Liberty, Solidarity and Community ==
In his book entitled: Liberty, Solidarity and Community. Capitalism and European Integration, 1945 to the Present, he strives to answer the following questions: How can economic growth, social inclusion, environmental protection, and peace and security be promoted simultaneously? How have Europeans risen to this challenge since 1945 ?

The book argues first that capitalism is not just a contest between free-markeeters and their opponents, those in favour of welfare and environmental policies, because there is a third camp which defends protectionism and assertive defence policies. Hence, the governance of capitalism has three foundational principles – liberty, solidarity and community. He applied this lens to the history of European integration from 1945 to 2025, with a particular focus on Britain, Germany, France and the European Commission. The book examines debates among Europeans on how to respond to global interdependence, including issues such as the Trump challenge, the rise of protectionism, climate change, and social tensions. It includes alternatives to neoliberalism that were developed in the past such as planning, the control of multinationals or a 1992 project of European carbon tax.

It was reviewed by economist Barry Eichengreen in Foreign Affairs.

The book was translated in German as Freiheit, Solidarität und Macht. Europäischer Kapitalismus seit 1945. It was reviewed in the Frankfurter Allegemeine Zeitung.

== Bibliography ==
- Warlouzet, L., Liberty, Solidarity and Community. Capitalism and European Integration, 1945 to the Present, 2026 (Cambridge University Press) ISBN 9781009682633
- Warlouzet, L., Leucht, B., Seidel K., Reinventing Europe. The History of the European Union, 1945 to the Present, 2023 (Bloomsbury) ISBN 978-1-350-21307-4
- Warlouzet, L., Europe contre Europe. Entre liberté, solidarité et puissance, 2022 (CNRS éditions) ISBN 978-2-271-13846-0
- Warlouzet, L., Governing Europe in a Globalizing World: Neoliberalism and its Alternatives following the 1973 Oil Crisis, 2018 (Routledge) ISBN 978-1-138-72942-1
- Warlouzet, L., Le choix de la CEE par la France. Les débats économiques de Pierre Mendès-France à Charles de Gaulle (1955-1969), 2011 (Igpde) ISBN 978-2-11-097517-1
- Guieu, J.-M., Le Dréau, C., Ralfik, J., Warlouzet, L., Penser et construire l’Europe, 1919-1992, 2007 (Belin sup) ISBN 978-2-7011-4655-3
- Rücker, K., Warlouzet, L. (eds), Which Europe (s). New Approaches in European Integration History, 2006 (Peter Lang) ISBN 978-90-5201-484-5
