= Jules Gosselet =

French geologist (1832–1916)

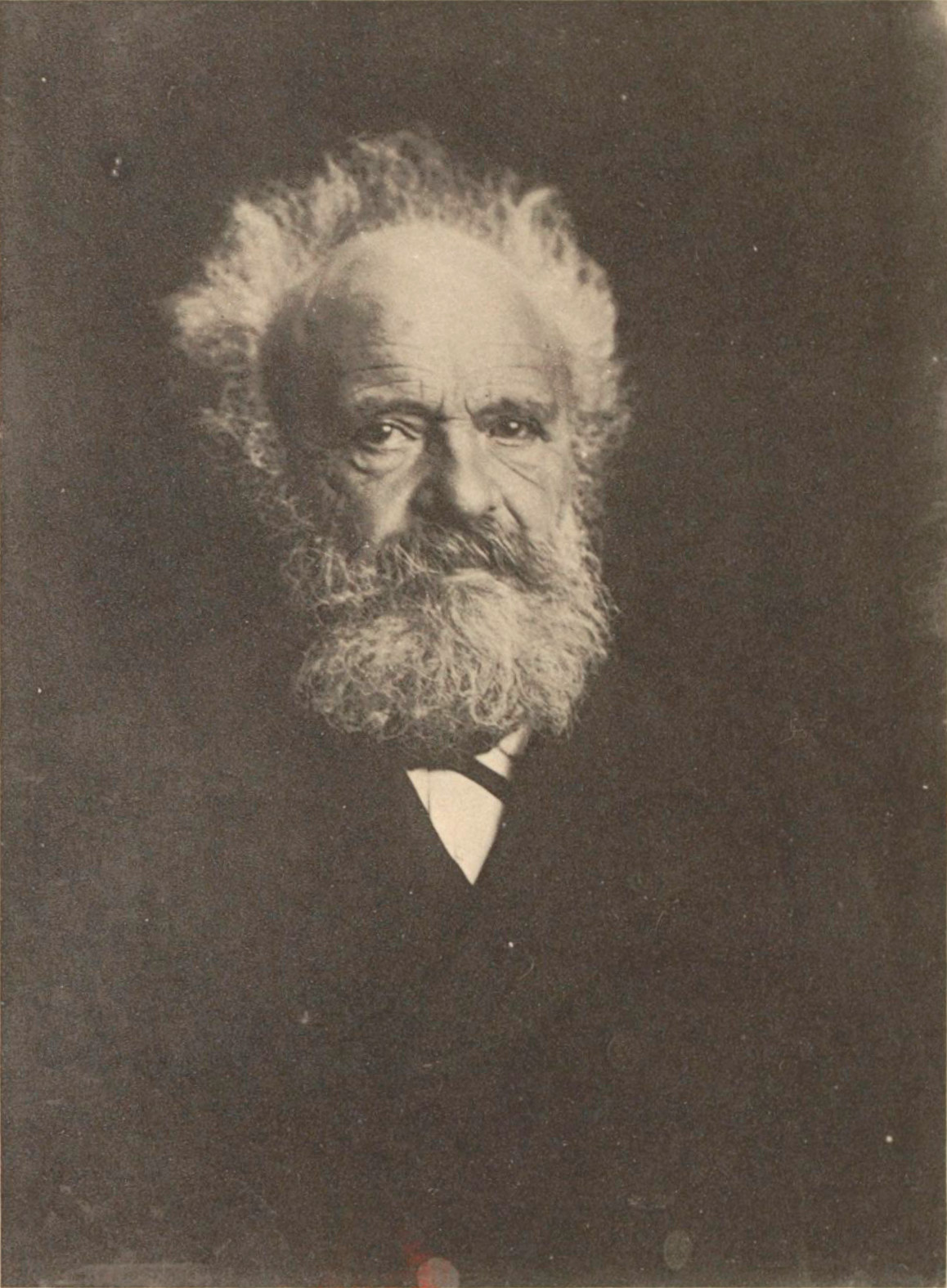
- Jules Gosselet in 1902
- Born: 19 April 1832; Cambrai, France
- Died: 20 March 1916 (aged 83); Lille, France
- Scientific career
- Fields: Geology
- Thesis: Sur les terrains primaires de la Belgique, des environs d'Avesnes et du Boulonnais (1860)

Jules-Auguste-Alexandre Gosselet (19 April 1832 – 20 March 1916) was a French geologist born in Cambrai, France.

Following unsuccessful studies of pharmacy, and a stint as a mathematics teacher at the Lycée du Quesnoy, he pursued a career in natural history. In 1853 he became a preparateur of geology at the Sorbonne, later obtaining his doctorate with a thesis titled Mémoire sur les terrains primaires de la Belgique, des environs d'Avesnes et du Boulonnais (1860).

He later taught high school physics and chemistry in Bordeaux, afterwards serving as an instructor of natural history at the Faculty of Poitiers. In 1864 he was appointed to the chair of geology at the recently established Faculty of Lille. In 1913 he became a non-resident member of the Academy of Sciences.

Gosselet is remembered for his geological studies of northern France, as demonstrated by the title of one of his better known works: Esquisse géologique du Nord de la France et des contrées voisines (Geological sketches of Nord and neighboring regions), (1880). Other significant writings include a geological treatise on the Ardennes, L'Ardenne (1888), and hydrogeological research on the aquifers of Nord, Leçons sur les nappes aquifères du Nord (1887). Also, he is credited with providing a thorough description of the geological beds in the limestone at Étrœungt (schistes et calcaire d’Etroeungt).

In the field of paleontology, he performed pioneer "zoometric" research of a species of brachiopod known as Spirifer verneuilli (Etudes sur les variations du Spirifer Verneuilli).

Since 1910, the Prix Gosselet is awarded every four years for accomplishments made in the field of applied geology. The mineral gosseletite, a phase of manganian andalusite, is named after him.
