= Calotte (Belgium) =

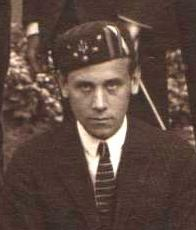
A student of the Catholic University of Leuven wearing a calotte in 1921

The calotte (plural calottes, French from Provençal calota or Italian calotta) is a skullcap worn by students at Catholic universities in Belgium. It originates from the skullcap worn by the Papal Zouave regiment around 1860. The calotte is cylindrical, made from velvet and astrakhan (pelt of newborn lamb). The color of the top is bordeau red for the universities of Brussels, Leuven, Louvain-la-Neuve and Namur, white for the university of Ghent and emerald for the university of Liège. In the front of the calotte are stripes representing the Belgian flag (black, yellow and red) and stripes representing the colors of the city or the university where the calotte has been received. At the back of the calotte, the faculty of the student is represented by a color and a symbol, with if needed an additional symbol to determine the speciality. Golden stars around the calotte represent the number of years that the student has studied successfully (if a year has to be retaken, a silver star will represent it). In addition to that, a number of official and personal pins will be added to the calotte, all representing facts about its owner. Examples include:

- Official position in a student organisation (above the considered year's star)
- Hobbies and occupations (cardplayer, partyer...)
- Character (patriot, lazy...)

== History ==
Several legends explain the appearance of the calotte at the Belgian Catholic universities, but none has been definitely corroborated.

In a first version, it starts after the troops of Victor Emmanuel II of Italy invaded the Papal States in 1870. Hundreds of Belgian students went to Italy to defend the papal sovereignty. One tradition has it that Zouave soldiers rejoined the University of Louvain (UCLouvain) and started the tradition of the calotte. In another version, Edmond Carton de Wiart, one of the founders of the General Society for Brussels's Students (français: Société Générale catholique des étudiants bruxellois), a law student in the town of Leuven, wore the cap to go skating on the frozen lakes in the winter. A few days later, more students started wearing the calotte, until it developed into a sort of new trend. In the 19th century, the calotte was worn by Catholic students only (called calottins), while the penne, another cap with a very long peak, was worn by liberal (i.e. non-Catholic) students (the gueux). Rivalry between the two factions led to numerous bloody disputes on both sides, a tradition which still persists, albeit less heatedly, to this day. During the 1980s, the tradition of the calotte was revived after the Catholic University of Louvain was split between French speaking and Dutch-speaking Universities, the former moving to a new campus at Louvain-la-Neuve, which in turn brought about a resurgence of ancient student traditions, among them the calotte.

The calotte is awarded after a rite of passage called Corona (from Latin crown, for the shape of the assembly) by numerous student unions called "Ordres", "Cercles" and "Régionales" to hundreds of students each year.

The qualifications required for receiving a calotte vary, but always include a minimum time spent on a given campus, a knowledge of the calotte, Latin formulas and student songs.

== Symbolism ==
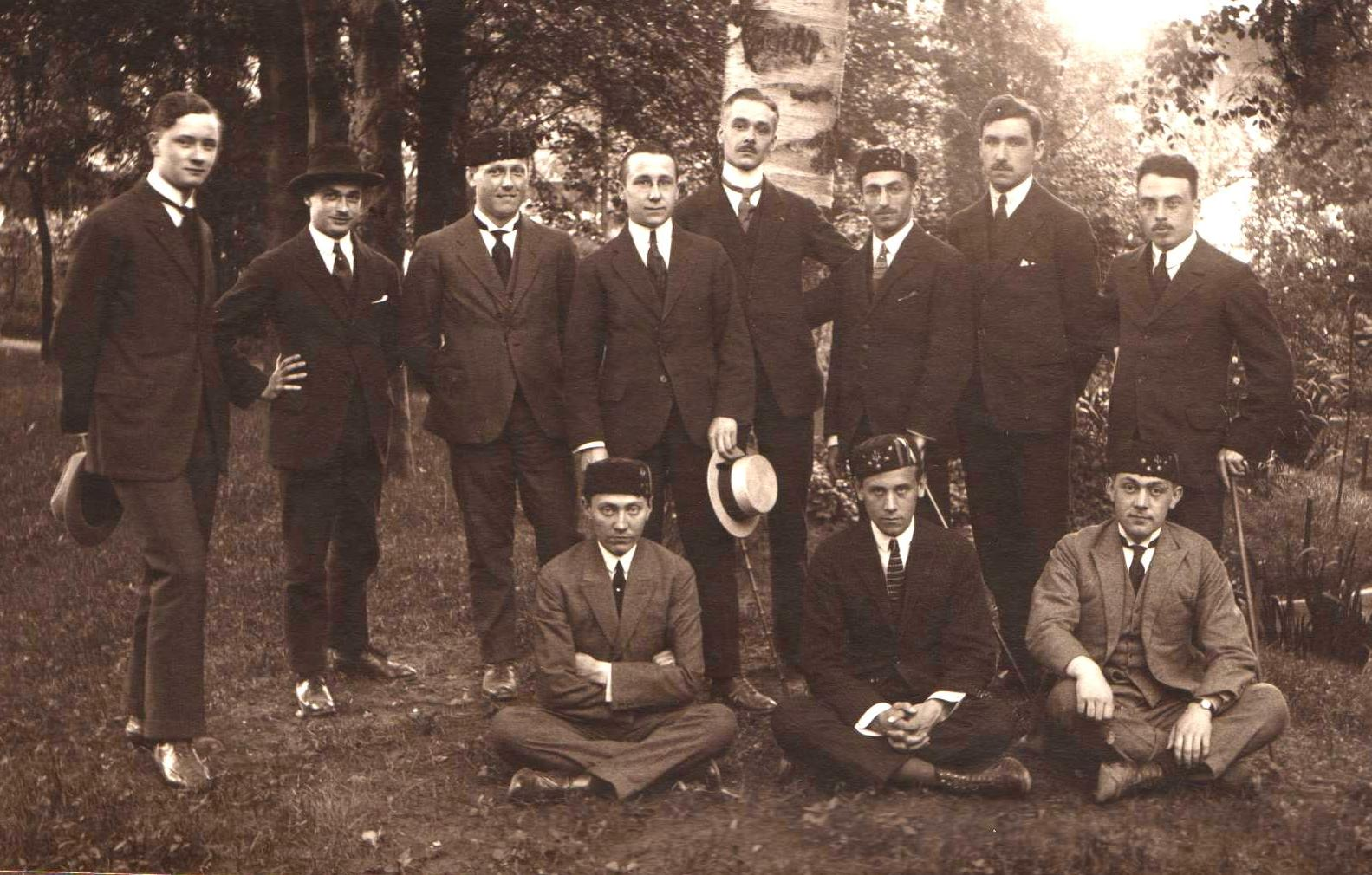
Belgian law students at Catholic University of Leuven (around 1921-1922) five of them wearing the "calotte" skull-cap.

The meaning of the calotte has evolved, but whatever the theories may be on its origins, the calotte is mainly a sign that indicates the student's belonging to a group. The student is also able to express his individuality by wearing several insignia on the calotte that will reflect their academic curriculum, their personal interests and even their character.

These insignia are not arbitrary, but have a shared meaning that is understood by most students in Belgium.

Because the calotte is a strong symbol for students at Catholic universities in Belgium, it is often associated with the broader Catholic institutions, and therefore used in anticlerical expressions.

In the Dutch-speaking part of Belgium, "kaloot" (plural "kaloten") is an epithet for clericalist Catholics. It is a pun on "calotte" and on "kloten" (the Dutch word for testicles, which plays the role of an all-purpose swear-word like "fuck" in English). In the French-speaking part of Belgium, "calotte" is mentioned in the following anticlerical song:

À bas la calotte, à bas la calotte
À bas les calotins ...

== The Banane Radieuse : particular case ==
A student who has lived a minimum number of years in Africa (minimum varies between 1 and 8 years) or was born on this continent, can be delivered a calotte called "Banane Radieuse". This calotte is identical to the traditional calotte, except for the top, where astrakhan is replaced by leopard fur.

== Student Hats in the World ==
- In Belgium : The Penne and the Calotte
- In Denmark : Studenterhuen
- In France : The Faluche
- In Luxembourg : The Casquette
- In Italy : The Feluca
- In Sweden : Studentmössan
- In Switzerland : The Stella
- In General: Student cap
