= Jean-Pierre Arrignon =

French historian and academic (1943–2021)

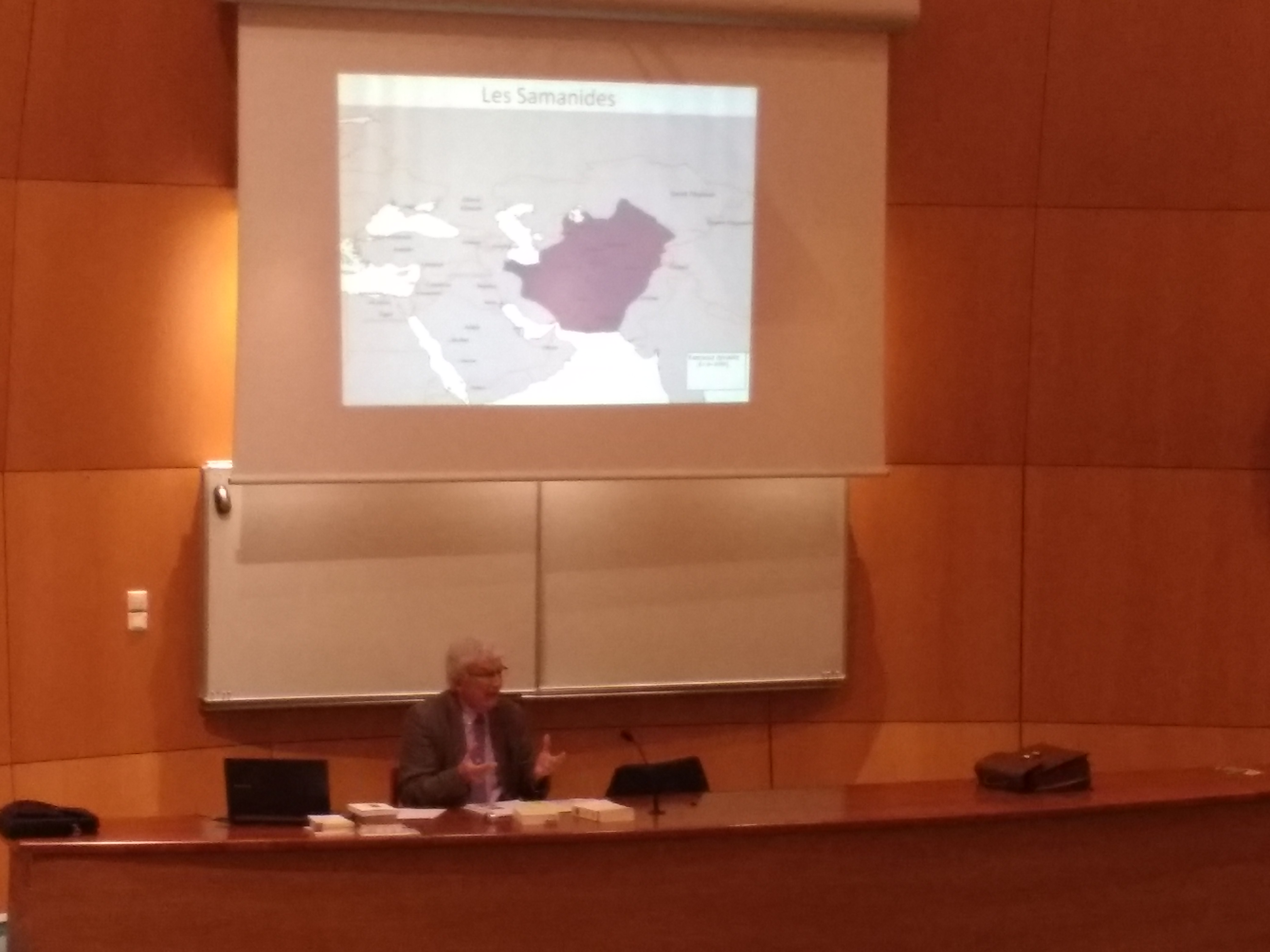
- Arrignon in 2017
- Born: 7 April 1943; Nantes, France
- Died: 13 April 2021 (aged 78); Paris, France
- Occupations: Historian; Academic

Jean-Pierre Arrignon (7 April 1943 – 13 April 2021) was a French academic and historian. He specialized in the Middle Ages and contemporary Russia.

== Biography ==
After earning an agrégation in history, Arrignon studied at the École pratique des hautes études. He defended a thesis titled La chaire métropolitaine de Kiev, des origines à 1240 at Pantheon-Sorbonne University in 1986 under the direction of Helene Ahrweiler. His research then centered around the medieval Slavic world, as well as modern-day Russia, largely centered around Vladimir Putin. He taught at the University of Poitiers and served as Dean of the Faculty of Human Sciences. He also served as an associate professor at Yaroslavl State University in Russia.

In 1998, Arrignon became a member of the Institut des hautes études de défense nationale (IHEDN) and became President of the IHEDN Nord-Pas-de-Calais - Belgique - Luxembourg Regional Association. He was a member of the scientific council at the University of Picardy Jules Verne and of the Comité français des études byzantines. He was also a professor of medieval history at the University of Artois, as well as a lecturer at the School for Advanced Studies in the Social Sciences.

Jean-Pierre Arrignon died in Paris on 13 April 2021, at the age of 78.

== Distinctions ==
- Knight of the Ordre national du Mérite
- Officer of the Ordre des Palmes académiques
- Doctor honoris causa at Yaroslavl State University

== Bibliography ==
- Histoire de l'Europe (1990)
- Les Églises slaves : des origines au xve siècle (1991)
- La France et les Français aux xive et xve siècles : société et population (1993)
- Byzance et le monde orthodoxe (1997)
- Christianisme et chrétientés en Occident et en Orient (milieu viie- milieu xie siècle) (1997)
- Ränder und Grenzen Europas - eine geopolitische Betrachtung (1999)
- L'Akrite : l'épopée byzantine de Digénis Akritas (2002)
- La Russie médiévale (2003)
- Byzance : économie et société (2007)
- Histoire du monde (2007)
- Russie (2008)
- Chronique de Nestor : naissance des mondes russes (2008)
- Pouvoirs, Église et société dans les royaumes de France, Bourgogne et Germanie aux Xe et XIe siècles (888-vers 1110) (2008)
- Les trente nuits qui ont fait l’histoire (2014)
- Russie des tsars : d'Ivan le Terrible à Vladimir Poutine (2016)
- Une Histoire de la Russie (2020)
