= Pascale Ballet =

French Egyptologist

Pascale Ballet (born 1953) is a French Egyptologist, and a Professor of Art History and Archaeology of Antiquity at the University of Poitiers. The subject of her thesis obtained in June 1980 under the leadership of Jean Leclant was on terracotta figurines from Egypt and the Mediterranean in the Hellenistic and Roman times, in which she is an expert.

She was a former member of the French Institute of Oriental Archaeology in Cairo, former director of the laboratory of the Hermes University of Poitiers and former member of the commission of specialists until 2008. She has also participated in excavations of Jean-Yves Empereur, and the Archaeological Mission at the site of Buto (Tell el Fara'in) in the Egyptian Delta.

== Publications ==
- La vie quotidienne à Alexandrie : 331-30 av. J.-C., Hachette Littératures, juin 1999 et août 2003 (ISBN 2012791573) .
- With Nathalie Bosson et Marguerite Rassart-Debergh, Kellia II : l'ermitage copte QR 195, FIFAO 49, IFAO, le Caire, janvier 2000 et 2003.
- With Hélène Cuvigny, Coptos, l'Égypte antique aux portes du désert, Hors collection, Musée des Beaux-arts de Lyon, février 2000.ISBN 2711837971
- With Dominique Valbelle, Jean-Yves Carrez-Maratray et Nord-Sinaï Mission franco-égyptienne de Tell el-Herr, Le camp romain du Bas-Empire à Tell el-Herr, Errance, 2000 et mars 2001.
- With Antigone Marangou-Lerat et Catherine Defernez, Céramiques hellénistiques et romaines, Productions et diffusion en Méditerranée orientale : Chypre, Égypte et côte syro-palestinienne, Maison Orient Méditerranéen, juillet 2002. (ISBN 2903264775)
- Bulletin de la Société française d'Archéologie classique (XXXIII, 2001-2002) - D'Alexandrie a Coptos, pérégrinations et avatars des dieux de terre cuite dans l'Égypte ptolémaïque et romaine, Revue archéologique, n° 1, Ernest Leroux, Paris, 2002.
- La ville et ses déchets dans le monde romain : rebuts et recyclages : Actes du colloque de Poitiers (19 - 21 septembre 2002), Archéologie et histoire romaine 10, Mergoil, Montagnac, 2003.
- With Michel Reddé, Charles Bonnet et Anca Lemaire, Douch, Tome 3 : Kysis : Fouilles de l'IFAO à Douch, oasis de Kharga (1985-1990), DFIFAO 42, IFAO, Le Caire, septembre 2004.
- With Guy Lecuyot, Jean-Pierre Brun, Catherine Defernez, Delphine Dixneuf, Eustathios Raptou, Michel Bonifay, Sylvie Marchand et Antigone Marangou-Lerat, Cahiers de la Céramique Egyptienne 8, pack en 2 volumes, CCE 8, IFAO, septembre 2007.
- With Nadine Dieudonné-Glad, Jean-Claude Margueron, Béatrice Muller, Hélène Dessales et Philippe-Alexandre Broder, Bernard Gauthiez, Pierre Ballet, Catherine Saliou, Sous La rue dans l'Antiquité : Définition, aménagement et devenir de l'Orient méditerranéen à la Gaule, Collection : Archéologie et culture, Presses Universitaires Rennes II, septembre 2008.
- With Elisabeth Dodinet, Jacques Santrot, Geneviève Pierrat, Jean-Paul Thuillier, Nicolas Garnier, Lydie Bodiou, Dominique Frère et Véronique Mehl, Parfums et odeurs dans l'Antiquité, Collection : Archéologie et culture, Presses Universitaires Rennes II, septembre 2008.
