= Calotte =

Calotte may refer to:

- Calotte (architecture), a round cavity or depression in architecture
- Calotte or zucchetto, a plain skull cap, specifically those worn by ecclesiastics
  - Calotte (Belgium), used among students at Belgian catholic universities as a student cap
- Calotte or space-filling model used in molecule modelling
- Calotte, the anterior region (head) of a Dicyemida parasite
- a term of archaeology to indicate the part of a skull otherwise known as a skullcap

== See also ==
- Calotes, a genus of lizards
