= Student cap =

Cap worn to indicate that the wearer is a student

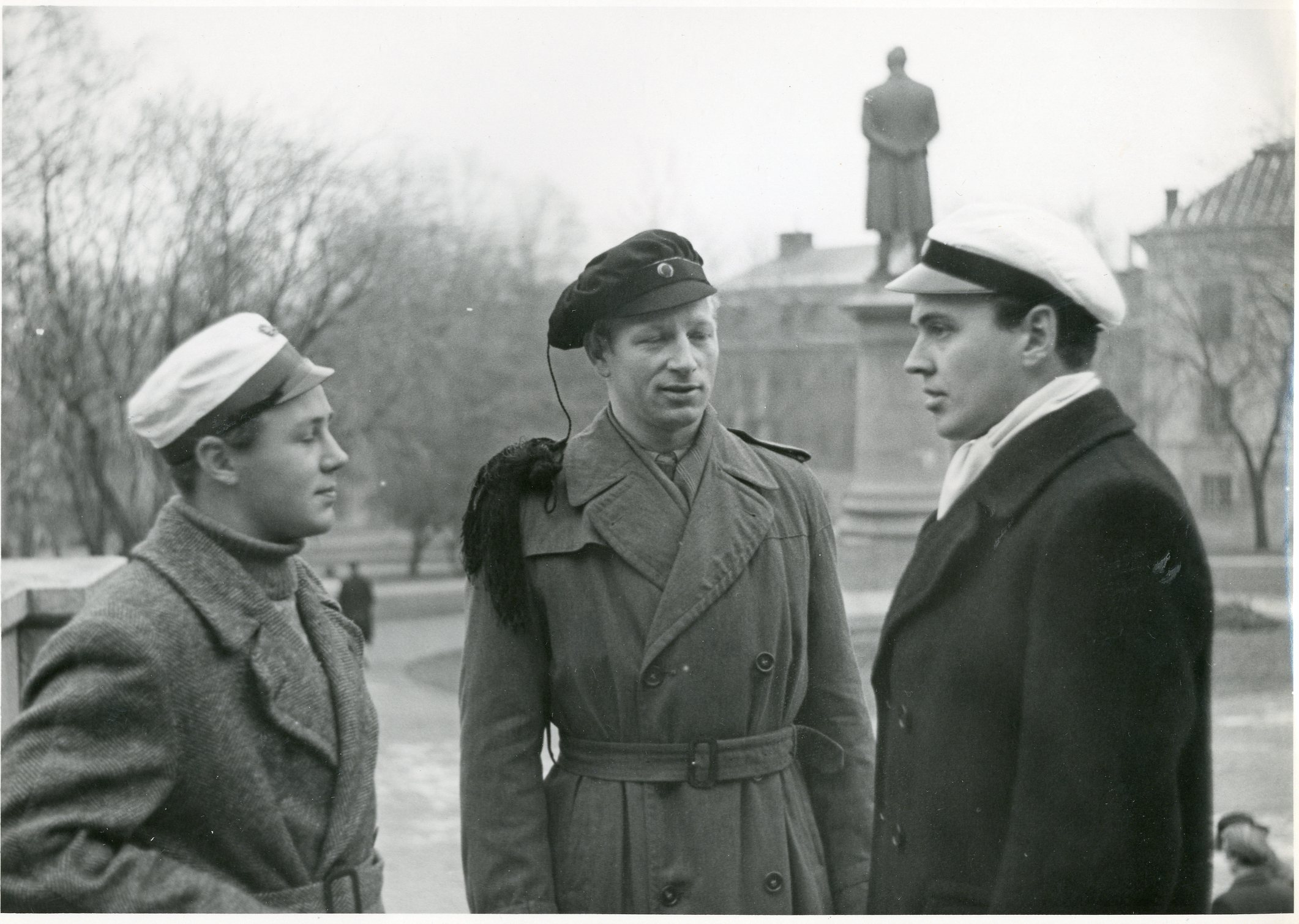
A collection of various models in 1943 (from left to right: Danish, Norwegian and Swedish).

In various European countries, student caps of different types are, or have been, worn either as a marker of a common identity, as is the case in the Nordic countries, or to identify the wearer as a member of a smaller body within the larger group of students, as is the case with the caps worn by members of German Studentenverbindungen, or student groups in Belgium.

== Belgium ==
A number of student caps have historically been worn in Belgium. The calotte is worn by students at Roman Catholic universities. The penne is worn by students at Liberal or non-Catholic universities in Brussels and Wallonia. The bierpet and clubpet are caps in the Couleur tradition.

=== Calotte ===
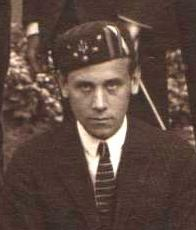
A student from the Catholic University of Leuven wearing a calotte in 1921.

The calotte originates from the skullcap worn by the Papal Zouaves around 1860.

The calotte is cylindrical, made from velvet and astrakhan (pelt of newborn lamb). The color of the top is bordeau red for the universities of Brussels, Leuven, Louvain-la-Neuve and Namur, white for the University of Ghent and emerald for the University of Liège.

In the front of the calotte are stripes representing the Belgian flag (black, yellow and red) and stripes representing the colors of the city or the university where the calotte has been received. At the back of the calotte, the faculty of the student is represented by a color and a symbol, with if needed an additional symbol to determine the speciality. Golden stars around the calotte represent the number of years that the student has studied successfully (if a year has to be retaken, a silver star will represent it). In addition to that, a number of official and personal pins will be added to the calotte, all representing something about its owner examples include:

- Official position in a student organisation (above the considered year’s star)
- Hobbies and occupations (cardplayer, partyer...)
- Character (patriotic, lazy...)

The calotte is awarded after a rite of passage called Corona (from Latin crown, for the shape of the assembly) by numerous student unions called Ordres, Cercles and Régionales to hundreds of students each year. Requirements to get the calotte vary, but always include a minimum time spent on the given campus, a knowledge of the calotte, Latin formulae and student songs.

=== Penne ===
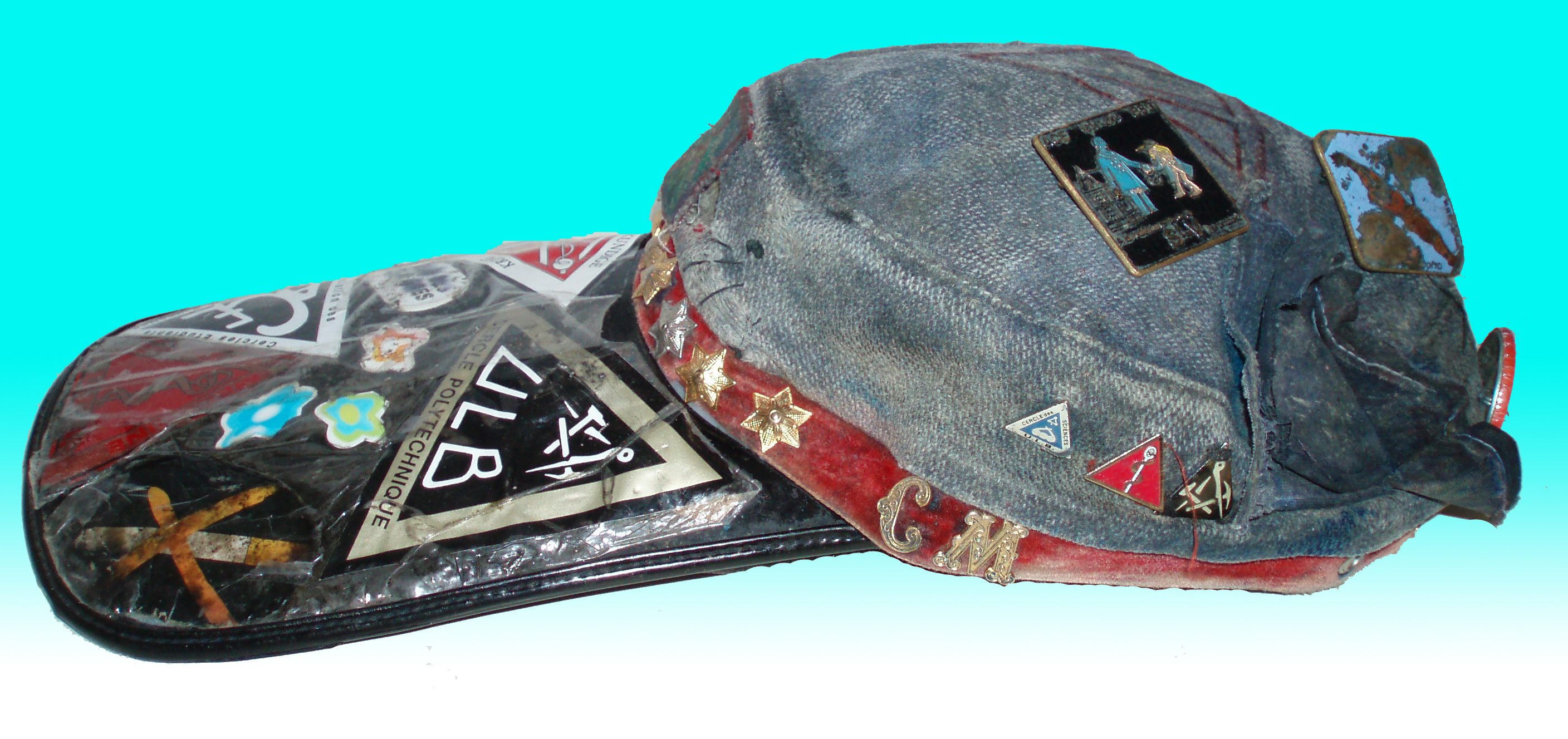
A penne from the Université libre de Bruxelles

Like the calotte, the penne ("klak" in Dutch) is awarded only after a student-organized initiation ceremony. The number of gold stars represent the number of years of study, with silver stars representing years that were failed and re-done. For years of study before the initiation (if any), the stars are not placed centrally, but instead off to the side of the head. In Brussels the colour of the band around the edge represents the faculty in which they study, with a different colour for each faculty. The hat is additionally extensively decorated as the student sees fit. At the Université libre de Bruxelles, the student's official nickname is spelled out in brass pins at the back of the rim of the hat.

== France ==
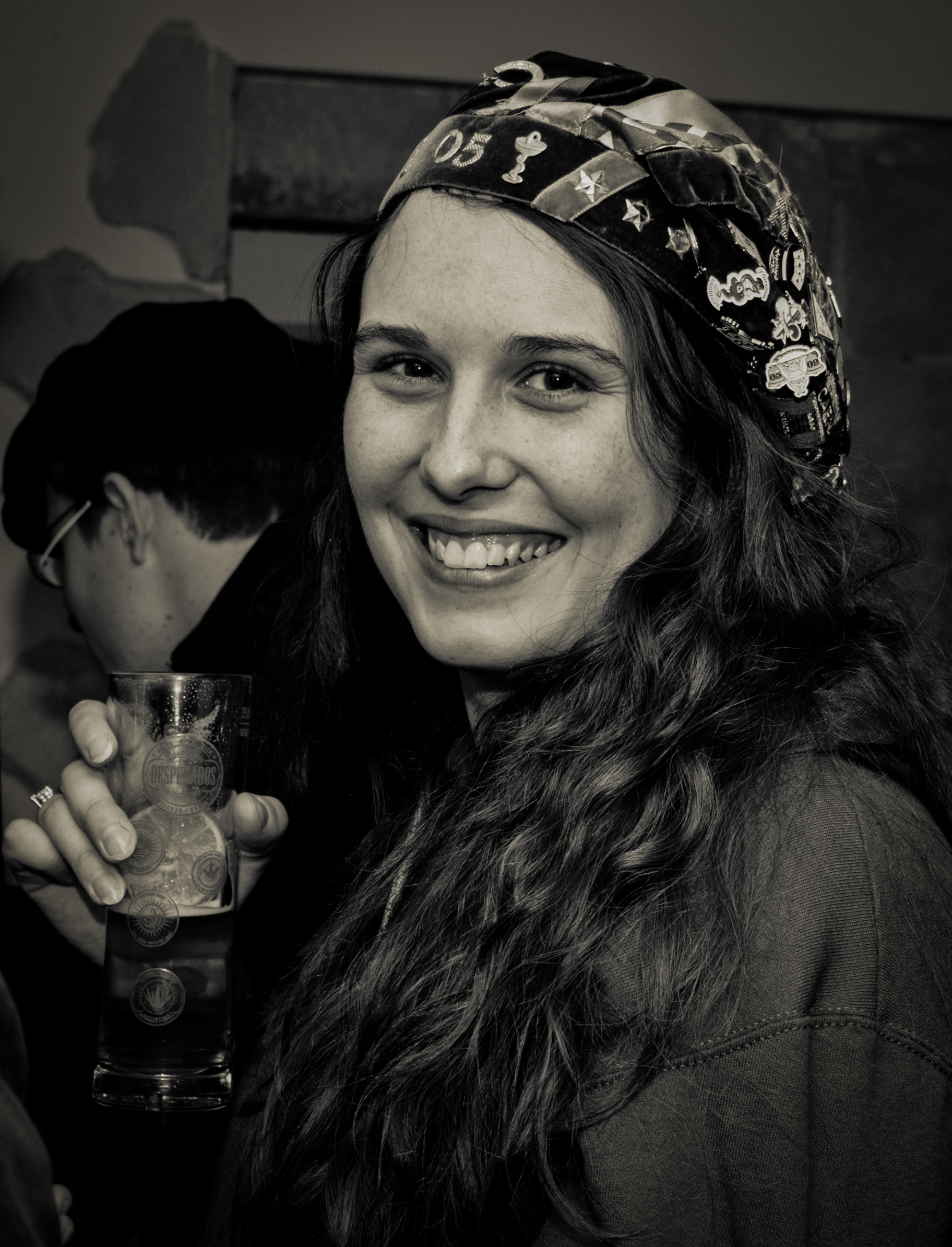
A French student wearing a faluche

In France, students have worn a black beret called a faluche since 1888.

== German-speaking countries ==
In Germany, members of student societies wear various forms of caps as part of their attire. Common types of caps are Stürmer, Tellermütze and Tönnchen.

== Nordic and Baltic countries ==
In the Nordic countries, student caps were first adopted as a common mark of recognition by the students from Uppsala University on the occasion of a Scandinavian student meeting in Copenhagen in 1845. In subsequent years, similar caps were adopted by the students at the other Swedish university (Lund) and by the students in Denmark, Norway, and Finland. Caps of the same type are known to have been used by German students since the early 18th century, and it is possible that the original impulse came from Germany.

=== Denmark ===
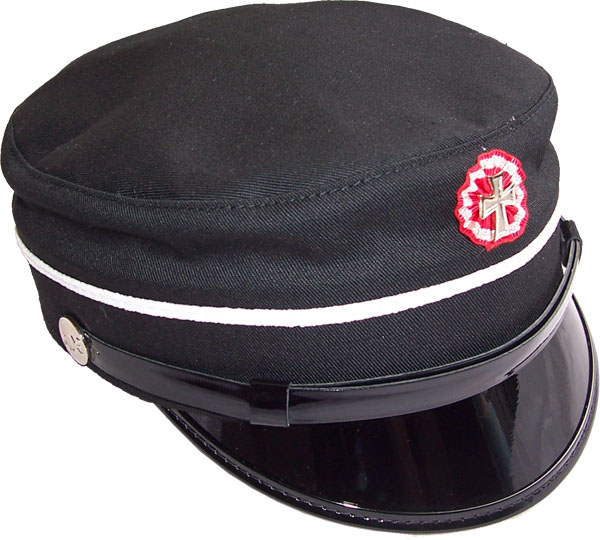
The Danish black model, used in the late 19th century

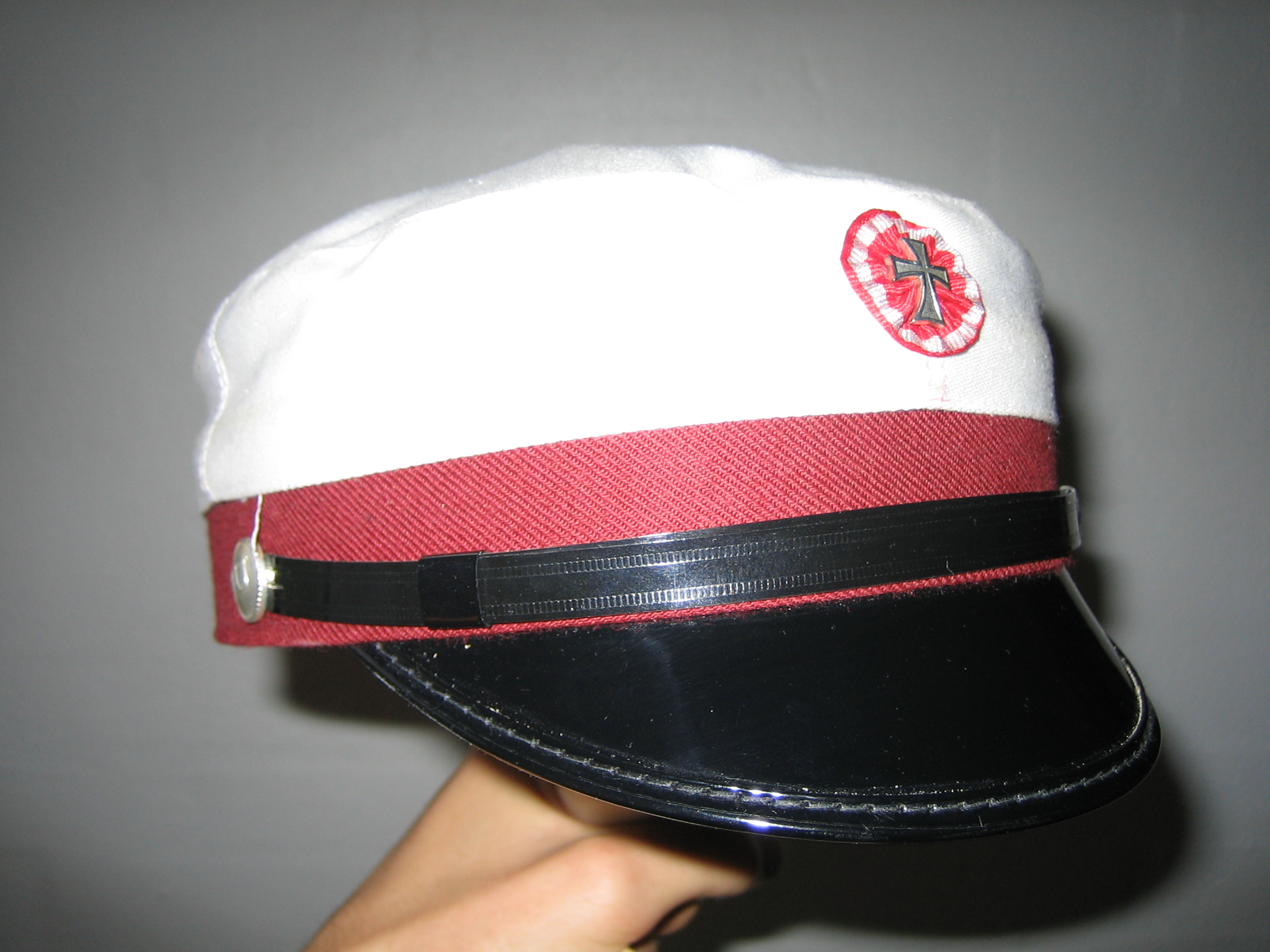
A modern Danish student cap

In Denmark, the student caps (studenterhue) are the last remains of the old school uniform of the University of Copenhagen. They came in two colours: black for the winter uniform (in the 19th century with black jacket and long black trousers) and white for the summer uniform. The caps are worn by students who have completed an upper secondary level education. The student cap is made of linen with a black brim and is supplied with a band and a red and white cockade with a badge. The band color and badge vary after which exam it represents.

When this school uniform vanished in the late 19th century, the two caps came to denote two different kinds of studentereksamen: the classical-linguistic exam with the black student’s cap and the white for the modern language and mathematical exams, both with a Bordeaux-coloured band.

When the student cap came out, it was connected only to studentereksamen (STX) which at that time was the only upper secondary level education there was, and was connected to a very high status, because very few people graduated. From the 1970s three other upper secondary level educations were made. Higher Preparatory Examination (HF), Higher Commercial Examination Programme (HHX), and Higher Technical Examination Programme (HTX). From about 1990 there has also been student caps for other educations, including 10th grade and SOSU. More variants of the caps are still being developed with special coloured cords and badges, because more educations want their own cap.

==== Traditions ====
There is a long list of traditions with the Danish student cap. They have, of course, been changed and will vary from place to place. Here are a few:

- It is bad luck to try on a student's cap before completion of the last exam. This can be counteracted by jumping over the cap backwards 3 times.
- It is traditional to write the grade given in the last exam in the middle of lining of the student's cap.
- Classmates and friends write in the lining.
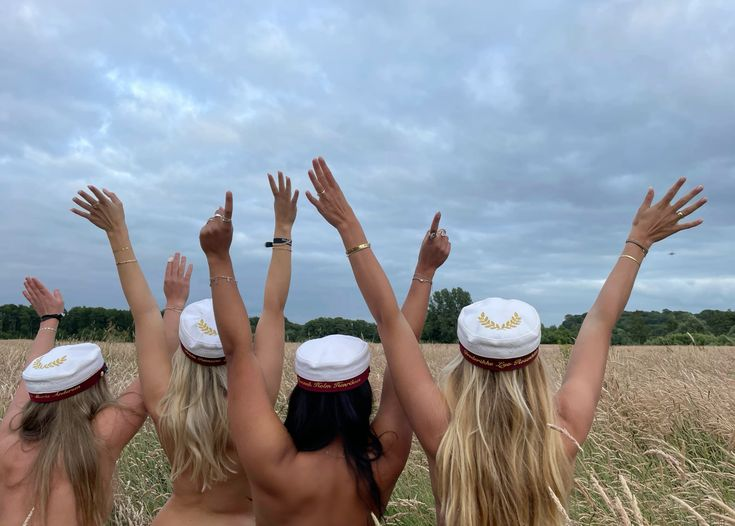
- Students wearing their caps at a farm
  The student cap can be marked with notches, cuts and so on, in connection with the "rules" of the student cap. For example, if the student sees a sunrise, they can cut a triangle on the sweatband, and if the student goes streaking in a field or farm, they can cut out a corn symbol.
- There are taunt songs connected with the rivalry between the different educations, for example between Gymnasium and HF: "There is only one cap and it's red – and if it's blue it's way too easy to get" or HTX to STX "Hvis den er rød, er den ikke mere værd end brød" (translation: "If it's red, it's not worth more than bread".

==== Upper secondary level educations with caps ====
Education	Duration	Cord	Badge
Studentereksamen (stx); STX-student (regular student)	3 years	Bordeaux	Maltese cross
Higher Preparatory Examination (HF); HF-student	2 years	Light blue	Maltese cross
Higher Commercial Examination Programme (HHX/HH); HHX-student	3 years	Blue	Caduceus
Higher Commercial Examination Programme (EUX); EUX-student	2+2 years	Black	Maltese cross
Higher Technical Examination Programme (HTX); HTX-student (technical student)	3 years	Dark blue	“HTX”
International baccalaureate (IB); IB-student (international student)	2 years	Bordeaux with international flags	Maltese cross
STX + 1-year HHX	3 years + 1 year	Bordeaux (top) and blue (bottom)	Caduceus
HF + 1-year HHX	2 years + 1 year	Light blue (top) and blue (bottom)	Caduceus
HTX plus 1-year HHX	3 years + 1 year	Dark blue (top) and blue (bottom)	Caduceus

==== Other educations with caps ====
- for folkeskole and career aimed educations

Education	Duration	Cord	Badge
10th grade (FS10)	1 year	Green	Maltese cross
Higher Commercial Examination Programme basic studies	2 out of 4 years	Dark purple	Caduceus
Farming schools Educated farmer	3½ years	Green	Maltese cross
PGU	1 year and 7½ months	Orange	Maltese cross
SOSU-helper (social and health)	1 year and 2 months	Light purple	Maltese cross
SOSU-assistant (social and health)	2 years and 10 months	Bordeaux (top) and blue (bottom)	Maltese cross
Hairdresser	4 years	Pink	Maltese cross
HTX plus 1-year HHX	4 years	Yellow	Maltese cross

The cross is not a Christian badge. It is modelled after the maltese cross of the Order of Dannebrog and thereby symbolizes the tie between the student and the state. However, students may opt for alternative badges, for example:

- Star of David for Jews
- Crescent moon for Muslims
- Maple leaf for atheists and other religious persuasions
- A red sun on a white background, for Greenlanders
- A treble clef
- A piece of a puzzle (fair trade student cap)
- Hammer and sickle for socialists and communists was available up until 2016

=== Estonia ===
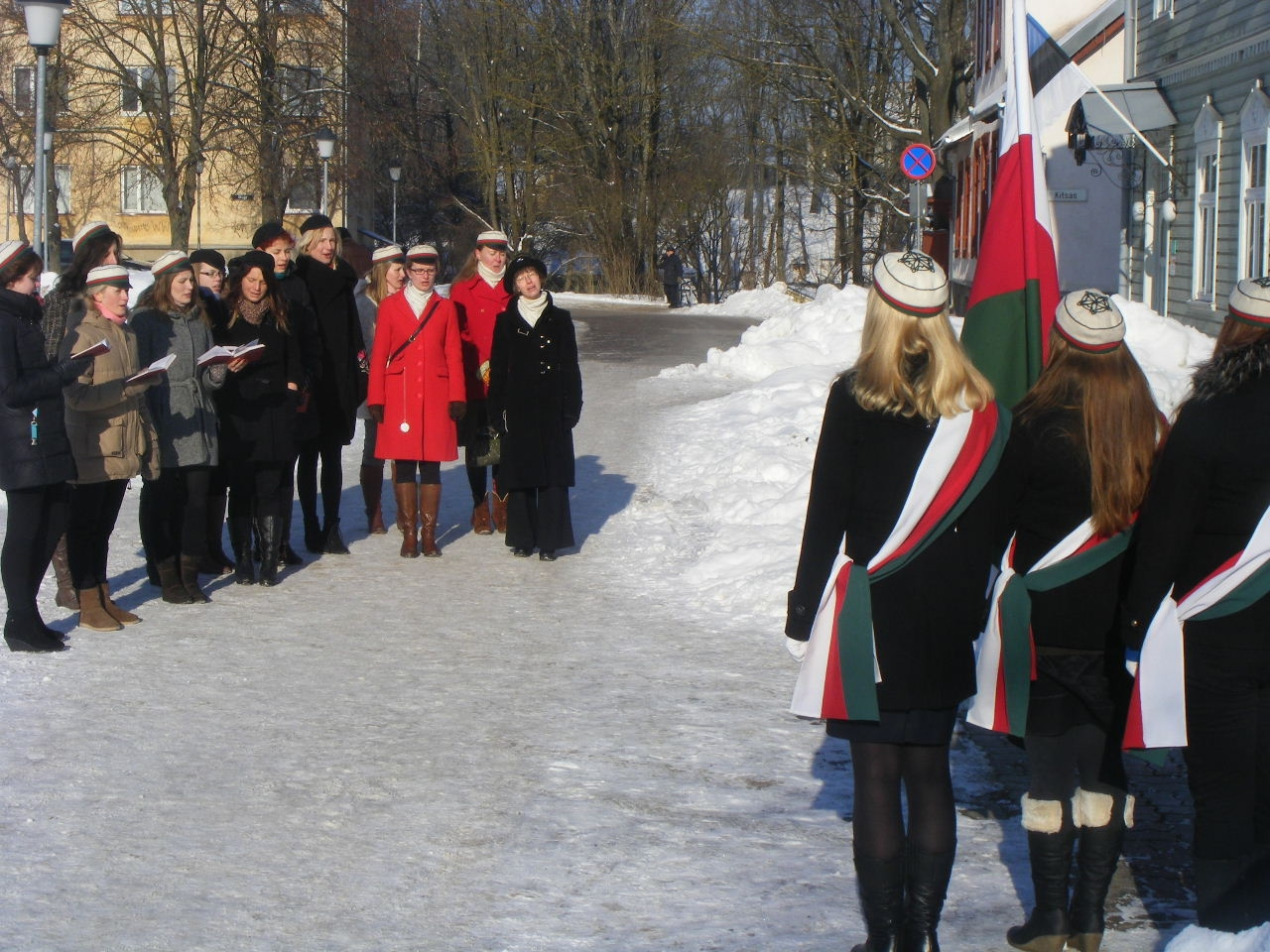
Estonian students celebrating Estonian Independence Day in 2013.

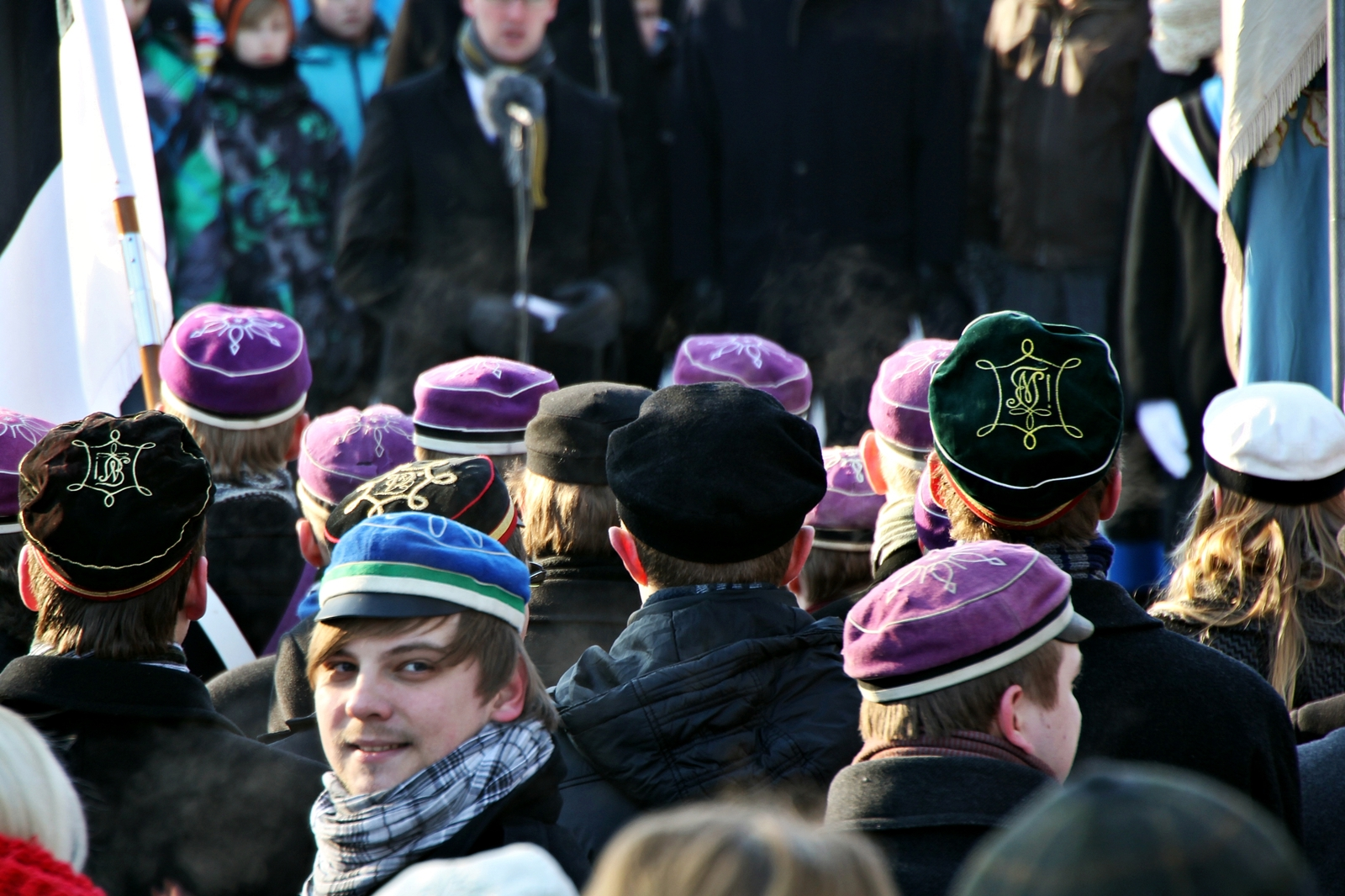
Estonian students celebrating Estonian Independence Day in 2013.

In Estonia, student caps are popular symbols of academic institutions and student organizations, and are worn not just by university students but also by school children as part of their school uniform. Most caps are made of wool felt or velvet, and have the same basic shape of a Nordic student cap or a mariner's cap with a black beak but with a different cockade, cap badge and colors, depending on the affiliation.

All students enrolled at a university are entitled to wear a standard student cap which has a white crown, a black band, and a black beak. At the front of the band is a metallic cockade depicting the temple of Apollo. The students that are members of traditional, German-type fraternities and sororities which have couleurs, generally opt to wear caps in the colors of their organizations. As most of the couleurs are tricolors, the crown of the cap is made in the "top" color of the tricolor, and the band divided horizontally in middle and bottom colors. The center of the crown is embroidered in a contrasting color with the zirkel of the organization or related symbols.

The uninitiated, novice members of fraternities and sororities wear unicolor caps, turquoise in the Estonian Students' Society, black in other corps. To distinguish between different organizations, a metal pin in the shape of a zirkel of the organization is worn on the left side of the cap band.

=== Finland ===
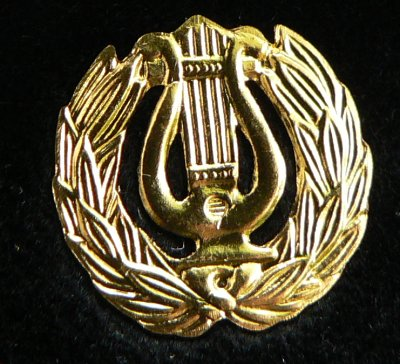
The most common cockade used in Finnish student caps.

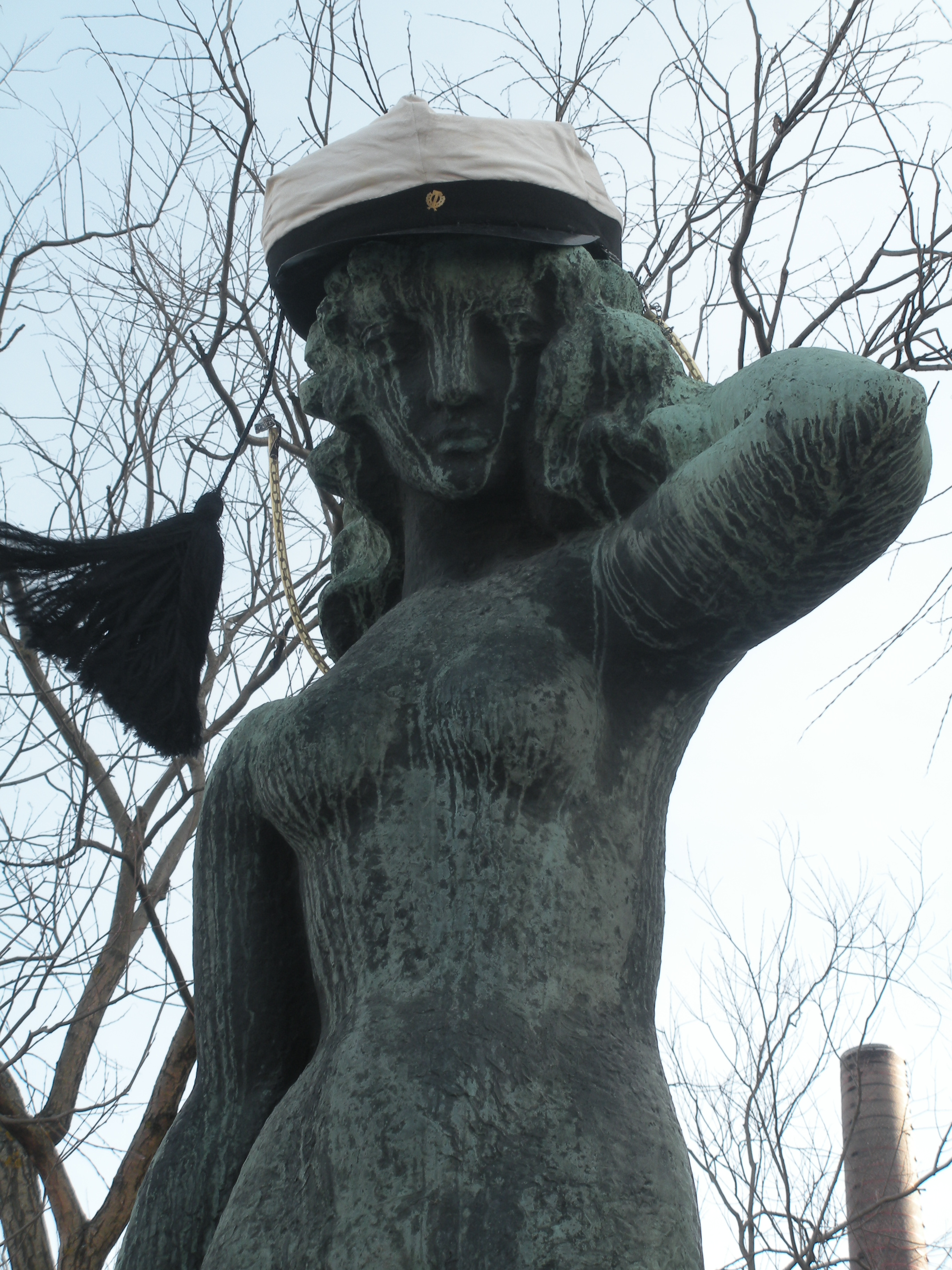
Statue on Hämeensilta bridge, Tampere, wearing an oversized student cap during May Day celebrations.

The Finnish student cap (ylioppilaslakki) is similar to the Swedish model. The Finnish student cap has an appearance similar to the Swedish version, but instead of coloured fabric cockade, it has a metallic, gold-colored cockade depicting the lyre of Apollo, the insignia of the University of Helsinki. The cap was introduced in its present form in the 1870s. Until the 1950s, the university students usually wore the cap during the whole summer holiday of the university, from Walpurgis Night till the end of September. Nowadays, the cap is used mostly during 1 May and in academic ceremonies and occasions. The cap is worn by all Finnish high school (lukio) graduates who have completed the Finnish matriculation examination.

Until 1917, the matriculation examination was the entrance exam of the University of Helsinki, which meant that all high-school graduates were, at least formally, students of the University of Helsinki. In memory of that period, all new student cap have the cockade of the student union of the University of Helsinki. In many Finnish universities, the student union recommends that the students change the cockade to a university-specific one.

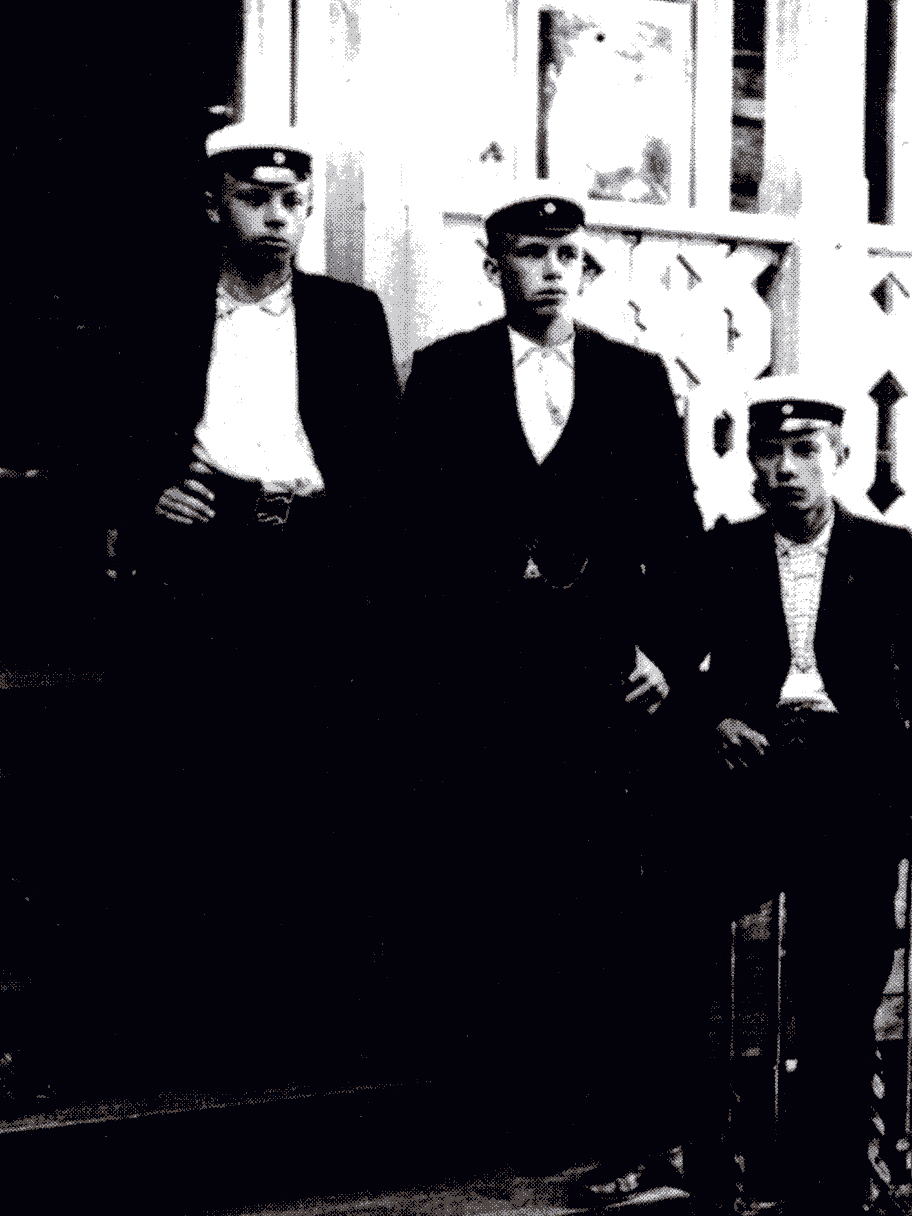
Gunnar Nordström (on the left) with two other high school graduates wearing students caps in about 1900.

In the late 19th century, the language strife between Swedish- and Finnish-speakers divided the Finnish academia. The size of the cockade was used to signal the student's opinion to the language question: the Swedish-speaking students wore a cockade with a diameter of 22 mm, moderate Finnish-speakers a 16 mm cockade and radical Finnish-speakers a 14 mm cockade. Even today, the Swedish-speakers use the 22 mm cockade, while the graduates of Finnish-speaking high schools use a 16 mm cockade.

The lining, i.e. the inside, of the cap symbolizes the regional identity of the graduate. Especially in earlier days, the students usually choose the lining to have the colours of their own student nations. Nowadays, the most typical lining is the white and blue, symbolizing common patriotism. However, the Swedish-speaking students usually wear red and yellow, or blue, yellow and white, while in Satakunta and North Karelia, the regional colours are still popular. The Swedish-speaking students in Ostrobothnia use black, yellow and red.

As in Sweden, the students of engineering usually wear a special student cap (Finnish: teekkarilakki) with a long tassel. However, unlike in Sweden, the crown of the Finnish Engineering student cap is always white and the cap has a gold-coloured, university-specific cockade, except in University of Oulu, where the cockade is program specific. The tassel is always black and worn without any additions. The lining of the engineering caps is dark red, symbolizing the social change brought about by the ever-advancing technology, except in Lappeenranta University of Technology, where Karelian colours, red and black, are used, in University of Oulu, where the student cap has a blue lining, and in the cap of Teknologföreningen, the Swedish-speaking student nation at the Aalto University, with a red-yellow-red lining. The Engineering student caps are worn by present engineering students and graduate engineers as a summer hat starting at midnight on the 1st of May and over the summer.

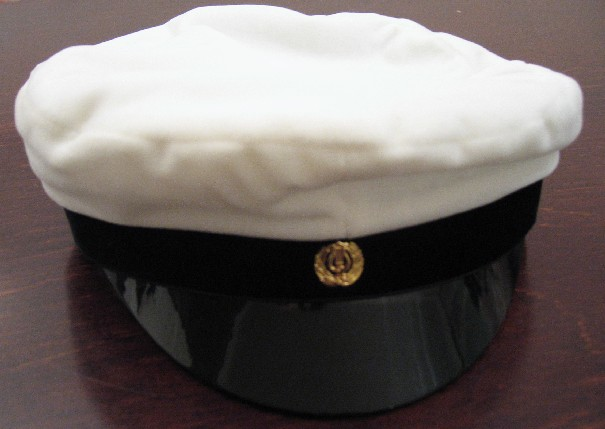
A Finnish student cap, the most common model

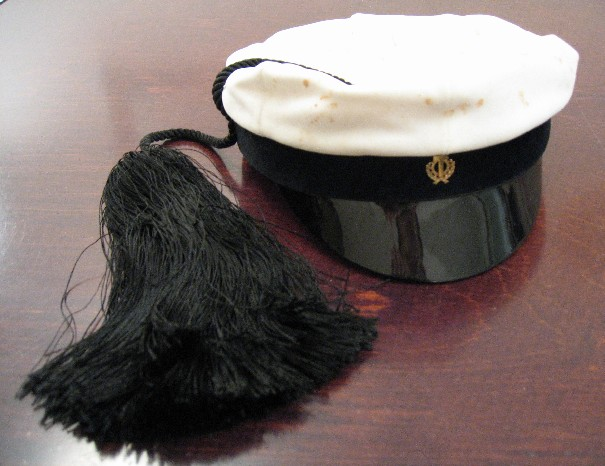
The cap of an engineering student at the Tampere University of Technology.

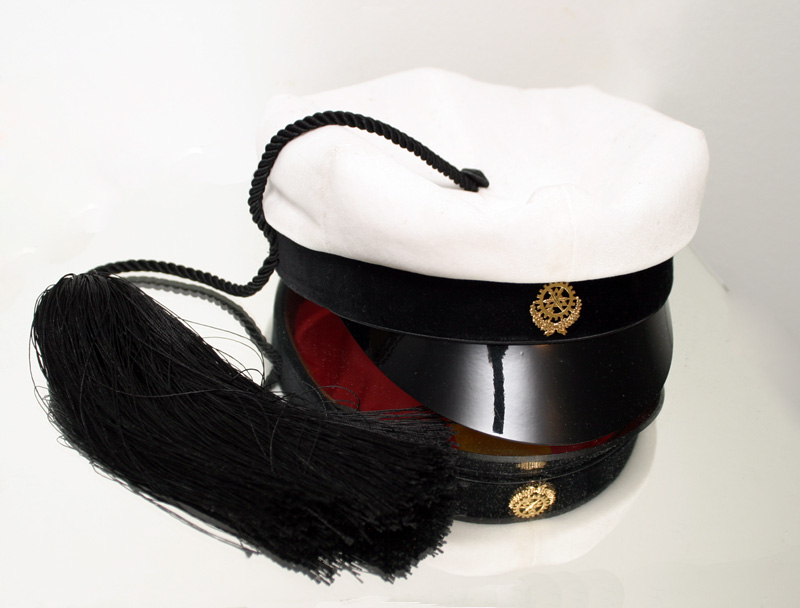
Technology student's cap of a Swedish-speaking student at the Aalto University, the slightly larger cockade is noticeable.

=== Iceland ===
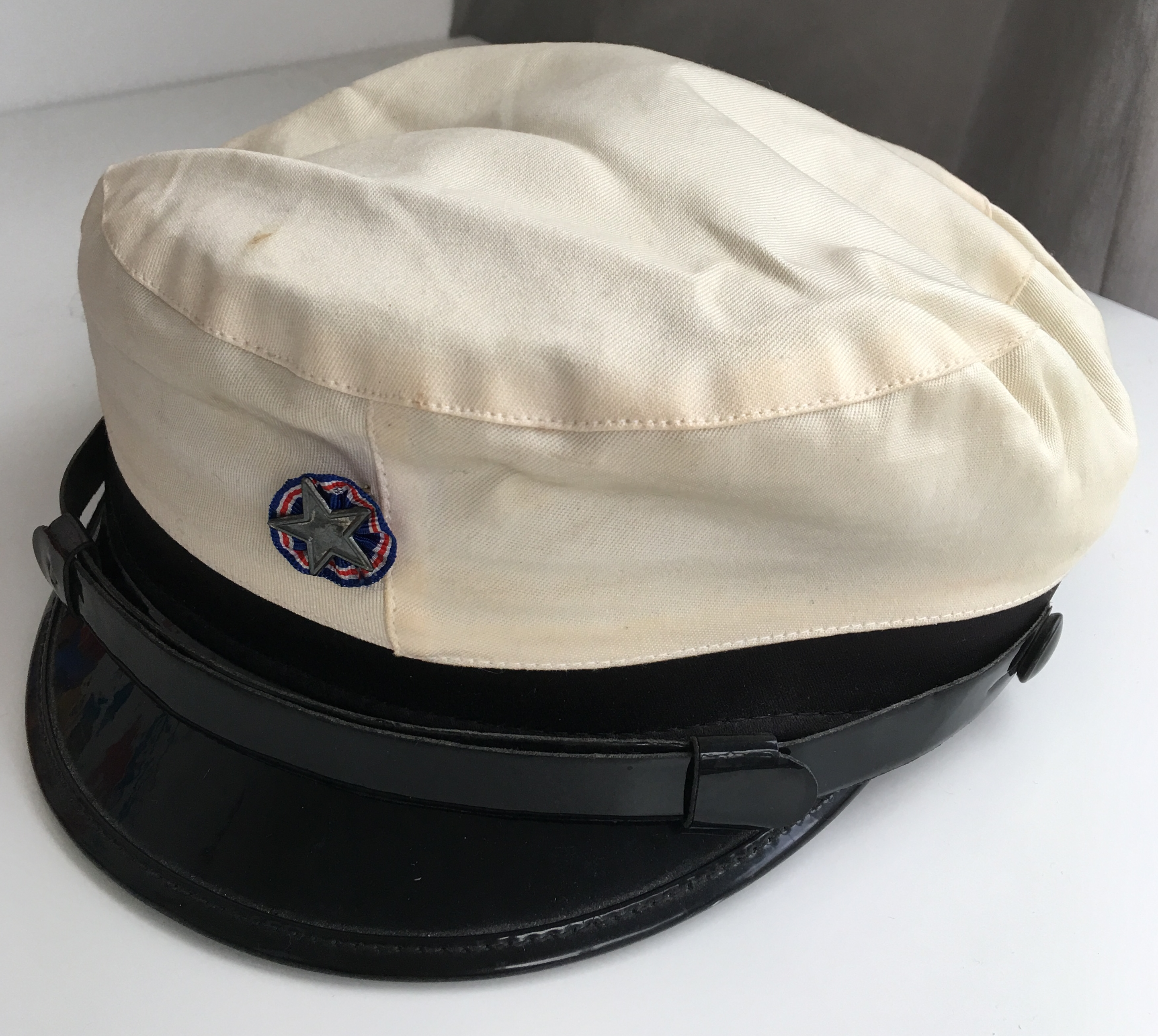
Icelandic student cap from 1991.

At each high-school and or junior college ceremonial graduation the graduating students are allowed to wear their student caps for the first time. Know simply as “stúdentshúfa”, the Icelandic student caps have mostly the same shape and colour as the other traditional Nordic student caps of Sweden and Denmark, they however tend to have a slightly tighter fit and appear somewhat stiffer and more defined in shape.

It has a white crown, a black band and a black peak. At the front of the band is a silver star.

One of the caps distinctive traits is the possibility of removing the top white crown, which in return reveals a black version of the cap's crown. This is due to the Icelandic tradition dictating that after an entire year as a graduate and after finishing a year of university education the student should remove the white cover-piece, signifying their academic status as a university student. This practice has its roots in the traditions concerning the black caps of the Danish students. During the year the cap is white, the student is known as a nýstúdent (new student).

The first Icelandic students to wear these caps were graduates of Menntaskólinn í Reykjavík (Reykjavík College). In modern times different versions have been introduced. These caps often have different coloured crowns which differ from the traditional white coloured crown. This is done in order to allow students which graduate at secondary level from schools specialising in academic trade- industry- and/or craftmen-programs (iðnskóli). The colours of these crowns are often red or green.

=== Norway ===
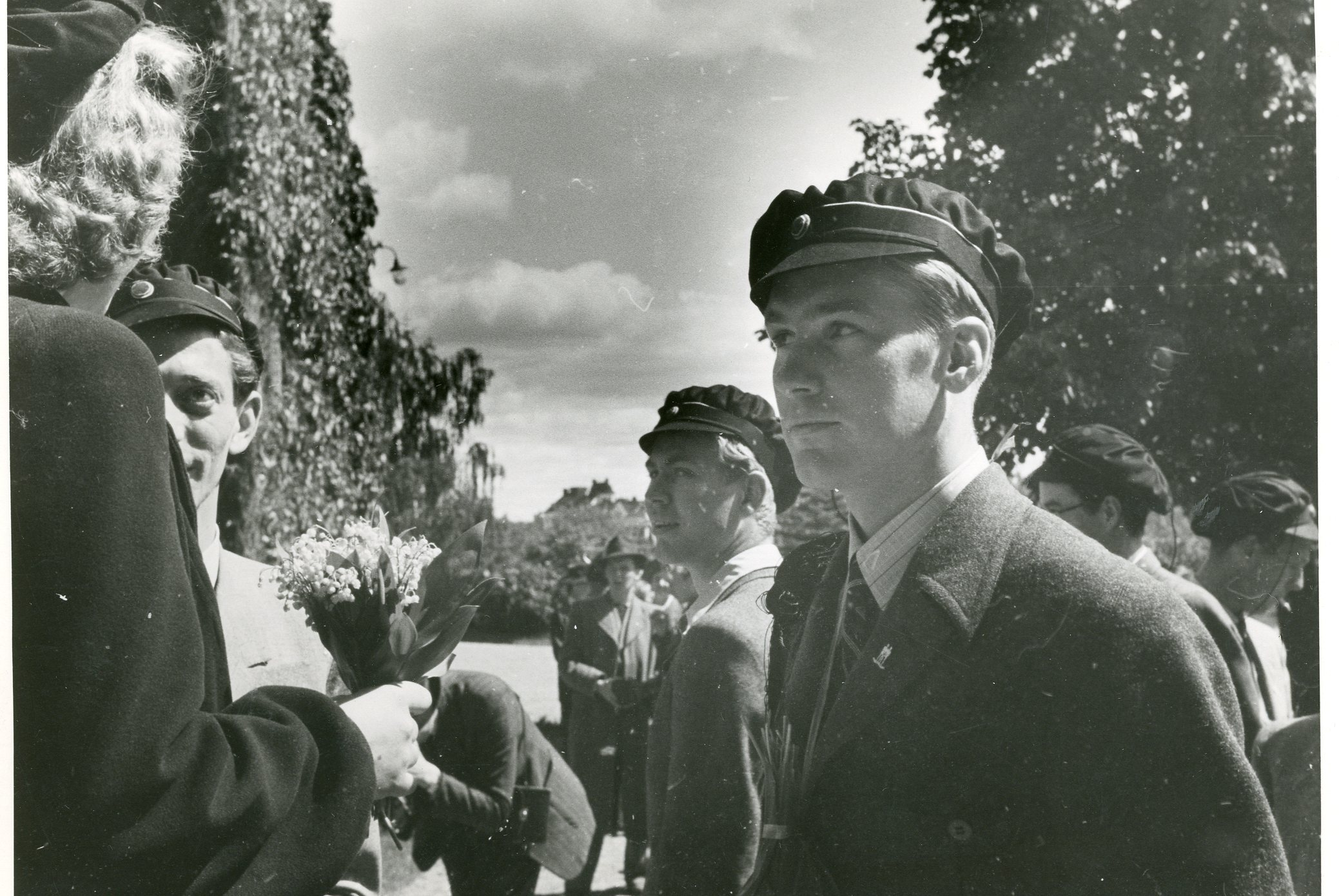
Norwegian students wearing their student caps after graduation from Uppsala University in Sweden, 1942.

The Norwegian student cap (Studenterlue or Duskelue), is mostly made of black velvet with the old Apollo symbol on the forehead (the symbol of the old University of Oslo). The tassel is made from silk. Norwegian students got their caps on graduation, after throwing away the red russelue, made after a similar principle. After 1968, the use of this cap has been less and less frequent, but may be seen on Norwegian Constitution Day, mostly worn by old academics.

This cap came into use after 1850.

=== Sweden ===
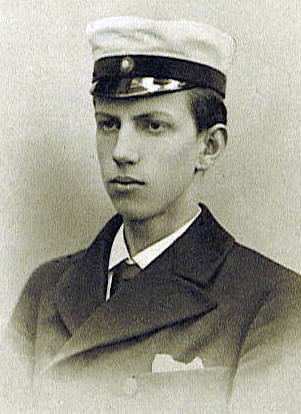
Zeth Höglund, wearing his student cap, graduating from a Gymnasium in Gothenburg 1902

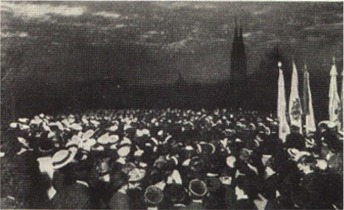
A large crowd, mostly students in typical Swedish white student caps, participating in the traditional Walpurgis Night celebration with song outside the Castle in Uppsala. The silhouette of the cathedral towers may be seen in the background. To the right are banners and standards of the student nations. Image from c. 1920.

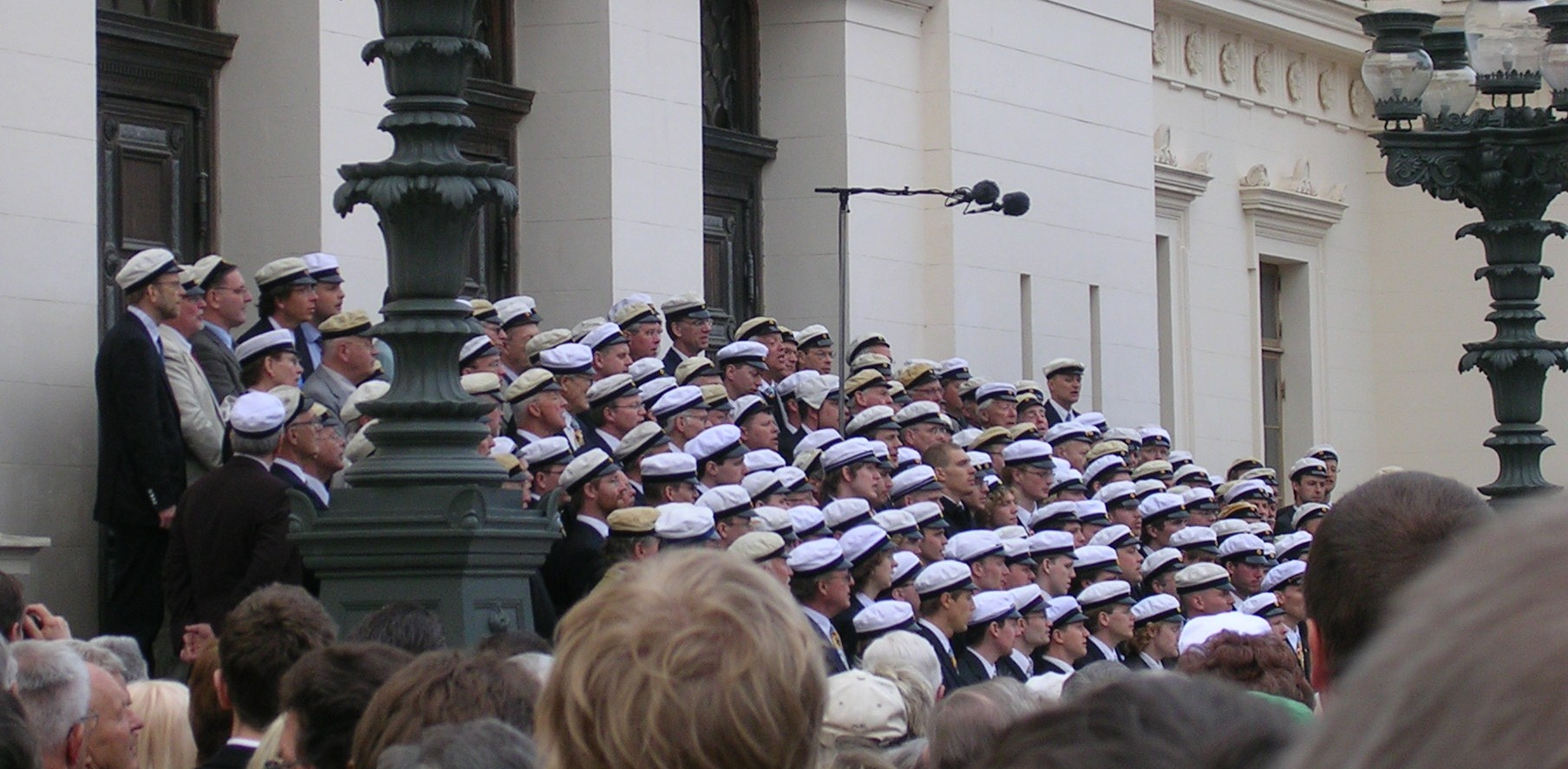
The Lund University Male Voice Choir, wearing white student caps, singing on the stairs of the Lund University main building on the first of May 2005.

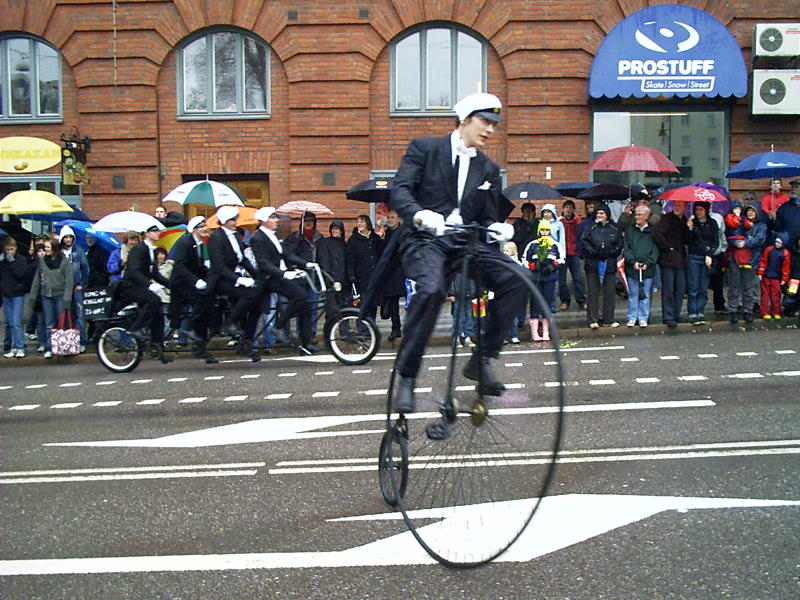
Students of Chalmers University of Technology in Gothenburg, Sweden, riding a penny-farthing and a quadruplet bicycle with student caps, during the Chalmers Cortège of 2006.

The Swedish student cap (studentmössa), used since the mid-19th century by high school (Gymnasium) graduates, normally has a white crown, a black (or dark blue) band, and a black peak. At the front of the band is a cockade of blue and yellow, the colours of the Swedish flag.

Swedish student caps traditionally come in two main variants, named after the two universities in existence at the time of their original adoption. The Uppsala cap has a black band, blue and yellow lining, and a somewhat soft crown. The Lund cap has a dark blue band, red lining, and a stiffer crown. The earliest student cap known to have been preserved, a mid-19th century Uppsala cap in the collections of the Nordic Museum but currently exhibited at the Uppland Provincial Museum (in Uppsala), is considerably softer and looser in style than the modern or even late 19th century caps.

The Uppsala cap was traditionally worn only in summer, from Walpurgis Night until the end of September. In Lund, the white cap was also donned at Walpurgis and taken off in the fall, but students could exchange it for a winter variant with a dark blue crown during the rest of the year. Nowadays, the winter cap is usually replaced by a winter cover on the white cap.

A major variation on the student cap is the one worn by engineering students, the teknologmössa, which has the same basic shape as the regular student cap but has a triangular flap hanging down on the right side ending in a tassel. The caps worn by engineering students usually come in colours signalling the university of origin (e.g. white=Chalmers University of Technology in Gothenburg, wine red=Luleå University of Technology). The tasseled cap originated at the Chalmers University of Technology in Gothenburg, where it was first introduced in 1879, and is influenced by the Norwegian student cap, the duskelue, which from 1856 had a tassel; during the period of the Swedish-Norwegian union (until 1905) a large number of Norwegian students studied at Chalmers. It later spread to the Royal Institute of Technology and the other Swedish engineering schools.

Originally associated with completion of the studentexamen, the entrance examination to the universities, which was at the time of the original adoption of student caps always taken at the universities, the cap followed the studentexamen to the secondary schools when these took over the final examination of their students in 1864. After this point it was donned upon graduation by everyone who completed the studentexamen, whether they continued to university or not.

As the studentexamen in reality remained reserved for boys (and later girls) from the bourgeoisie, a very large proportion of whom did enroll at university, the conversion of the cap to a form of secondary school graduation cap did not in fact result in the cap losing its association with university students. To some extent this happened later, through the combination of two factors: firstly, the radicalism of the 1960s and 1970s, which influenced many students to stop using their caps (regarded as a sign of belonging to the bourgeoisie) or even burn them publicly. Secondly, the simultaneous (1968) reform of the secondary school system, through the abolition of the studentexamen and the introduction of a large number of secondary school programmes, many of which were vocational in character and not intended to prepare for higher studies but all frequently co-existing in the same schools.

The large number of new programmes introduced after 1970 also led to a proliferation of new types of student caps, such as the one with a red band (instead of the black or dark blue band of the traditional caps) used by students completing the two-year vocational programmes. With the caps now being used upon graduation by almost all secondary school students, many of the caps have become to be more strongly associated with the secondary school and the coming of age rather than with the common identity as a Swedish student, as had originally been intended. Recent developments in the graduation hats has differentiated these hats further, such as with the introduction as personalized embroideries, linings and colouring to signify the student’s programme, place of education and origin. Currently in Sweden there are a lot of companies that provide personalized student caps, clothing, graduation caps etc. Many of these companies have tie ups with the universities to provide the respective caps regularly.

== See also ==
- List of hat styles
- Square academic cap, similar object in Anglosaxon countries, used both by students and graduates
- Doctoral hat, hat used in Nordic countries by holders of a doctorate
- Media related to Student caps at Wikimedia Commons
