= University of Poitiers =

Public university in Poitiers, France

Coordinates: 46°35′10″N 0°20′38″E

- Université de Poitiers
- Motto: Des savoirs & des talents Knowledges and talents
- Type: Public
- Established: 1431; 595 years ago
- Affiliations: Coimbra Group, IRUN
- Budget: 272 680 000 Euro (2016)
- President: Virginie Laval
- Administrative staff: 2,300
- Students: 25,078 (2016)
- Location: Poitiers, France
- Campus: University town
- Colors: Red
- Website: www.univ-poitiers.fr

The University of Poitiers (UP; French: Université de Poitiers, pronounced [ynivɛʁsite də pwatje]) is a public university located in Poitiers, France. It is a member of the Coimbra Group. It is multidisciplinary and contributes to making Poitiers the city with the highest student/inhabitant ratio in France by welcoming nearly 28,000 students in 2017.

The University of Poitiers represents a global operating budget of around 150 million euros per year, one-third of which is for operating and investment costs and two-thirds for personnel costs. As of July 2015 it is a member of the regional university association Leonardo da Vinci consolidated University.

== History ==
Founded in 1431 by Pope Eugene IV and chartered by King Charles VII, the University of Poitiers was originally composed of five faculties: theology, canon law, civil law, medicine, and arts.

In the 16th century, the university exerted its influence over the town cultural life, and was ranked second only to Paris. Of the 4,000 students who attended it at the time, some were to become famous: Joachim Du Bellay, Jean-Louis Guez de Balzac, François Rabelais, René Descartes, and Scévole de Sainte-Marthe, to name but a few.

After temporary closure during the French Revolution when provincial universities were abolished, the University of Poitiers reopened in 1796. The reinstated university was merged from several schools and contained new faculties such as the faculty of science and the faculty of letters.

They established the École nationale supérieure d'ingénieurs de Poitiers, a department which trains engineers, in 1984 after having created the Institut de sciences et techniques de Poitiers, its predecessor.

The first Confucius Institute in France was created on the campus in 2005 with the cooperation of Nanchang University and Jiujiang University.

After having managed its payroll and budget since 1 January 2010, the University of Poitiers is the third university in France to have its premises.

In late 2011 the university changed its logo. They submitted four so that students and the staff were able to decide. The up-to-date logo is based on the original coat of arms while the former was something modern. Over 9,000 people participated in the selection of the new logo.

In 2012, the university launched a blogging platform where the teaching staff and researchers deal with topical subjects, each in their area of expertise. The slogan is the word of experts.

== Organization ==
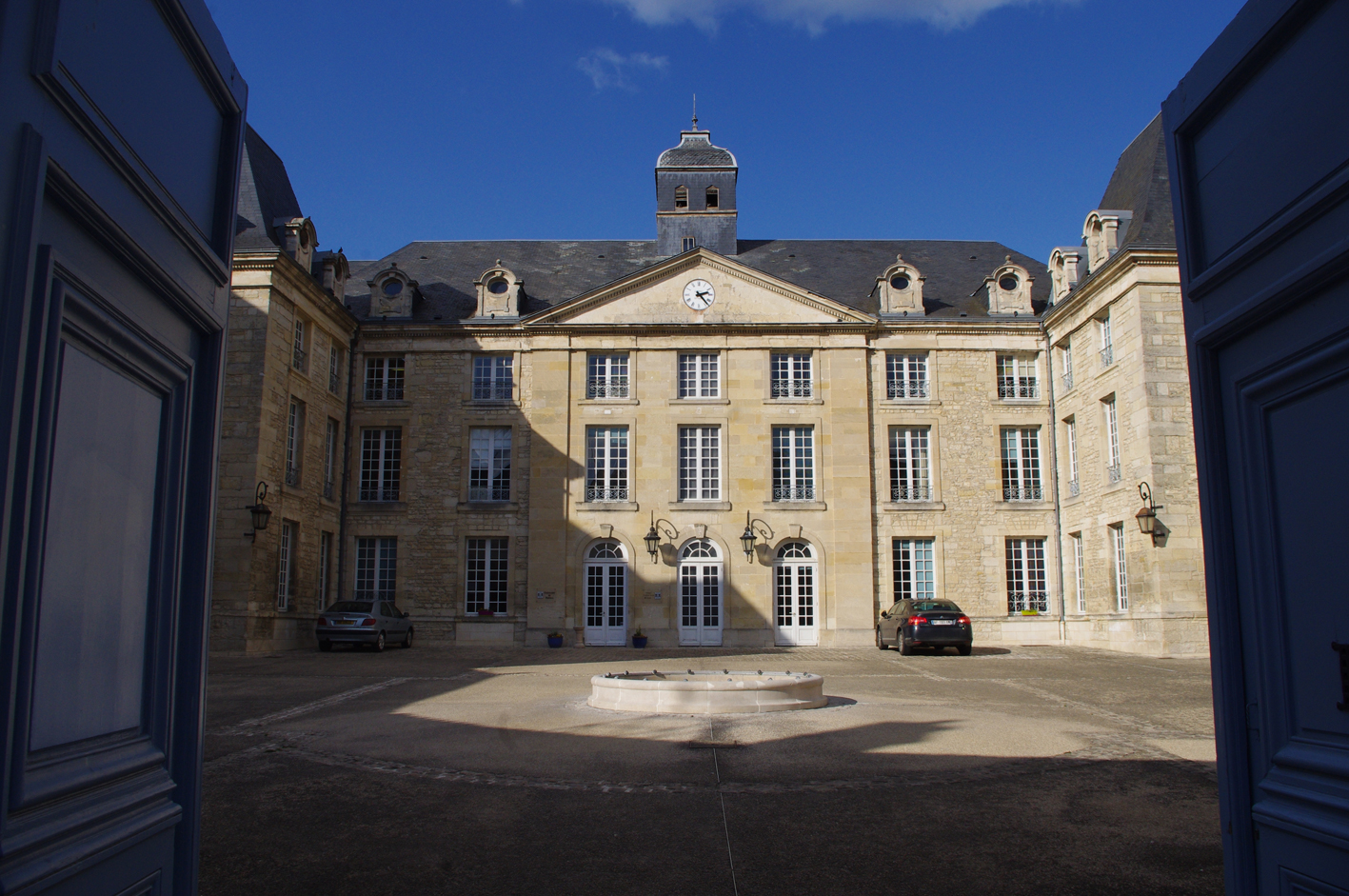
The headquarters of the university of Poitiers in the city center

The university covers all major academic fields through its 14 teaching and research departments, institutes, and schools:

- Teaching and Research Departments
  - Department of Law and Social Sciences
  - Department of Economics
  - Department of Basic and Applied Science
  - Department of Literature and Languages
  - Department of Human Sciences and Arts
  - Department of Sports Sciences
  - Department of Medicine and Pharmacy
- School
  - Graduate Engineering School - École nationale supérieure d'ingénieurs de Poitiers (ENSIP)
- Institutes
  - Polytechnic of Poitiers (IUT)
  - Polytechnic of Angoulême (IUT)
  - IAE University Business School (IAE Poitiers)
  - Institute of Communication and New Technologies (ICOMTEC)
  - General Administration Preparatory Institute (IPAG)
  - Institute of Industrial, Insurance and Financial Risks (IRIAF)

== Research ==
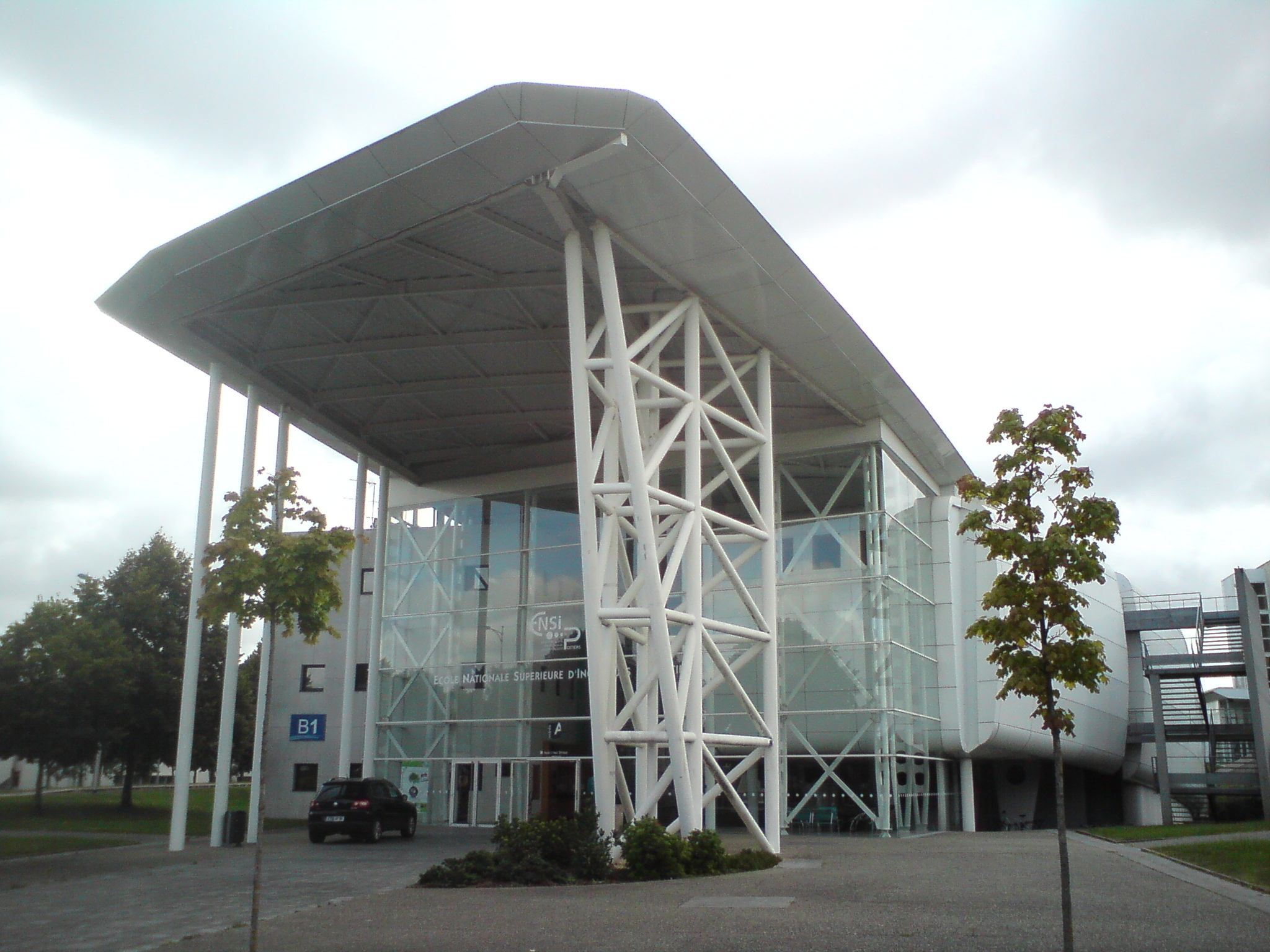
The building of ENSI Poitiers in the center of the campus, at the East of Poitiers

In the scientific domain, it has these laboratories, where ENSIP is part of:

- LIAS: automatics
- IC2MP: chemistry and materials
- Institut Pprime: physics

In the legal domain, the Center for Studies on International Legal Cooperation (CECOJI) is a joint research unit (UMR) involving the University of Poitiers and the National Center for Scientific Research (CNRS).

== Life on campus ==
Students can play in athletic teams, or just enjoy all the sports proposed. It is also possible to play golf at the north of the campus of Poitiers and sail in La Rochelle.

The Bitards are also known as the university's most famous student association.

== Notable people ==
=== Medieval ===
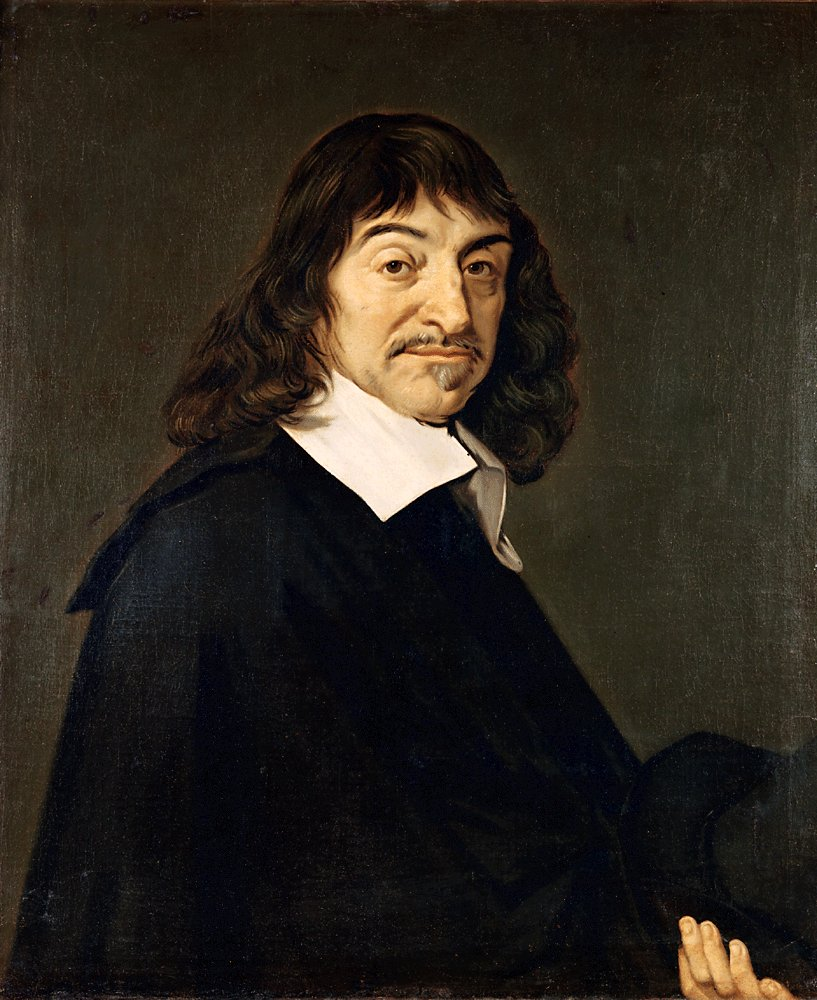
René Descartes

- Johann Reuchlin (1455-1522) - Greek and Hebrew scholar
- François Rabelais (c.1490-1553) - writer
- Hubert Languet (1518-1581) - diplomat
- Joachim du Bellay (c.1522-1560) - poet, critic
- Pierre de Ronsard (1524-1585) - poet
- François Viète (1540-1603) - mathematician
- Robert Hayman (1575-1629) - poet and colonist
- Andrew Melville (1545-1622) - theologian
- Georg Anton von Rodenstein (1579-1652) - bishop
- René Descartes (1596-1650) - philosopher
- Joseph-François Lafitau (1681-1746) - Jesuit missionary, ethnologist, and naturalist

=== Modern ===
==== Humanities ====
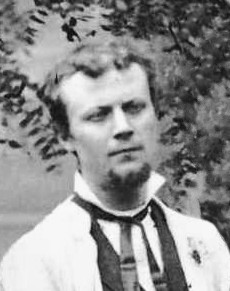
Alfred Jeanroy

- Georges Vacher de Lapouge (1854-1936) - anthropologist
- Alfred Jeanroy (1859-1953) - linguist
- José Fernández Montesinos (1897-1972) - historian and literary critic
- Emmanuel Levinas (1906-1995) - philosopher
- Edmond-René Labande (1908-1992) - archivist and historian
- Mikel Dufrenne (1910-1995) - philosopher
- Roger Garaudy (1913-2012) - philosopher
- John Howard Griffin (1920-1980) - American journalist and author
- Jean Foyer (1921-2008) - lawyer and politician
- Pierre Bec (1921-2014) - poet and linguist
- Michel Clouscard (1928-2009) - philosopher and sociologist
- Jean-Claude Coquet (1928-2023) - linguist and semiotician
- Samir Amin (1931-2018) - economist
- Kweku Etrew Amua-Sekyi (1933-2007) - Ghanaian Supreme Court Judge
- Claude Hagège (b. 1936) - linguist
- Joaquim Chissano (b. 1939) - Mozambican politician
- Pascal Salin (b. 1939) - economist
- Pascoal Mocumbi (1941-2023) - Mozambican politician
- Jean-Pierre Arrignon (1943-2021) - historian
- Jean-Luc Marion (b. 1946) - philosopher
- François-Bernard Huyghe (1951-2022) - political scientist
- Pascale Ballet (b. 1953) - Egyptologist

==== Science ====
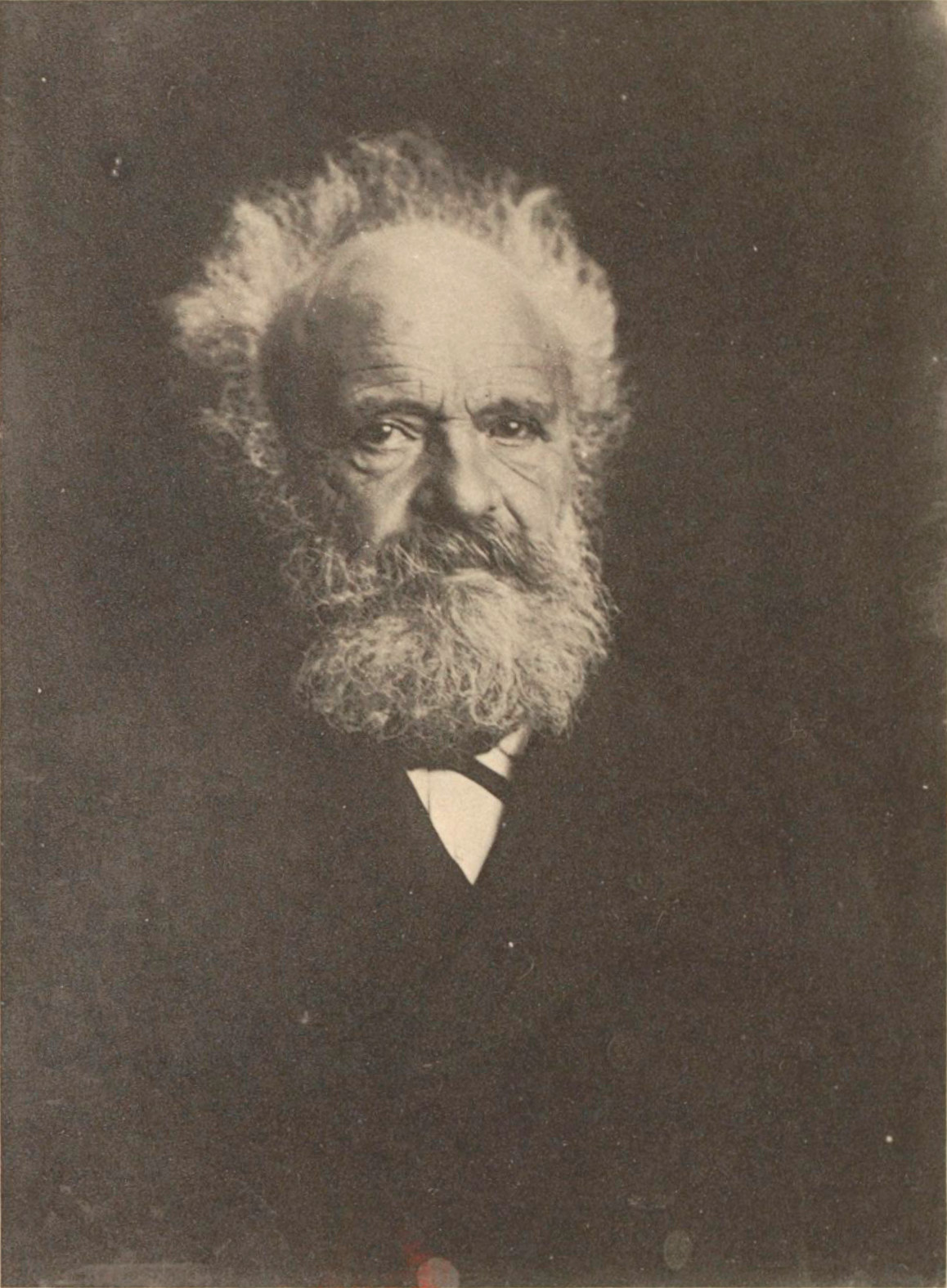
Jules Gosselet

- Jules Gosselet (1832-1916) - geologist
- Édouard Louis Trouessart (1842-1927) - zoologist
- Noël Bernard (1874-1911) - botanist
- Henri Lebesgue (1875-1941) - mathematician
- René Maurice Fréchet (1878-1973) - mathematician
- Paul Becquerel (1879-1955) - biologist
- Albert Maige (1872-1943) - botanist
- Michel Lazard (1924-1987) - mathematician
- Michel Brunet (b. 1940) - paleontologist
- Mostafa Mir-Salim (b. 1947) - engineer
- Abderrazak El Albani - sedimentologist

== Points of interest ==
- Jardin botanique universitaire de Poitiers

== See also ==
- Bitard
- List of medieval universities
