= Faluche =

Traditional cap worn by students in France

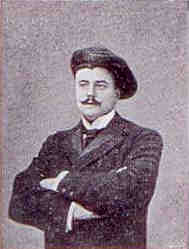
Faluchard in 1898, with his faluche.

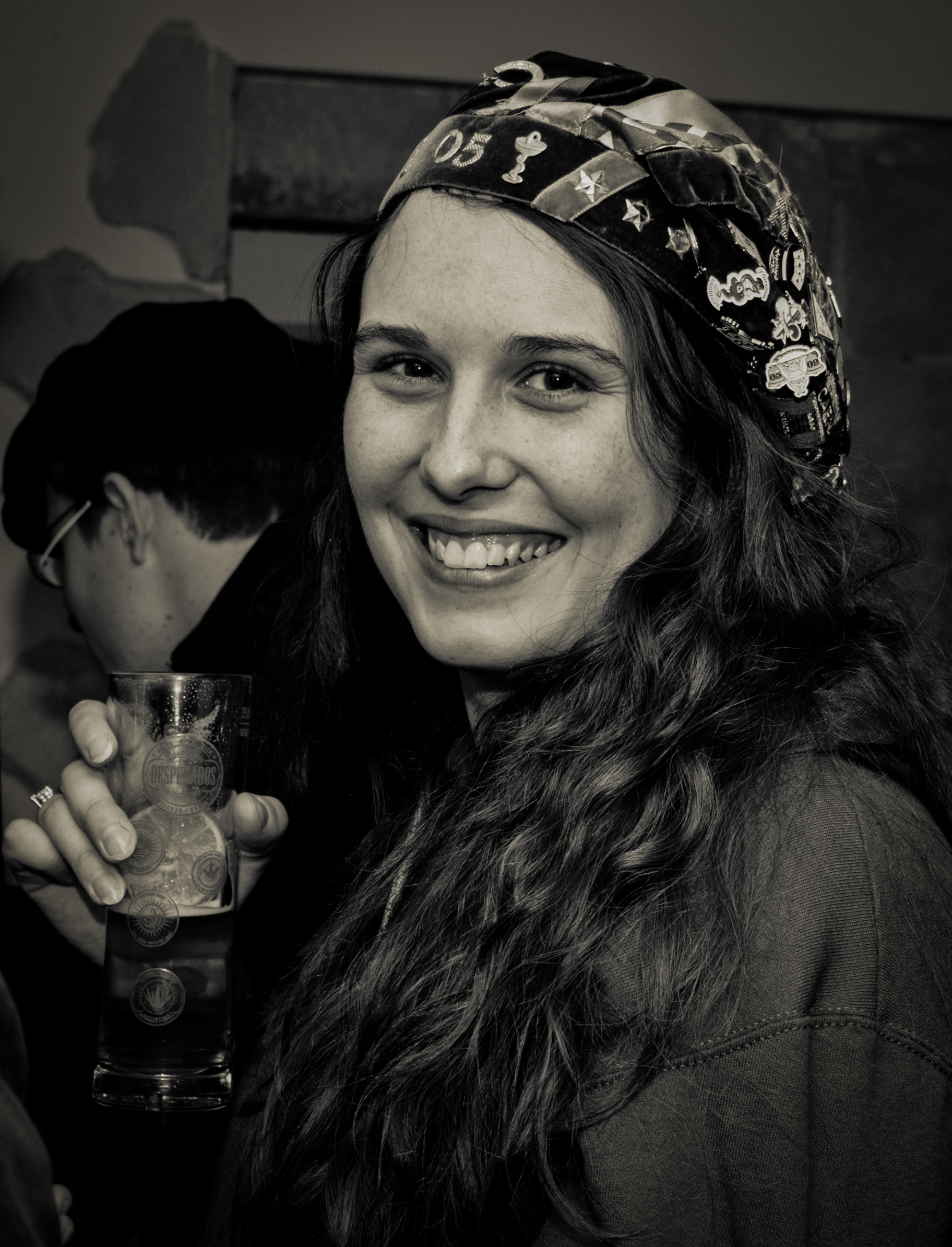
Falucharde of Caen in 2011.

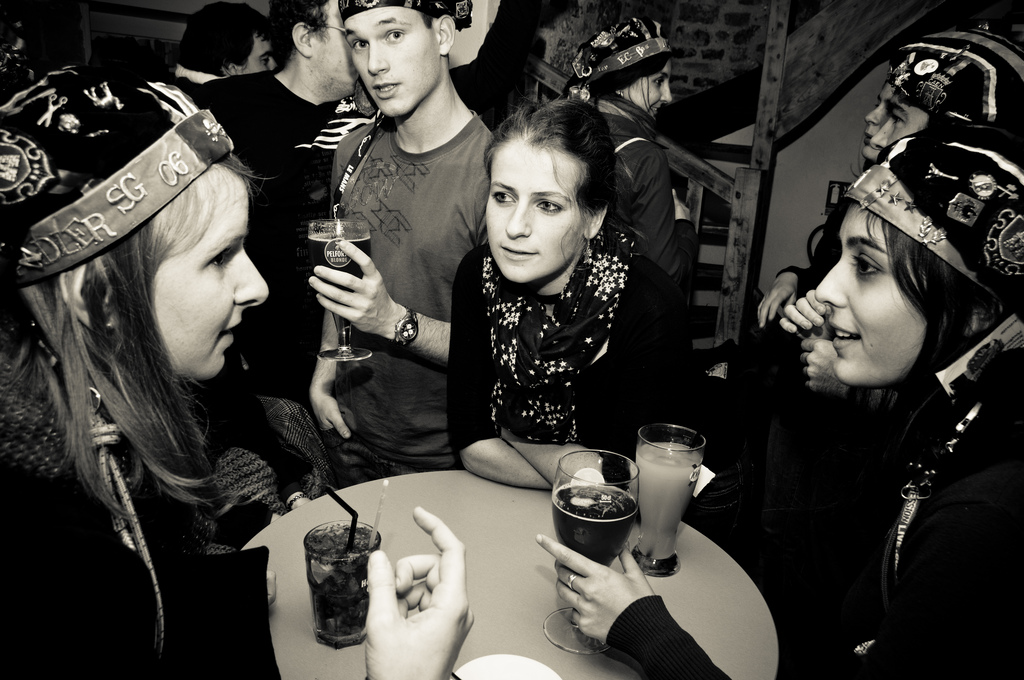
Faluchards socialising during an apéritif in Caen.

A faluche is a traditional cap worn by students in France. It is a black velvet beret, decorated with colored ribbons and badges.

Several student groups wear the faluche, especially bitards, basochards, and faluchards. Previously, the faluche was associated almost exclusively with faluchards, although other folklore exists concerning the faluche.

== History ==
Following demonstrations in 1884, the student association Association générale des étudiants of Paris ("A") was formed. On June 12, 1888, the Parisian students were invited to celebrate the 800th anniversary at the University of Bologna in Italy. At the celebration, the French students reportedly felt somewhat drab in comparison to the other students. The attire of the French delegation involved simply dark clothing brightened by one rosette in a buttonhole, and a ribbon in saltire with the colors of the town of Paris. Other European students, by contrast, had a wide variety of costumes and hairstyles: the Belgian students from secular schools had pennes, and those from Catholic schools had calottes; the Spaniards were bedecked with ribbons which proclaimed membership in specific universities; the Germans had their own caps; the Swiss had their thin kepis with small visors; the Italians wore a Louis XI-style hat, and others.

The French students thus decided to create a specific style of cap for themselves. They chose the black velvet beret of the inhabitants of the Bologna area, in remembrance of the students' congress in Bologna, which they fondly remembered.

On June 25, 1888, the date of the French students' return to Paris, that the faluche was really launched. Its popularity spread at the 600th anniversary of the University of Montpellier which took place May 22–25, 1890. From there, the tradition rapidly spread to other cities, with badges and ribbons added later.

The symbols used, initially transmitted orally, varied by university. This is why a synthesis was made in Lille on March 8, 1986, inspired by the Toulouse code. It was adopted as a national code in December 1986 in Toulouse, and it was at this time that the concept of Grand Master began. Then in 1988, at the time of the centenary of Faluche in Reims, a new more complete code was published, taking into account the Montpellier characteristics.

At the time of the German occupation during World War II, the wearing of the faluche was forbidden, except for the day of Saint Nicholas.

In 1988 the 100th anniversary of the faluche was celebrated in Reims, which has continued annually, in a different city each year.

== A "regulated" cap ==
The colors and badges related to the faluche recall the life of the student. A written code makes it possible to ensure a homogeneity within the faluchard movement so that each student can read the faluche and thus know the course of each person.

=== Circular ===
The circular is covered with a fabric band with the colors of the student's filière (= "course of study", "academic field", "academic discipline").

| Fabric | Filière | Color | Badge |
|---|---|---|---|
| Velvet (Montpellier: Satin) | Medicine | Red | medicine Caduceus (PCEM1: Skull on crossed bones) |
| Velvet (Montpellier: Satin) | Pharmacy | Green | pharmacy Caduceus |
| Velvet (Montpellier: Satin) | Dental | Purple | Molar |
| Velvet (Montpellier: Satin) | Veterinary surgeon | Bordeaux | Head of horse |
| Velvet (Montpellier: Satin) | Midwife nurse | Fuchsia | Ankh |
| Velvet (Montpellier: Satin) | Ancillary medical | Rose | Ancillary medical |
| Velvet (Montpellier: Satin) | Osteopathy | sky Blue | Sphénoid bone |
Satin
| Satin | Agriculture | Green bordered of Amarant | Cow's head on corn ear |
| Satin | Letters and languages | Yellow | Open book & quill |
| Satin | Geography | Yellow | sphere |
| Satin | History | Yellow | helmet of Prériclès |
| Satin | Archaeology | Yellow | Sphynx's head |
| Satin | Sociology | Yellow | Frog |
| Satin | Psychology | Yellow | Psi |
| Satin | Sciences | Purple | Crossed oak and laurel palms. |
| Satin | Art schools | Sky blue | Pallette and brush |
| Satin | Architecture | Sky blue | Tri-square and compass |
| Satin | Preparatory classes for Grandes Ecoles | Brown | Double-headed owl. |
| Satin | Engineer School | Blue and black | Star & lightning. |
| Satin | Physical education and sports | Dark green | Rooster, or Olympic rings, or letters STAPS, or rings (in Strasbourg), Letters "UFRAPS" (in Lyon, Aix...) |
| Satin | Oenology | Salmon pink | Bunch of grapes. |
| Satin | Law school | Red | Justice scales and sword |
| Satin | Economic sciences, Management | Orange | mercury Caduceus |
| Satin | Economic and Social administration | Clear green | Letters A.E.S |
| Satin | Political sciences | Red and blue | Closed umbrella |
| Satin | Theology | Red and white | Cross |
| Satin | Business school | Red and green | mercury Caduceus |
| Satin | IUT, BTS | With the colors of the discipline if not white (pink in Amiens, except GMP and BTS, in white) | Letters B.T.S or I.U.T |
| Satin | Music and Musicology | Silver | Quadrant |
| Satin | Preparation for the contests of teaching | Gray | Letters IUFM |

=== Characteristics ===
- In Amiens and Reims, the ribbons of city and areas are out of velvet, pointing out thus the tradition tisserande of these cities. Except the students in sciences which have their satin ribbons.
- In Bordeaux, the currency is on the circular, under the nickname. The badges on the circular are embroidered.
- In Dijon, the ribbons are out of velvet because it is the city which organized the States Généraux in 1989
- In Grenoble, the initial ones are in embroidered letters, the leg of Grand Chambellan is cut at a peak, the pines chartreuse is located on the ribbon of town of study and there is no oath at the end of the baptism.
- In Nantes the personal and codes parts are reversed. A red pompom is drawn up at the top pointing out the origins of Nantes, harbor city. By extension this symbol is tolerated for any origin of a harbor city.
  - The students into dental raise a ribbon of purple velvet circular with a red velvet edging which recalls their first year of medicine.
  - The students in economic sciences have like emblem the mercury caduceus and the balance (they were accommodated by the Droit corporation after the room of association had burned).
- To Lyon, the military students of the health service of the armies, or standards, carry a third ribbon, blue-white-red, between the two other ribbons. In the middle of this tricolour ribbon the badge of the school of the health service of the armies of Lyon-Bron is. In pharmacy, always in Lyon, the single attribute of the Grand Maître is a sun carried to the frontal, with the top of the circular green.
- In Poitiers, all the ribbons are braided. Moreover, the color of the circular Sage-femme is red velvet, identical to the Médecine circular but with the cross of Ankh. Moreover, the évèque of the south is named there.
- In Rouen, there is a third cross, that of the GD (Grand Délateur) which has as a role to prepare and to manage the "sanctions" during the baptisms. The former engineers have as a circular, a large black ribbon with a blue edging in the medium. The medical students (who place their caduceus on velvet and not on the circular) reverse the personal and official sides of their faluche. The students of law do not carry the colors of the town of Rouen but those of Jeanne d' Arc and their ribbons are not out of velvet but out of satin, (to be noted that this tradition is erased little by little). It is finally one of the only harbour cities not to raise the pompom.
- In Toulon the faluche does not have a Grand Maitre nor of Grand Chambelan. It is assembled Resident of Toulon which decides on the jury and the officiants at the beginning of the baptism by vote.
- In Tours the code is strictly followed.
- In Valence the color of a circular BTS is red, white, red. Moreover, the GM and GC are called Bitards Valentinois (in honor of Bitards Poitevins because the first GM Valentinois were established by our neighbors of Poitou-Charentes and the Center). There is a "braid of sponsorship" (with the colors of the town of birth and province of birth), it is offered by the godson to the godfather when he considers his work accomplished.

==== Local codes ====
The Alsatian and Montpelliérains faluchards have a different code than that usually called national code;

- The Alsatian faluche: in addition to differences in terms of colors of disciplines, badges and of provision of the ribbons, the Alsatian faluche is recognizable with the existence of velvet passers by on a flexible circumference (without reinforcement of leather or plastic), and of a mobile circular (which is not bent on the aforementioned circumference). The membership of the faluchard to the board of directors or the office of an association of students in a given field results in the presence of a "V" on the basis of the back of the faluche and pointing towards its center, with the colors of the field. In addition, there exists in its center neither Grand Maître, neither Grand Chamberlans, nor Bishops. A collegial assembly old faluchards (the TVA for Très Vénérables Anciens, co-opted among old the faluchards, which has more than two years of faluche), from a mixture of disciplines, have the role of being the guarantors of the local traditions faluchardes and of tallying the various ceremonies. They do not remain about it less faluchards like the others. Some faluchards (especially in medicine) carry the ribbon of the memory in memory of the left Alsatian students in Clermont-Ferrand during World War II.
- In Montpellier, the faluche is characterized by the presence from four burst with the colors from the studied principal discipline, thus forming four parts of black velvet equal. This tradition pays homage to Rabelais, who studied with the Faculty of Medicine of Montpellier to the 16th century.

== Organization ==
The faluchards in the majority of the courses of study and for each city elect a Grand Maître (GM) appointed like guarantor of the traditions and supported by a Grand Chamberlan (GC) whom it chooses. Their badge is a registered cross of the expression to the merit, which they carry at the end of a ribbon of the color of their course. The cross of GM is enamelled of white and that of GC is gilded. In Valence and Grenoble, the GC has a ribbon points some without cross with the colors of their discipline.

There are also three bishops who "reign" in a part of France: They "reign" in the towns of Amiens, Dijon and Poitiers. The bishop is recognized for his empathy and is charged to regulate the conflicts like celebrating the marriages faluchards.

In Nice there are also 12 knights who carry a kilt, representing the various courses of study of faluchés niçois, charged with organizing the faluchages and to be the guards of the traditions. The GM and GC are selected among the knights. There is even a specific code for the knighthood falucharde niçoise.

There are also orders (which do not have anything official) within the faluche. The membership of a brotherhood can be displayed on the faluche by a ribbon or a badge particular to each brotherhood.

== Congress anniversaries ==
- Centenary of the faluche, in Reims, June 25–26, 1988
- States General of the faluche, in Dijon, June 23–25, 1989
- National Convention of the faluche, in Lille, June 22–24, 1990

Past anniversaries of the faluche:

- 103rd: Clermont-Ferrand, June 23–25, 1991
- 104th: Poitiers, June 24–24, 1992
- 105th: Nancy, July 3, 1993
- 106th: Toulouse, July 1–3, 1994
- 107th: Paris, June 30–July 2, 1995
- 108th: Orléans, June 28–30, 1996
- 109th: Montpellier, June 27–29, 1997
- 110th: Reims, July 3, 1998
- 111th: Grenoble, June 25–27, 1999
- 112th: Lille, June 30–July 2, 2000
- 113th: Poitiers, June 29–July 1, 2001
- 114th: Paris, June 28–30, 2002
- 115th: Bordeaux, June 27–29, 2003
- 116th: Toulouse, July 2, 2004
- 117th: Lyon, July 8, 2005
- 118th: Amiens, July 7, 2006 (cancelled; organized in Onzain on the same dates with a first date in Blois(by faluchards of Paris and Brest)
- 119th: Montpellier, June 29–July 1, 2007
- 120th: Reims, 4–6 July 2008
- 121st: Strasbourg, in 2009
- 122nd: Grenoble, in 2010
- 123rd: Aix-en-Provence, July 2011
- 124th: Paris, 4, 7, 8 July 2012
- 125th: Nantes, 5, 6, 7 July 2013
- 126th: Toulouse, 4, 5, 6 July 2014
- 127th: Rouen, 3, 4, 5 July 2015
- 128th: Lille, 1, 2, 3 July 2016
- 129th: Montpellier, June 30 - July 2, 2017
- 130th: Reims, 6, 7, 8 July 2018

== Other student traditions ==
=== In France ===
- The Trad's (Traditions) of the Gadz'Arts of the Arts et Métiers ParisTech (ENSAM)
- The blouse at the Université de technologie de Belfort-Montbéliard
- The stone-block in certain classes prépa
- Bitards in Poitiers
- Berets of colors for the various ENI
- The overalls at different spinneret

=== Student hats in the world ===
- Belgium: alto, béret d'art, bierpet, klak, calotte and penne
- Grand Duchy of Luxembourg: cap
- Italy: feluca (also called pileo, goliardo or berretto universitario)
- Switzerland: Stella
- Portugal: Capa
- Spain : Tuna
- Poland: Dekiel, Czapka Studencka (student's hat) (referred to student corporations in Poland
- Scandinavian countries: studentmossa

== Sources ==
- La faluche, histoire, décryptage et analyse, Guy Daniel, thèse pour le doctorat en médecine, Lille, 1990 (Bibliothèque universitaire - Section de Médecine - Lille 50375 1990 166)
- La symbolique de la faluche, K. Vernier, mémoire de maîtrise d'ethnologie, Strasbourg, 1991–1992
- La faluche, naissance et renaissance, C. Lambert, thèse pour le doctorat de pharmacie, 1993
- La faluche, une forme de sociabilité estudiantine, Manuel Ségura, mémoire de maîtrise d'histoire, Poitiers, 1994
- La faluche, béret hérité, béret des héritiers, N. Romé, mémoire de maîtrise de sociologie, Angers, 1994
- Symbolism and the faluchard movement, M. Collins, Sunderland England, 1999 (en anglais)
