= Devereux =

- Current region: Wales, Ireland and England
- Origin: Wales, Herefordshire
- Connected families: D'Évreux ("of Évreux", France), Devereaux and Deveraux

Devereux is a Norman surname. Derived form of D'Evreux / Devreux, meaning d'Évreux ("from Évreux", a town in Normandy, France), the surname is found frequently in Ireland, Wales and England and to a lesser extent elsewhere in the English-speaking world.

Saint Devereux Church in Hereford, United Kingdom is also named Saint Dubricius and is dedicated to the 6th-century clergyman Saint Dubricius from Hereford, suggesting that the name is a Norman French rendering of Dubricius or the saint's Welsh name Dyfrig. In Ireland the name is associated with Wexford, where the Cambro-Normans first invaded from Pembrokeshire, Wales, in 1170. Anglo-Norman develops regularly a svarabakhti vowel /e/ between /v/ and /r/, such as in overi (French ouvrit "opened"), or livere (French livre "book"). Dubricius is called Dubrice in French and Dyfrig would have given *Difry / *Dufry in French and *Difery / *Dufery in Anglo-Norman, and St Devereux is probably a mistranslation after the surname Devereux. The French variant is Devreux, which unlike Devereux is found within Normandy and France themselves.

The similar names Devereaux and Deveraux are alternative spellings of the surname resulting from the various ways of pronouncing it – the placename is pronounced "Dev-ruh" (French pronunciation: [devʁø]), and the surname may be pronounced "Dever-o", "Dever-oo", "Dever-ooks", "Dev-erah", "Dev-rah", "Dev-ruh", or (in and around Wexford) "Dev-rix".

== People ==
- Count of Évreux, title of French nobility at the origin of the name
- Catherine Ann Devereux (1823–1875), American diarist
- Elizabeth Devereux-Rochester (1917–1983), British female spy
- George Devereux (1908–1985), French-Hungarian ethnologist and psychoanalyst (born in Lugoj, nowadays part of Romania)
- Helena Devereux (1885–1975), American educator and founder of the Devereux Foundation
- James Devereux (1903–1988), U.S. Marine Corps General and politician
- Jim Devereux (1885–1936), Australian rugby league footballer
- John Devereux (disambiguation)
- Lillie Devereux Blake (1833–1913), American feminist
- Marie Devereux (1940–2019), British actress
- Mary Bayard Devereux (1827–1886), American writer and photographer
- Nicholas Devereux (1791–1855), Irish-American banker, trustee and western New York landowner
- General Ricardo Wall y Devereux (1694–1777), Spanish General and Prime Minister of the 18th century
- Richard Devereux (disambiguation)
- Robert Devereux, 2nd Earl of Essex (1565–1601), military hero and royal favourite, executed for treason
- Robert Devereux, 3rd Earl of Essex (1591–1646), son of Robert Devereux, courtier and soldier
- Robin Devereux, 19th Viscount Hereford (born 1975), a peer and premier viscount
- Sean Devereux (1964–1993), British educator, aid worker and missionary
- Wallace Charles Devereux (1893–1952), British metallurgist and businessman, founder of High Duty Alloys Ltd
- Walter Devereux (disambiguation) is a name shared by several members of the same family
- William Devereux, Baron Devereux of Lyonshall (c.1244–1314), a Marcher Lord in the times of Edward I and II in England

== Organizations ==
- Devereux Foundation, U.S. non-profit organization founded by Helena Devereux
- Devereux Glenholme School, Connecticut

== Places ==
- Devereux (Herefordshire), lost village in the United Kingdom
- Devereux, Georgia, a community in the United States
- Devereux Creek, Queensland, a locality in the Mackay Region, Australia
- St Devereux (Herefordshire), church and parish south of Hereford, originally dedicated to the Welsh Saint Dyfrig, Bishop of Ergyng
- Devereux Beach, a beach near the campus of the University of California, Santa Barbara
- Devereux Beach, a beach in Marblehead, Massachusetts

== See also ==
- Roberto Devereux, tragic opera by Gaetano Donizetti, loosely based on Robert Devereux, 2nd Earl of Essex
