= Deveau =

Deveau is a surname of French origin, being a cognate of the surname Devaux, which means "from the valleys". Notable people with the surname include:

- David Deveau (born 1953), American classical pianist
- George R. Deveau (1891–1983), Canadian politician
- J. Alphonse Deveau, (1917–2004), Canadian historian
- John Deveau, Canadian politician
- Louis Deveau (born 1931), Canadian businessman

== See also ==
- Devaux
- Deveaux
