= Devaux =

Devaux is a French surname. Notable people with the surname include:

- André Devaux (1894–1981), French sprint runner
- Antoine Devaux (born 1985), French association football defender
- Denis Devaux (1939–2025), French footballer
- François-Antoine Devaux (1712–1796), French poet
- Jean-Christophe Devaux (born 1975 ), French association football player
- Henri Devaux (1862–1956), French biophysicist
- Marianne Devaux (born 1962), New Caledonian politician
- Paul Devaux (1801–1880), Belgian politician
- Philippe Devaux (1902–1979), Belgian philosopher
- Pierre Devaux (1897–1994), Belgian Olympic runner

== See also ==
- Deveaux
