= Devereaux (disambiguation) =

Devereaux is a surname. It may also refer to:

== People ==
- Devereaux Mytton (1924–1989), Australian competitive sailor and Olympic medalist
- Devereaux Peters (born 1989), American basketball player

== Place ==
- Devereaux, New Brunswick, Canada
- Devereux, Georgia, United States, also spelled Devereaux, an unincorporated community
- Devereaux Elementary School, British Columbia, Canada

== See also ==
- Devereaux House (disambiguation)
