= Amédée Masclef =

19th C French Botanist and illustrator

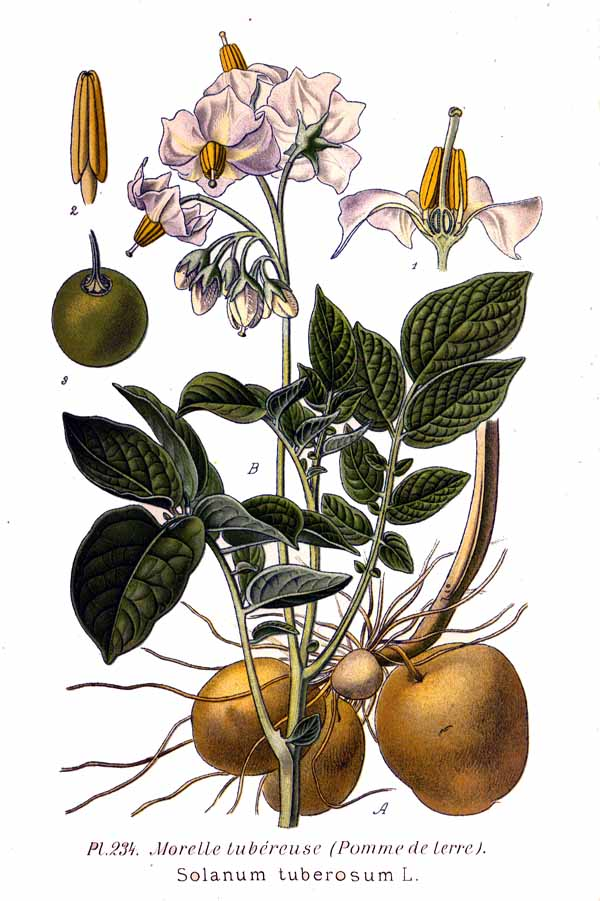
Solanum tuberosum

Amédée Masclef (9 August 1858 Béthune – 1916) was a French abbé and botanist best known for his three-volume 400-plate work 'Atlas des plantes de France' published in Paris in 1891 and re-issued in 1893. It was regarded as complementary to "Nouvelle flore du Nord de la France et de la Belgique" by Georges de Layens and Gaston Bonnier.

The standard author abbreviation Masclef is used to indicate this person as the author when citing a botanical name.

He was Professor of Natural Sciences at the Petit séminaire d'Arras and was a member of the Société botanique de France from 1885. He also published 'Catalogue Raisonne des Plantes Vasculaires du Departement du Pas-de-calais' (1886), and 'Les plantes d'Europe' (Paris : C. Reinwald : Schleicher frères, 1905), and 'Contributions à la flore du département du Pas-de-Calais. Notice sur l'herbier du musée de la ville d'Arras (1885)'. Upon leaving the Petit séminaire he took up the position of curator of Gaston Bonnier's herbarium, and in 1905 was recorded as living in Champlan.

Also published was 'Les Plantes d'Europe' (5 editions published between 1890 and 1953 in French).

He was survived by his wife, Leonie Marie Adele Mekarski (1869–1916), whom he had married in 1891, and was the daughter of Louis Jean Népomocène Mekarski and Fanny Louise Mekarski (born Conchon). Amédée and Leonie had one daughter, Louise Fanny Léonie Masclef, who married one Gommerat.
