= Van Sinderen =

Van Sinderen is a surname. Notable people with the surname include:

- Adrian Van Sinderen (1887–1963), American businessman and civic leader
- Adrian Van Sinderen Lindsley (1814–1885), American lawyer, businessman, and politician
- Alfred Van Sinderen (1924–1998), American telephone executive
