= Devereux Glenholme School =

American therapeutic boarding school

Coordinates: 41.646°N 73.304°W

The Glenholme School Devereux Glenholme School

Location
- 81 Sabbaday Lane; Washington, Connecticut 06793; United States

Information
- Type: Therapeutic boarding school
- Established: 1968
- Dean: Morgan Folks
- Director: Daniel Bailey
- Faculty: 28
- Grades: 5-12 + PG
- Gender: Coed
- Age range: 10-22
- Enrollment: 40-50
- Student to teacher ratio: 10:1
- Campus size: 110 acres (0.45 km^{2})
- Colors: Blue, Yellow
- Mascot: Grizzly
- Website: theglenholmeschool.org

The Glenholme School, also known as Devereux Glenholme School, is an independent coeducational therapeutic boarding school situated over 110 acres (0.45 km^{2}) in Washington, Connecticut, United States. The school aims to provide a highly structured environment for children between the ages 10 to 21 who face challenges from various conditions, including high functioning autism spectrum disorders (ASD) and Asperger syndrome; ADHD, OCD, Tourette syndrome, depression, anxiety, and emotional and learning disabilities.

== Program ==
Services include a comprehensive academic curriculum, sports, fine arts, and an emphasis on community service. The program includes residential treatment, day treatment, summer program and post-secondary college and transitional living services.

The school's milieu therapy is intended to address varying levels of academic, social and special needs development for boys and girls ages 10 to 21. Glenholme aims to prepare graduates for higher education and post-secondary career opportunities.

== Faculty ==
The school has a psychiatrist, a psychologist, seven clinicians, 34 boarding instructors and 28 education faculty including teachers, aides, and special programs. All teachers are either certified in Special Education in Connecticut or are content-area certified in Connecticut. While the student-to-staff ratio is 10:1, the student-to-on-duty staff ratio is considerably lower.

== History ==
Devereux Glenholme was established in 1968 on the country estate of the Van Sinderen family, which had been donated to the Devereux Foundation by Jean White Van Sinderen, who had learned of the work of special education pioneer Helena T. Devereux and desired to create a school where children with special behavioral and learning needs could develop their potential. The school's administrative offices are in a Colonial Revival house originally called Glen Holme, designed by architect Ehrick Rossiter for industrialist William Leslie Van Sinderen (1856–1909) and completed in 1898.

The Communities of Character program for character education was developed by Devereux Glenholme, as the first school to bring the program to Connecticut in the mid-1990s.

In subsequent years the school was supported by Mrs. Van Sinderen's son, Alfred W. Van Sinderen, one-time chief executive officer of Southern New England Telephone Company who died in 1998.

== Accreditation and affiliations ==
Glenholme is accredited by the New England Association of Schools and Colleges. It also is a member of the National Association of Independent Schools and the Connecticut Association of Independent Schools and holds approvals from the California Department of Education, Los Angeles Unified School District, Connecticut Department of Children and Families, Connecticut Department of Education, District of Columbia Department of Education, Massachusetts Department of Education, New Jersey Department of Education, Illinois Department of Education, and New York Department of Education.

== Use of restraints ==
During the 1990s, Devereux Glenholme was successful in instituting staff training that resulted in significant reductions in its use of physical restraints and time-outs, in spite of an increase in the severity of behavioral symptoms among its students. More recently, the school participated in a project supported by the Substance Abuse and Mental Health Services Administration aimed at further reducing the use of restraints and seclusion in residential behavioral health care settings.

== In the news ==
The school frequently enlists celebrities to assist in fundraising, thus garnering publicity.

In May 2009, the school received media attention when it broke ground for a new arts center and held an auction fundraiser with the support of James Marsden and Jessica Biel.

In August 2010, special culinary guests Johnny Iuzinni, of Bravo TV's Top Chef, and David Arnold, director of the French Culinary Institute's technology department, shared their passion for science and the culinary craft to concoct several out-of-this-world creations for the culinary connoisseurs at Glenholme.

In May 2011 comedians Jim Carrey and Tracy Morgan participated in the school's annual Parents' Weekend and the opening events for the school's Center for the Arts.

In 2012, Glenholme culinary students enjoyed a private demonstration and hands-on lesson with chef Barbara Lynch of Barbara Lynch Gruppo (formerly No. 9 Group).

In 2012, David O. Russell publicly supported the school's fundraising efforts while promoting his movie, Silver Linings Playbook. Vanity Fair, Barneys New York and Weinstein Co. celebrated Silver Linings Playbook in support of the Glenholme School on Wednesday February 20, 2013 as part of pre-Oscar week in Los Angeles. Russell and Parenthood producer Jason Katims assisted in another New York City Fundraiser to benefit the school's scholarship fund in October 2013, enlisting the support of actress Natalie Dormer.

In 2015, Russell enlisted numerous celebrities to support the school's fifth New York City fundraiser. Guests included Robert De Niro, Grace Hightower, Harvey Weinstein, Dascha Polanco, Cristin Milioti and Isabella Rossellini.

Russell and Dascha Polanco returned to Glenholme's New York City fundraiser in 2016 to support the cause and honor Joe Hall, President of Ghetto Film School. Glenholme also receives local media attention for campus activities including annual events such as Grandparents' Day, Alumni Day, Boarding Recognition Week, Canine Collection, guest presenters including Ally Del Monte, who spoke with students about bullying in October 2015, and Krista Weltner, who discussed harnessing the strength of her learning disability to complete an MFA in the Puppet Arts Program at the University of Connecticut, as well as various community service efforts including a fundraiser by the school's culinary program, traditional food drives, promoting tourism and the arts, and the honoring of American heroes in conjunction with Wreaths Across America every December. In recent years, the school generated awareness and community spirit with a 5K Run for Autism. In 2016, the school's annual autism run continued to generate awareness.

In 2017, Glenholme became the subject of a child abuse sex scandal dating to 2001. A fifteen-year-old male was forced into a sexual relationship with an older female staff member. When the student reported the crime, Judith Cooper, the executive administrator, denied the affair and took no measures to protect the student. The student's parents eventually removed him and have sued the school.

In June 2018, Glenholme celebrated 50 years as a special needs boarding school with a jubilee gala. Filmmaker David O. Russell and Good Morning America's Robin Roberts hosted the evening gala.

== Notable former students ==
- Nancy Spungen, girlfriend of Sid Vicious, attended in 1970–1971.
- Sylvester Stallony
