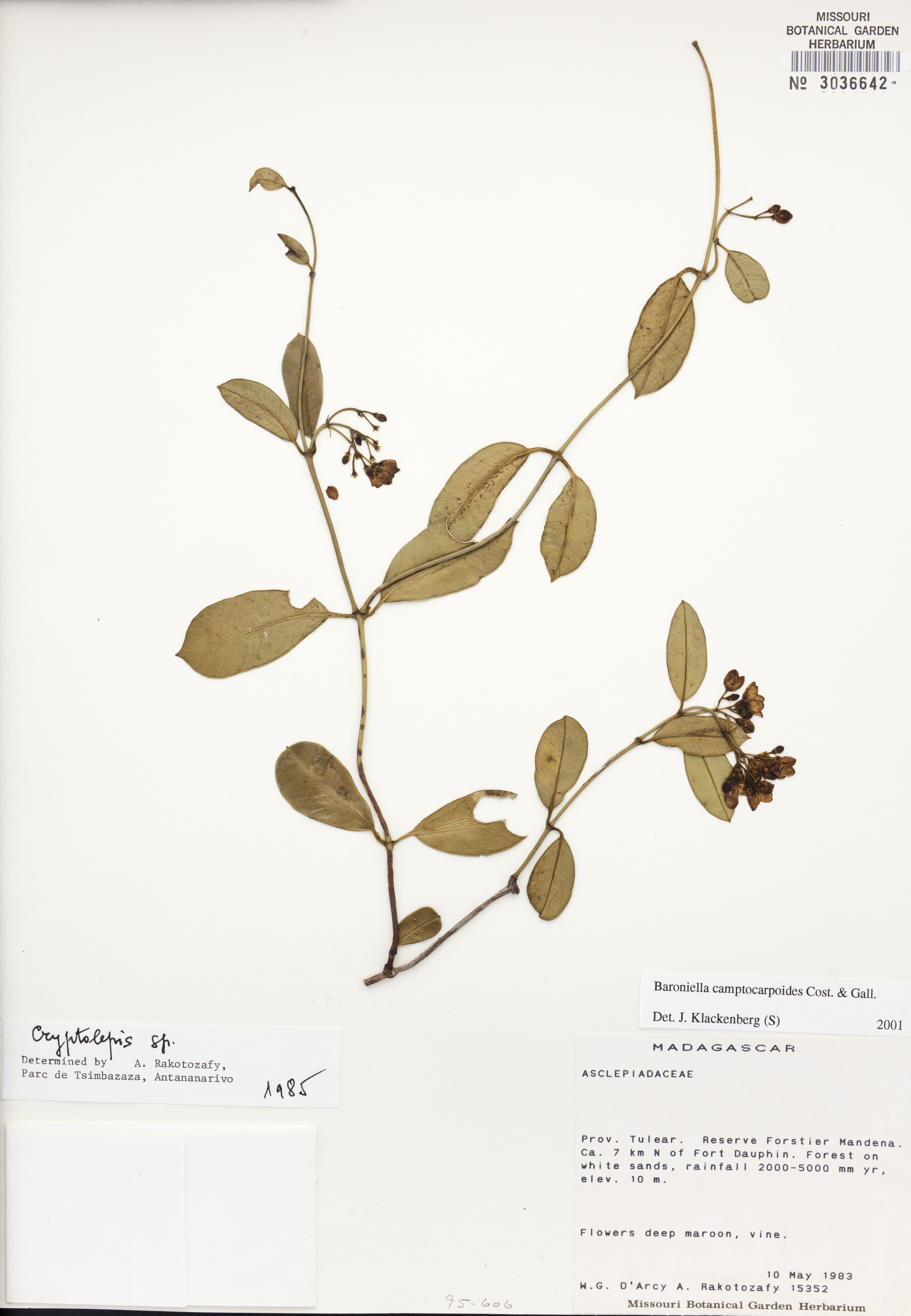
- Photograph of an herbarium specimen of Baroniella camptocarpoides

Conservation status
- Near Threatened (IUCN 3.1)

Scientific classification
- Kingdom: Plantae
- Clade: Tracheophytes
- Clade: Angiosperms
- Clade: Eudicots
- Clade: Asterids
- Order: Gentianales
- Family: Apocynaceae
- Genus: Baroniella
- Species: B. camptocarpoides

Binomial name
- Baroniella camptocarpoides Costantin & Gallaud

Synonyms
- Baseonema camptocarpoides (Costantin & Gallaud) Choux

= Baroniella camptocarpoides =

Species of flowering plant

Baroniella camptocarpoides is a species of plant in the Apocynaceae family. It is endemic to Madagascar. Julien Noël Costantin and Ernest-Isidore Gallaud, the botanists who first formally described the species, named it after its resemblance to, but distinctiveness from, plants in the genus Camptocarpus.

== Description ==
It is twining plant that reaches 4 meters in height and is woody only at the base of its stem. The hairless, thin, narrow, elliptical leaves are 3–6 by 1–3.5 centimeters. The tips of the leaves pointed to sharply pointed. The bases have a cut-off to wedge shape. The leaves' midribs are impressed on top, projecting below. The secondary veins are faint and even with the surface of the leaves. Its petioles are 5–12 millimeters long, often curved. Its pendulous, branched Inflorescences occur in axillary and terminal positions and are 2-10 centimeters long. Each inflorescence has numerous flowers. Each flower is on a pedicel that is 5–15 millimeters long. The pedicels have bracts that are up to 1 millimeter long. Its flowers have 5 oblong to oval sepals that are 1.3–1.6 by 1.2–1.6 millimeters, with rounded tips and smooth margins. Its 5 dull-red to purple petals are fused at the base forming a 1.8–2.7 millimeter long tube. The free, narrow to broad, oval to elliptical lobes of the petals are 6.1–8.8 by 3.1–5.4 millimeters. The tips of the petals are rounded to pointed. The flowers have a structure between the petals and the stamens called a corona. Its corona forms a short undulating ring with lobes between the stamens that are 0.2–0.3 millimeters high with flat to slightly bi-lobed tops, as well as indistinct lobes opposite the stamens. The flowers have 5 stamen with rectangular anthers and filaments that are 0.5–1.0 millimeters long. The connective tissue between the compartments forms and extended cap half again as long as the anther. The flowers have a pistil that is 1.4–1.9 millimeters long with an inverse-cone shaped stigma. The stigma has 5 subtle lobes and each lobe bears a structure called a pollen carrier. The pollen carriers have a stalk and a 0.5–1.0 millimeter long spathe. The hairless, long, thin, curved fruit are 20–28 by 0.2–0.3 centimeters that are recurved 45–90 degrees at their base. Each fruit has several seeds that are 7–8 millimeters long that are tufted with 2.5 centimeters long hairs.

=== Reproductive biology ===
The pollen of Baroniella camptocarpoides is shed as permanent tetrads.

=== Distribution and habitat ===
It has been observed growing in sandy soils, in coastal forests at elevations of up to 580 meters.
