= Willie Hudson =

American baseball player

- Outfielder / First baseman / Pitcher
- Born: June 2, 1918; Devereux, Georgia
- Died: September 27, 1943 (aged 25); Cincinnati, Ohio
- Batted: Left Threw: Left

Negro league baseball debut
- 1937, for the Cincinnati Tigers

Last appearance
- 1942, for the Chicago American Giants
- Stats at Baseball Reference

Teams
- Cincinnati Tigers (1937); Cincinnati White Sox (1938); Kansas City Monarchs (1939); Chicago American Giants (1940–1942)

William Allen "Frank" Hudson (June 2, 1918 – September 27, 1943) was an American Negro league outfielder, first baseman and pitcher who played between 1937 and 1942.

== Career ==
A native of Devereux, Georgia, Hudson began his career playing sandlot ball in Cincinnati. He joined the Cincinnati Tigers in 1937 and spent 1938 with the Cincinnati White Sox.

Hudson joined the Kansas City Monarchs of the Negro American League in 1939. He went on to play three seasons with the Chicago American Giants from 1940 to 1942, and was selected to play in the East–West All-Star Game in 1941. That season, Chicago manager Candy Jim Taylor regarded Hudson as the best left-handed pitching prospect since Bill Foster. While with the American Giants, he earned the moniker "Rubber Arm" for his ability to extend his body for errant throws at first base.

Hudson died in Cincinnati, Ohio in 1943 at age 25.
