= James Bowman (painter) =

American painter (1793–1842)

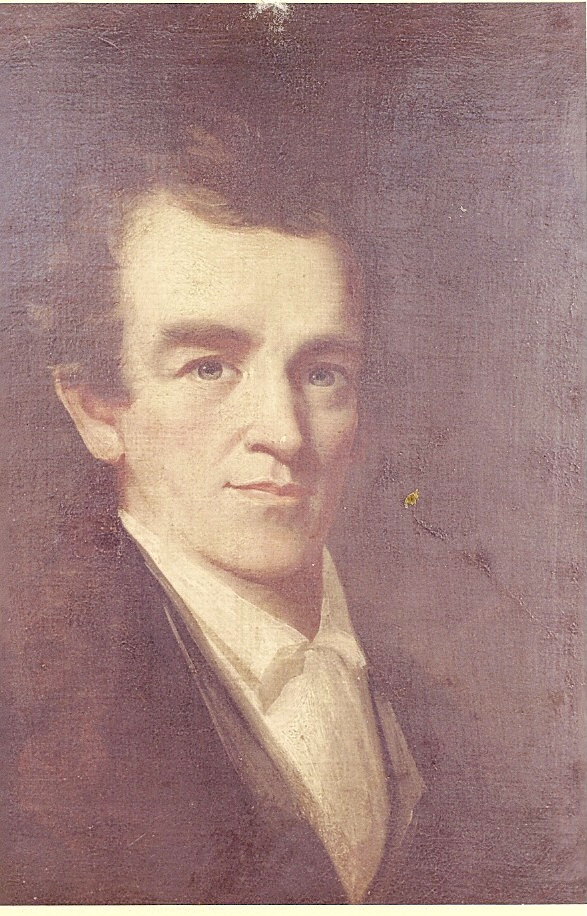
- Self Portrait by James Bowman
- Born: c. 1793; Allegheny County, Pennsylvania
- Died: May 18, 1842; Rochester, New York
- Known for: Itinerant painter of portraits and landscapes
- Spouse: Julia Marie Josephine Chew

James Bowman (c. 1793 – May 18, 1842) was an American itinerant artist and portrait painter. He was born in Allegheny County, Pennsylvania near Pittsburgh. Sometime between 1813 and 1815, James Bowman went to Chillicothe, Ohio, to learn to be a carpenter. There he met the itinerant painter Mr. J. T. Turner who taught him the rudiments of portrait painting (such as mixing paints). He gained considerable success when he started out professionally, painting in Pittsburgh and other communities in the early 1820s. He traveled to Philadelphia to learn from the masters there, but as a beginning artist could not make a living in that more cosmopolitan and competitive environment and became an itinerant portrait painter instead.

James Bowman was the earliest professional artist in Erie, Pennsylvania, painting there in 1817. According to Elizabeth Kelly, he painted portraits of the "early Erie aristocracy" and "… the fact that all of these prominent people had their portraits painted by Bowman indicates that they felt a real need to preserve their likenesses for posterity. The fact that Bowman spent such a brief time in Erie, however, indicates that during the early 1800s, Erie had not yet advanced to a point where it could support a full-time portrait painter." Bowman may also have visited Meadville, Pennsylvania seeking commissions near the same time. An article in the Crawford Weekly Messenger for Thursday July 15, 1830, indicates that the "now celebrated Bowman" painted portraits in Meadville in 1816. By 1822 Bowman was painting in the Washington, D.C., area. The biography reprinted from the Literary Cadet states how he hoped to become "patronized and protected by those guardians of the country—the members of congress… That year he exhibited a Portrait of a Gentleman at the Pennsylvania Academy of the Fine Arts in Philadelphia and painted a portrait of Edward Stabler, a Quaker and apothecary in Alexandria, Virginia. Through a wealthy contact in Alexandria Bowman may have gained patronage with citizens of that town, including William Cranch, a judge and cousin of John Quincy Adams, whose portrait he painted.

== European travel and study ==
Most of the outstanding portrait painters of this time were trained in Europe and Bowman felt if he was to have a career in art he needed access to additional training. An eloquent appeal for funds on Bowman’s behalf was made by "P.F." in an article in the Washington Gazette in March, 1822. Calling him an American genius and citing his humble upbringing, P.F. called upon the local citizens to support Bowman's desire to travel to Europe. Most probably, Bowman arrived in London penniless and with few acquaintances. However, at some point he rented a room from a widow named Mrs. Walter Channing Bridgen at 2 Cleveland Street, Buckingham, a place where several American artists including Charles Robert Leslie (1794-1859), Washington Allston (1779-1843), Thomas Sully (1783-1872), Samuel F. B. Morse (1791-1872), and Charles Bird King (1785-1862) had previously lived or dined. In addition Bowman was asked to paint "some of the most distinguished families in the kingdom, among which, were those of the Lord Chancellor, and of Gov. Clarkson of Woodbridge." Another source describes these gentlemen as patrons of Bowman.

Although several sources indicate that Bowman was a student of Sir Thomas Lawrence while in London, there is little evidence that Bowman did study with Lawrence except for Bowman's entry in Artists in Ohio 1787-1900 which states that he "… received, by his own account, some lessons from Sir Thomas Lawrence in London." According to Garlick, Sir Thomas Lawrence had paying pupils who received little training, but were allowed to make copies and ask for advice. It certainly appears Bowman met and became friends with several portrait and landscape artists working at the time in London. These included Charles Robert Leslie, Samuel F. B. Morse and Chester Harding (1792-1866).

It is through Chester Harding's diary kept during his first visit to England, selections of which were published in 1866 by his daughter, Margaret Eliot Harding White, that one learns some of the details of Bowman's life in England and of his first visit to Paris. By the winter of 1825 Bowman had moved to Birmingham when he stayed with the family of Mr. Van Wert, the brother-in-law of Washington Irving, and opened a gallery of paintings or studio there.

A footnote to a letter by Nathaniel Carter indicates that he met Bowman for a second time in the winter of 1827 in Paris and that Bowman was on his way to Italy "where a study of the great masters of that country, added to his native genius and self-acquired proficiency, cannot fail to render him eminent in his profession. He (Bowman) took a likeness of General LaFayette, which is in the highest degree creditable to his pencil."

In contrast to Harding's description of Bowman's lack of recognition at the time at least two accounts indicate that he was spoken of highly by important artists and critical art journals. Sir Thomas Lawrence is quoted as saying "I do most sincerely believe that Bowman will, at no distant day, supply the vacuum, which has been caused, in the world of the arts, by the demise of our lamented West, and sustain the high reputation which that great master of our art, acquired not only for himself and his country, but for England and the age." Sir Lawrence is said to have recommended Bowman to the Bishop of Worcester as "one of the few painters in the kingdom who could do complete justice to a portrait of that functionary". The London Museum is mentioned as just one of the critical art journals which noticed his work in 1825, though at the very same time his portraits were rejected by the London exhibitions.

Probably sometime in 1827 Bowman went to Paris where he became acquainted with the Marquis de Lafayette, as it is said that he lived with Lafayette's family for nine months. It was during this time that he must have painted a portrait of Lafayette and his daughters later displayed in Charleston, South Carolina, and perhaps others of the Marquis. A friend and frequent guest of Lafayette's was the American novelist James Fenimore Cooper. Bowman painted a portrait of Cooper which was also displayed in his studio in Charleston South Carolina where a visitor described it. Perhaps a year later Bowman went to Italy for additional study at the Academy of Fine Arts in Rome. In 1828 he painted a three quarter length portrait of Bertel Thorvaldsen, the Danish sculptor, which Bowman considered his chef d’oeuvre. Having completed his study in Italy, Bowman returned to France late in 1828 before returning to the United States, possibly via New Orleans, where he intended to spend the winter painting portraits. An article in the Toronto Patriot in 1834 suggests that he had been invited to paint King Louis Phillip of France but returned to America instead.

== Return to the U.S.: Pittsburgh, Charleston and Boston ==
On August 6, 1829, the Crawford Weekly Messenger reprinted a news item from the Mercer Pennsylvania press of August 1 about "Mr. Bowman, the celebrated American Artist" visiting his father in Mercer upon his return from Europe. He was to stay ten to twelve days before going to Washington to paint the "President of the United States to be transmitted to Gen. La Fayette." The article praises him for having returned with a "name, reputation, and fame, gained by his own unassisted efforts, and inherent talents." He opened a gallery in Pittsburgh in 1829 but moved to Charleston, S.C. to paint during the winters of 1829/30 and 1830/31. While painting in Charleston Bowman was asked by William H. Gibbes upon the recommendation of Washington Allston to instruct James DeVeaux (1812-1844). Also during this time Bowman provided George Whiting Flagg(1816-1897), a nephew of Washington Allston, his first instruction after Flagg's family moved to Charleston from New Haven, Connecticut. Sometime in 1831 Bowman left South Carolina and went to Boston.During this time, he supported himself by painting at least two portraits and giving private painting and drawing lessons to students at the Ursuline nuns’ Mount Benedictine Academy in Charlestown, Massachusetts. The portraits were of Benedict Joseph Fenwick, and Mary Anne Ursula Moffatt.

== Canadian travel: Quebec, Montreal and Toronto ==
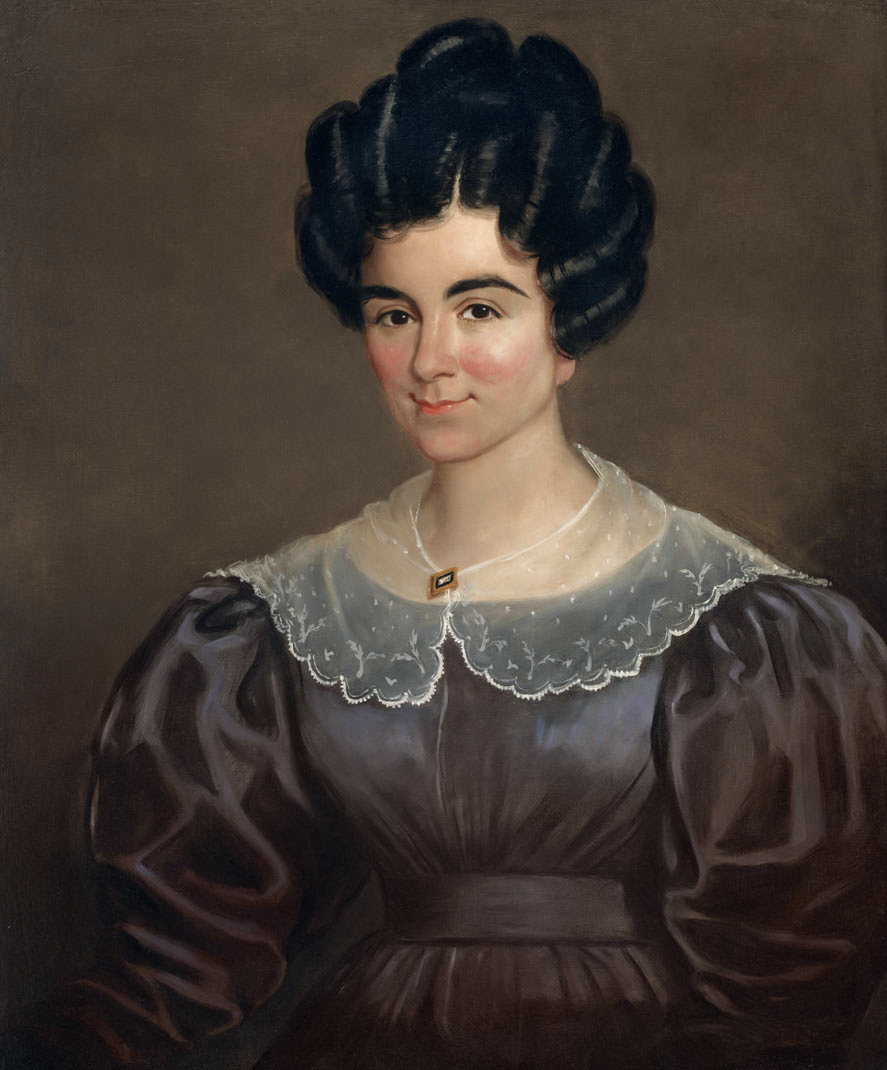
Madame Colin Robertson (James Bowman, 1833)

At the end of the summer of 1831 Bowman moved to Québec taking the Fenwick and Moffatt portraits with him. This introduction to the Québec nuns obviously provided the opportunity for him to teach painting to both the nuns and pupils in the Canadian Ursuline convent and school. In Québec he was able to support himself painting portraits and religious paintings for a while despite competition from the conservative and hot-tempered Canadian portrait painter, Antoine Plamondon who considered Québechis own territory. In 1833 Bowman moved to Montreal where he had commissions for several paintings for the Notre Dame church there. However he left suddenly in 1834 and settled in Toronto where he painted portraits.

Bowman had two artist friends while in Toronto—Samuel Bell Waugh (1814-1855) also from Mercer, Pennsylvania and Paul Kane (1810-1871), a Canadian artist. Bowman and Waugh agreed to study together in Italy at some future date. According to the Patriot (December 5, 1834) Bowman and Waugh planned to go to Rome in the spring of 1835 where Bowman was to deliver the Chapel of Indian Church of Two Mountains painting to the Pope, but instead Bowman moved to Detroit. In late 1836 Kane also went to Detroit and was disappointed to find the trip to Rome cancelled due to Bowman's marriage.

== Detroit and the Midwest ==
In late 1835, Bowman opened a studio in Detroit advertising his availability for both portrait painting and art lessons. There he gave lessons to his most famous pupil, John Mix Stanley (1814-1872) who became well known for his paintings of Native Americans and western landscapes. Bowman and Stanley formed a partnership to paint portraits and traveled together through Michigan, Illinois, and Wisconsin. In 1836 James Bowman married Julia Marie Josephine Chew in Detroit. Julia was born October 31, 1817, in Hackensack, New Jersey. It is believed that Bowman and Stanley left Michigan sometime in 1837 perhaps due to the financial panic of that year. As early artists in Chicago they opened a studio and art gallery. While there they gave lessons to Samuel Marsden Brookes (1816-1892) whose family immigrated to the city from Great Britain in 1833. Brookes later set himself up as a professional portrait painter and is thought to be the first resident artist in Chicago. In August 1837 Bowman again exhibited his Dioramic View of the Interior of the Capuchin Chapel at Rome, having previously displayed it in Canada. For fifty cents Chicago residents could see this "fine specimen of art from 10 am to 5 pm at the City Saloon." Sometime after August, 1837 Bowman (with or without Stanley) went to Green Bay, Wisconsin where he painted the Secretary and Governor of the Wisconsin Territory. These two portraits, William B. Slaughter, and Henry Dodge, are now owned by the State Historical Society of Wisconsin where they are listed as being painted in 1836.

== Final move to Rochester and sudden death in May 1842 ==
By October, 1841, Bowman had moved on to Rochester, New York. Sometime after he left Detroit Bowman moved his wife to his hometown of Mercer, Pennsylvania as a son James Bryan Bowman was born in Mercer on February 14, 1838, and a second son, William Josi Xifie Bowman was born in 1840. Bowman established a studio in the Arcade in Rochester where he was well-liked in the community, and considered a particularly fine artist for having studied abroad. A Canadian artist, Cornelius Krieghoff was also painting in Rochester and probably due to common experiences in Canada, and a common interest in music, they became close friends. Bowman, with more painting experience, allowed Krieghoff to copy his portrait of Thorvaldsen and also one of a French notary. Krieghoff's copy of the Thorvaldsen portrait was offered at Parke-Bernet, New York March 14, 1968, but the present location of the painting is unknown. Krieghoff's copy of a second portrait which he titled Notary with a Red Skull Cap is owned by the Beaverbrook Art Gallery Fredericton, New Brunswick, Canada. A very similar portrait by Paul Kane is reported by Harper to be owned by Kane's descendants and is believed perhaps to also have a common source in a painting by Bowman. Now in a private collection, The Man in the Red Hat is an oil portrait by Bowman, which is most likely this common source.

Bowman's death on May 18, 1842, at 2 am was unexpected and seems to have shocked the community. His death was announced the next day in the Daily Advertiser with the headline "Sudden Death!" He died in his bed at the Mansion House after a "short but severe illness". An obituary was printed in the Mercer (PA) Luminary and reprinted in the Rochester Daily Democrat on June 1, 1842. Cornelius Krieghoff must have held Bowman in high esteem as on June 8, 1843, he announced in the Rochester Daily Democrat a five-day exhibition of paintings to raise money for a tombstone for his friend.

== Portraits painted ==
- William "Tiger" Dunlop
- Benedict Joseph Fenwick
- John Frothingham

== Paintings ==
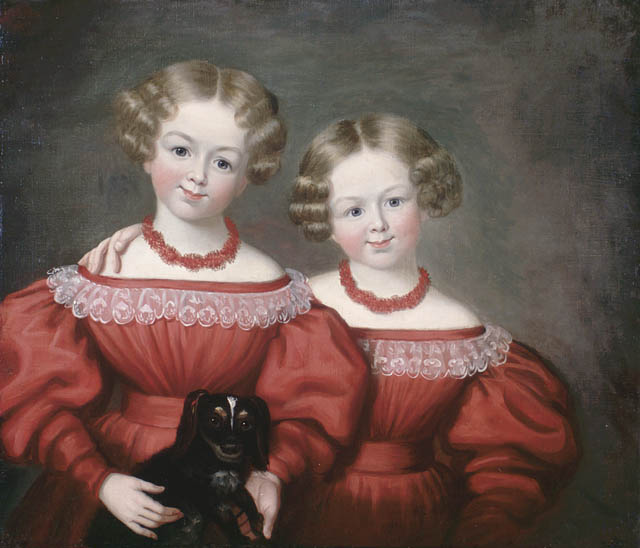
Céline and Rosalvina Pelletier. ca. 1838. Library and Archives Canada.

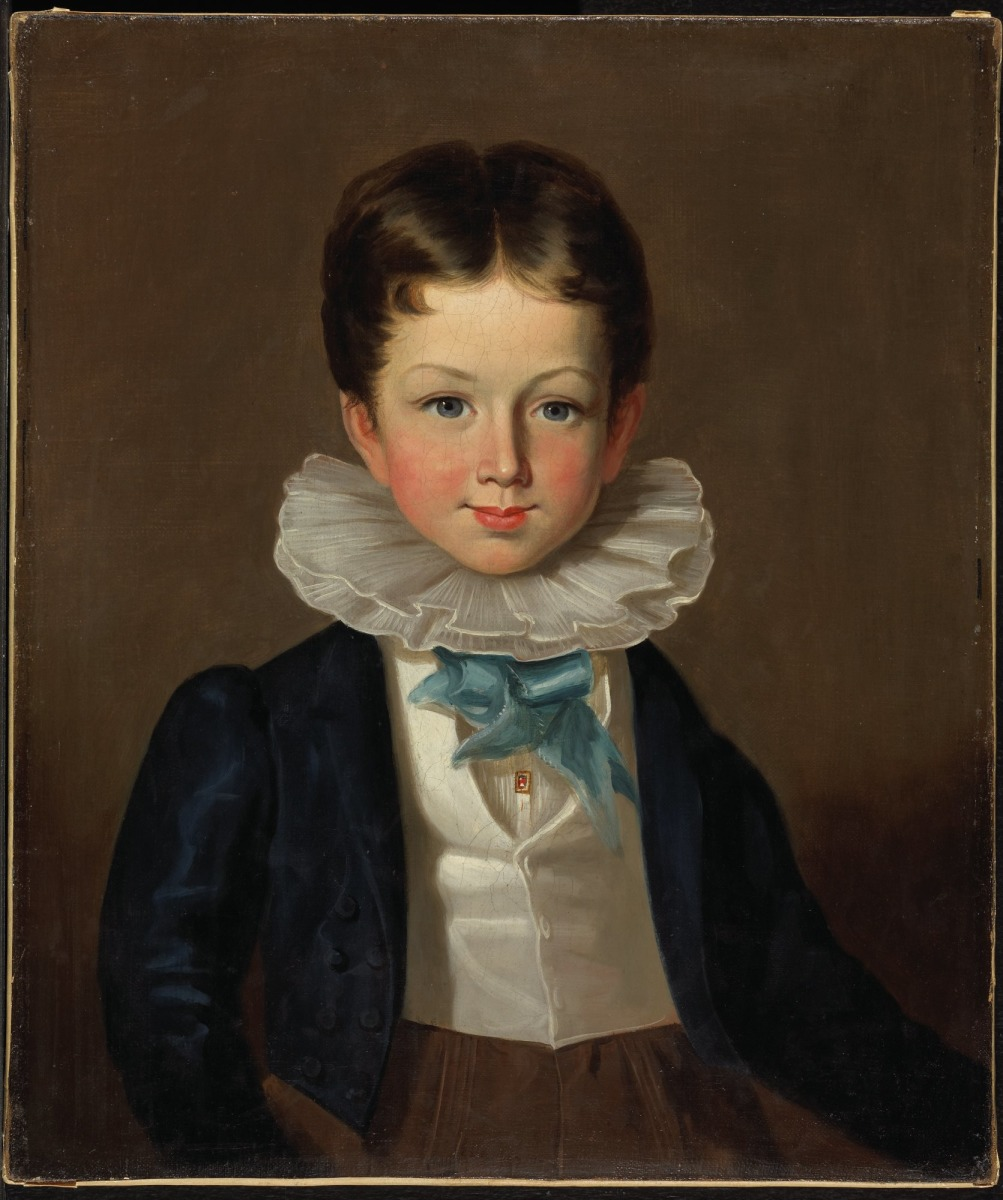
Portrait of Charles-Pierre Pelletier. ca. 1831-1833. National Gallery of Canada

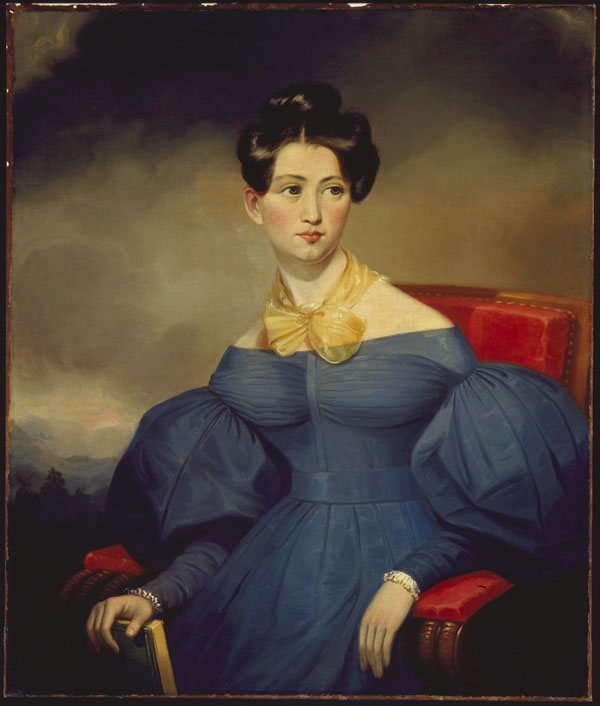
Portrait of Madame Louis-Victor Sicotte, née Marguerite-Emélie Starnes. ca. 1837. Library and Archives Canada.
