= John Devereux =

John Devereux may refer to:

- John Devereux, Lord of Munsley (c. 1253–1316), Anglo-Norman nobleman in the time of Edward I and Edward II of England
- John Devereux, 1st Baron Devereux (died 1393), peer in the reign of King Richard II of England
- John Devereux (died 1419), MP for Dorset
- John Devereux, 9th Baron Ferrers of Chartley (c. 1461–1501), English peer
- John C. Devereux (1774–1848), mayor of Utica, New York and noted Roman Catholic
- John Devereux (army officer) (1778–1860), Irish recruiter of troops for Simón Bolívar, Latin American diplomat, and confidence trickster
- John Devereux (politician) (born 1946), Australian politician
- John Patrick Devereux (born 1963), American soccer player
- John Devereux (rugby) (born 1966), Welsh rugby league and rugby union footballer and coach
- John Thomas Devereux (died 1885), member of the UK parliament for Wexford Borough, 1847–1859
- John Devereux (academic) (born 1965), Australian professor of law
- John Devereux (bishop), 16th-century religious leader in Ireland
- John Henry Devereux (1840–1920), American architect and builder

== See also ==
- John Devereux Ward (1925–2010), British Conservative Party politician
