= Baroniella =

Scientific classification
- Kingdom: Plantae
- Clade: Tracheophytes
- Clade: Angiosperms
- Clade: Eudicots
- Clade: Asterids
- Order: Gentianales
- Family: Apocynaceae
- Genus: Baroniella; Costantin & Gallaud

Genus of flowering plants

Baroniella is a genus of flowering plants belonging to the family Apocynaceae.

Its native range is Madagascar.

Species:

- Baroniella acuminata (Choux) Bullock
- Baroniella camptocarpoides Costantin & Gallaud
- Baroniella capillacea Klack.
- Baroniella collaris Klack.
- Baroniella effusa Klack.
- Baroniella ensifolia Klack.
- Baroniella linearifolia Klack.
- Baroniella linearis (Choux) Bullock
- Baroniella longicornis Klack.
- Baroniella multiflora (Choux) Bullock
