= Hoya nummularioides =

Scientific classification
- Kingdom: Plantae
- Clade: Embryophytes
- Clade: Tracheophytes
- Clade: Spermatophytes
- Clade: Angiosperms
- Clade: Eudicots
- Clade: Asterids
- Order: Gentianales
- Family: Apocynaceae
- Genus: Hoya
- Species: H. nummularioides

Binomial name
- Hoya nummularioides Costantin

Species of plant

Hoya nummularioides is a species of flowering plant in the family Apocynaceae. It is native to Thailand, Laos, Cambodia, and Vietnam. An epiphytic or lithophytic climber, it is typically found in the wet tropics. Drought tolerant for its genus, it is recommended for containers, hanging baskets, and aromatherapy gardens.
