= Deveaux =

Deveaux is a surname of French origin. Notable people with the surname include:

- André Deveaux (born 1984), Bahamian ice hockey player
- Andrew Deveaux (1758–1812), American Loyalist
- Gerry DeVeaux, Bahamian songwriter and producer
- Holly Deveaux, Canadian actress
- James DeVeaux (1812–1844), American painter
- Kevin Deveaux (born 1966), Canadian politician
- Orpha-F. Deveaux (1872–1933), American organist, pianist and music educator
- Monique Deveaux, Canadian philosopher
- Nikia Deveaux (born 1985), Bahamian swimmer
- Patricia Deveaux (born 1968), Bahamian politician
- Samuel DeVeaux (1789–1852), American judge and public official

Fictional characters:

- Charles Deveaux, character on Heroes
- Gabby Deveaux, character on The L Word
- Simone Deveaux, character on Heroes
- Rory Deveaux, protagonist in The Shades of London series

== See also ==
- Devereaux
- Devereux
