= J. Alphonse Deveau =

Canadian historian (1917–2004)

Jean Alphonse Deveau CM (1917 – 28 July 2004) was a Canadian historian from Nova Scotia known for his contributions to the study of Acadian history. He was the first director of the Acadian Centre at Université Sainte-Anne, and wrote more than 20 books across his career. He was invested as a Member of the Order of Canada in 1998.

== Biography ==
Deveau was born in 1917 to parents Augustin and Grace Deveau (née Belliveau). He attended Université Sainte-Anne in Pointe-de-l'Église, where he received his Bachelor of Arts. He earned his Master of Social Sciences from Université Laval in Quebec, an education diploma from Dalhousie University, and a French civilization diploma from the University of Paris.

Deveau taught in high schools in Clare and Argyle, and was principal at Sainte-Anne-du-Ruisseau High School and Clare High School. He taught Acadian history at Université Sainte-Anne, becoming the first director of the university's Acadian Centre in 1973.

In 1981, Deveau was awarded an honorary doctorate from Université Sainte-Anne. He was invested as a Member of the Order of Canada on 22 October 1998.

Recognized as an authority on Acadian history, Deveau wrote over 20 books on the subject over the course of his career. In the days leading up to his death, he was continuing to conduct research on the genealogy of the Deveau family. He died on 28 July 2004, at the age of 86.

== Publications ==
=== Books in English ===
- Deveau, J. Alphonse (1970). Diary of Cécile Murat: A Story of Saint Mary's Bay from 1795 to 1825. OCLC 43287822.
- — (1977). Along the Shores of Saint Mary's Bay: The First Hundred Years. Université Sainte-Anne. OCLC 911912573.
- — (1977). Along the Shores of Saint Mary's Bay: The Second Hundred Years. Université Sainte-Anne. OCLC 911912573.
- — (1980). Two Beginnings: A Brief Acadian History. Yarmouth, NS: Les Editions Lescarbot. OCLC 7455690.
- —; Ross, Sally (1992). The Acadians of Nova Scotia: Past and Present. Halifax, NS: Nimbus Publishing. ISBN 978-1-5510-9012-2. OCLC 25713218.

=== Books in French ===
- Deveau, J. Alphonse (1980). Journal de Cécile Murat (4 ed.). Les Editions Lescarbot: Yarmouth, NS. OCLC 43287565.
- — (1980). Le Chef des Acadiens. Yarmouth, NS: Les Editions Lescarbot. OCLC 39051589.
- — (1983). Clare, LaVille française. Yarmouth, NS: Les Editions Lescarbot. ISBN 978-0-9214-4313-1. OCLC 15965749.
- — (1983). L'abbé Le Loutre et les Acadiens. Agincourt, ON: Société canadienne du livre limitée. ISBN 978-0-7725-5406-2. OCLC 39093790.
- — (1983). Histoire de la paroisse Saint-Vincent-de-Paul et de la Rivière-aux-Saumons. OCLC 44019087.
- —; Ross, Sally (1995). Les Acadiens de la Nouvelle-Ecosse: hier et aujourd'hui. Moncton, NB: Editions d'Acadie. ISBN 2-7600-0263-2. OCLC 35673733.

=== Translations ===
- Bourneuf, François Lambert (1990). Deveau, J. Alphonse (ed.). Diary of a Frenchman: François Lambert Bourneuf's Adventures from France to Acadia, 1787–1871. Halifax, NS: Nimbus Publishing. ISBN 978-0-9210-5442-9. OCLC 38752646.
