= Albert Maige =

French botanist (1872–1943)

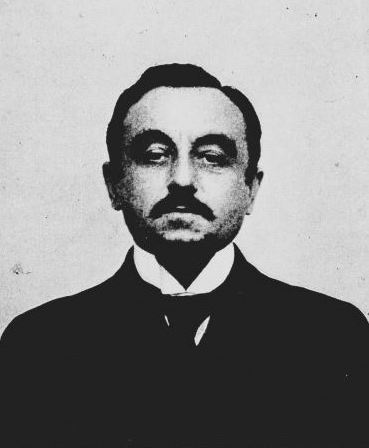
- Born: 26 November 1872; Auxonne, Côte-d'Or, Bourgogne-Franche-Comté, France
- Died: 29 November 1943 (aged 71)
- Education: École normale supérieure
- Occupation: Botanist
- Spouse(s): Hélène Maige Georgette Binsse (m. 1901, died) Lucie Cerrou

Albert Maige (26 November 1872 – 29 November 1943) was a French botanist. Among his works was on the forest flora of Algeria. A major contribution was on the synthesis, movement and storage of starch examining the role of the leucoplast, and the enzymes involved in amylolysis in the cytoplasm.

== Life and work ==
Maige was born in Auxonne, Côte d'Or. After the death of his father, a hairdresser, at young age, he and his brother were taken care of by their mother alone. With scholarships he studied at Auxonne, Dijon and received a bachelor's degree in 1889 (aged 17) and went to join university after a year in military service. He graduated in science in 1895 from the Ecole Normale Supérieure and worked in the lab of Gaston Bonnier at Fontainebleau-Avon. He studied climbing plants and the effect of light and obtained a doctorate in 1900. He taught botany at Algiers and married Georgette Binsse in 1901. In 1911 he headed the botany department at the faculty of science of Poitiers. He was conscripted in 1914 and demobilized in 1919. His wife died following a thyroid surgery and he then left Poitiers and moved to Lille, exchanging his position with Professor Ricôme. Here he married Lucie Cerrou, a teacher. He then began to study legume embryos and the nature of the amyloplast while also examining the chromosomes of coastal plants. He helped the agriculture department establish a seed testing laboratory. In 1924 he became dean at Lille. During the German invasion of 1940, he helped move the university to Le Touquet. He died in 1942 after suffering from asthma and fits of coughing.

His older daughter Hélène Maige (from his first marriage) became the first woman to hold the position of an assistant in the botany laboratory at Lille in 1937. She then studied pharmacy, graduating in 1927 and married Maurice Hocquette, one of the students of her father. She continued to work at the faculty of science in Lille until 1966.
