= Deveraux =

Deveraux is a surname, derived from the Norman French Devereux (likely influenced by the common English pronunciation of that name, "Devero"). Notable people with the surname include:

- James Deveraux (1903–1988), United States Marine Corps general, Navy Cross recipient, and Republican congressman
- Jude Deveraux (born 1947), American author

Fictional characters:

- Abigail Deveraux, character on the NBC daytime drama Days of our Lives
- Blanche Deveraux, character on the 1985–1992 NBC sitcom The Golden Girls
- Dominique Deveraux, character on the American TV series Dynasty and its spin-off The Colbys
- Floyd Devereaux, character on the movie Big Gold Brick, played by Andy García.
- Jack Deveraux, character on the NBC daytime drama Days of our Lives
- Jeannette Deveraux, Wing Commander character
- JJ Deveraux, character on the NBC daytime drama Days of our Lives
- Luc Deveraux, the protagonist of the Universal Soldier film series

== See also ==
- Devara
- Devereaux
- Devereux
- Deverra
- Dovera
