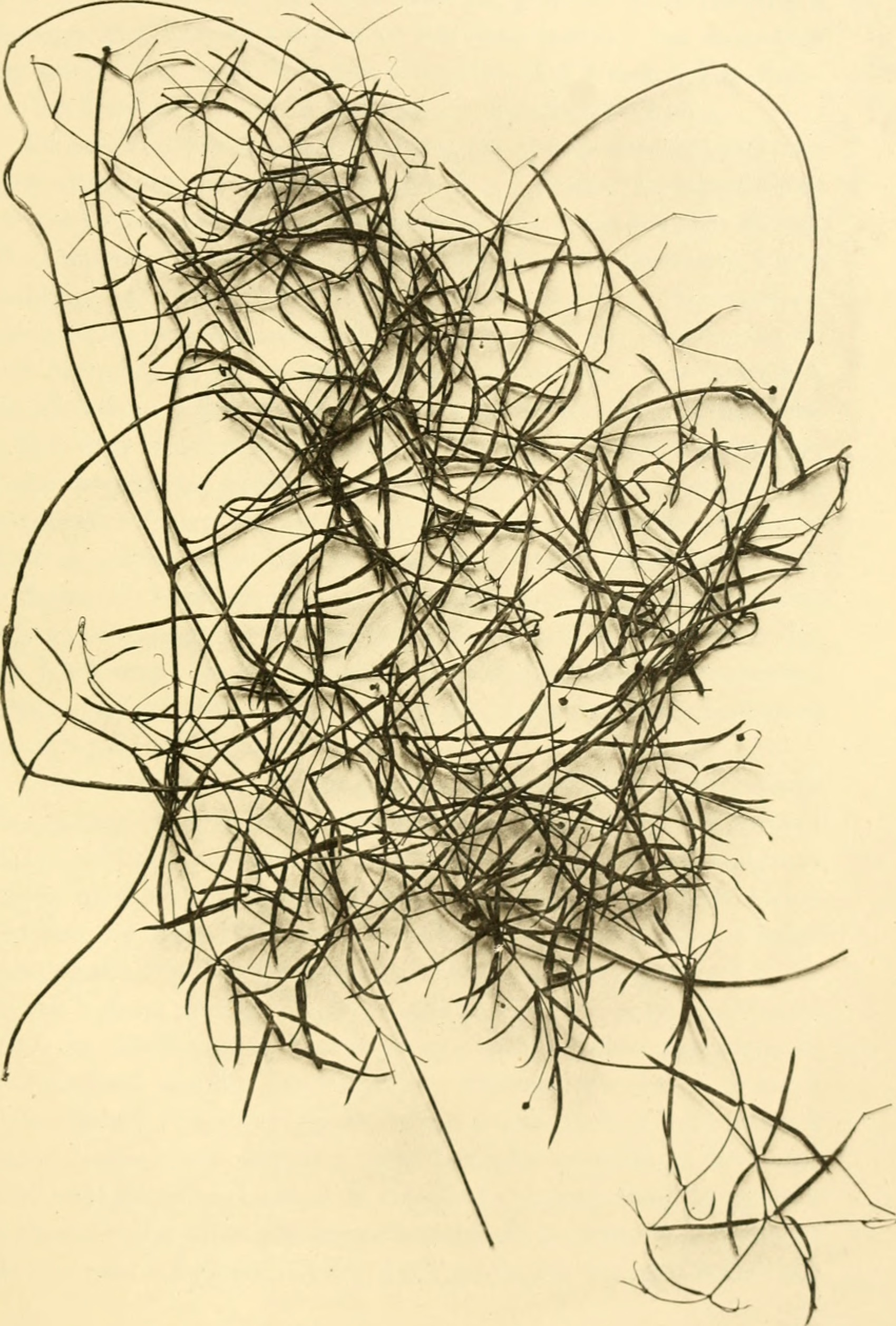
- Photograph of Baroniella linearis, titled using the synonym Baseonema lineare

Conservation status
- Vulnerable (IUCN 3.1)

Scientific classification
- Kingdom: Plantae
- Clade: Tracheophytes
- Clade: Angiosperms
- Clade: Eudicots
- Clade: Asterids
- Order: Gentianales
- Family: Apocynaceae
- Genus: Baroniella
- Species: B. linearis

Binomial name
- Baroniella linearis (Choux) Bullock

Synonyms
- Baseonema lineare Choux

= Baroniella linearis =

Species of flowering plant

Baroniella linearis is a species of plant in the Apocynaceae family. It is endemic to Madagascar. Pierre Choux, the botanist who first formally described the species using the synonym Baseonema lineare, named it after its narrow (linearis in Latin) leaves.

== Description ==
It is twining plant that is woody only at the base of its stem. The hairless, narrow, linear to slightly oval leaves are 20–35 by 1–5 millimeters. The tips of the leaves pointed to gradually pointed. The bases have a cut-off to gradually narrowing shape. The leaves' midribs are distinctively raised on top and impressed below. Its petioles are 0.5 millimeters long. Its branched Inflorescences are 2–3.5 centimeters long. Each inflorescence has one or two flowers. Each flower is on a pedicel that is 3–5 millimeters long. The pedicels have bracts that are up to 0.5 millimeter long. Its flowers have 5 broadly oval sepals that are 0.6–0.9 by 0.6–0.9 millimeters, with pointed tips and margins that have fine hairs. Its 5 violet petals are fused at the base forming a 1–1.2 millimeter long tube. The free, oblong lobes of the petals are 2.4–3 by 2–2.7 millimeters. The tips of the petals are rounded. The flowers have a structure between the petals and the stamens called a corona. Its corona forms a short undulating ring with lobes between the stamens that are 0.3–0.4 millimeters high with rounded to cut-off tops, as well as lobes opposite the stamens that radiate toward the petals. The flowers have 5 stamen with rectangular anthers and filaments that are 0.2 millimeters long. The connective tissue between the compartments of the anther forms an extended cap less than half as long as the anther. The flowers have a pistil that is 0.7 millimeters long with disc shaped stigma. The stigma has 5 lobes have a spreading shape and are bent downwards. Each stigma lobe bears a structure called a pollen carrier. The pollen carriers are 0.2 millimeter long with an oval to rounded spathe without a stalk.

=== Reproductive biology ===
The pollen of Baroniella linearis is shed as permanent tetrads.

=== Distribution and habitat ===
It has been observed growing in transition zones between rain forests and plateaus at elevations of 800 to 1200 meters.
