= Baroniella capillacea =

Scientific classification
- Kingdom: Plantae
- Clade: Tracheophytes
- Clade: Angiosperms
- Clade: Eudicots
- Clade: Asterids
- Order: Gentianales
- Family: Apocynaceae
- Genus: Baroniella
- Species: B. capillacea

Binomial name
- Baroniella capillacea Klack.

Species of flowering plant

Baroniella capillacea is a species of plant in the Apocynaceae family. It is endemic to Madagascar. Jens Klackenberg, the botanist who first formally described the species, named it after very narrow or thread-like (capillaceus in Latin) leaves.

== Description ==
It is twining plant that is woody only at the base of its stem. The hairless, very narrow, linear leaves are 15–25 by 0.5 millimeters. The tips of the leaves are pointed and their margins are folded upwards at the base. The bases have a cut-off to gradually narrowing shape. Its petioles are 0.5–1 millimeters long. Its Inflorescences are 1–2 centimeters long. The inflorescences usually have 1 can have up to 3 flowers. Each flower is on a pedicel that is 4–7 millimeters long. The pedicels have bracts that are up to 0.5 millimeter long. Its flowers have 5 broadly oval sepals that are 0.8–1 by 0.8–1 millimeters, with rounded tips and finely haired margins. Its 5 violet petals are fused at the base forming a 0.5–0.7 millimeter long tube. The free, oval lobes of the petals are 3.7–4.0 by 2.0–2.3 millimeters. The tips of the petals are rounded. The flowers have a structure between the petals and the stamens called a corona. Its corona forms a short undulating ring with lobes between the stamens that are 0.4–0.5 millimeters high with rounded to truncated tops, as well as rectangular lobes opposite the stamens that are about the same size. The flowers have 5 stamen with rectangular anthers and filaments that are 0.2 millimeters long. The connective tissue between the compartments of the anther form an extended cap less than half as long as the anther. The flowers have a pistil that is 0.9 millimeters high with a disc shaped stigma. The stigma has 5 lobes that are slightly bent backwards. Each lobe bears a structure called a pollen carrier. The pollen carriers 0.2 millimeter long with an oval spathe and no stalk.

=== Reproductive biology ===
The pollen of Baroniella capillacea is shed as permanent tetrads.

=== Distribution and habitat ===
It has been observed growing in mountainous habitat at elevations of 1000 to 1480 meters.
