= Paul Becquerel =

French biologist (1879–1955)

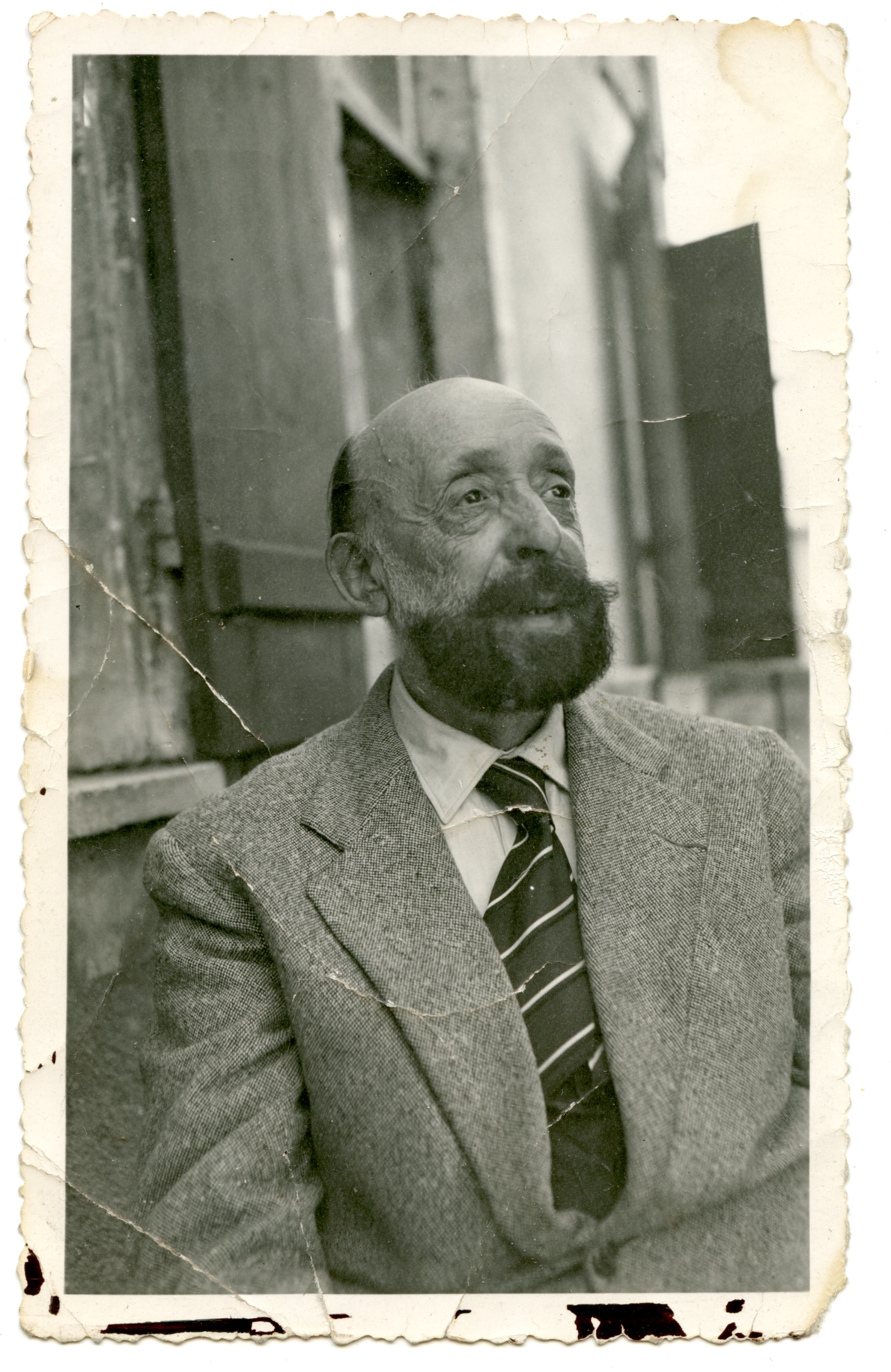
Image of Paul Becquerel

Paul Becquerel (14 April 1879 – 22 June 1955) was a French biologist who studied seeds, their metabolism, and viability. He was a nephew of the physicist Henri Becquerel and taught at the Faculty of Sciences in Nancy and at the University of Poitiers.

Becquerel was the son of farmer André Paul Becquerel (1856-1904). Paul was a grandson of Edmond Becquerel and a nephew of Henri Becquerel. He studied science in Paris in 1903 and obtained a doctorate in 1907. He taught at Nancy and then at the University of Poitiers. He began to study the viability of cells and demonstrated that spores and seeds became resistant after losing water and that rehydration could revive them.

Paul Becquerel had studied under Gaston Bonnier in Paris. Bonnier had refused to accept the evolution of life from inorganic matter and considered the idea of seeding from outer space as a more plausible origin of life. Becquerel experimented with bacteria, fungal spores and seeds to test if they could withstand the conditions of space such as radiation and concluded that panspermia could not be supported. Becquerel tested the viability of seeds obtained from French museums. He was able to germinate seeds of Cassia multijuga (now Senna multijuga) which was 158 years old.

== Major publications ==
Becquerel's most widely cited publications include:

- Becquerel P (1906): "Sur la respiration des graines à l’état de vie latente. Compte rendu des Séances de l’Académie des Sciences", 143:974-977
- Becquerel P (1906): "Sur la nature de la vie latente des graines et sur les véritables caractères de la vie". Compte rendu des Séances de l’Académie des Sciences", 143:1177-1179.
- Becquerel P (1907): "Recherches sur la vie latente des graines" Dissertation, University of Paris.
- Becquerel P (1909): "Sur la suspension de la vie chez certaines graines. Compte rendu des Séances de l’Académie des Sciences", 148:1052-54.
- Becquerel P (1910): "Recherches expérimentales sur la vie latente des spores Mucorinées et Ascomycètes. Compte rendu des Séances de l’Académie des Sciences", 150:1437-1439
- Becquerel P (1910): "L’action abiotique de l’ultraviolet et l’hypothèse de l’origine cosmique de la vie. Compte rendu des Séances de l’Académie des Sciences", 151:86-88
