= Agnes Pockels =

German chemist (1862–1935)

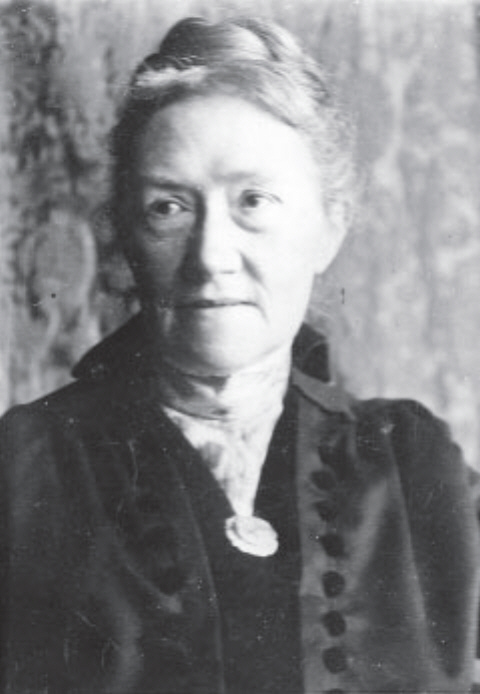
- Born: 14 February 1862; Venice, Lombardy–Venetia, Austrian Empire
- Died: 21 November 1935 (aged 73); Brunswick, Germany
- Citizenship: German
- Known for: Pioneer of surface science
- Awards: Laura Leonard Award
- Scientific career
- Fields: Chemistry/Physics

Agnes Luise Wilhelmine Pockels (14 February 1862 – 21 November 1935) was a German scientist, whose pioneering research was fundamental in establishing the modern discipline known as surface science, which describes the properties of liquid and solid surfaces and interfaces.

Pockels became interested in fundamental research in surface science through observations of soaps and soapy water in her own home while washing dishes. She devised a surface film balance technique to study the behavior of molecules such as soaps and surfactants at air-liquid interfaces. From these studies, Pockels defined the "Pockels point" which is the minimum area that a single molecule can occupy in monomolecular films.

== Early life and education ==
Pockels was born in Venice in 1862. At the time, Venice was part of the Kingdom of Lombardy–Venetia, a part of the Austrian Empire, and Pockels' father served in the Austrian Army. When he fell sick, the family moved in 1871 to Brunswick, which was part of the nascent German Empire. There, Pockels attended the Municipal High School for Girls. Agnes was interested in science as a child. However, women were not allowed to enter universities to study. Pockels stated that "I had a passionate interest in natural science, especially physics, and would have liked to study“..

Pockels studied science at home while caring for her parents. Pockels' younger brother Friedrich Carl Alwin Pockels studied physics at the University of Göttingen, completing his degree there. Friedrich shared textbooks from the university with Agnes Pockels in order to help her study from home. He later shared academic literature with Agnes Pockels to advance her studies.

== Scientific investigations ==
=== Initial findings ===
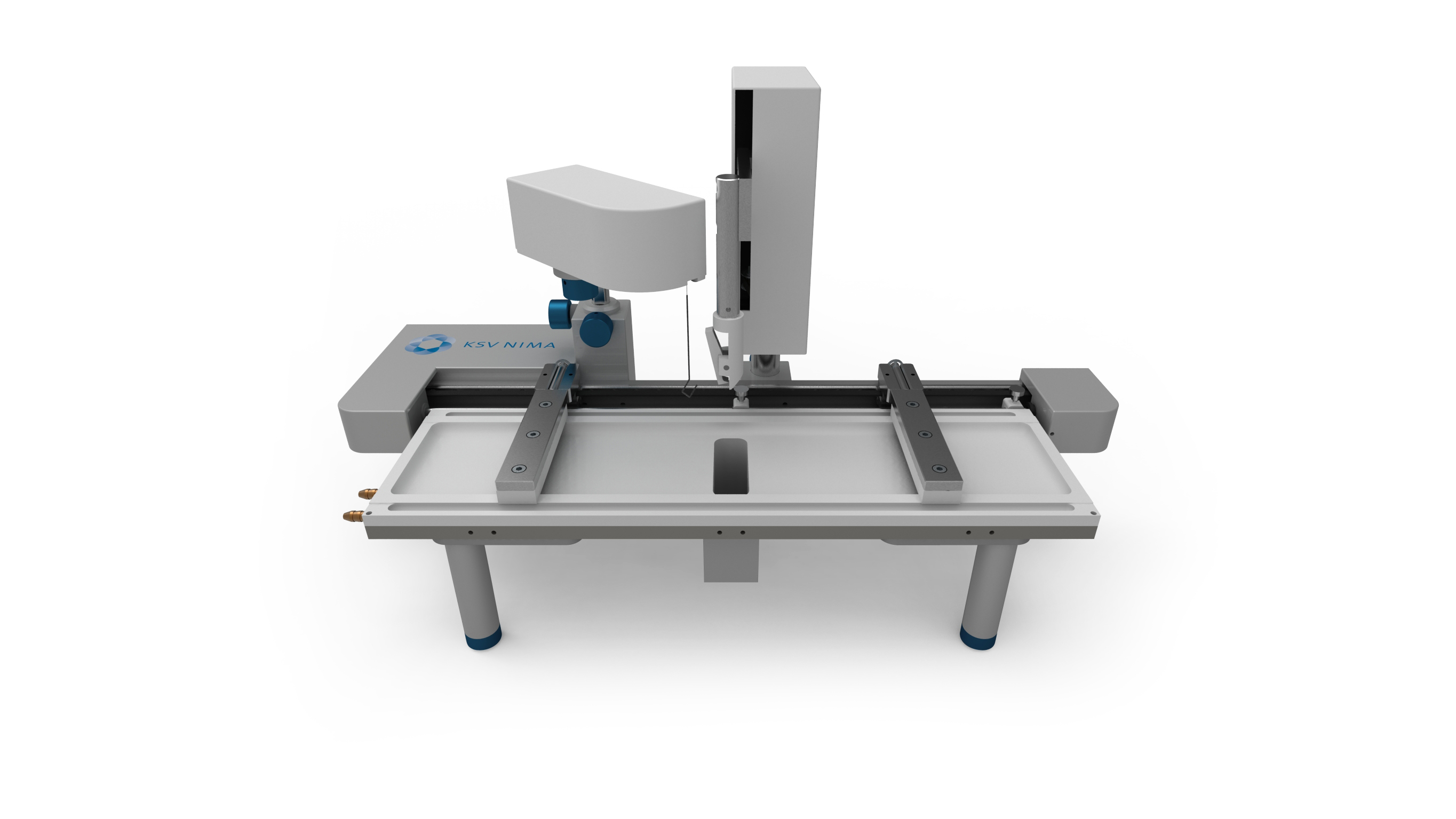
Langmuir–Blodgett trough Pockels' sliding trough was a forerunner of the modern Langmuir–Blodgett trough.

Through her experiences carrying out domestic chores, especially dishwashing, Pockels became interested in the effect of soaps on water and more generally on the effect of impurities on water and soapy water. By age 18, she began conducting experiments in her home to understand the physical properties of water and impurities.

As a result of her interests, by age 20, Pockels devised a slide trough for making quantitative measurements on the surface properties of soapy water and related substances. Specifically, this consisted of a trough, made of metal and rectangular in shape, roughly 70 centimeters (cm) long, 5cm wide, and 2cm deep. The trough was filled with water. A metal strip of about 1.5cm width was laid on top of the water across the width of the trough so as to divide the surface of the water in two parts. There was a ruler along the length of the trough so that the position of the metal strip, and therefore the surface area of each of the two parts of the trough, could be determined as the strip was moved along the length of the trough.

Pockels further developed her apparatus by placing a small disk (typically 6 millimeters in diameter), such as a button, on the surface of the water in the trough. She then used a weighing scale (typically an apothecary's balance) to determine the force (weight) necessary to lift the disk from the water. By comparing the forces required to lift the disk from pure water to water containing impurities, she devised a direct measure of surface tension. This apparatus enabled her to investigate the surface forces of mono-molecular films, the surface tension of emulsions and solutions, the effect of impurities on the physical properties of water, and providing an understanding of surfactancy.

Pockels' sliding trough design built on the prior findings of Ludwig Wilhelmy's plate method of measuring surface tension. Pockels' design influenced later investigators who improved on the method, leading to the modern Langmuir–Blodgett trough which is in extensive use in colloid and surface science in contemporary times.

=== Pockels' point determination ===
Pockels used her sliding trough to evaluate the effect of small amounts of impurities on water. These impurities were typically household substances such as oils and soaps. With her apparatus, she measured the surface tension as the amount of force required to remove the disk from the surface of the water. Pockels found that small amounts of impurities could have a large effect on the surface tension of water, compared to pure water.

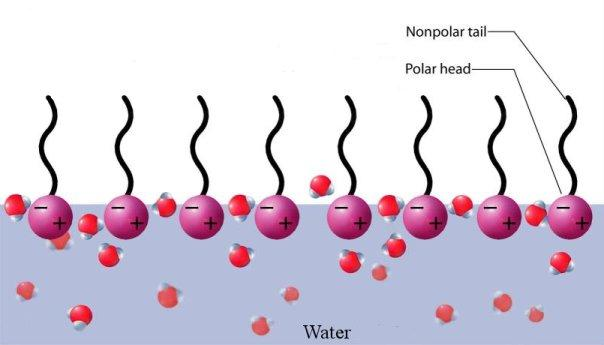
Schematic showing surfactant molecules (soaps) on the surface of water

In particular, Pockels studied soapy water. Soaps are examples of surfactants, which are molecules which have a hydrophilic portion of the molecule, while the remainder is hydrophobic. These are insoluble in the water and tend to reside on the surface of the water. When placing small amounts of the surfactants in her sliding trough, Pockels found that the effect on surface tension was small. However, once the slider on the surface of the trough passed a certain point, the effect on surface tension was large. When she plotted the surface tension on one axis of a graph compared to the position of the slider on her sliding trough, the graphical representation was a compression isotherm.

Using her knowledge of chemistry, Pockels realised that the point of the compression isotherm at which the surface tension changes abruptly is the point at which a film of surfactant molecules that is continuous and one molecule thick is formed. This is a monolayer of the surfactant. Pockels further found that this threshold point is the same for a variety of surfactant soaps. Since she knew how much surfactant was in her sliding trough as well as the area covered by the monolayer film, she could calculate the area on the surface of the water occupied by single molecule. She calculated this area to be 20 square angstroms (20 Å^{2}). Later, as her investigations became known in the scientific community, this area determined by the sliding trough became known as the Pockels Point.

=== First publication ===
In 1891, approximately ten years after Pockels' first surface tension measurements, through her brother Friedrich Pockels, she became aware that Lord Rayleigh was publishing studies of the effect of small amounts of oils on the surface of water. It was clear to her that Lord Rayleigh's research was closely related to her own. At the encouragement of her brother, Agnes Pockels wrote to Lord Rayleigh to describe her apparatus, her findings, and the fact that she was unable to publish her findings in the scientific journals of the time. Pockels' original correspondence with Rayleigh was in the German language and was translated for Rayleigh by his wife Evelyn (née Balfour). In an act of true scientific ethical behaviour, Rayleigh forwarded Pockels' findings to the journal Nature with a suitable cover letter to enable Pockels' findings to be published. Her first paper was "Surface Tension," describing her measurements and findings with her sliding trough.

The letter to Lord Rayleigh was described in a 1971 journal article on the origin of the surface film balance as being "a landmark in the history of surface chemistry". Lord Rayleigh retained his correspondence, and Pockels’s letter to him dated 10 January 1891 began:

"My Lord, – Will you kindly excuse my venturing to trouble you with a German letter on a scientific subject? Having heard of the fruitful researches carried on by you last year on the hitherto little understood properties of water surfaces, I thought it might interest you to know of my own observations on the subject. For various reasons I am not in a position to publish them in scientific periodicals, and I therefore adopt this means of communicating to you the most important of them."

The body of Pockels's letter to Rayleigh then described her sliding trough method, her initial findings, and her assessment of the limitations of her experimental methods. The closing of her letter stated:

"I thought I ought not to withhold from you these facts which I have observed, although I am not a professional physicist; and again begging you to excuse my boldness, I remain, with sincere respect,
Yours faithfully,
(signed) Agnes Pockels"

Lord Rayleigh forwarded Pockels's correspondence to the editor of the journal Nature, with a covering letter dated 2 March 1891. The editor at the time was Sir Joseph Norman Lockyer who chose to publish the correspondence from Rayleigh and Pockels. The covering letter stated:

"I shall be obliged if you can find space for the accompanying translation of an interesting letter which I have received from a German lady, who with very homely appliances has arrived at valuable results respecting the behaviour of contaminated water surfaces. The earlier part of Miss Pockels' letter covers nearly the same ground as some of my own recent work, and in the main harmonises with it. The later sections seem to me very suggestive, raising, if they do not fully answer, many important questions. I hope soon to find opportunity for repeating some of Miss Pockels' experiments".

Ostwald's biography of Pockels reports that Pockels had initially approached physicists at the University of Göttingen about her findings and received no expression of interest.

=== Later career ===
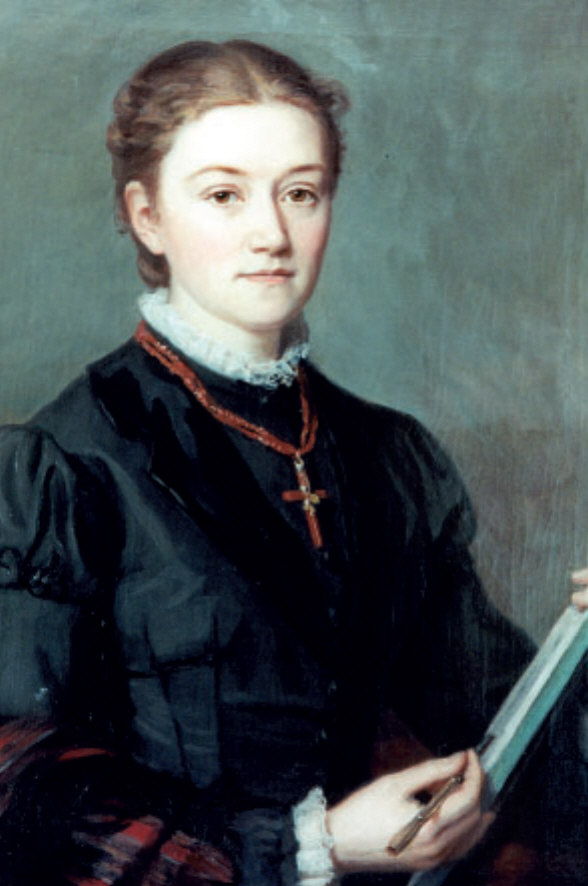
Pockels circa 1892

Following the first publication, Pockels' studies of surface films accelerated. She continued to correspond with Lord Rayleigh. These communications emphasised her findings concerning the importance of purity and cleanliness of the equipment, including a recognition of difficulties in her own experimentation regarding previously unrecognised contamination.

Pockels pointed out that even airborne dust can affect results with her experimental apparatus. She recognised that impurities can affect reproducibility of experimental findings. Pockels developed a refined method of assessing monolayer films consisting of deposition of the compound of interest as a solution in benzene on the water surface in her sliding trough. Through this line of experimentation, she measured the thickness of certain monolayer films as being 13Å. With the aid of Lord Rayleigh, Pockels's second publication appeared in the journal Nature in 1892.

Pockels described the calming effect that oils can have on bodies of water, an effect first investigated in the published literature by Benjamin Franklin. Her research extended to investigations of other surface phenomena including capillarity and contact angles.

Pockels published 14 scientific papers, mostly in German journals, the last one being published in 1926. She was eventually recognised as a pioneer in the emerging field of surface science. Following the death of her brother, Friedrich Carl Alwin Pockels in 1913 and her own ill health, Agnes Pockels lost contact with many professional scientists and ceased to undertake original research.

Pockels never received a formal appointment for her scientific endeavors. Nevertheless, she published a number of scholarly papers and eventually received recognition as a pioneer in the new field of surface science. Commentators wrote: "When Langmuir received the Nobel Prize for Chemistry in 1932, for his work in investigating monolayers on solids and on liquids, part of his achievement was [...] founded on original experiments first made with a button and a thin tray, by a young lady of 18 who had had no formal scientific training".

== Personal life ==
Pockels spent much of her life caring for her sick parents, which she noted to be "very challenging". Her father died in 1906 and her mother died in 1914. By that time, Pockels herself was in ill health, necessitating a stay for a time in a sanatorium. She travelled in Europe for enjoyment. During Pockels' later years, she was known for her role as an aunt, "Auntie Agnes".

Pockels died in 1935 in Brunswick, Germany, in the town where she had lived for the duration of her career.

== Awards and legacy ==
External media
- Media related to Agnes Pockels

Images
- Photograph of a shift trough, (German: Schieberinne) of the type designed by Pockels for surface tension measurements
- Mid-career portrait of Agnes Pockels

Video
- A video biography of Agnes Pockels, including a demonstration of surface tension measurement using a Pockels trough

In 1931, together with Henri Devaux, Pockels received the Laura R. Leonard Prize from the Colloid Society. In the following year, the Braunschweig University of Technology granted her an honorary doctorate, the first woman to receive such an award.

Using an improved version of the slide trough, American chemist Irving Langmuir made additional discoveries on the properties of surface molecules, which earned him a Nobel Prize in chemistry in 1932. Pockels' device is a direct antecedent of the Langmuir–Blodgett trough, developed later by Langmuir and physicist Katharine Blodgett.

Since 1993, the Technical University Braunschweig has awarded the Agnes Pockels Medal to people who have advanced the Technical University Braunschweig, emphasising those who have promoted teaching and research, especially women.

The Agnes Pockels Laboratory was established at the Technical University Braunschweig in 2002. Its purpose is to foster chemical education, aid chemistry teachers, and encourage young children in the pursuit of the natural sciences. It emphasises children under the age of 10, especially girls. In this laboratory, children experience learning-by-doing, much like a craft, without theoretical knowledge or advanced instrumentation.

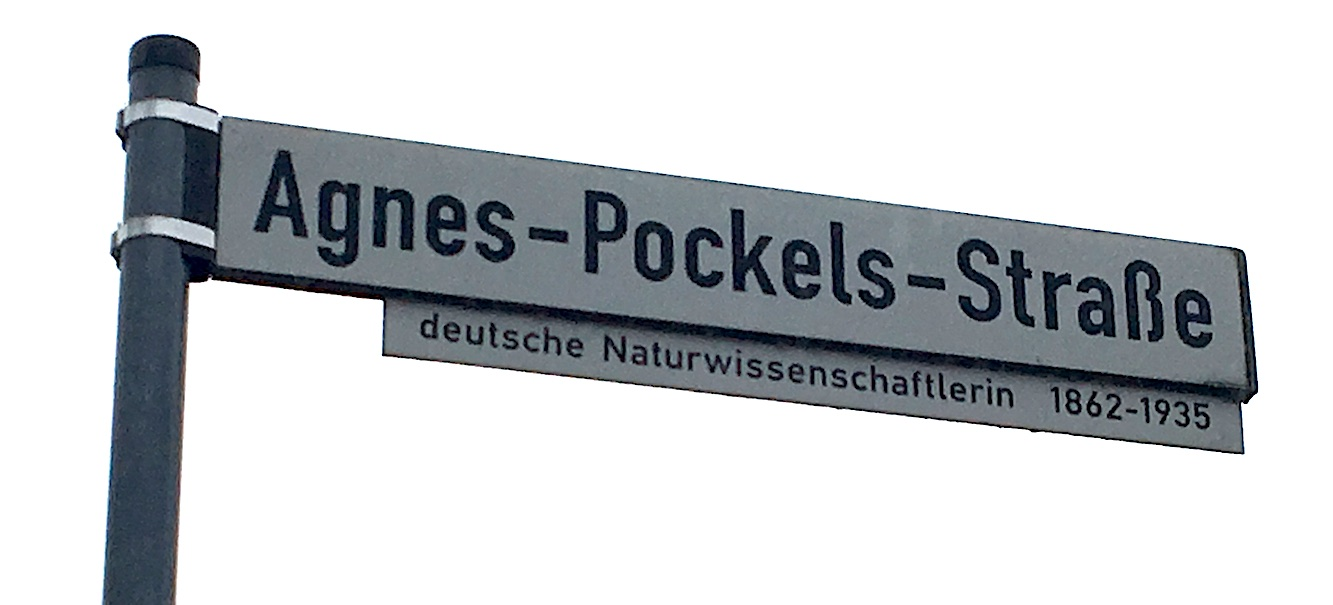
Agnes-Pockels-Strasse in Hilden

Lord Rayleigh kept the correspondence he received from Pockels and her brother Friedrich Pockels. Pockels maintained a diary. These documents and photographs of the Pockels family were retained in the library of the Royal Society of Chemistry at Burlington House. On the occasion of Pockels' 70th birthday in 1932, German colloid chemist Wolfgang Ostwald published a biography of Pockels. The Ostwald article includes a list of her publication and a summary of several of them. It also includes autobiographical passages from Pockels. Her sister-in-law Elisabeth (the wife of Friedrich Pockels) also published a biography of Pockels, emphasising her personal life.

A street, Agnes-Pockels-Straße, is named in her honour in Hilden in North Rhine-Westphalia.

== Publications ==
- "Surface Tension", (1891) Nature, 46, 437.
- "On the relative contamination of the water-surface by equal quantities of different substances", (1892) Nature 47, 418.
- "Relations between the surface tension and relative contamination of water surfaces", (1893) Nature, 48, 152.
- "On the spreading of oil upon water", (1894) Nature 50, 223.
- "Beobachtungen über die Adhäsion verschiedener Flüssigkeiten an Glas", (Observations about the Adhesion of Different Liquids on Glass), (1898) Naturwissenschaftliche Rundschau, 14, 190.
- "Randwinkel gesättigter Lösungen an Kristallen" (Contact Angles of Saturated Solutions on Crystals), (1899), Naturwissenschaftliche Rundschau, 14, 383.
- "Untersuchungen von Grenzflächenspannungen mit der Cohäsionswaage", (Investigations of the Surface Tension with the Cohesion Balance), (1899) Annalen der Physik, 67, 668.
- "Über das spontane Sinken der Oberflächenspannung von Wasser, wässerigen Lösungen und Emulsionen"', (On the Spontaneous Decrease of the Surface Tension of Water, Aqueous Solutions and Emulsions), (1902) Annalen der Physik, 8, 854.
- "Über Randwinkel und Ausbreitung von Flüssigkeiten auf festen Körpern" (On Contact Angles and the Flow of Fluids on Solid Bodies), (1914) Physikalische Zeitschrift, 15, 39.
- "Zur Frage der zeitlichen Veränderung der Oberflächenspannun"' (On the Changes of the Surface Tension with Time), (1916) Physikalische Zeitschrift, 17, 141
- "Über die Ausbreitung reiner und gemischter Flüssigkeiten auf Wasser" (On the Spreading of Pure and Mixed Liquids on Water) (1916) Physikalische Zeitschrift, 17, 142.
- "Die Anomalie der Wasseroberfläche" (The Anomalous State of the Water Surface) (1917) Die Naturwissenschaften, 5, 137 u. 149.
- "Zur Frage der Ölflecke auf Seen" (On Oil Stains on Lakes) (1918) Die Naturwissenschaften, 6, 118.
- "The measurement of surface tension with the balance" (1926) Science 64, 304.

== See also ==
- Timeline of women in science
