= Devereaux =

Devereaux is a variation of the surname Devereux based on the common English pronunciation /ˈdɛvəroʊ/. It may refer to:

== People ==
- Boyd Devereaux (born 1978), Canadian hockey player
- Ed Devereaux (1925–2003), Australian actor
- James P.S. Devereaux, American military officer and U.S. Congressman
- Jarboe La Salle Devereaux, American experimental musician
- Maurice Devereaux, Canadian director
- Mike Devereaux (born 1963), American baseball player
- Yvette Devereaux, American conductor
- Philip James Devereaux, Canadian cardiologist
- Stacie Devereaux (born 1986), curler from St. John's, Newfoundland and Labrador.
- Tricia Devereaux (born 1975), American former pornographic actress
- Minnie Devereaux (1891–1984), American silent film actress nicknamed "Indian Minnie" and "Minnie Ha-ha"

== Fictional characters ==
- Ben and Violet Devereaux, in the 2005 film The Skeleton Key
- Blanche Devereaux, on The Golden Girls
- Clark "Mouth" Devereaux, in the 1985 film The Goonies
- Diana Devereaux, from the satire musical Of Thee I Sing
- Earl Devereaux, in the films Cloudy with a Chance of Meatballs and Cloudy with a Chance of Meatballs 2
- Jonathan Devereaux in Double Jeopardy, a 1999 film
- Matt Devereaux, played by Spencer Tracy, in the 1954 film Broken Lance
- Nicholas Devereaux, Princess Mia's lover in Princess Diaries 2
- Peter Devereaux, main protagonist in the 2014 film The November Man
- Rupert Devereaux, fictional British Prime Minister in the Bartimaeus Trilogy
- Sophie Devereaux, on the television series Leverage
- Sophie Devereaux, Jane-Anne Devereaux and Monique Devereaux, on the television series The Originals
- Father Tim Devereaux, on the Irish television series Glenroe
- Major General William Devereaux on The Siege
- Devereaux sisters, from the Dark-Hunter paranormal romance series
- Devereaux, a character from the 2025 album The Scholars by Car Seat Headrest

== See also ==
- Deveraux, a list of people and fictional characters with the surname
