= John C. Devereux =

American politician (1774–1848)

7th Mayor of Utica
- In office 1839–1841
- Preceded by: Charles P. Kirkland
- Succeeded by: Spencer Kellogg

Personal details
- Born: John Corish Devereux; August 5, 1774 Enniscorthy, County Wexford, Ireland
- Died: December 11, 1848 (aged 74) Utica, New York, U.S.

John C. Devereux (5 August 1774 – 1848) was a pioneering Irish Catholic in Utica, New York and its first elected mayor. "A settler of 1802 and a very prince among his fellows was John C. Devereux whose honourable career and many deeds of charity left behind him a memory as verdant as that of the green isle whence he came."

== Family ==
John Corish Devereux came from a patriotic and pious family, and was a son of Thomas and Catherine Corish Devereux. Originally of Norman French extraction, they were wealthy and well connected, and lived at ease on their handsome estate, "The Leap", at Davidstown, near Enniscorthy. They sympathized warmly with and took an aggressive part in the agitations preceding the Irish Rebellion of 1798, and on the defeat of the patriots or rebels the family was ruined. Thomas Devereux was arrested and imprisoned and pardoned just before his death. The Devereux had six sons and three daughters. A price was set upon the heads of three of his sons and his estates were confiscated. His children were:

- Walter, the eldest son, was a man of powerful frame, distinguished for his strength and courage, and was in several battles in the Rebellion of 1798.
- John Corish was born at his father's farm, near Enniscorthy, County Wexford, Ireland, 5 August 1774.
- Thomas married Mary Redmond and they had one son, John C., Jr., who was afterwards adopted by his brother, John C. Devereux, of Utica.
- James was killed at the Battle of Vinegar Hill.
- Luke came to America and died of yellow fever at Natchez, Mississippi in 1818.
- Nicholas was the sixth son.
- Catherine Devereux became the Superior of the Presentation convent in Enniscorthy.

== Life ==
During the agitation preceding the rebellion, John C. Devereux was obliged to fly from the country; he went first to France and afterwards to America. He landed at New York about 1797, gave dancing lessons in Connecticut, and in November 1802 opened a dry goods and grocery store in Utica, New York. Devereux was a friend of Albany shopkeeper and entrepreneur William James. His goods were of handsome quality. Devereux "...had energy, shrewdness, and industry; a temper most generous, a tongue that was persuasive and fluent, and manners benignant and polished." He quickly became possibly the most successful and best known merchant west of Albany. His brothers Luke, Thomas, and Nicholas emigrated as well, and joined him. By 1813, Luke Devereux had opened his own store.

He was successful and became wealthy; was public spirited and enterprising. Dr. Bagg in "The Pioneers of Utica" says, "a settler of 1802 and a very prince among his fellows was John C. Devereux whose honourable career and many deeds of charity left behind him a memory as verdant as that of the green isle whence he came". In 1814, his brother Nicholas, after two years working for William James in Albany, returned to Utica and partnered with John. The business prospered and became one of the most extensive in Western New York. In 1830 Mr. Devereux was appointed president of the Utica branch of the United States Bank and held the position as long as the bank existed.

=== The Savings Bank of Utica ===
As the Devereux brothers were successful business, many people with relatively small savings would seek their advice regarding possible investments. By 1821 a custom had developed whereby they would leave money with the brothers for safekeeping. "The scant savings of poorer citizens who confided in the integrity of these gentlemen were sacredly guarded and regular interest was paid on all accumulated balances." Even after both had retired from active business, they retained a bookkeeper at the Devereux office at 12 Bleecker Street, to keep track of accounts. In 1839, Nicholas decided it was time to form a corporation to carry on this work. They founded the Utica Savings Bank, for which they obtained a charter. John was elected president. At first the bank was operated from Nicholas Devereux's office, a vacant shop where the corporation secretary, Stalham Williams would receive deposits. On the wall was a gauge for measuring height for the purposes of identification, and a detailed physical description of each depositor was maintained in a memorandum book. In 1868, the bank moved to new quarters on the corner of Genesee and Fayette streets. The meticulous Mr. Williams, who had served as a collector on the Erie Canal, continued to serve as secretary well into his nineties.

Prior to 1840, the mayor was appointed by the city council. That year, John C. Devereux became the first elected mayor of the city of Utica.

He was twice married. His first wife, Miss Ellen Barry, of Albany, died in 1813. His second wife Mary, daughter of Peter Colt, of Rome, New York, survived him twenty-one years and died August 7, 1868. They had no children, but at different times adopted two: Ellen, who became the wife of Mr. Catlin, of Paterson, New Jersey, and his nephew, John C. Devereux, Jr., son of his brother Thomas. John C. Devereux, Jr. died in 1861.

John Corish Devereux died at Utica, New York, on 11 December 1848, and was buried on the grounds of the Sisters of Charity, near St. John's church.

== Philanthropy ==
A devout Catholic, he donated $300 to the building of the Presbyterian Church. Devereux loved his Church and its institutions, and in 1813 was a trustee of St. Mary's, Albany. Visiting missionary priests always stayed at Devereux's home, where local Catholics heard Mass on Sundays. In 1819, he and his brother Nicholas became two of the founding trustees of St. John's Church, whose congregation at that time numbered about twenty-five. However, this number was further increased by the arrival of a large number of Irish immigrants working on the Erie Canal, and who contributed from their earnings one dollar a month toward the purchase of land and erection of a building. By 1828, there were 600 parishioners.

In 1843 he and Nicholas brought the Daughters of Charity of Emmitsburg, Maryland to Utica to open St. John's Female Orphan Asylum; the two Devereux brothers each gave $5,000 towards the project, and donated both the land and buildings. The sisters subsequently opened a day school.
