= Devereaux House =

Devereaux House may refer to:

in Canada

- Devereaux House, Ontario, a historic farmhouse

in the United States

- Nathan B. Devereaux Octagon House, Northfield, Michigan, listed on the National Register of Historic Places (NRHP)
- Devereaux House (Salt Lake City, Utah), NRHP-listed
