= John Devereux (academic) =

Australian lawyer and legal academic

John Anthony Devereux is a professor of law at the University of Queensland.

Devereux's primary area of research and teaching is in the area of Torts. He has a special interest in Medical Law. He has been awarded over $2.5 million in research funding.https://law.uq.edu.au/profile/1056/john-devereux

== Education ==
Devereux was mainly educated at St Joseph's College Gregory Terrace, though he spent one year at Primrose Hill Primary School in England. His classmates at Primrose Hill included Sam Mendes and Sadie Frost. Devereux went on to study a Bachelor of Arts (1984) and Bachelor of Laws (1987) at the University of Queensland. Devereux was awarded a Rhodes Scholarship in 1988. He completed his Doctorate of Philosophy at Oxford University in 1993 in Competency to Consent to Medical Treatment in England and Australia as a student of Magdalen College. In 2025 Devereux was awarded a Masters in Liberal Arts in the field of International Relations by Harvard University. https://about.uq.edu.au/experts/202

== Professional career ==
Devereux has worked as a lawyer in a variety of contexts including as a Barrister, as a consultant to a multi-national law firm, a Law Reform Commissioner for Queensland and as a Defence Force Magistrate. Devereux was admitted to the Queensland Bar in 1988 and the Tasmanian Bar in 1997. He was a Lecturer in Law at Keble College, Oxford University and Assistant Dean of Magdalen College, Oxford University. He was made professor of law at the University of Queensland in 1999. In 2010 he took leave from the University of Queensland to become Associate Vice Chancellor of Australian Catholic University. Devereux is an Honorary Fellow of the Australasian College of Legal Medicine. Devereux currently serves as a member of the Administrative Review Tribunal. He was a member of the Administrative Appeals Tribunal. He was formerly the legal member of the Health Quality and Complaints Commission, and was formerly a Law Reform Commissioner for Queensland.

== Military career ==
Devereux was a member of the Australian Army Infantry Corps. He joined the Royal Australian Air Force in 2001 as a Specialist Legal Officer. He now holds the rank of Group Captain. He deployed to Iraq in 2007-2008 and Afghanistan in 2011-2012 and again 2017-2018. He was awarded a Bronze Star by the United States of America for his service in Iraq. He has served four terms as a Defence Force Magistrate and Judge Advocate.

== Key publications ==
=== Journal articles ===
- S Kiel-Chisholm, J Devereux, 'The Ghost in the Machine: Legal Challenges of Neural Interface Devices' (2015) 23 (1) The Tort Law Review 32-44
- J Devereux, 'Known Knowns and Known Unknowns: The Mysteries of Intentional Torts Against the Person' (2014) 22 Tort Law Review 134-144
- J Devereux, N Morrison, 'Child Saviours : Reconceiving the Legal Dimension' (2014) 22 (1) Tort Law Review 9-21
- J Devereux, R Beran, 'Reconciling Medical and Legal Conceptions of Surgery - An Exercise in Futility?' (2014) 22 (2) Tort Law Review 68-74
- J Devereux, N Morrison, 'Child Saviours: Reconceiving the Ethical Dimension' (2014) 22 (1) Tort Law Review 3-9
- J Devereux, 'Public Forum', Your Health Future: Genes & Me, Translational Research Institute (TRI) (2014)

=== Books ===
- J Devereux and others, Torts: A Practical Learning Approach (3rd edn LexisNexis Butterworths, Sydney 2014)
- J Devereux, A Clarke, J Werren, Torts: A Practical Learning Approach (2nd edn LexisNexis Butterworths, Sydney 2011)
- A Clarke, J Devereux, Torts: A Practical Learning Approach (Butterworths, Sydney 2008)
- J Devereux, Australian Medical Law (3rd edn Routledge-Cavendish, Abingdon, Oxon 2007) J Devereux, Australian Medical Law (Cavendish Press, London 2002)
- J Devereux, Medical Law (Cavendish Press, London 1997)
