= Gaston Bonnier =

French botanist (1853–1922)

Gaston Eugène Marie Bonnier
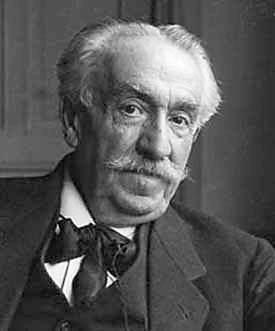
- Gaston Bonnier
- Born: 9 April 1853; Paris, France
- Died: 2 January 1922 (aged 68)
- Education: École Normale Supérieure, Uppsala University
- Known for: Experimental plant ecology, founding the Revue Générale de Botanique, floras of France
- Scientific career
- Fields: Botany, Plant Ecology
- Thesis: Les Nectaires, étude critique, anatomique et physiologique (1879)
- Doctoral students: Henri Devaux; Maurice Bouly de Lesdain; Paul Becquerel; Louis Emberger; Paul Jaccard; Albert Maige

Gaston Eugène Marie Bonnier (French pronunciation: [ɡastɔ̃ øʒɛn maʁi bɔnje]; 9 April 1853 – 2 January 1922) was a French botanist and plant ecologist. The standard author abbreviation Bonnier is used to indicate this person as the author when citing a botanical name.

== Biography ==
Bonnier first studied at École Normale Supérieure in Paris from 1873 to 1876. Together with Charles Flahault, he studied at Uppsala University in 1878. They published two articles about their impressions:

- Observations sur la flore cryptogamique de la Scandinavie
- Sur la distribution des végétaux dans la region moyenne de la presqu’ile Scandinave (both with Charles Flahault 1879)

He became assistant professor, later full professor, of botany at Sorbonne in 1887 and, in addition, he founded a Plant Biological Laboratory in Fontainebleau in 1889. The same year, he co-founded the scientific journal Revue Générale de Botanique, which he edited until 1922. He was an early exponent of experimental plant ecology. He transplanted alpine plants between the Alps and Pyrenees and the research garden in Fontainebleau. The results were published in:

- Cultures expérimentales dans les Alpes et les Pyrénées. Revue Générale de Botanique 2 (1890): 513–546.
- Les plantes arctiques comparées aux mêmes espèces des Alpes et des Pyrénées (1894).
- Nouvelles observations sur les cultures expérimentales à diverses altitudes et cultures par semis. Revue Générale de Botanique 22 (1920): 305–326.

He authored several floras of France, such as

- Nouvelle flore du Nord de la France et de la Belgique pour la détermination facile des plantes sans mots techniques. Vol. I. Tableaux synoptiques des plantes vasculaires de la flore de la France. P. Dupont, Paris, 1894 (With Georges de Layens (1834–1897)).
  - Vol. II. Nouvelle Flore des mousses et des hépatiques with Charles Isidore Douin (1858–1944). P. Dupont, Paris, 1895.
  - Vol. III. Nouvelle Flore des champignons with Julien Noël Costantin (1857–1936) and Léon Jean Marie Dufour (1862–1942). P. Dupont, Paris, 1895.
- Flore complète illustrée de France, Suisse et Belgique. (1911).

Notable students of Gaston Bonnier include Henri Devaux, Maurice Bouly de Lesdain, Paul Becquerel, Louis Emberger, Paul Jaccard, and Albert Maige among others.
