= Adrian Van Sinderen =

American businessman (1887–1963)

- Born: February 21, 1887
- Died: October 1, 1963 (aged 76); Middlebury, Connecticut
- Occupation: Businessman

Adrian Van Sinderen (1887–1963) was an American businessman and civic leader.

== Early life ==
Adrian Van Sinderen was born February 21, 1887. He had one brother, Henry B. After graduating from Yale College in 1910, he briefly taught in St. Paul's School in New Hampshire before turning to business.

== Career ==
Van Sinderen started work at J. P. Morgan. Within four years, he was a partner in the brokerage W. A. and A. M. White, where he remained for the rest of his life. He sat on the board of directors for the New York Telephone Company and Manufacturers Trust Company.

During World War I, he served with the New York Port of Embarkation and received the Navy Cross for distinguished service. Van Sinderen was discharged as a Major.

His philanthropic pursuits included service as president of the Brooklyn Hospital (1930–1946); vice president of the Long Island College of Medicine, Brooklyn Bureau of Charities, Greater New York Fund, and United Hospital Fund; and officer of the Brooklyn Academy of Music, American Red Cross Brooklyn Chapter, and Brooklyn Institute of Arts and Sciences.

His varied interests included breeding hackney ponies and book collecting. In his lifetime, he received over 2,500 horse show ribbons and was a longtime president of the American Horse Shows Association. Van Sinderen wrote over 30 books, mostly on Christmas but also on travel. He had been to six continents, all fifty United States, and every American national park. Van Sinderen established Yale undergraduate prizes rewarding the most interesting book collections. He additionally played the organ and was a member of multiple private social clubs.

Van Sinderen received an honorary doctorate from Syracuse University in 1948.

== Personal life ==
Van Sinderen died October 1, 1963, in a Middlebury, Connecticut, nursing home at the age of 76. He lived in Brooklyn and Washington, Connecticut. He and Annie Jean White, the daughter of philanthropist Alfred Tredway White, were married on December 9, 1911. Van Sinderen's Yale classmate Robert A. Taft, the sitting president's son, was in the wedding party. In 1921, the death of Annie Jean's father left his $15 million estate to her (equivalent to $264 million in 2024). She died in 1968, five years after her husband. They had four children, including the telephone executive Alfred White.
