= Richard Devereux =

Richard Devereux may refer to:

- Richard Devereux (cricketer), English cricketer
- Richard Devereux (died 1547), political figure during the reign of Henry VIII and Edward VI
- Richard Joseph Devereux (1829–1883), Irish politician

== See also ==
- Richard Devereaux, politician and official in Newfoundland
- Richard T. Devereaux, US Air Force general
