= Marianne Devaux =

New Caledonian politician

Marianne Devaux (born October 27, 1962, in Nouméa) is a New Caledonian politician. She has served in the Congress of New Caledonia as a member of The Rally-UMP.
