= David Deveau =

American musician (born 1953)

David Deveau (born 1953) is an American classical pianist. Born in Concord, Massachusetts, he has appeared as soloist with the Boston Symphony and Boston Pops Orchestras, the San Francisco, Pittsburgh, St. Louis, Minnesota, Houston, Miami, Pacific and Portland Symphony Orchestras.
