= Henri Devaux =

French botanist (1862–1956)

Henri Edgard Devaux
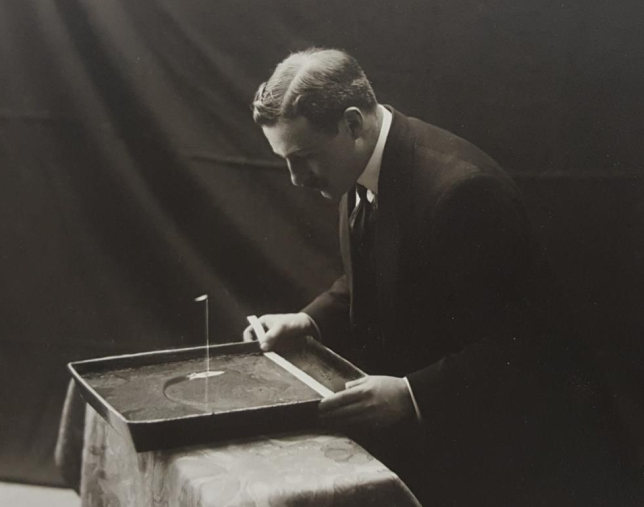
- Devaux demonstrating a thin oil film on water, with toy boat, in 1912
- Born: July 6, 1862; Étaules, Charente-Maritime, France
- Died: March 14, 1956 (aged 93); Bordeaux, France
- Known for: Membrane studies Perspectives on science and religion
- Awards: Laura R. Leonard Prize
- Scientific career
- Fields: Botany; Plant physiology Surface science
- Thesis: Du mécanisme des échanges chez les plantes aquatiques (1889)

Henri Edgard Devaux (6 July 1862 – 14 March 1956) was a French botanist, biophysicist, and plant physiologist who worked on gas exchange and membranes. In his studies on thin films, he was one of the pioneers of surface chemistry and molecular biophysics.

Devaux was born in Etaules and went to study pharmacy at the University of Bordeaux with a scholarship. He then went to the University of Sorbonne and received a doctorate in 1889 for work under Gaston Bonnier on gas exchange in plant tissues. In 1896 he noted the absorption of metal ions in the cell membranes of aquatic plants and examined ion exchange through the effects of sodium of potassium ion concentrations in the surroundings. He became the first chair of plant physiology at the University of Bordeaux in 1906 after spending time in the University of Dijon. From 1903 he began to take an interest in the physics of surfaces. He was a popular demonstrator and experimenter, and his demonstrations on oil monolayer films on water with talc, camphor and toy boats were popular. He also made use of mercury and with this approach, using a known amount of liquid, he was able to compute the surface area of circular mono-layers of various fats, oils and proteins and estimate molecular weights.

Devaux was brought up in a religious Protestant upbringing in a family that included many generations who worked as sailors and farmers. He was disturbed by the death of his father in 1886 and began to examine the role of religion and his own science. From 1890 he became more religious and often wrote on his spiritual views in his laboratory notes and even some of his scientific works. He rejected Claude Bernard's idea for the separation of religion and science. He also rejected ideas of evolution and believed in Biblical Creation.

In 1931, Devaux shared the Laura Leonard Prize with Agnes Pockels for their respective investigations of the properties of surface layers and surface films.
