= Nicholas Devereux =

Irish-American financier and banker (1791–1855)

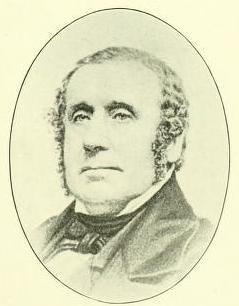
Nicholas Devereux

Nicholas Devereux (June 7, 1791 – December 29, 1855) was an Irish-American financier and banker, and one of the major early landowners in western New York state. "Nicholas Devereux was very charitable and hospitable — a cultured, pious, progressive Irish-American. He was proud of his nationality and of his faith, and this pride was expressed in action whenever and wherever the opportunity arose." Devereux founded St. Bonaventure University.

== Background ==
Nicholas Devereux was born June 7, 1791, the son of Thomas and Catherine (Corish) Devereux, of County Wexford, Ireland. They had six sons and three daughters. Originally of Norman French extraction, they were wealthy and well connected, and lived at ease on their handsome estate, "The Leap", at Davidstown, near Enniscorthy. They sympathized warmly with and took an aggressive part in the agitations preceding the Irish Rebellion of 1798, and on the defeat of the patriots or rebels the family was ruined. Thomas Devereux was arrested and imprisoned and pardoned just before his death. A price was set upon the heads of three of his sons and his estates were confiscated. The eldest son, Walter, was a man of powerful frame, distinguished for his strength and courage. The second son was John Corish Devereux, who during the agitation preceding the rebellion was obliged to fly from the country; he went first to France and afterwards to America. Thomas married Mary Redmond and they had one son, John C. Jr., who was afterwards adopted by Thomas's brother, John C. Devereux, of Utica. The fourth son, James, was killed at the Battle of Vinegar Hill. The fifth son, Luke, came to America and died of yellow fever at Natchez, Mississippi in 1818. Nicholas was the sixth son. One of his sisters became the Superior of the Presentation convent in Enniscorthy.

John Corish Devereux, Nicholas's older brother, came to America in 1796 or 1797 and settled in Utica, New York in 1802. There he opened a dry goods and grocery store; the business prospered and became one of the most extensive in Western New York. A courtly and polished gentleman, John C. Devereux was most noted for his charity and hospitality. He was a devout Catholic, but contributed generously to many charities and denominations. He was the first mayor of Utica elected by the people, in 1840. Twice married, he had no children, and adopted his nephew, John C. Devereux Jr., son of his brother Thomas.

== Life ==
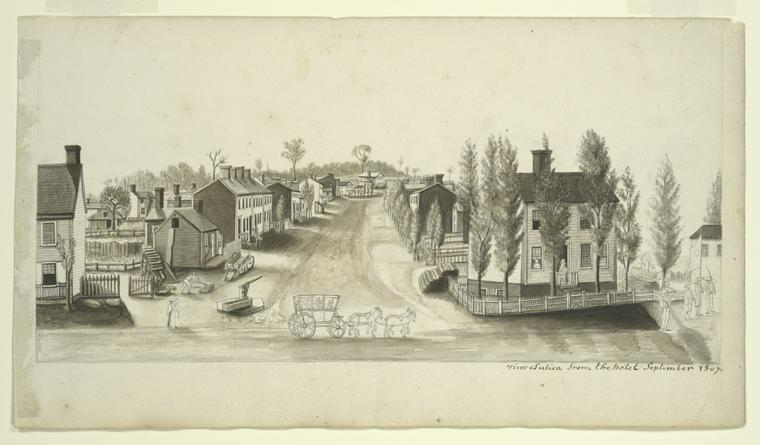
View of Utica from the hotel September 1807

In 1806, at the age of fifteen, Nicholas Devereux emigrated to join his brother John, who had previously settled in Utica, New York. On the first Sunday following his arrival he attended Mass in St. Peter's, Barclay Street, and put on the plate one of his last three gold coins, The sexton thought it as an offering of thanks for his safe trip to America.

He was employed as a clerk for his brother until going to work for William James and Company in Albany, New York. James had emigrated from Bailieborough, County Cavan, Ireland around 1789, and amassed a vast fortune from business dealings in upstate New York, primarily in Albany real estate, money lending, and his involvement with the building of the Erie Canal. William James also owned a salt company, a tobacco factory and a Hudson River shipping operation. In 1814, Devereux returned to Utica and went into partnership with his brother in a firm that after his brother retired in 1816, became "Devereux & Co". The firm was one of the largest in Western New York.

In 1821 Nicholas and his brother, John purchased the land above the canal between Genesee and Hotel streets, where they erected a large store and warehouse. Devereux was very successful as a merchant. In the fall of 1827 the firm was called on to pay $90,000 within ninety days. At that time he was living in a handsome place which he purchased from Jeremiah Van Rensselaer. Devereux divided the beautiful grounds into lots, intersecting them by streets, and sold them at a handsome profit. In 1835, he bought from the Holland Land Company over 400,000 acres in Western New York of what remained of the Holland Purchase, including much of the territory of Cattaraugus, Allegany, and Wyoming counties.

He was mainly instrumental in procuring the establishment at Utica of the first branch of the United States Bank that was located west of Albany. His brother was appointed president of the Utica branch of the United States Bank and held the position as long as the bank existed.

As the Devereux brothers were successful business, many people with relatively small savings would seek their advice regarding possible investments. By 1821 a custom had developed whereby they would leave money with the brothers for safekeeping. Even after both had retired from active business, they retained a bookkeeper at the Devereux office at 12 Bleecker Street, to keep track of accounts. In 1839, Nicholas decided it was time to form a corporation to carry on this work. They founded the Utica Savings Bank (now part of Park National Bank), one of the first savings banks in America, for which they obtained a charter. John was elected president. At first the bank was operated from Nicholas Devereux's office, a vacant shop where the corporation secretary, Stalham Williams would receive deposits. Passbooks were kept on shelves behind the shop counter. On the wall was a gauge for measuring height for the purposes of identification, and a detailed physical description of each depositor was maintained in a memorandum book. In 1868, the bank moved to new quarters on the corner of Genesee and Fayette streets.

Largely through his efforts the State Hospital was located in Utica and he was a member of the first board of managers. He was a director in the Utica Steam Woolen Mills and of the New York Life Insurance and Trust Company(merged with the Bank of New York in 1922). In the interest of the New York Life Insurance and Trust Company he spent some time in Albany and while there took an active part in the organization of the Utica and Schenectady Railroad, of which he became a director. He owned at various times large quantities of real estate in Utica and Western New York and in the vicinity of Scranton, Pennsylvania. He held at one time title to over 50,000 acres of land in that State.

As a financier and director, he was involved in the Utica Water Works, and also the Steam Woolen Mills of Utica. The mill, which employed about 100 people, manufactured broadcloth.

According to Francis Kernan, "Nicholas Devereux was very charitable and hospitable — a cultured, pious, progressive Irish-American. He was proud of his nationality and of his faith, and this pride was expressed in action whenever and wherever the opportunity arose." Nicholas Devereux died at Utica, New York, 29 Dec., 1855.

== Family ==
Devereux became acquainted with the family of Dr.Benjamin Butler (a surgeon) on his business trips to New York. He married their daughter Mary Dolbear Butler on November 28, 1817. They had six children. His daughter Hannah married United States Senator Francis Kernan; his daughter Mary became a Sister of Mercy and laboured for thirty years in the convents in Houston and 81st streets, New York. His son, John C. Devereux, assisted in managing his father's extensive properties. In 1831, his family was subject to a dangerous case of influenza. While it appears that the members of the Devereux household survived, the attending physician, Dr. Alexander Coventry succumbed to the illness, leaving behind seven sons and four daughters.

== Philanthropy ==
Devereux was an ardent Catholic, and a generous philanthropist. Nicholas Devereux was a lover of the Holy Scripture and read the entire Bible through seventeen times. To circulate the New Testament he had an edition of it printed at Utica at his own expense. The plates of this edition were afterwards purchased by Messrs. Sadlier, of New York, and about 40,000 copies printed. Devereux taught Sunday-school in St. John's Church, Utica, and gave a copy of the New Testament to any boy or girl who memorized the Gospel of St. John.

In 1843, the Devereux brothers were among the founding trustees of St. John's Orphan Asylum, staffed by the Daughters of Charity from Emmitsburg, Maryland. In 1854 he founded Assumption Academy and saw it staffed by the Christian Brothers, who later ran St. Vincent's orphanage. It became St. Vincent's Industrial School.

A noted instance of his spontaneous generosity refers back to the early days of the Church in Connecticut. Happening to be at Hartford one Sunday in 1829, he learned that owing to the bigotry and Know Nothing sentiment in the town, it was impossible for the parishioners to obtain a certain piece of property for their church, as they were too few and too poor to provide the ready cash demanded. Devereux, though a stranger, did not need to be appealed to, he immediately advanced the required sum of $10,000, without asking or receiving any assurance that the money would ever be returned to him, though the grateful pioneer Catholics did in fact repay him later.

He founded St. Bonaventure University in Allegany, New York on 200 acres of land that he had himself donated. With John Timon, the Bishop of Buffalo, he was instrumental in inviting a group of Franciscan brothers from Italy, to minister to the growing Catholic population of Western New York and to teach at the new university. He visited Rome in 1854 accompanied by his wife, his daughter Mary, and Michael Clarke, and returned with six Franciscan Fathers and gave them $5,000 towards building the friary. The largest residence hall on the St. Bonaventure University campus is named Devereux Hall in his honor.

On his return from Italy he wrote a letter to the New York "Freeman's Journal" offering to be one of one hundred persons who would each give $1,000 towards founding a seminary at Rome, for the education of American priests. He had, moreover, several conversations with Cardinal Wiseman who promised to use his influence with Pope Pius IX to carry out the project. After his death his widow carried out his wishes and thus was begun the foundation of the American College, Rome.

== Books ==
- Lewis, Clifford; Kernan, John Devereux (1974). Devereux of the Leap, County Wexford, Ireland and of Utica, New York: Nicholas Devereux, 1791-1855. Lewis.
