= Helena Devereux =

American educator (1885–1975)

Helena Trafford Devereux (February 2, 1885 – November 17, 1975) was an American educator who founded the Devereux Foundation. She is considered a pioneer in the field of special education.

In 1912, Devereux began the first Devereux School for Exceptional Children in her home with less than $100. Today, more than 6,000 Devereux staff provides services to tens of thousands of children, adolescents, adults, and their families in 11 states and millions more across the country through public education and prevention programs each year.

== Education ==
Devereux graduated from the Philadelphia High School for Girls in 1904 and from the Philadelphia Normal School for Girls in 1906 where she trained to become a teacher. Upon graduation she began teaching in one of Philadelphia's most underprivileged communities, at the George Washington School in South Philadelphia.

At a time when very little was known or understood about people with disabilities, Devereux took an interest in “slow learning” children. She recognized early that the public school system was ill-equipped to teach children with mental handicaps. Her intuitive ideas in developing individualized educational programs for children with special needs were far beyond her time. While the system had typically referred to slow learners as “throw-aways” Devereux believed that every child should be given opportunities to learn and achieve personal accomplishments. She believed that special educators are missionaries at heart. Soon, her class became the de facto special education classroom.

In 1911, Devereux was offered the job of Director of Special Education by the Philadelphia Board of Education, a new position designed to supervise the creation of a special education department. Despite being offered a handsome salary for the time, she turned it down, believing that she could have a greater impact branching off on her own.

Also in 1911, Devereux received national attention following a visit to her classroom from a reporter. Shortly thereafter, “The First Class of Special Education in an Elementary School in Philadelphia” was published. Following the publication about her teaching methods, Devereux was contacted by a parent in South Carolina, interested in entrusting her challenged son to Devereux's care. For $200, Devereux agreed to assume responsibility for the boy during the summer. The child, Robert Simpson, would become Devereux's first private school student. During that time, Devereux also received similar offers from other parents of children with special needs. In the summer of 1911, Devereux rented at six-bedroom home in Avalon, New Jersey in order to teach and care for eight children.

== Devereux Schools: The beginning ==
In 1912 several children continued to live with Devereux in her own home in Philadelphia, which became her first private school. This marked the beginning of The Devereux Foundation. During that time, Devereux remained a public school teacher, and employed two assistant teachers to teach and look after students during the day.

Devereux devoted herself to learning how to best serve her students. Between the years of 1910 and 1918, Devereux participated in several post graduate endeavors, including the study of psychiatry, psychoanalysis and speech therapy at colleges and universities in the Philadelphia area. She also took apprenticeship training in the areas of occupational therapy, woodworking and handicrafts. All her efforts focused on improving the education and experience of the students in her charge. In 1914 she began working for the Philadelphia Normal School in order to teach post graduate students in the country's first course on special education.

In 1918, she resigned from the Normal school to teach her private school students full-time. In January 1918 she used $94 of saved and borrowed funds in order to rent a house in Devon, Pennsylvania.

== Organizational growth ==
On May 1, 1918, Helena Devereux and her students took residence in the house that became known as “Devereux Stone.” Soon her students numbered 12, and in 1919 Devereux was able to purchase the rental property, as well as the neighboring estate. Over the course of two years, school enrollment doubled. In 1920 Devereux purchased another property in Berwyn, Pennsylvania in order to provide a home to some of the younger developmentally disabled children in her care. From 1920 onward, the organization saw continued growth, both in enrollment numbers, as well as in properties purchased.

In 1922, the different schools and facilities became united under one name—Devereux Schools. Despite an operating deficit of $250,000 during the Great Depression, Devereux continued to acquire real estate throughout the Philadelphia area. Creditors were kept at bay through the shared burden of Devereux staff, and loans from the parents of Devereux's students.

In 1938 The Commonwealth of Pennsylvania granted The Devereux Foundation its non-profit charter.

In 1940 Devereux transferred all the assets and properties of Devereux Schools to the Foundation. In 1943 The Devereux Foundation expanded tremendously, purchasing another building in Devon as well as a 350-acre estate in Santa Barbara, California. She would continue to serve actively as a consultant.

The Foundation continued to expand in the 1950s and 1960s, opening branches in Texas, Massachusetts, Connecticut, and Arizona. In 1955 Devereux began professional training and research partnerships with several universities including the Teachers College of Columbia University, Pennsylvania State University, University of Pennsylvania, and Bryn Mawr College School of Social Work, among others. 1957 saw the introduction of the Devereux Institute for Research and Training, an initiative to expand professional training and research into the causes and treatment of certain psychological problems in children.

In 1957, Devereux resigned as director of the Foundation.

== Professional acknowledgments ==
In 1958 Devereux became the first non-medical person, and only the fourth woman to become an honorary member of the American Psychiatric Association. Devereux's only published paper was published in 1909 in The Psychological Clinic entitled, “Report of a Year’s Work on Defectives in a Public School.”

== Personal life ==
In 1924, Devereux married James Fentress, a widower of one of her friends. She continued to be called Miss Devereux. Married 21 years, they maintained very private personal lives, despite collaborating in the affairs of the organization. A strong supporter of his wife's independence and presence as the President of Devereux, Fentress served as the organization's Vice President, overseeing finances as the organization grew in size and scope.

Fentress died in 1943 and Devereux never remarried. Her family life in Pennsylvania centered on her brother, Robert's, children Mary Helena Devereux Scott and Richard Blyton Devereux, M.D.

Devereux died November 17, 1975, at her home in Devon at age 90.
