= Devereux Foundation =

American nonprofit health organization

The Devereux Foundation is a nonprofit behavioral health organization that operates programs and services in 13 U.S. states, working with children and adults with developmental disabilities, emotional and behavioral disorders, and mental illnesses. It is one of the oldest and largest nonprofit providers of behavioral healthcare in the United States. Its operations include psychiatric hospitals, residential treatment centers, group homes, respite care, supported living, foster care, special education, and vocational education.

It has EIN 23-1390618 as a 501(c)(3) Public Charity; in 2024, it reported total revenue of $494,170,417 and total assets of $263,391,000.

== History ==
Helena T. Devereux founded the first Devereux School in Philadelphia in 1912, after having taught special education in the School District of Philadelphia. By 1918, Devereux moved her operation to Devon, Pennsylvania and began acquiring properties throughout Chester County, Pennsylvania and along the Philadelphia Main Line to accommodate her rapidly expanding programs. The Devereux Foundation was established as a nonprofit organization in 1938.

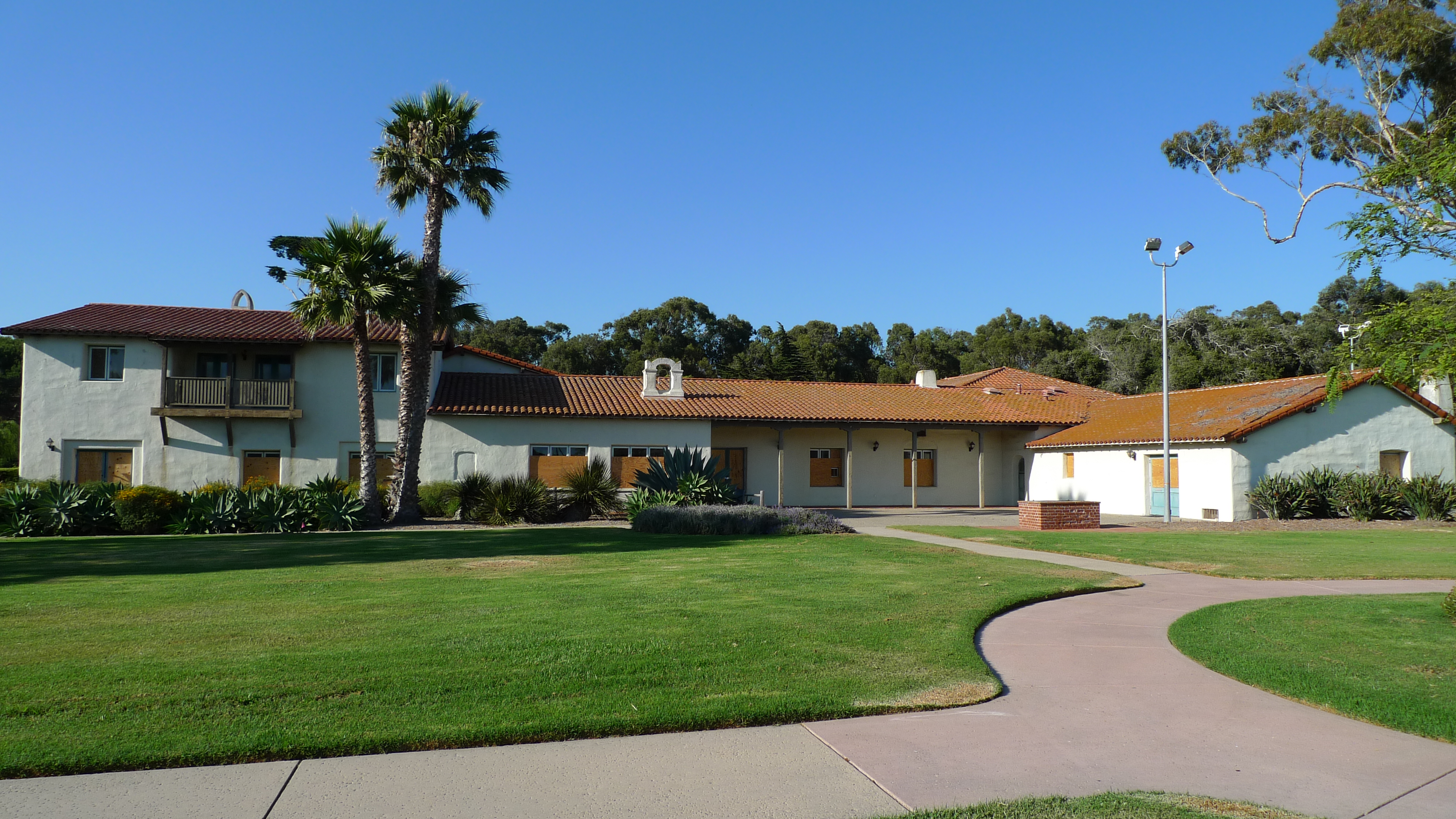
California center's Devereux Hall in Santa Barbara County in 2010

The organization's first major expansion, to California, was aided by support from the Max Factor Family Foundation. In 1945, the Devereux Foundation opened a school and residential treatment center on the Campbell Ranch in Santa Barbara County. Devereux Hall was designated a Historical Landmark by the County of Santa Barbara on September 8, 1987.
