= James DeVeaux =

American painter

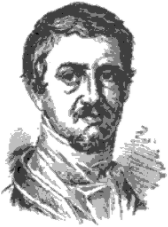
- Born: September 12, 1812; Charleston, South Carolina, United States
- Died: April 28, 1844 (aged 31); Rome, Italy
- Occupation: Artist

James DeVeaux (also spelled De Veaux; 1812–1844) was an American painter.

== Biography ==
James DeVeaux was born in Charleston, South Carolina on September 12, 1812.

He died in Rome on April 28, 1844.
