= Georges de Layens =

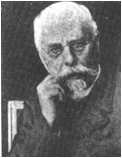
- Born: 6 January 1834; Lille, Nord
- Died: 23 October 1897 (aged 63); Nice, Provence-Alpes-Côte d'Azur
- Occupations: botanist apiculturalist
- Known for: Creator of the Layens hive
- Scientific career
- Author abbrev. (botany): Layens

Georges de Layens (January 6, 1834 in Lille - October 23, 1897 in Nice) was a French botanist and apiculturalist. He was the creator of a popular mobile beehive called the "Layens hive". The standard author abbreviation Layens is used to indicate this person as the author when citing a botanical name.

Layens was a member of the Académie des sciences. From 1869 to 1874, he lived in the Dauphiné Alps, where he established an apiary. Around 1877 he founded an apiary in Louye, Eure.

== Published works ==
He wrote or co-wrote a number of works on beekeeping and botany. With Gaston Bonnier (1853–1922), he was co-author of a book on apiculture called "Cours complet d'apiculture" and a publication on plants of northern France and Belgium titled "Nouvelle flore du Nord de la France et de la Belgique". Other publications associated with Layens include:

- Elevage des abeilles: par les procédés modernes pratique et théorie, 1882 - Beekeeping: modern procedures, practice and theory.
- Les abeilles: pratique de leur culture: miel, cire, hydromel, 1885 - Bees: their culture: honey, wax, mead.
- Le rucher illustre, erreurs à éviter et conseils à suivre, 1900 - Apiary through illustrations, mistakes to avoid and tips to follow.
- "Notice sur Georges de Layens (1834-1897)" by Gaston Bonnier.
