= Alfred Van Sinderen =

American telephone executive

- Born: June 20, 1924; Brooklyn, New York
- Died: October 24, 1998 (aged 74); Woodbridge, Connecticut
- Occupation: Telephone executive

Alfred White Van Sinderen (1924–1998) was an executive at Southern New England Telephone (SNET).

== Early life ==
Alfred White Van Sinderen was born on June 20, 1924, in Brooklyn, New York, to a prominent Connecticut family. His father was Adrian Van Sinderen, a businessman. The family attended The Gunnery, a Connecticut boarding school, which Alfred's children were the third generation to attend. He had two sisters: Katharine and Jean.

He graduated Phi Beta Kappa from Yale College in 1945 and was award the Warren Memorial High Scholarship prize for the highest rank in scholarship. He received a master's degree from Harvard Business School. During World War II, he was a naval officer in the Pacific.

== Career ==
Van Sinderen worked at Southern New England Telephone for 38 years. He became its president and most senior executive in 1967, where he remained for 17 years, until 1984. He stepped down as chairman the next year but remained a board director.

While at Southern New England Telephone, he served as a director of the United Aircraft Corporation.

After Southern New England Telephone, he began teaching at Yale School of Management and engaged in civic projects in 1984. He was president of the Foundation for the New Haven Green from 1986 to 1991. Van Sinderen was named William H. Donaldson Distinguished Faculty Fellow in 1985.

== Personal life ==
Following a cerebral hemorrhage around 1996, Van Sinderen lived in the Harborside Healthcare-Willows nursing home in Woodbridge, Connecticut until his death on October 12, 1998, at the age of 74.

Van Sinderen was married (Suzanne) and had been previously divorced. He had six children: Alexander, David, Sylvia, Jean, Katherine, Alex. Their son, David, died in the 1997 Heaven's Gate mass suicide.
