= Devereux, Georgia =

Unincorporated community in Georgia, U.S.

Coordinates: 33°13′20″N 83°04′25″W

Devereux is an unincorporated community in Hancock County, in the U.S. state of Georgia.

== History ==
A variant spelling was "Devereaux". A post office called Devereaux Station was established in 1870, the name was changed to Devereux in 1896, and the post office closed in 1959. The community was named after Samuel Devereaux, the original owner of the site.
