= Julien Noël Costantin =

French botanist and mycologist (1857–1936)

Julien Noël Costantin (16 August 1857 – 17 November 1936) was a French botanist and mycologist who was a native of Paris.

He studied at École Normale Supérieure on the Rue d'Ulm. In 1881 he received his license in natural history and two years later earned his doctorate. In 1883 he was appointed adjunct professor at Bordeaux, and through influence from Philippe Van Tieghem (1839-1914), became an assistant naturalist at the Muséum national d'histoire naturelle shortly afterwards.

In 1887 Costantin became a lecturer of botany at Ecole Normale Superieure. In 1901 he succeeded Marie Maxime Cornu (1843-1901) as chair of horticulture at the museum of natural history. Along with these duties, he taught classes at the École nationale d’horticulture in Versailles and at the École supérieure coloniale in Nogent-sur-Marne. In 1912 he became a member of the French Academy of Sciences.

Costantin defended Lamarckian evolution until his death in 1936.

== Publications ==
- Atlas en couleurs des orchidées cultivées (E. Orlhac, Paris) – Color atlas of cultivated orchids.
- Les Mucédinées simples. Histoire, classification, culture et rôle des champignons inférieurs dans les maladies des végétaux et des animaux (P. Klincksieck, Paris, 1888).
- Nouvelle flore des champignons, pour la détermination facile de toutes les espèces de France et de la plupart des espèces européennes (P. Dupont, Paris, 1891, re-edited in 1895, 1904, 1967 et 1997) — In the series of "Nouvelle Flore" by Gaston Bonnier (1851-1922) and Georges de Layens (1834-1897).
- Atlas des champignons comestibles et vénéneux (P. Dupont, Paris, 1895) – Atlas of edible and poisonous mushrooms.
- Petite flore des champignons comestibles et vénéneux, pour la détermination rapide des principales espèces de France (P. Dupont, Paris, 1895). with Léon Jean Marie Dufour (1862-1942),
- Les végétaux et les milieux cosmiques (F. Alcan, Paris, 1898).
- Le Mythe du chêne marin (E. Leroux, Paris, 1899).
- La nature tropicale (F. Alcan, Paris, 1899).
- L'Hérédité acquise, ses conséquences horticoles, agricoles et médicales (Durand, Chartres, 1901) – Acquired heredity, its horticultural, agricultural and medical consequences.
- Le transformisme appliqué à l'agriculture (F. Alcan, Paris, 1906) – Transformism applied to agriculture.
- La Vie des orchidées (Flammarion, Paris, 1917).
- Éléments de botanique with Philippe Van Tieghem (1839-1914) (Masson, Paris, 1918).
- Atlas des orchidées cultivées (Paris, 1927) – Atlas of cultivated orchids.
