= Nyasaland Volunteer Reserve =

- A detachment of the Nyasaland Volunteer Reserve at Karonga, c. 1914
- Active: 1901-c. 1941
- Country: Nyasaland
- Allegiance: British Empire
- Branch: British Colonial Auxiliary Forces
- Type: Infantry
- Role: Internal security
- Size: ~200 men
- Nickname: "Never Very Reliables"
- Engagements: World War I; East African campaign; Chilembwe uprising

The Nyasaland Volunteer Reserve (NVR) was a British Colonial Auxiliary Forces unit raised in the British protectorate of Nyasaland (modern-day Malawi). The British Central Africa Volunteer Reserve was formally established by the colonial government in 1901 and was renamed when the protectorate became Nyasaland in 1907. In the initial years the unit was little more than a rifle shooting club with no uniform and no military training. The NVR was placed on a more formal standing in 1908 under the Volunteer Ordinance. This implemented residency and racial requirements for membership and made provision for the unit to be mobilised by the governor. The unit was initially formed of four sections but grew to seven sections by 1914 and by 1930 the unit had ten.

In the lead-up to the First World War the NVR was placed on a more military footing, with a regular officer appointed as adjutant. The Volunteer Ordinance was amended in 1914 and the racial origin requirement removed. Attempts were made to provide training to NVR members in modern military weapons, reconnaissance and communications. A Khaki uniform was also introduced. Upon the outbreak of war the unit grew rapidly from 143 men to around 200. Members of the unit participated in the 13 August 1914 attack on the German steamship Hermann von Wissmann at Sphinx Hafen, the first naval action of the war. The unit also fought in the 9 September Battle of Karonga, defeating a German force sent into northern Nyasaland. The NVR and the King's African Rifles (KAR) were involved in the suppression of the January 1915 Chilembwe uprising against British rule in Nyasaland. The NVR participated in recriminatory attacks and the summary execution of suspected rebels.

Some NVR members also fought in the May 1915 attack on Sphinx Hafen which destroyed the Hermann von Wissmann. After the start of the Anglo-Belgian Tabora Offensive in May 1916 it was decided that the NVR was too small to function as an independent unit and its personnel were detached to become KAR officers, or to function as intelligence and transport specialists in other units. The NVR was demobilised on 27 November 1918, having suffered 16 war-related deaths. Post-war the unit struggled to attract volunteers and the Nyasaland government proposed abolishing the NVR or merging it with the police. It is not known when the unit was disestablished, but it remained in existence as late as 1941.

== Formation and early years ==
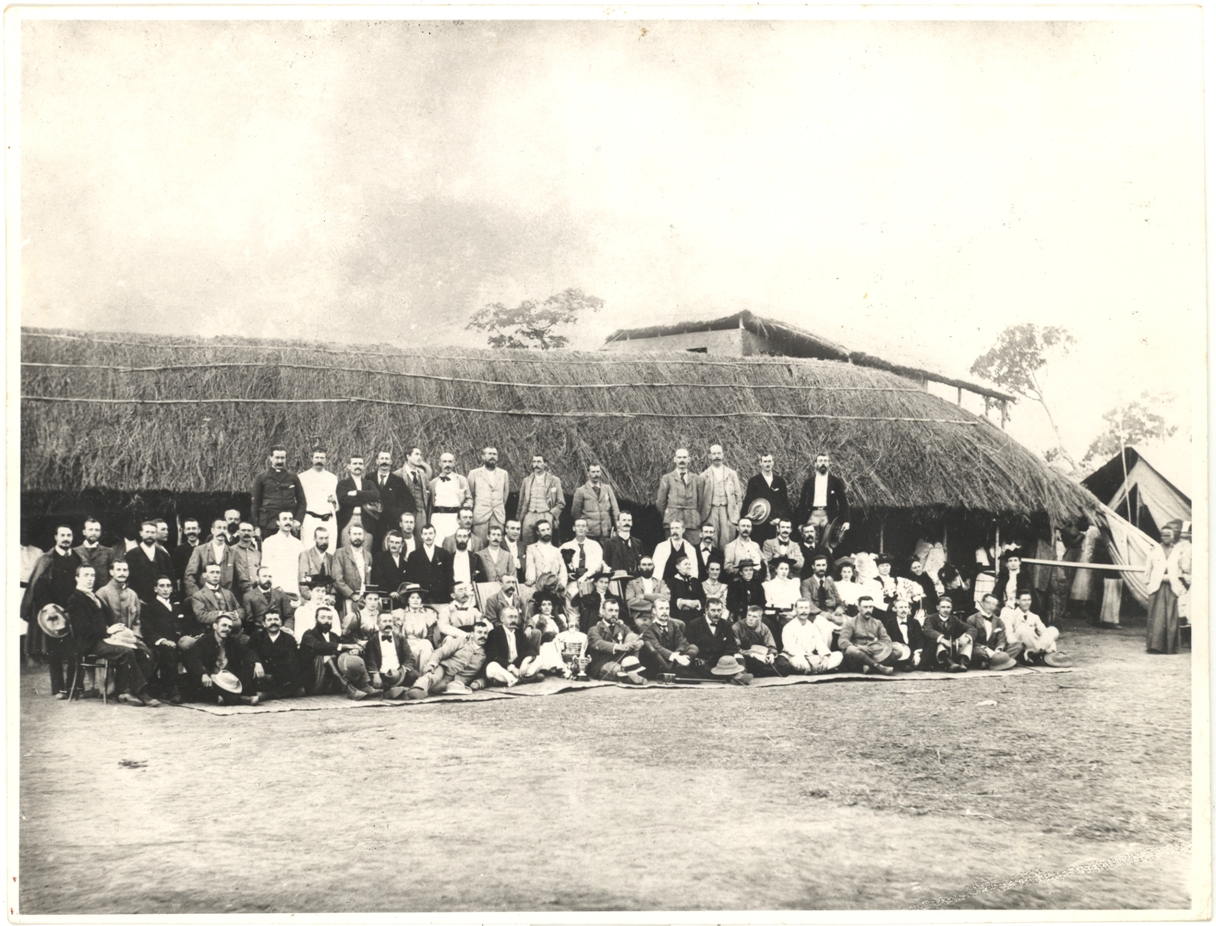
The entire European population of Blantyre in 1897, some 75 people

The volunteer movement saw reserve units formed across the British Empire from 1859. The movement led the early British settlers of the British Central Africa Protectorate to form their own unit in 1900. This grew from a number of private rifle shooting clubs that had formed by 1897. The aim of the members was to form a reserve of trained marksmen for use by the government of the protectorate in times of emergency. The government supported these efforts and, in the Nyasaland Government Gazette, called for an initial meeting of potential members on 17 October 1901. This proved successful and the government proclaimed the establishment of the British Central Africa Volunteer Reserve. It was organised around "sections", the first of which was established at Chiromo on 28 October (this was later known as the Lower Shire and then the Port Herald section). Other sections were formed at Blantyre on 6 November, Fort Johnston on 21 November and Zomba on 30 November; though in later times the Zomba section claimed to have been the first to have been established.

At first the unit operated as little more than a continuation of the rifle clubs but in 1902 they received government issue Martini–Enfield single-shot breach-loading rifles. The volunteer reserve continued its civilian traditions; it was managed by an "organising secretary" and members in this period paid a subscription, much like they had to the rifle clubs. The protectorate was renamed as Nyasaland in 1907 and the unit became the Nyasaland Volunteer Reserve (NVR). In 1907-08 the government issued newer Lee–Enfield magazine-fed rifles.

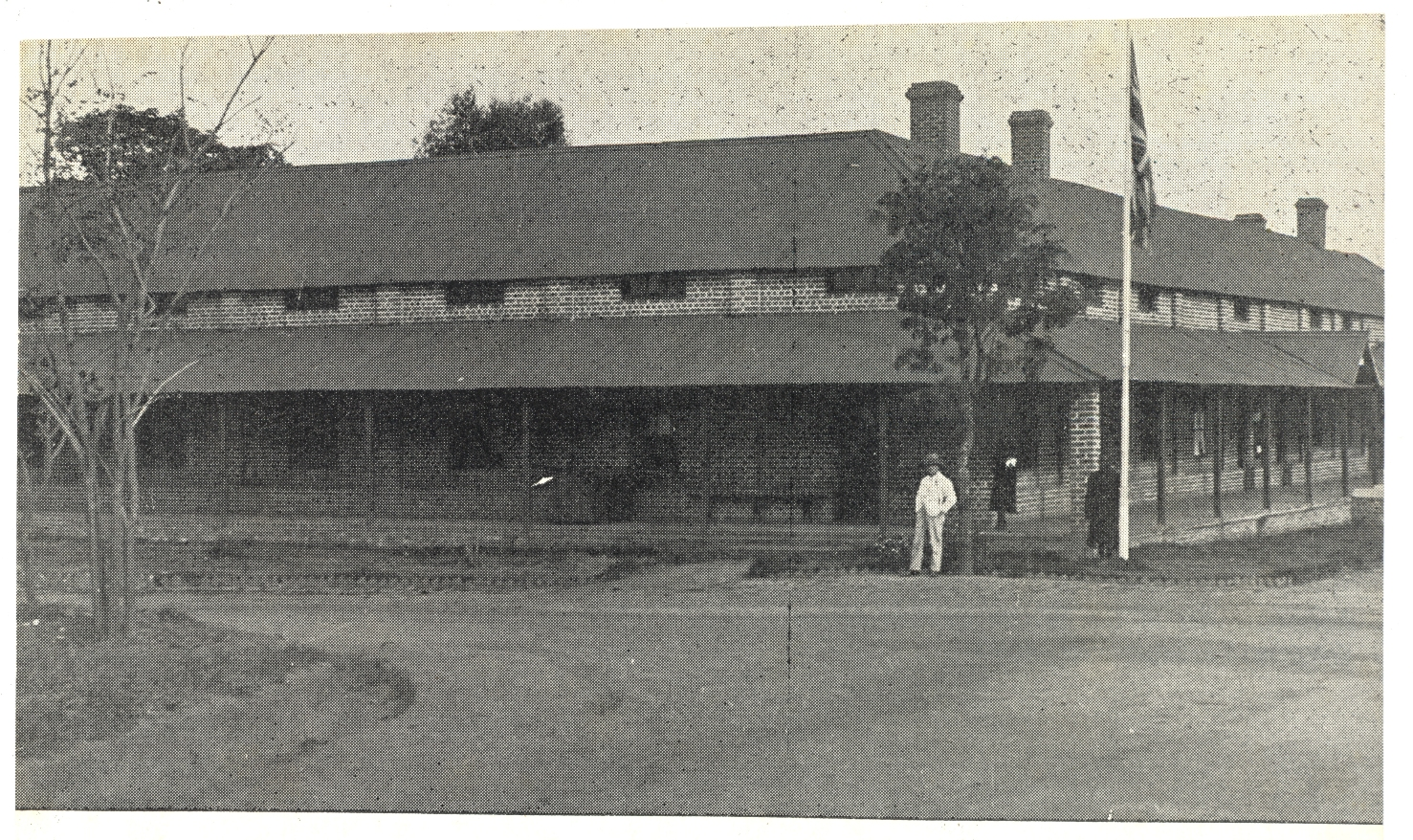
The government offices at Blantyre, 1907

In November 1908 the Nyasaland government placed the volunteer reserve on a more formal standing. The rules governing the unit were replaced by a Volunteer Ordinance passed by the protectorate's legislative council. Under the new rules each section had to maintain a minimum of ten men and each new member had to be nominated by two existing volunteers and receive the approval of a central committee. The volunteers were required to attend six marksmanship sessions a year at which each would fire a minimum of 21 rounds. Volunteers who achieved a score of 45 (under National Rifle Association of the United Kingdom rules) received a supplement of £1 per year and those who scored 25 points from 10 shots fired from a kneeling position at a 200-yard (180 m) target received a supplement of 10 shillings. There was no requirement for training in any formal military drill or to attend parades and no uniform was issued.

The new ordinance stipulated that each volunteer had to be of European origin, at least 16 years old and resident in the protectorate. An oath had to be sworn by each man and a £20 bond lodged to receive a rifle from government stocks. Each man received 200 rifles rounds per year for private practice and were required to maintain a minimum of 100 rounds in case of emergency mobilisation. The volunteers could purchase an additional 300 rounds each year at cost-price from the government. The Volunteer Ordinance gave the governor the power to call out the unit. It also established a fifth section in Neno District and two years later the NVR stood at 140 strong.

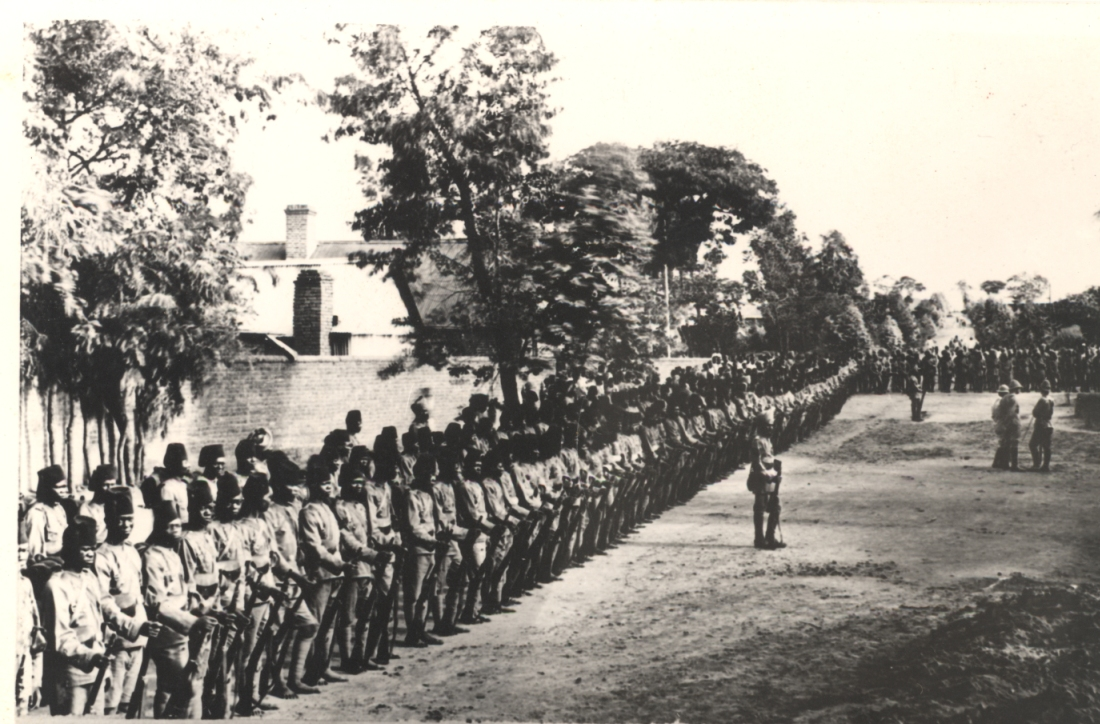
A unit of the KAR in Nyasaland

The NVR members competed in shooting competitions against the volunteer reserves of the British East African colonies of Kenya and Uganda. The NVR seems to have had some, perhaps informal, oversight from the King's African Rifles (KAR), the African-manned regular army regiment of British East Africa. In 1911 the KAR's inspector-general, Colonel George Thesiger, recommended that the NVR received military training and practice drills, but this was not implemented. However, the NVR was placed on a more military-style footing from 1913 when, on 24 July, former KAR officer Captain C. W. Barton was appointed adjutant and intelligence officer and, on 28 August, the post of organising secretary was abolished. One of Barton's first actions was to attempt to form a sixth section at Magomero, where A. L. Bruce Estates had donated land for a shooting range, but he was unable to find the ten recruits necessary. He succeeded in raising a section at Mlanje on 16 February 1914.

The Volunteer Ordinance was amended in February 1914. The racial origin requirements and oath of allegiance were abolished and volunteers were required to participate in 15 hours of military instruction per year. Five shilling supplements were paid to volunteers who completed 15-hour courses in semaphore; map making and reconnaissance; the use of Maxim and Nordenfelt machine guns and field artillery; and Morse code. Also in February 1914 Barton finally found enough men to establish the sixth section at Magomero and a seventh at Mikalongwe. Khaki uniforms were also introduced around this time, apparently to be provided at the cost of the volunteer (though from 1917 the government issued uniforms free of charge). Photographs from the First World War show the uniform to consist of a long-sleeved khaki shirt, khaki shorts, a solar topee, blue puttees and black boots. A leather belt and ammunition bandolier were also worn. The shoulder straps were yellow with the letters 'NVR' stencilled on in black (yellow and black being colours associated with the protectorate). A metal 'NVR' badge later replaced the stencilling.

== First World War ==
=== Early actions ===
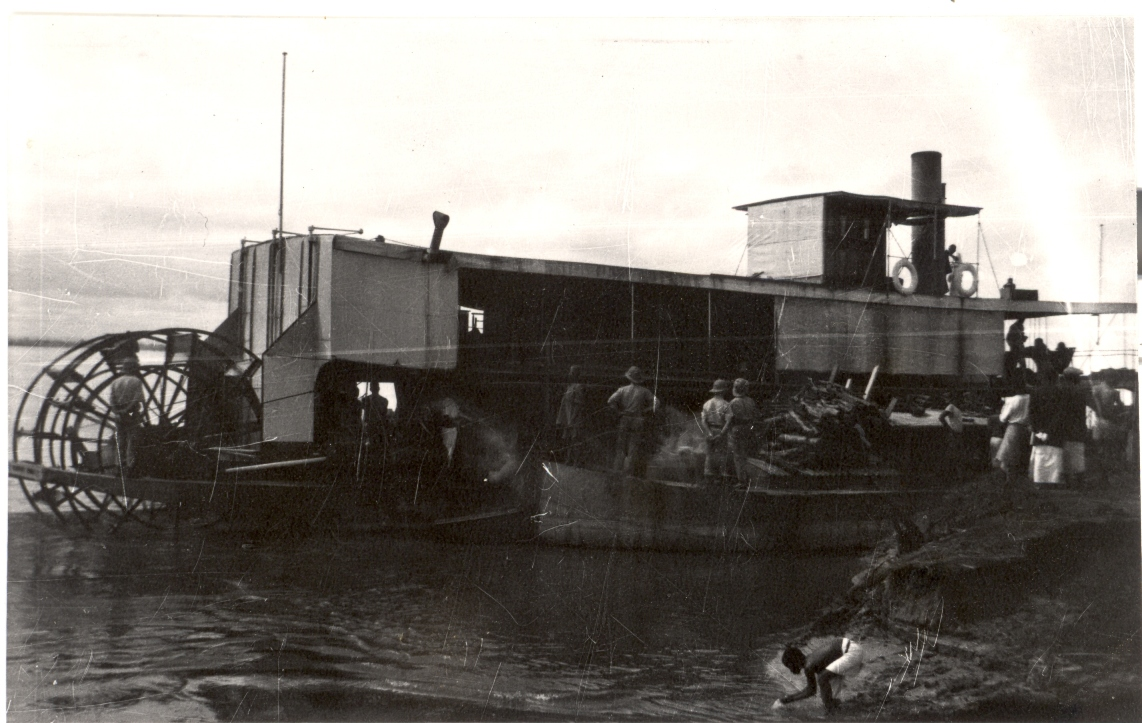
A British steamer carrying troops to Nyasaland

In December 1913 the NVR had a strength of 143 men. It was considered too small to function as a separate unit on active service and so, in times of war, the plan was to use the unit as a source of officers for new battalions of native troops, with a residual unit of 50 men to serve as local guards. Following the outbreak of the First World War in late July 1914 Charles Thorburn, formerly of the Royal Scots Fusiliers, was appointed commanding officer of the NVR on 5 August. The NVR were mobilised by Nyasaland governor Sir George Smith on 20 August, by which point some members of the unit had already participated in action, on their own initiative. In one of the opening actions of the East African campaign, a number of NVR men helped man the steamship Gwendolen during a 13 August attack on the German vessel Hermann von Wissmann at Sphinx Hafen on Lake Nyasa. The German vessel was temporarily disabled in the first naval action of the war.

The membership of the NVR rose rapidly in the first weeks of the war. The Magomero section rose from 10 members in February 1914 to 14 in July and 21 in August. The Port Herald section role from 11 to 28 and the Mlanje section from 12 to 24; giving a total strength of around 200 men. Indian residents at Blantyre and Limbe offered their services to the NVR on 1 August and, on 17 August, this offer was accepted by Thorburn who authorised a new sub-section of the unit at Limbe. Within a week 16 Indian employees of the Shire Highlands Railway Company had enlisted. In September a shooting range was constructed at Limbe by the railway and Imperial Tobacco, this was also used by forces of the KAR. The Limbe section proved popular with British residents of the town who had previously travelled to the Blantyre section house. The Limbe sub-section was established as a formal section of the NVR by order of 31 March 1916 and during the war peaked at 43 members, of whom 30 were of Indian ethnicity. During the war almost the entire British male military age population of the protectorate served in the NVR (the total British population, including women and children, was around 800).

Gordon Merriman, a Nyasaland planter and member of the reserve killed 9 September 1914 and buried at Karonga

Later in August German forces crossed into Nyasaland from Tanganyika. A force of the NVR numbering around 2 officers and 54 men underwent 10 days of training at Zomba before being dispatched by steamship to Karonga in northern Nyasaland. They arrived on 5 September to join the Nyasaland Field Force, led by Barton, which included troops from the KAR. The German Massoko Schutztruppe company advanced on Karonga, which they expected to be undefended. At the same time the Nyasaland Field Force moved north to engage the Germans that Barton thought were posted to Kaporo. Barton's single column marched right in between the two southbound German columns, unnoticed in the dense bush despite passing within 1 mile (1.6 km) of each other.

On 9 September the German columns launched an attack on the British left to guard the fort at Karonga. This small force, of just 11 Europeans (with three women), 39 KAR askari and 32 policemen held the fort with small arms and four obsolete muzzle-loading cannon. Gunfire from this engagement alerted Barton to the presence of the Germans to his rear. He sent the 1st battalion of the KAR cross country to the fort while he led the remainder of the force, which included the NVR, to the coast of Lake Nyasa to cut off the German line of retreat. Both sides were around 350-400 men strong.

The KAR battalion fell upon the German rear at Karonga which caused them to retreat into Barton's ambush. A short engagement resulted in at least 7 German officers and 51 soldiers killed and 3 officers, 31 rifle-armed askari and 42 spear-armed askari captured. British losses amounted to 2 officers, 3 NVR and 8 KAR askari killed with 3 officers, 4 NVR and 42 askari wounded. One NVR soldier, who had been left to man a supply barge, was captured by the German force. Corporal Stima of the NVR received the African Distinguished Conduct Medal for taking over a Maxim gun from a mortally wounded comrade (he received a bar for further bravery in action at Tandala on 19 February 1917). The two officers killed at Karonga are sometimes misidentified as NVR men as the unit is stated on their gravestones. However they are alo named on the KAR memorial at Zomba and appear to be unattached government officers.

After the Battle of Karonga the NVR served on the northern frontier of Nyasaland taking part in patrols and skirmishes until December 1914 when the rainy season put a halt to operations and many of the NVR were permitted to return to their peacetime work. During the early stages of the war the position of organising secretary was reinstated and a transport officer and supply officer appointed to the NVR.

=== Chilembwe uprising ===
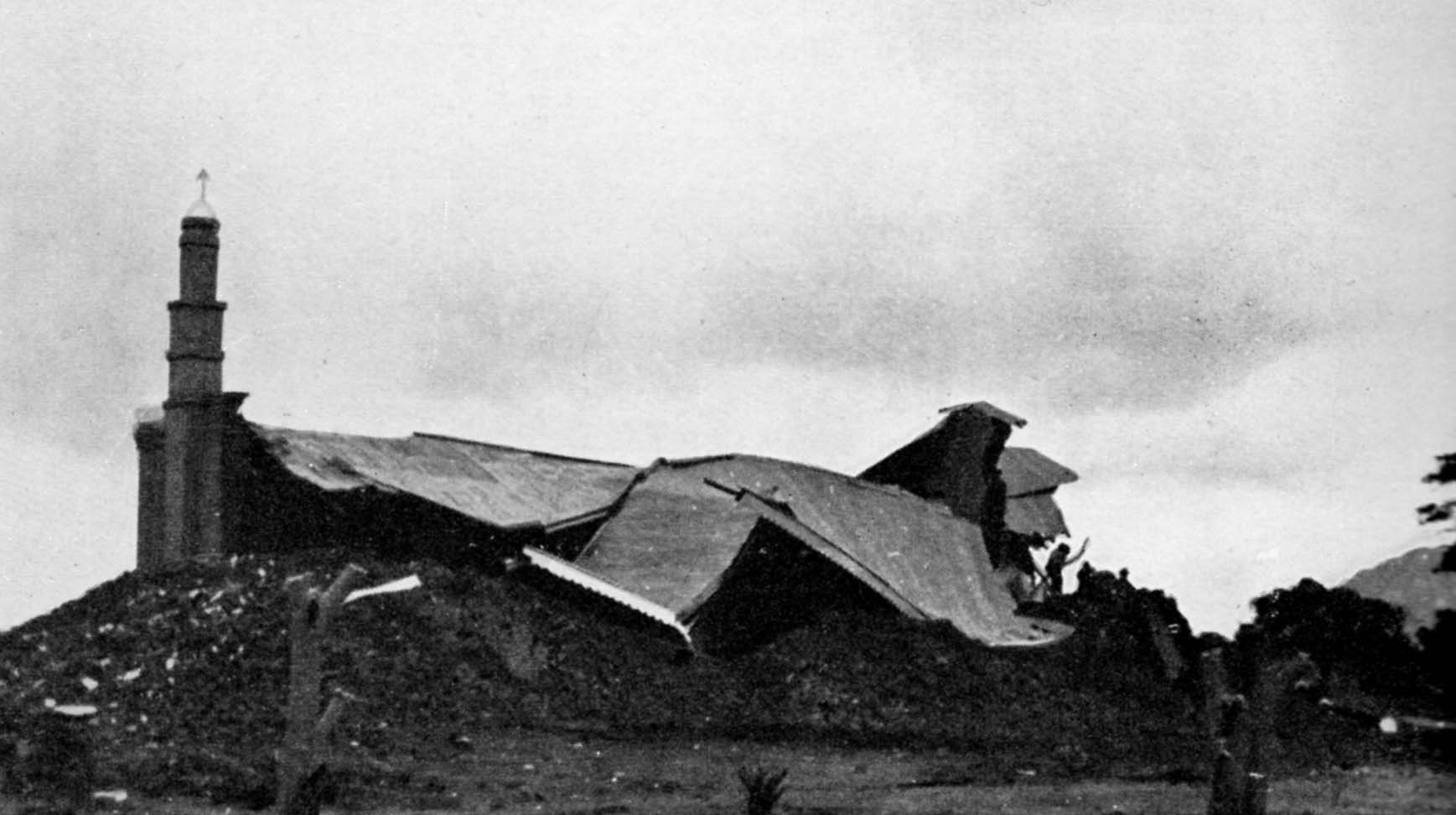
Chilembwe's church after being destroyed by the NVR

The NVR were deployed during the Chilembwe uprising, a rebellion against British colonial rule launched by African preacher John Chilembwe. It began with an attack on the Bruce Estates at Magomero on 23 January 1915, apparently in an attempt to seize the NVR arsenal there, during which three European planters were killed. European civilians withdrew to fortified locations in Blantyre, Limbe, Zomba, Cholo, Mlanje and elsewhere while armed parties of the NVR, KAR, colonial police and civilians carried out patrols, some by motorcycle.

One NVR member apparently escaped an attack by his servants when a plot was revealed by his junior pantry servant. The volunteer's cook, house and pantry servants were arrested and shot dead by an NVR firing party. Four rebels caught in Mandala were summarily executed by a detachment of the NVR and other prisoners are known to have been subject to summary executions. The Mikalongwe NVR section took a particularly active role in recriminatory attacks, being described as acting like a posse on the American frontier, though around 100 KAR soldiers were also involved in such activities. There was widespread burning of African-owned houses. An NVR member named Casson was noted for his attempts to stop the recriminatory attacks.

A detachment of the NVR captured Chilembwe's mission at Mbombwe on 26 January 1915 and blew up Chilembwe's church. Chilembwe was shot dead by a police patrol on 3 February and the uprising ceases by 6 February. Those NVR men involved in suppressing the Chilembwe Uprising received the Africa General Service Medal with the "Nyasaland 1915" clasp.

=== Later war ===
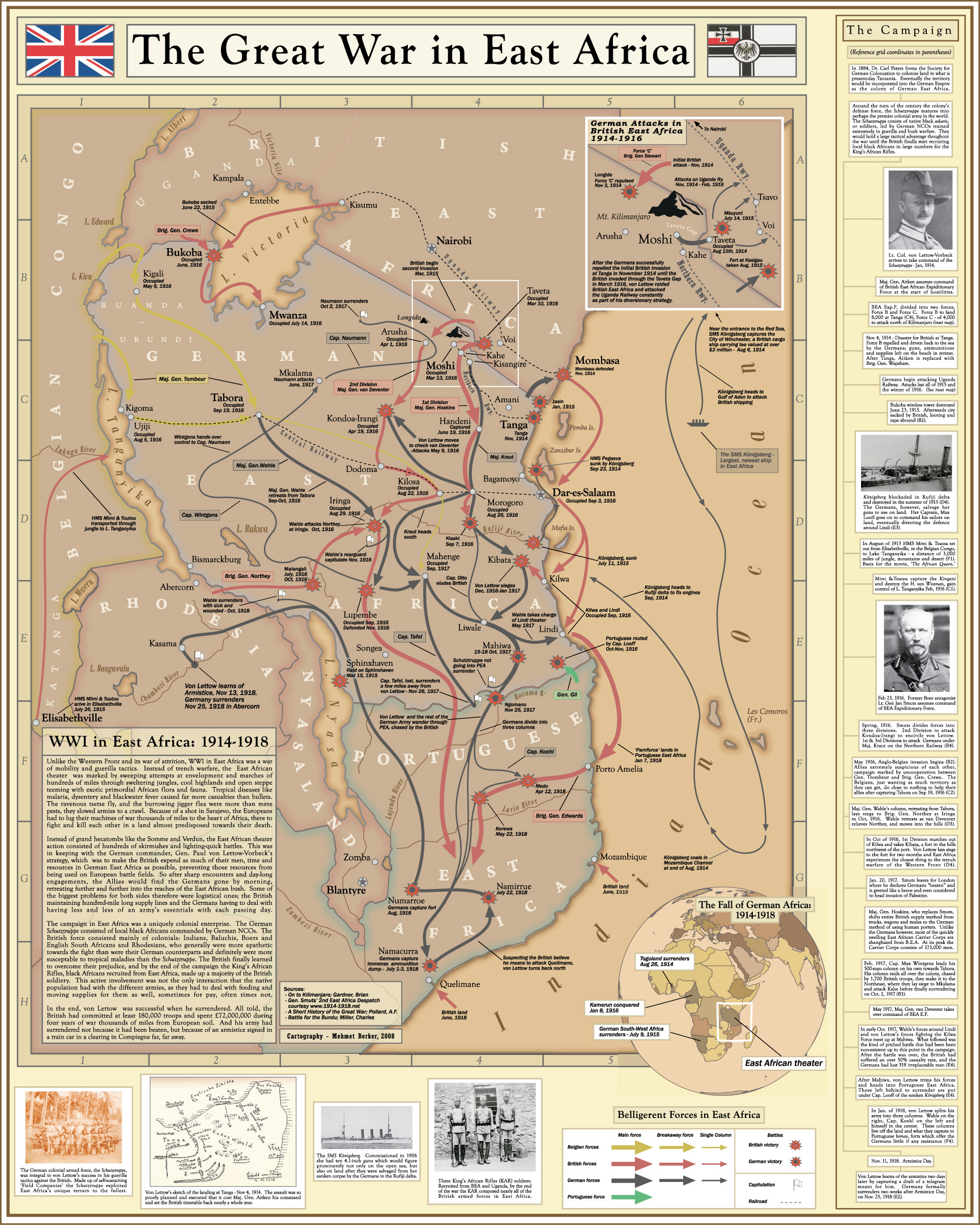
A map showing British and German movements in East Africa during the war

In May 1915 some of the NVR took part in the second attack on Sphinx Hafen, once again travelling on board the Gwendolen as well as the steamer Chauncy Maples. Having landed a short distance to the south of the port a force of the KAR and NVR launched a bayonet charge on the German fort. The German garrison fled and the Hermann von Wissmann and her slipway were destroyed by dynamite. The British force afterwards boarded their vessels under machine-gun fire and withdrew. One NVR volunteer was wounded in this engagement.

A detachment of troops from South Africa was sent to support the NVR in Northern Nyasaland in August 1915 and was known as the Union Central African Imperial Service Contingent. One member of this unit, Owen Letcher, wrote a book about his experiences. He described the NVR of this period as being formed of railway workers and farmers from Nyasland, Northern Rhodesia, the Belgian Congo and Portuguese African territories, together with a number of Frenchmen and 1-2 Russians. Letcher noted the presence of a number of missionaries in the NVR where they were employed in transport and logistics roles and also that of the Nyasaland government hangman who Letcher regarded as particularly adept at motivating the porters. Letcher the African Chewa and Swahili languages, which made them valuable as interpreters to the porters and local population, and that the volunteers wore no badges of rank and each received the same pay (10 shillings a day). Upon first arriving the South Africans referred to the NVR volunteers as the "Never Very Reliables" as they thought they were suited only to guarding the lines of communication. Letcher writes that this practice soon stopped after the NVR proved themselves in action. Letcher's report appeared in the newspapers in September 1917 and parts were published in his 1930 book Cohort of the Tropics.

In May 1916 British forces, acting in conjunction with Belgian troops from the Congo, crossed into German East Africa as part of the Tabora Offensive. It was decided at this point that the NVR should cease to act as an independent unit and it was broken up with individuals serving as officers in the KAR or as logistics or intelligence officers with other units. The NVR was demobilised on 27 November 1918, after the 11 November general armistice. The Commonwealth War Graves Commission recorded that sixteen NVR members died on active service during the war, fifteen volunteers/privates and one second lieutenant. Thirteen of the men are buried in Nyasaland (three at Zomba, six at Karonga and four at Fort Johnston) and three are buried in Tanganyika (two at Iringa and one at Dar es Salaam). One further NVR volunteer died from a war-related cause in March 1919 and is buried in Zomba. The African inhabitants of Nyasaland could serve with the Carrier Corps and during the war around 4,400 were killed or died of disease on service.

== Post-war ==
Nyasaland Volunteer Reserve became known as the Nyasaland Defence Force in official orders from 1920 but little is known of its post-war activities. On 31 December 1921 the unit strength stood at 270, of whom 31 were Indian and the remainder European. It proved difficult to interest settlers in joining the unit after the war with some blaming the splitting of the unit in 1916 as affecting its reputation. At one point the Nyasaland legislative council discussed abolishing the unit or merging it with the police force. On 19 December 1921 Major A. A. Fen was appointed as staff officer and organising secretary, being replaced by Major H. E. Greene on 24 August 1924. By 1930 the NVR had ten sections stationed at Zomba, Blantyre, Port Herald, Namwera, Mlanje, Chiradzulu, Limbe, Mikalongwe, Fort Lister and Dedza. Greene remained in post as commander of the NVR until at least 1932 but was gone by November 1935 at which point the position was vacant. A P. L. Batcock was appointed paymaster and quartermaster on 1 May 1938. The later history of the unit is not known but it remained in existence until at least 1941.
