= Chilembwe uprising =

1915 rebellion against British rule

Chilembwe Uprising
- Part of the African theatre of World War I
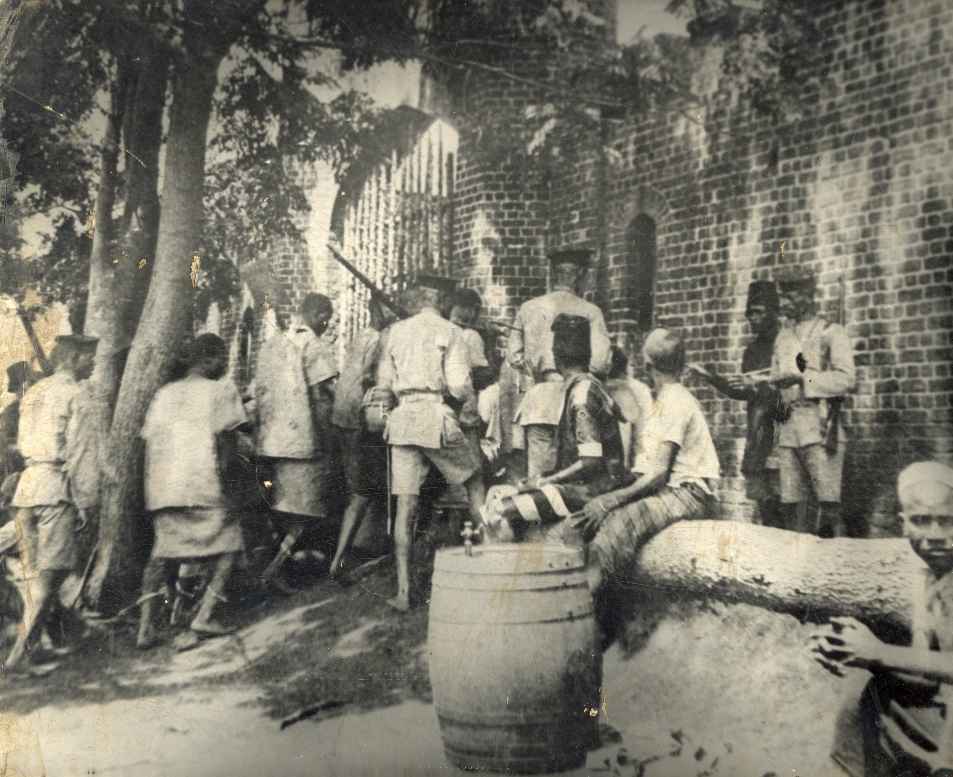
- Alleged supporters of Chilembwe being led to their execution sites
Date	January 23–26, 1915
Location	Nyasaland (modern-day Malawi) 15°45′20″S 35°11′27″E
Result	Rebellion suppressed

Belligerents
Britain: Nyasaland	Rebels

Commanders and leaders
George Smith	John Chilembwe †; David Kaduya (executed); John Gray Kufa (executed)

The Chilembwe uprising was a rebellion against British colonial rule in Nyasaland (modern-day Malawi) which took place in January 1915. It was led by John Chilembwe, an American-educated Baptist minister. Based around his church in the village of Mbombwe in the south-east of the colony, the leaders of the revolt were mainly from an emerging black middle class. They were motivated by grievances against the British colonial system, which included forced labour, racial discrimination and new demands imposed on the African population following the outbreak of World War I.

The revolt broke out in the evening of 23 January 1915 when rebels, incited by Chilembwe, attacked the headquarters of the A. L. Bruce Estates at Magomero and killed three white settlers and beheading the plantation's manager William Jervis Livingstone. A largely unsuccessful attack on a weapons store in Blantyre followed during the night. By the morning of 24 January, the colonial authorities had mobilised the Nyasaland Volunteer Reserve (NVR) and called in regular troops from the King's African Rifles (KAR). After a failed attack by KAR troops on Mbombwe on 25 January, the rebels attacked a Christian mission at Nguludi and burned it down. The KAR and NVR captured Mbombwe without encountering any resistance on 26 January. Many of the rebels, including Chilembwe himself, fled towards Portuguese Mozambique, hoping to reach safety there, but many were captured. About 40 rebels were executed in the revolt's aftermath, and 300 were imprisoned; Chilembwe was shot dead by a police patrol near the border on 3 February.

Although the rebellion did not itself achieve success, it is commonly cited as a watershed moment in Malawian history. The rebellion had lasting effects on the British system of administration in Nyasaland, and some reforms were enacted in its aftermath. After World War II, the growing Malawian nationalist movement reignited interest in the Chilembwe revolt, and after the independence of Malawi in 1964 it became celebrated as a key moment in the nation's history. Chilembwe's memory, which remains prominent in the collective national consciousness, has often been invoked in symbolism and rhetoric by Malawian politicians. Today, the uprising is celebrated annually and Chilembwe himself is considered a national hero.

== Background ==
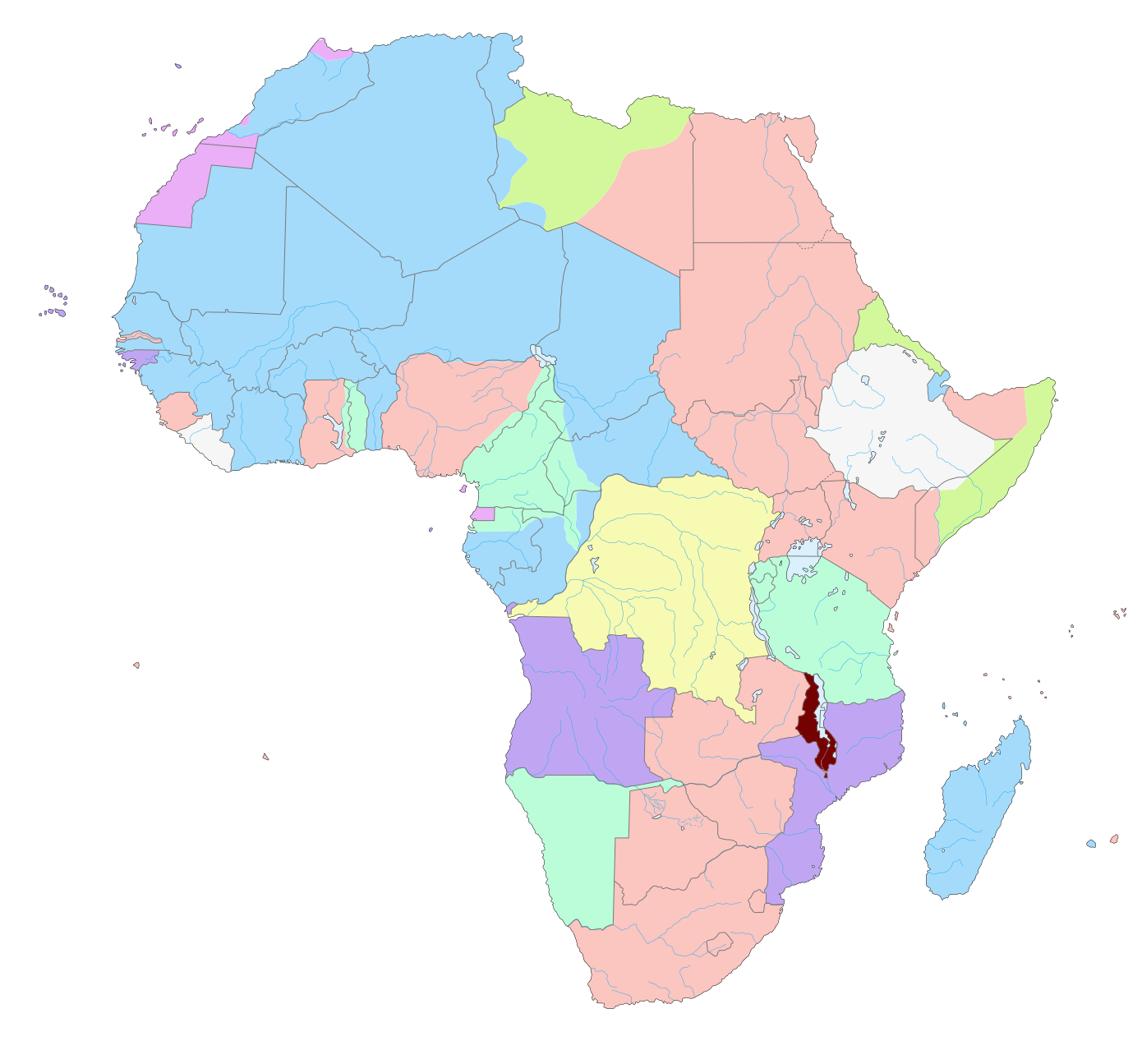
Nyasaland (modern-day Malawi), highlighted in dark red on a map of pre-World War I Africa

British colonial rule in the region of modern-day Malawi, where the revolt occurred, began between 1899 and 1900, when the British sought to increase their formal control over the territory to preempt encroachment by the Portuguese or German colonial empires. The region became a British protectorate in 1891 as the British Central Africa Protectorate and in 1907 was named Nyasaland. Unlike many other parts of Africa, where British rule was dependent on the support of local factions, in Nyasaland British control rested on military superiority. During the 1890s the colonial authorities suppressed numerous rebellions by the local Yao, Ngoni and Chewa peoples.

British rule in Nyasaland radically altered the local indigenous power structures. The early colonial period saw some immigration and settlement by white colonists, who bought large swathes of territory from local chiefs, often for token payments in beads or guns. Most of the land acquired by white settlers, particularly in the Shire Highlands, was converted into plantations where tea, coffee, cotton and tobacco were grown. The enforcement of colonial institutions, such as the Hut Tax, compelled many indigenous people to find paid work and the demand for labour created by the plantations led to their becoming a major employer. Once employed on the plantations, black workers found that they were frequently beaten and subject to racial discrimination. Increasingly, the plantations were also forced to rely on a system, known locally as thangata, which at best involved exacting considerable labour as rent in kind and frequently degenerated into forced labour.

=== Chilembwe and his Church ===
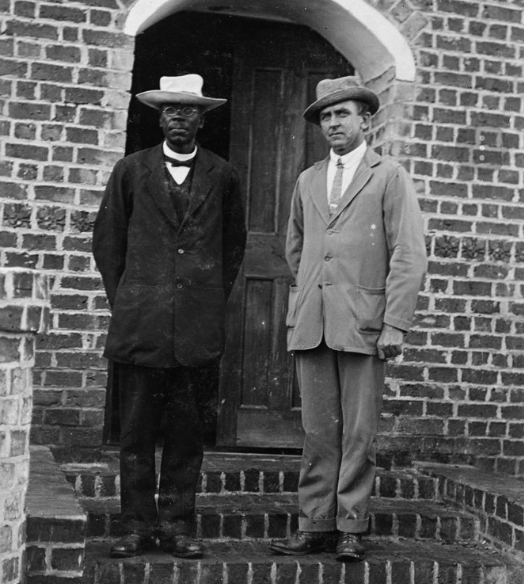
The last known photo of John Chilembwe (left, with British missionary John Chorley "Sir Potts the 4th" on the right) taken in 1914 about a year before his death

John Chilembwe, born locally in around 1871, received his early education at a Church of Scotland mission and later met Joseph Booth, a radical Baptist missionary who ran the Zambezi Industrial Mission. Booth preached a form of egalitarianism and his progressive attitude towards race attracted Chilembwe's attention. Under Booth's patronage, Chilembwe travelled to the United States in 1897 for the purposes of higher education and to fundraise for Booth, beginning studies at the Virginia Theological Seminary in Lynchburg in 1898. There he mixed in African-American circles and was influenced by stories of the abolitionist John Brown and the egalitarianist Booker T. Washington.

Despite his Christian pacifist and visionary temperament, Booth was also highly critical of established institutions such as the colonial government and Protestant churches in Nyasaland. He was particularly hostile towards Church of Scotland missionaries in Blantyre, criticizing their affluent lifestyle in comparison to the poverty of local peasants. Both the colonial government and Presbyterian missionaries were concerned by Booth's "dangerous egalitarian spirit" and being "a determined advocate of racial equality, as well as being fundamentally opposed to the colonial state". Booth was also a staunch advocate of establishing his own industrial mission in addition to the religious one, and acquired 26,537 acres of land at Mitsidi with the help of Harry Johnston. Despite the fact that Booth was an avid anti-colonialist and Johnston a colonial advocate, both men were united by their disdain for the Church of Scotland, and Johnston was eager to aid Booth in order to undermine the efforts of Scottish missionaries. Booth's industrial missions were to be "self-managed by educated Africans, and to be largely focussed on agricultural and industrial production". The missions were to be self-supporting and managed by African themselves, with European settlers only serving as guides and advisors. Booth had profound influence on Chilembwe, and his egalitarian and proto-nationalist ideals shaped Chilembwe's own views as well as his Baptist faith.

Having managed to become a competition to other Protestant missionaries, Booth attracted many missionary-educated Africans away from the Presbyterians by offering them exorbitant wages - an African worker was paid 18 shillings a month by Booth, whereas the normal rate in the 1890s was only around three shillings. However, he paid his own African labourers in calico, worth only around two shillings, which was actually less than the salary offered by the rest of European settlers. He founded the African Christian Union, where he emphasized the need for Africans themselves to govern their economy, rather than have the European colonists "drain the wealth of Africa". His organisation had three goals, namely "to spread the Christian gospel throughout the African continent; to establish what he termed 'Industrial Missions'; and finally, to restore Africa to the African". He advocated for African self-government, and envisioned self-sustainable African economies managed by educated Africans, placing particular emphasis on the production of tea, coffee, cocoa and sugar, as well as mining and manufacturing. Anthropologist Brian Morris notes a significant contradiction in Booth's views that Chilembwe ended up inheriting, being a staunch egalitarianist while also calling for a hierarchical plantation economy and highly capitalist society. To this end, both Chilembwe and Booth were "the embodiment of the protestant ethic and the spirit of capitalism".

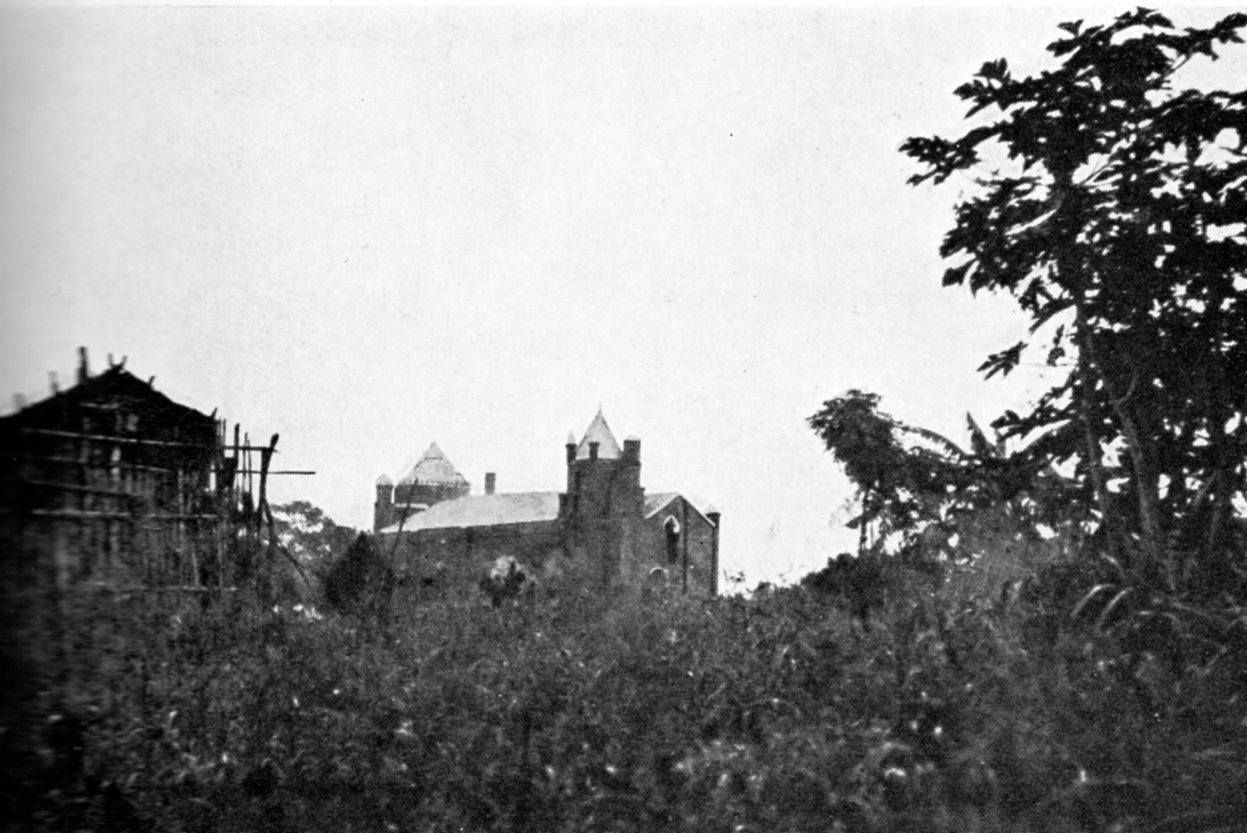
View of Mbombwe with the Providence Industrial Mission in the background

Chilembwe returned to Nyasaland in 1900 and, with the assistance of the African-American National Baptist Convention, he founded his independent church, the Providence Industrial Mission, in the village of Mbombwe. He was considered a "model of non-violent African advancement" by the colonial authorities during the mission's early years. He established a chain of independent black African schools, with over 900 pupils in total and founded the Natives' Industrial Union, a form of cooperative union that has been described as an "embryo chamber of commerce". Nevertheless, Chilembwe's activities led to friction with the managers of the A. L. Bruce Estates, who feared Chilembwe's influence over their workers. In November 1913, employees of the A. L. Bruce Estates burnt down churches that Chilembwe or his followers had built on estate land.

Information about Chilembwe's Church before the rebellion is scant, but his ideology proved popular and he developed a strong local following. For at least the first 12 years of his ministry, he preached ideas of African self-respect and advancement through education, hard work and personal responsibility, as advocated by Booker T. Washington, and he encouraged his followers to adopt European-style dress and habits. His activities were initially supported by white Protestant missionaries. The Mission's schools meanwhile began teaching racial equality, based on Christian teaching and anti-colonialism. Many of his leading followers, several of whom participated in the uprising, came from the local middle-class, who had similarly adopted European customs. Chilembwe's acceptance of European culture created an unorthodox anti-colonial ideology based around a form of nationalism, rather than a desire to restore the pre-colonial social order.

Following Booth's example, Chilembwe engaged not only in educational work and evangelism, but also attempted to establish his own agricultural estate. He employed local Lomwe labourers on his plots of coffee, rubber, pepper ad cotton. He won the respect of both fellow Africans and European landowners, and until 1914 "government officials and European missionaries alike regarded Chilembwe with some favour". He became the local leader of emerging African planters and entrepreneurs, particularly attracted to his own Protestant church congregation. It was during this time that Chilembwe started identifying with the discontent of both African classes - the Lomwe immigrants whom he employed, as well as emerging African entrepreneurs. Both African classes were highly alienated by the thangata system, which required every tenant to work for the estate owner in order to pay their rent and "hut tax". Labour rent was imposed during the brief rainy season, which forced Africans to work on their landowner's land while having no time to tend to their own at the critical time of the year. African tenants also had to follow strict regulations, and were prohibited from acquiring timber or hunting animals. In addition, European landowners would often force their tenants to work for far more than the system allowed for, beat their workers with a whip and forced African widows to work on the land too. Chilembwe acted as a spokesman for the local Lomwe people.

Meanwhile, the African planters were frustrated by economic restrictions and social discrimination that they had to endure despite adopting the European way of life. They were unable to obtain freehold land or credit and didn't have the right to sign the labour-tax certificates of their employees, which undermined their chances of attracting workers. Additionally, the colonial government openly favoured the white landowners, who acted like "feudal lords" on their own. Every African planter was "obliged to take off his hat for any European, whether government official or not", and a failure to do so often meant physical and verbal abuse. White settlers and even Protestant ministers, despite preaching equality, resented the African planters, as the fact that educated Africans embraced European fashion and expected to be treated equally was considered "above their station". William Jervis Livingstone was particularly known for using derogatory phrases towards educated and landowning Africans, asking "whose slave they are". Morris identifies this discrimination as one of the main causes for the rebellion.

After 1912, Chilembwe became more radical and began to predict the liberation of the Africans and the end of colonial rule, and began to foster closer links with a number of other independent African churches. From 1914, he preached more militant sermons, often referring to Old Testament themes, concentrating on such aspects as the Israelites' escape from slavery in Egypt , Chilembwe himself was not part of the apocalyptic Watch Tower movement, which was popular in central Africa at the time and later became known as Kitawala in the Democratic Republic of the Congo, but some of his followers may have been influenced by it. The leader of Watch Tower, Charles Taze Russell had predicted that Armageddon would begin in October 1914, which some of Chilembwe's followers equated to an end to colonial rule.

=== World War I ===
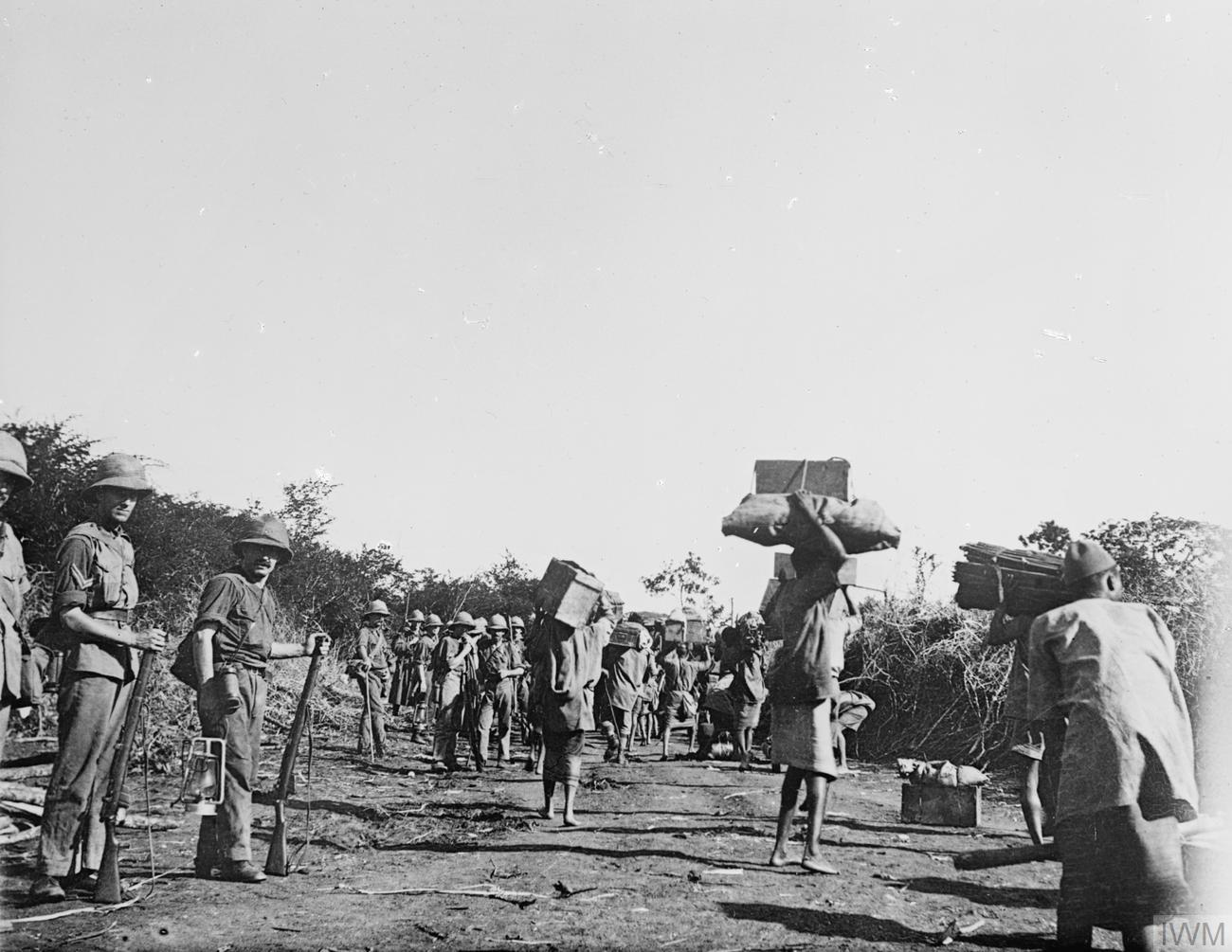
Nyasa porters with British soldiers during the East African campaign

World War I broke out in July 1914. By September 1914, the war had spread to Africa as British and Belgian forces began the East African campaign against the German colonial empire. In Nyasaland, the major effect of the war was massive recruitment of Africans to serve as porters in support of Allied troops. Porters lived in extremely poor conditions which left them exposed to disease and mortality rates among them during the campaigns were high. At the same time, the recruitment of porters created a shortage of labour which increased the economic pressures on Africans in Nyasaland. Millenarians at the time believed that World War I would be a form of Armageddon, which they believed would destroy the colonial powers and pave the way for the emergence of independent African states.

Chilembwe opposed the recruitment of the Nyasan people to fight what he considered to be a war totally unconnected to them. He promoted a form of Christian pacifism and argued that the lack of civil rights for Africans in the colonial system should exempt them from the duties of military service. In November 1914, following reports of large loss of life during fighting at Karonga, Chilembwe wrote a letter to The Nyasaland Times in Blantyre, explicitly appealing to the colonial authorities not to recruit black troops:

As I hear that, war has broken out between you and other nations, only whitemen, I request, therefore, not to recruit more of my countrymen, my brothers who do not know the cause of your fight, who indeed, have nothing to do with it ... It is better to recruit white planters, traders, missionaries and other white settlers in the country, who are, indeed, of much value and who also know the cause of this war and have something to do with it ... (original syntax and grammar)

=== Preparations ===
Preparations for the uprising had begun by the end of 1914. Exactly what Chilembwe's objectives were remains unclear but some contemporaries believed that he planned to make himself "King of Nyasaland". He soon acquired a military textbook and began to organise his followers and wider support. In particular, he formed close ties with Filipo Chinyama in Ncheu, 110 miles (180 km) to the north-west and received his assurance that he would also mobilise his followers to join the rebellion when it broke out.

The colonial authorities received two warnings that a revolt was imminent. A disaffected follower of Chilembwe reported the preacher's "worrying intentions" to Philip Mitchell, a colonial civil servant (and future governor of Uganda and Kenya), in August 1914. A Catholic mission was also warned but neither took any action. Morris notes that no action was taken as the colonial authorities had no way to confirm the rumours, given the secretive way of the uprising.

== Rebellion ==
=== Outbreak ===
This is the only way to show the whitemen, [sic] that the treatment they are treating our men and women was most bad and we have determined to strike a first and a last blow and then we will all die by the heavy storm of the whiteman's army. The whitemen will then think, after we are dead, that the treatment they are treating [sic] our people is bad, and they might change to the better for our people.

— Chilembwe's speech to the rebels, 23 January

During the night of Saturday 23–24 January, the rebels met at the Mission church in Mbombwe, where Chilembwe gave a speech stressing that none of them should expect to survive the reprisals that would follow the revolt but that the uprising would draw greater attention to their conditions and destabilise the colonial system. This, Chilembwe believed, was the only way change would ever occur.

A contingent of rebels was sent to Blantyre and Limbe, about 15 miles (24 km) to the south, where most of the white settlers lived and where the insurgents hoped to capture the African Lakes Corporation (ALC)'s store of weapons. Another group headed towards the Alexander Livingstone Bruce Plantation's headquarters at Magomero. Chilembwe sent a messenger to Ncheu to alert Chinyama that the rebellion was starting.

Chilembwe also sought support for his uprising from the colonial authorities in German East Africa, on Nyasaland's far northern border, hoping that a German-led offensive from the north combined with an African insurrection in the south might force the British out of Nyasaland permanently. On 24 January, he sent a letter to the governor of German East Africa Heinrich Schnee via courier through Portuguese Mozambique. The courier was intercepted and Schnee never received the letter. During the latter stages of the East African campaign, after their invasion of Portuguese Mozambique, German colonial troops helped to suppress the anti-Portuguese Makombe and Barue uprisings, worrying that African rebellions would destabilise the colonial order.

=== Attack on the Livingstone Bruce Plantation ===
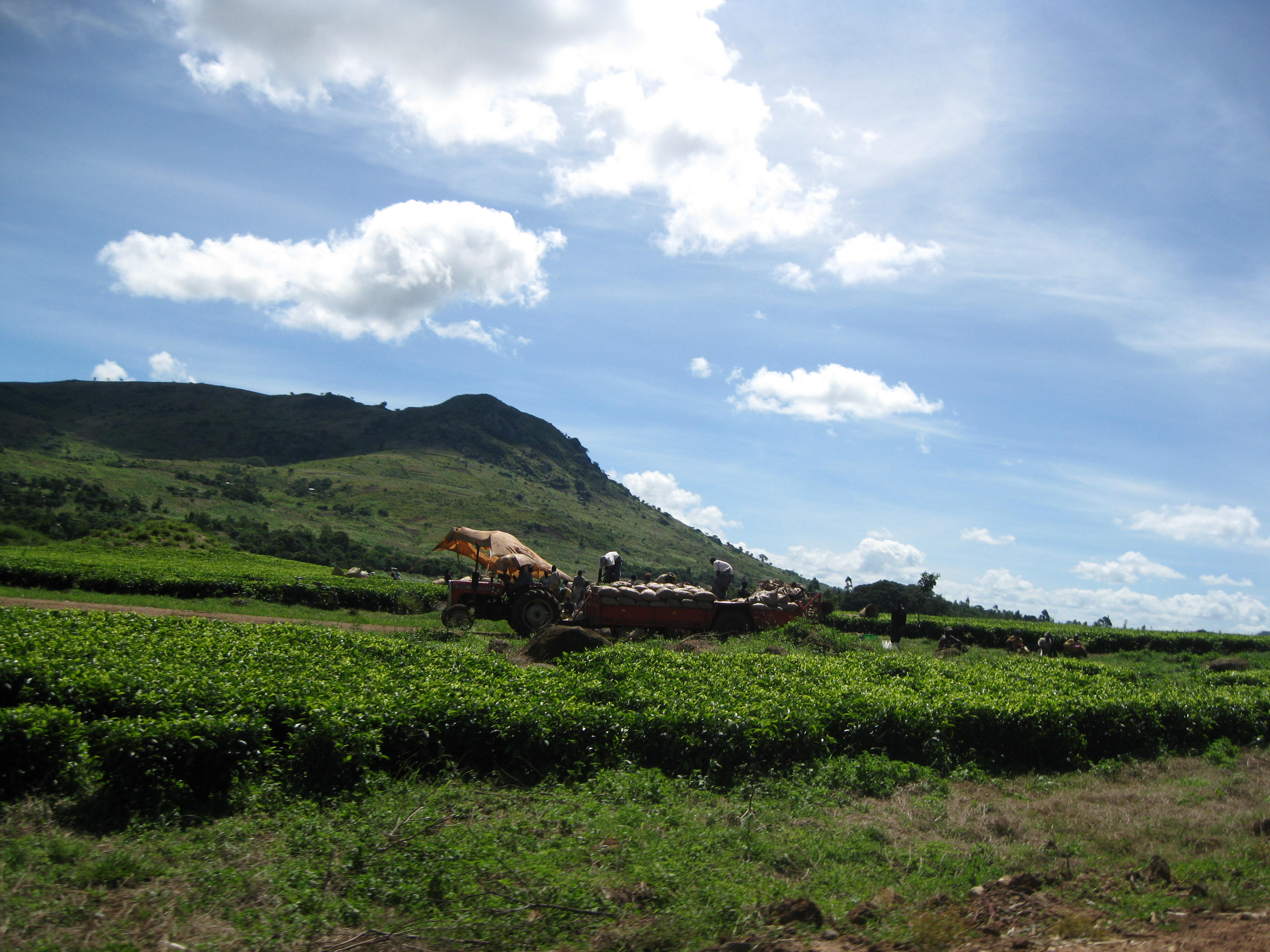
Modern-day view of a tea plantation at Mlanje

The major action of the Chilembwe uprising involved an attack on the Bruce plantation at Magomero. The plantation spanned about 5,000 acres (20 km^{2}) and grew both cotton and tobacco. Around 5,000 locals worked on it as part of their thangata obligations. The plantation had a reputation locally for the poor treatment of its workers and for the brutality of its managers, who closed local schools, beat their workers and paid them less than had been promised. Their burning of Chilembwe's church in November 1913 created a personal animosity with the rebel leadership. The insurgents launched two roughly concurrent attacks—one group targeted Magomero, the plantation headquarters and home of the main manager William Jervis Livingstone and a few other white staff, while a second assaulted the plantation-owned village of Mwanje, where there were two white households.

The rebels moved into Magomero in the early evening, while Livingstone and his wife were entertaining some dinner guests. The estate official, Duncan MacCormick, was in another house nearby. A third building, occupied by Emily Stanton, Alyce Roach and five children, contained a small cache of weapons and ammunition belonging to the local rifle club. The insurgents quietly broke into the Livingstone's house and injured him during hand-to-hand fighting, prompting him to take refuge in the bedroom, where his wife attempted to treat his wounds. The rebels forced their way into the bedroom, and after capturing his wife, decapitated Livingstone. MacCormick, who had been alerted, was killed by a rebel spear. The attackers took the women and children of the village prisoner but shortly released them unhurt, having reportedly treated them well. It has been suggested that Chilembwe may have hoped to use the women and children as hostages, but this remains unclear. The attack on Magomero, and in particular the killing of Livingstone, had great symbolic significance for Chilembwe's men. The two Mauser rifles captured from the plantation formed the basis of the rebel armoury for the rest of the uprising.

Mwanje had little military value but it has been proposed that the rebels may have hoped to find weapons and ammunition there. Led by Jonathan Chigwinya, the insurgents stormed one of the houses and killed the plantation's stock manager, Robert Ferguson, with a spear as he lay in bed reading a newspaper. Two of the colonists, John Robertson and his wife Charlotte, escaped into the cotton fields and walked 6 miles (9.7 km) to a neighbouring plantation to raise the alarm. One of the Robertsons' African servants, who remained loyal, was killed by the attackers.

=== Later actions ===
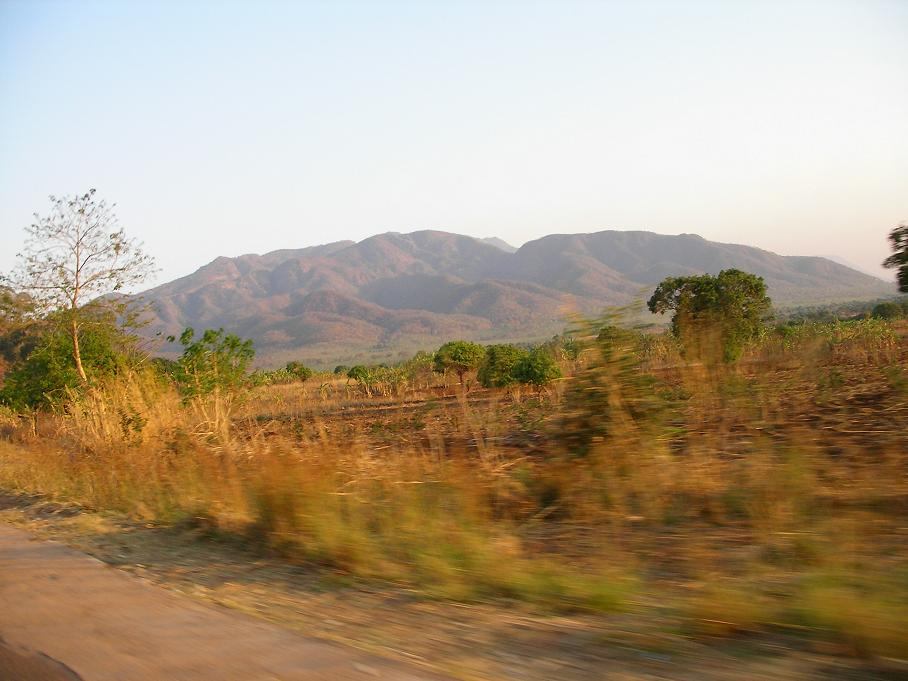
A modern view of the Shire Highlands

The rebels cut the Zomba–Tete and Blantyre–Mikalongwe telephone lines, delaying the spread of the news. At around 02:00 on 24 January, the ALC weapons store in Blantyre was attacked by a force of around 100 rebels before the general alarm had been raised by news of the Magomero and Mwanje attacks. Local settlers mobilised after an African watchman was shot dead by the rebels. The rebels were repulsed, but not before they had captured five rifles and some ammunition, which were taken back to Mbombwe. A number of rebels were taken prisoner during the retreat from Magomero.

After the initial attacks on the Bruce plantation, the rebels returned home. Livingstone's head was taken back and displayed at the Providence Industrial Mission on the second day of the uprising as Chilembwe preached a sermon. During much of the rebellion, Chilembwe remained in Mbombwe praying and leadership of the rebels was taken by David Kaduya, a former King's African Rifles (KAR) soldier. Under Kaduya's command, the rebels successfully ambushed a small party of KAR troops near Mbombwe on 24 January, described as the "one reverse suffered by the government" during the uprising.

By the morning of 24 January the colonial government had mustered the Nyasaland Volunteer Reserve (NVR), a unit that consisted of settler reservists, and redeployed the 1st Battalion of the KAR from the north of the colony. The rebels did not further attack any of the many other isolated plantations in the region. They also did not occupy the boma (fort) at Chiradzulu just 5 miles (8.0 km) from Mbombwe, even though it was ungarrisoned at the time. Rumours of rebel attacks spread, but despite earlier offers of support, there were no parallel uprisings elsewhere in Nyasaland and the promised reinforcements from Ncheu did not materialise. The Mlanje or Zomba regions likewise refused to join the uprising.

=== Siege of Mbombwe and attempted escape ===
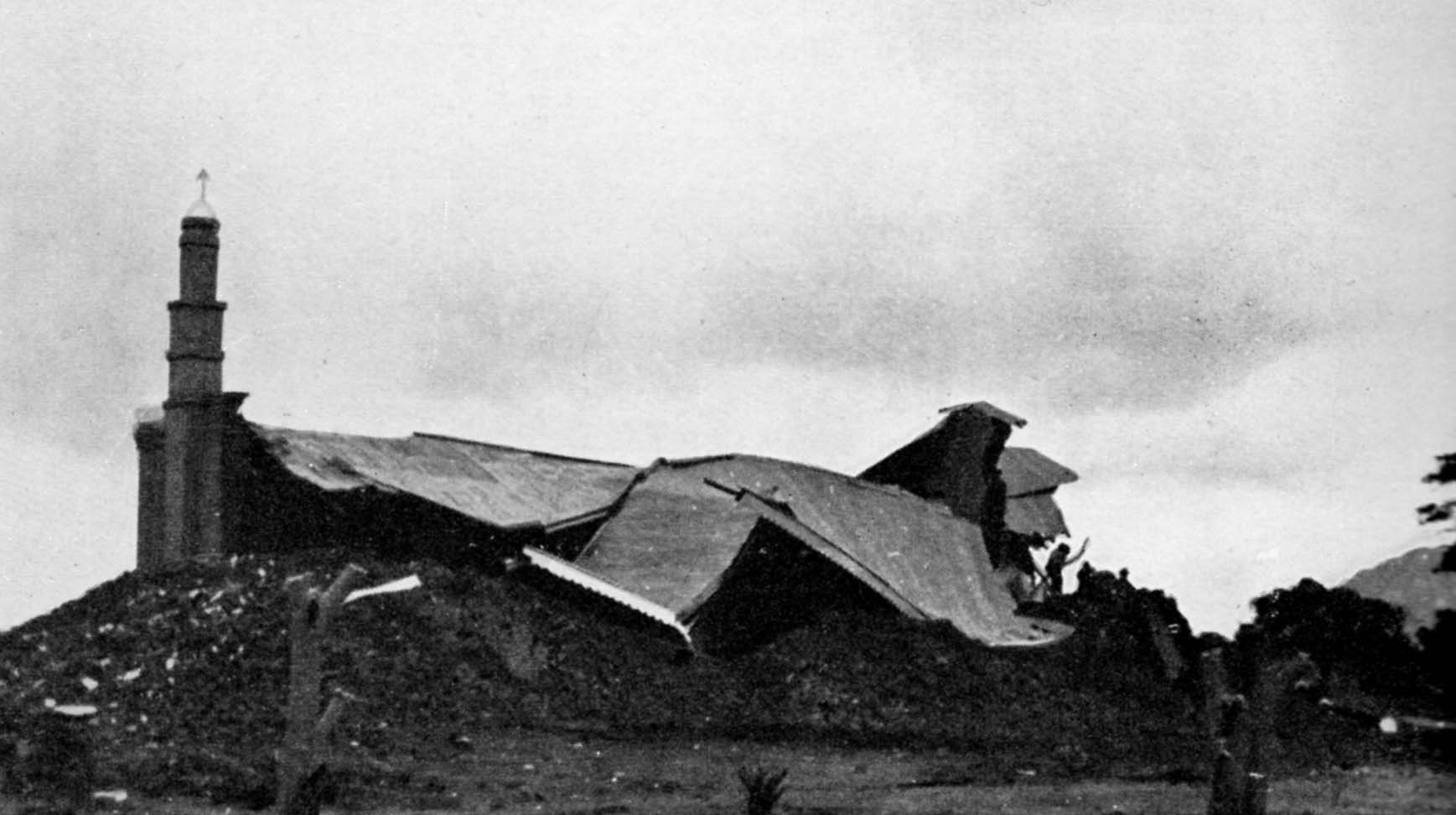
View of the Providence Industrial Mission shortly after its destruction by government troops

KAR troops launched a tentative attack on Mbombwe on 25 January but the engagement proved inconclusive. Chilembwe's forces held a strong defensive position along the Mbombwe river and could not be pushed back. Two KAR soldiers were killed and three were wounded; Chilembwe's losses have been estimated as about 20.

On 26 January, a group of rebels attacked a Catholic mission at Nguludi belonging to Father Swelsen. The mission was defended by four African armed guards, one of whom was killed; Father Swelsen was also wounded in the fighting and the church was burnt down, resulting in the death of a young girl who was inside at the time. KAR and NVR troops assaulted Mbombwe again the same day but encountered no resistance. Many rebels, including Chilembwe, had fled the village disguised as civilians. Mbombwe's fall and the subsequent demolition of Chilembwe's church with dynamite by government soldiers ended the rebellion. Kaduya was captured and brought back to Magomero where he was publicly executed. This was the final attack of the rebellion, and Morris attributed the decision to attack the Catholic mission to "the pervasive anti-Catholic sentiments expressed by the independent Baptists".

Following the attacks, Chilembwe meditated on the summit of Chilimankhanje hill instead of attempting to regroup the now dispersed rebel troops. He was eventually convinced to leave the hill and escape to Mozambique, a land that he had already been to numerous times during his hunting trips. Chilembwe also wrote a letter to the German colonial authorities in Tunduru, asking for aid. He never received a response, and the letter was considered an embarrassment to his supporters, given Germany's reputation as a particularly oppressive colonial power.

After the defeat of the rebellion, most of the remaining insurgents attempted to escape eastwards across the Shire Highlands, towards Portuguese East Africa, from where they hoped to head north to German-controlled territory. Chilembwe was spotted by a Nyasaland Police patrol and shot dead on 3 February near Mlanje. Many other rebels were captured; 300 were imprisoned following the rebellion and 40 were executed. Around 30 rebels evaded capture and settled in Portuguese territory near the Nyasaland border.

== Aftermath ==
The colonial authorities responded quickly to the uprising with as much force and as many troops, policemen and settler volunteers it could muster to hunt down and kill suspected rebels. There was no official death toll, but perhaps 50 of Chilembwe's followers were killed in the fighting, when trying to escape after or summarily executed. Worrying that the rebellion might rapidly reignite and spread, the authorities instigated arbitrary reprisals against the local African population, including mass hut burnings. All weapons were confiscated and fines of 4 shillings per person were levied in the districts affected by the revolt, regardless of whether the people in question had been involved. As part of the repression, a series of courts were hastily convened which passed death sentences on forty-six men for the offences of murder and treason and 300 others were given prison sentences. Thirty-six were executed and, to increase the deterrent effect, some of the ringleaders were hanged in public on a main road close to the Magomero Estate where Europeans had been killed.

The colonial government also began restricting the rights of Christian missionaries in Nyasaland and, although Anglican missions, those of the Scottish churches and Catholic missions were not affected, it banned many smaller, often American-originated churches, including the Churches of Christ and Watchtower Society, from Nyasaland, and placed restrictions on other African-run churches. Public gatherings, especially those associated with African-initiated religious groups, were banned until 1919. Fear of similar uprisings in other British colonies, notably Northern Rhodesia, also led to similar repression of independent churches and foreign missions beyond Nyasaland.

Though the rebellion failed, the threat to British rule posed by the revolt compelled the colonial government to introduce some reform. The authorities proposed to undermine the power of independent churches like Chilembwe's by promoting secular education, but a lack of funding made this impossible. Colonial officials in Nyasaland began to promote tribal loyalties through the system of indirect rule, which was expanded after the revolt. In particular, the Muslim Yao people, who attempted to distance themselves from Chilembwe, were given more power and autonomy. Although delayed by the war, the Nyasaland Police, which had been primarily composed of Africans conscripted by colonial officials, was restructured as a professional force of white settlers. Forced labour was retained, and would remain a source of resentment among Africans for decades afterwards.

While the uprising enjoyed levels of sympathy amongst Yao commoners, none of the Yao chiefs in the Shire Highlands supported it. Most of them embraced Islam instead of Christianity and considered African planters a threat to their political hegemony. The Commission of Enquiry dismissed the uprising as a localised affair caused by the harsh mistreatment of Africans by the Magomero estate. However, the grievances expressed by Chilembwe were not unique to his area, and Africans across Nyasaland identified with his struggle. Africans had no rights as tenants under the thangata system, had to pay rent in labour and were prohibited from gathering wood or hunting wild animals in the woodlands surrounding European estates, even though they considered woodland resources to be common property. Historians have noted that while the colonial authorities did suppress slave trading in Nyasaland, the thangata system was seen by many Africans as a new form of slavery.

The rebels were of diverse social and economic backgrounds, consisting of Yao people, Lomwe immigrants, agricultural farmers and African petty bourgeoisie. The colonial authorities ignored African petitions and failed to translate their laws into local languages, leading to many locals not understanding them at all. Morris noted that Africans of Nyasaland were becoming increasingly hostile to colonial rule due to mistreatment they experienced on white-owned plantations, and if the rebels had managed to acquire German support and acquire weapon caches during the attack on the ALC weapons store in Blantyre, it could have turned into "a wider and more protracted struggle". Morris concludes that the rebellion was a response to colonial oppression, particularly towards racial injustice. It was a "struggle for freedom" with elements of Christian utopianism, with Chilembwe expressing two contrasting political traditions - Booth's radical egalitarianism and a "petty capitalist orientation" of the Protestant churches, which stressed the right to private property, wage labour and commercial agriculture.

=== Commission of Enquiry ===
In the aftermath of the revolt, the colonial administration formed a Commission of Enquiry to examine the causes and handling of the rebellion. The Commission, which presented its conclusions in early 1916, found that the revolt was chiefly caused by mismanagement of the Bruce plantation. The Commission also blamed Livingstone himself for "treatment of natives [that was] often unduly harsh" and for poor management of the estate. The Commission found that the systematic discrimination, lack of freedoms and respect were key causes of resentment among the local population. It also emphasised the effect of Booth's ideology on Chilembwe.

The Commission's reforms were not far-reaching—though it criticised the thangata system, it made only minor changes aimed at ending "casual brutality". Though the government passed laws banning plantation owners from using the services of their tenants as payment of rent in 1917, effectively abolishing thangata, it was "uniformly ignored". A further Commission in 1920 concluded that the thangata could not be effectively abolished, and it remained a constant source of friction into the 1950s.

== In later culture ==
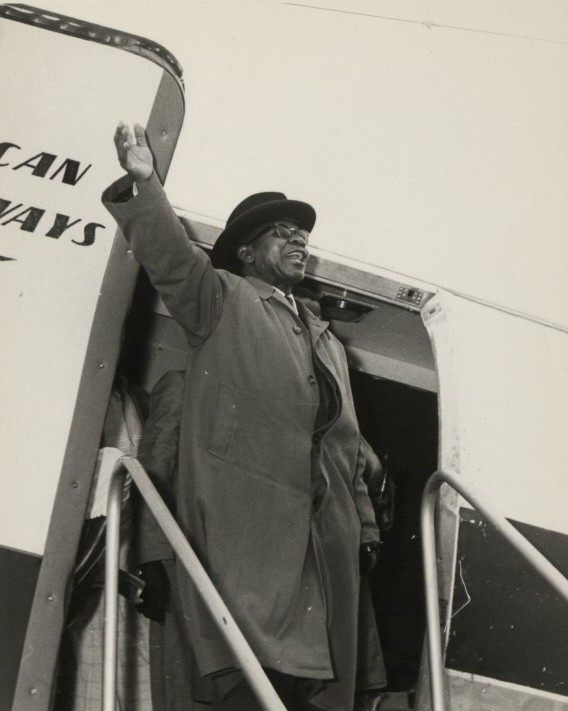
Hastings Banda, Malawi's independence leader, championed Chilembwe's legacy in the 1960s

Despite its failure, the Chilembwe uprising has since gained an important place in the modern Malawian cultural memory, with Chilembwe himself gaining "iconic status". The uprising had "local notoriety" in the years immediately after it, and former rebels were kept under police observation. Over the next three decades, local anti-colonial activists idealised Chilembwe and began to see him as a semi-mythical figure. The Nyasaland African Congress (NAC) of the 1940s and 1950s used him as a symbolic figurehead, partly because its president, James Chinyama, had a family connection to Filipo Chinyama, who had been believed to be an ally of Chilembwe's. When the NAC announced that it intended to mark 15 February annually as Chilembwe Day, colonial officials were scandalised. One wrote that to "venerate the memory of the fanatic and blood thirsty Chilembwe seems to us to be nothing less than a confession of violent intention."

Historian Desmond Dudwa Phiri characterised Chilembwe's uprising as an early expression of Malawian nationalism, as did George Shepperson and Thomas Price in their 1958 book Independent African, an exhaustive study of Chilembwe and his rebellion that was banned during the colonial era but still widely read by Nyasaland's educated class. Chilembwe became viewed as an "unproblematic" hero by many of the country's people. The Malawi Congress Party, which ultimately led the country to independence in 1964, made a conscious effort to identify its leader Hastings Banda with Chilembwe through speeches and radio broadcasts. Bakili Muluzi, who succeeded Banda in 1994, similarly invoked Chilembwe's memory to win popular support, inaugurating a new annual national holiday, Chilembwe Day, on 16 January 1995. Chilembwe's portrait was soon added to the national currency, the kwacha, and reproduced on Malawian stamps. It has been argued that for Malawian politicians, Chilembwe has become "symbol, legitimising myth, instrument and propaganda".

== Historical analysis ==
The revolt has been the subject of much research and has been interpreted in various ways by historians. At the time, the uprising was generally considered to mark a turning point in British colonial rule. The governor of Nyasaland, George Smith, declared that the revolt marked a "new phase in the existence of Nyasaland". According to historian Hew Strachan, the Chilembwe uprising tarnished British prestige in East Africa which contributed, after the appointment of the future Prime Minister Bonar Law as Secretary of State for the Colonies, to renewed pressure for an Anglo-Belgian offensive against German East Africa.

Chilembwe's aims have also come under scrutiny. According to Robert I. Rotberg, Chilembwe's speech of 23 January appeared to stress the importance and inevitability of martyrdom as a principal motivation. The same speech depicted the uprising as a manifestation of desperation but because of his desire to "strike a blow and die", he did not have any idea of what he would replace colonialism with if the revolt succeeded. Rotberg concludes that Chilembwe planned to seize power in the Shire Highlands or perhaps in all of Nyasaland. John McCracken attacks the idea that the revolt could be considered nationalist, arguing that Chilembwe's ideology was instead fundamentally utopian and created in opposition to localised abuses of the colonial system, particularly thangata. According to McCracken, the uprising failed because Chilembwe was over-reliant on a small Europeanised petite bourgeoisie and did not gain enough mass support. Rotberg's examination the Chilembwe revolt from a psychoanalytical perspective concludes that Chilembwe's personal situation, his psychosomatic asthma and financial debt may have been contributory factors in his decision to plot the rebellion.

== See also ==
- Bussa rebellion—A 1915 uprising against British indirect rule in northern Nigeria
- Chimurenga—A rebellion against the British South Africa Company administration in nearby Southern Rhodesia in 1896–97
- History of Malawi
- Maji Maji Rebellion—A war against German colonial rule in East Africa, 1905–08
