= Livingstone Bruce Plantation Raid =

Raid during the Chilembwe uprising

- Part of The Chilembwe uprising during The Great War
Date	23 January 1915
Location	Livingstone Bruce Plantation, Nyasaland
Result	Rebel Victory

Belligerents
(United Kingdom) British Empire: Nyasaland	Rebels

Commanders and leaders
(Nyasaland) William Jervis Livingstone †	John Chilembwe

Strength
Unknown	Unknown

Casualties and losses
4 killed	None

The Livingstone Bruce Plantation Raid was an attack on the European owned and run cotton and tobacco plantation, which was situated at Magomero. The attack on the plantation was only major action of the ill fated Chilembwe uprising.

== Background ==
The Livingstone Bruce Plantation was situated at Magomero. The plantation spanned about 5,000 acres (2,000 ha) and grew both cotton and tobacco. Around 5,000 local Africans worked on it as part of their thangata obligations. The plantation had a reputation locally for the poor treatment of its workers and for the brutality of its managers, who closed local schools, beat their workers and paid them less than had been promised.

At the time Magomero was acquired, it was largely unoccupied and uncultivated, and it was necessary to find a suitable crop and workers. Between 1895 and 1925, the company had tried growing coffee, cotton and flue-cured tobacco: they all failed. Instead of local people, workers at Magomero were generally "Anguru", a term employed by Europeans to describe as a number of different Lomwe speaking migrants from the parts of Mozambique east of the Shire Highlands. These Lomwe were welcomed at Magomero as tenants, and initially the men had no obligation to work in lieu of rent for their first two years, and after this for only one month a year: single women were exempt. By 1915, Lomwe migrants made up almost half the 4,926 hut owners at Magomero.

Arabica coffee was the first estate crop grown in much of the Shire Highlands, and was quite widely planted in the 1890s, until a world-wide collapse in coffee prices in 1903. About 200 to 300 acres of coffee bushes were planted at Magomero from 1895, but after poor crops in 1898 and 1899, the management looked for a more suitable crop. Following the collapse of coffee prices, the Shire Highlands estates next turned to cotton from 1903. Growing Egyptian cotton in the Shire Highlands was at first unsuccessful: it was more suitable for the hotter Shire Valley. However, from 1906, W. J. Livingstone developed a hardier variety of Upland cotton called Nyasaland Upland, and by 1908 had planted 1,000 acres at Magomero, increased to 5,000 acres by 1914. Cotton required intensive labour over a long growing period, and this resulted increasing labour demands on the tenants.

=== Thangata ===
In order to ensure that 3,000 to 5,000 workers were available throughout the five to six month long growing season of cotton, the obligations of labour tenants were exploited, wages were withheld or underpaid and violent coercion was used. The term "thangata" was used to describe these labour obligations. The word originally meant help, as in the reciprocal help that neighbours might give each other, but came to mean the amount of labour that a tenant on a European-owned estate has to give in return for their tenancy. Additional labour services were also required in lieu of Hut tax which the owned paid on behalf of tenants. Alexander Livingstone Bruce was said to have pioneered the thangata system, and even if others had led the way, his manager, W. J. Livingstone, exploited it rigorously once the Magomero estate started to grow cotton . Although W. J. Livingstone was manager, Alexander Livingstone Bruce lived in Nyasaland and had control of the estate operations. On the Bruce estates, the total obligations could amount to four or five months a year, much of this in the growing season, leaving tenants with little time to grow their own food. Single women tenants were now required to provide labour. Tenancies were based on verbal contracts, and tenants had little or no chance to dispute the owners’ interpretations of them.

=== Local Resentment ===
Their burning of Chilembwe's church in November 1913 created a personal animosity with the rebel leadership. The insurgents launched two roughly concurrent attacks—one group targeted Magomero, the plantation headquarters and home of the main manager William Jervis Livingstone and a few other white staff, while a second assaulted the plantation-owned village of Mwanje, where there were two white households.

== The Raid ==
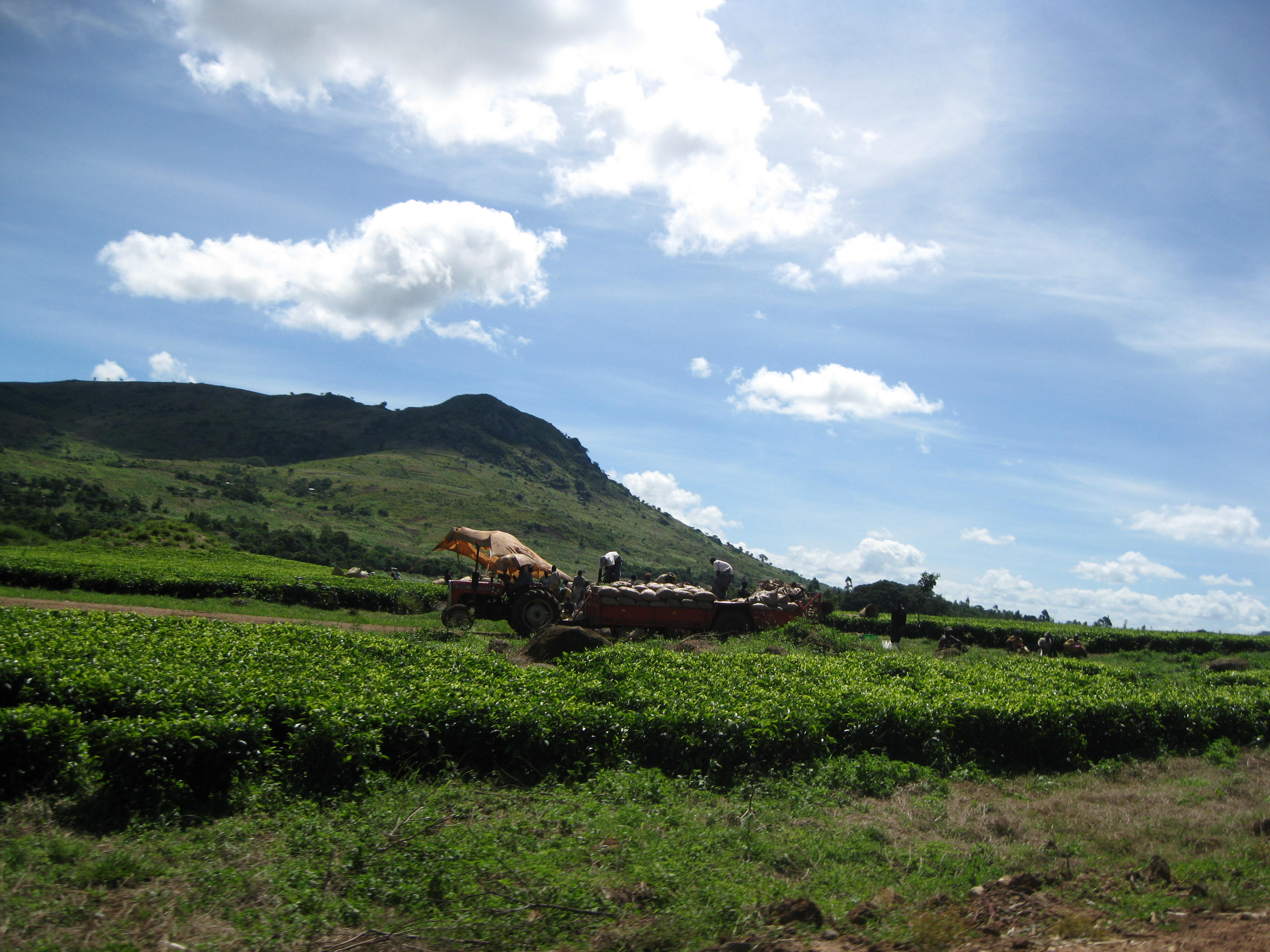
Modern-day view of a tea plantation at Mlanje

The rebels moved into Magomero in the early evening, while Livingstone and his wife were entertaining some dinner guests. The estate official, Duncan MacCormick, was in another house nearby. A third building, occupied by Emily Stanton, Alyce Roach and five children, contained a small cache of weapons and ammunition belonging to the local rifle club. The insurgents quietly broke into the Livingstone's house and injured him during hand-to-hand fighting, prompting him to take refuge in the bedroom, where his wife attempted to treat his wounds. The rebels forced their way into the bedroom, and after capturing his wife, decapitated Livingstone. MacCormick, who had been alerted, was killed by a rebel spear. The attackers took the women and children of the village prisoner but shortly released them unhurt, having reportedly treated them well. It has been suggested that Chilembwe may have hoped to use the women and children as hostages, but this remains unclear. Mwanje had little military value but it has been proposed that the rebels may have hoped to find weapons and ammunition there. Led by Jonathan Chigwinya, the insurgents stormed one of the houses and killed the plantation's stock manager, Robert Ferguson, with a spear as he lay in bed reading a newspaper. Two of the colonists, John Robertson and his wife Charlotte, escaped into the cotton fields and walked 6 miles (9.7 km) to a neighbouring plantation to raise the alarm. One of the Robertsons' African servants, who remained loyal, was killed by the attackers.

== Aftermath ==
The attack on Magomero, and in particular the killing of Livingstone, had great symbolic significance for Chilembwe's men. The two Mauser rifles captured from the plantation formed the basis of the rebel armoury for the rest of the uprising.
