= Blantyre raid =

1915 attack on the African Lakes Company

Blantyre Raid
- Part of The Chilembwe uprising during The Great War
- Blantyre raid (Malawi)
Date	24 January 1915
Location	Blantyre, Nyasaland
Result	Nyasan victory: Rebels fail to capture supply depot

Belligerents
British Empire: Nyasaland; African Lakes Company	Rebels

Commanders and leaders
(Nyasaland) Unknown	John Chilembwe

Strength
Unknown	100 rebels

Casualties and losses
1+ killed 5 rifles+ammunition captured	Unknown number killed 5 captured

The Blantyre Raid was an attack carried out by the rebel leader John Chilembwe and his followers on the African Lakes Company depot in Blantyre on 24 February 1915. The rebels failed to capture the depot, although they were able to seize a small number of rifles from the depot.

== Background ==
The rebels cut the Zomba–Tete and Blantyre–Mikalongwe telephone lines, delaying the spread of the news of their revolt to the government and Governor of Nyasaland.

== The Raid ==
The African Lakes' Company weapons store in Blantyre was raided by a force of around 100 rebels at around 02:00pm on 24 January, before the general alarm had been raised by news of the Magomero and Mwanje attacks. The defenders mobilised after an African watchman was shot dead by the rebels. The insurgents were repulsed, but not before they had captured five rifles and some ammunition, which was taken back to Mbombwe.

A number of rebels were taken prisoner during the retreat from Magomero.

== Bibliography ==
- McCracken, John (2012). A History of Malawi, 1859–1966. Woodbridge: James Currey. ISBN 978-1-84701-064-3.
- Rotberg, R. I. (1971). "Psychological Stress and the Question of Identity: Chilembwe's Revolt Reconsidered". In Rotberg, R. I.; Mazrui, A. A. (eds.). Protest and Power in Black Africa. New York. pp. 133–64. OCLC 139250.
- Shepperson, George; Price, Thomas (1958). Independent African: John Chilembwe and the Origins, Setting and Significance of the Nyasaland Native Rising of 1915. Edinburgh: Edinburgh University Press. OCLC 421086.
