= William Jervis Livingstone =

Scottish planter in Africa

William Jervis Livingstone (1865–1915) was the manager of the Magomero Estate in Nyasaland (present-day Malawi) owned by A L Bruce Estates Ltd and was killed in 1915 during the uprising against colonial rule led by John Chilembwe. Livingstone, from the Isle of Lismore in Argyllshire, Scotland, was born in 1865 and appointed as manager of Magomero in 1893.

Although he experimented with growing coffee and later cotton, the estate was not a financial success and Livingstone imposed increasingly harsh labour demands on the estate workers there. He was also accused of the brutal mistreatment of those workers. Although Livingstone was immediately responsible for imposing excessive work demands on the workers and their brutal treatment, they were the results of the pressures for financial success that were imposed by Alexander Livingstone Bruce, a director and 40% shareholder in A L Bruce Estates Ltd after he came to live in Nyasaland from 1908. Bruce considered independent African churches to be subversive, and instructed Livingstone to destroy the church buildings that John Chilembwe had constructed without Bruce's permission on the Magomero estate.

Chilembwe's grievances about colonial rule and the oppression of African estate workers came to focus on William Jervis Livingstone and, when he initiated his revolt on 23 January 1915, Chilembwe ordered some of his men to attack the A L Bruce Estates, to kill all European men and to return with Livingstone's head. Livingstone and three others, including Duncan MacCormick also from Lismore and an African servant, were killed at Magomero, but the women and children were left unharmed on Chilembwe's instructions. In the aftermath of the uprising, Livingstone was blamed for the harsh and unsatisfactory conditions on the A L Bruce Estates, whereas Alexander Livingstone Bruce escaped censure. More recently, William Livingstone's character has been re-examined and, although undoubtedly a violent man, he is also regarded as reacting to the demands made by Alexander Livingstone Bruce which he found impossible to meet.

== Birth and family ==
William Jervis Livingstone was born on 8 March 1865 at Bachuil, Isle of Lismore, Argyllshire, in Scotland. His father, Alexander Livingstone (1815-1906), was a Baptist minister and his mother Jessie (née McPherson, 1824–99) was Alexander’s second wife. Alexander Livingstone had seven children, of whom three died as infants and two, including William’s older half-brother, in their twenties. Only William and his younger brother Thomas survived into the 20th century. In 1908, William married Katherine (née MacLachlan), a schoolteacher, and they had three children, one of whom died as an infant.

Both Alexander Livingstone and later his son William claimed the title of Baron of Bachuil, although this dignity was not formally recognised until 2004, and it did not imply ownership of any land. William Jervis Livingstone considered that he was related to David Livingstone, but no direct connection has been proven, particularly in view of the uncertainty about the identity of David Livingstone's grandparents and more remote ancestors.

It has been claimed that David Livingstone’s daughter Agnes called on William Jervis Livingstone to manage the Magomero Estate after the death of her husband, Alexander Low Bruce, on account of this relationship. However, it is more probable that Alexander Low Bruce made the appointment shortly before his death. Livingstone was 28 years old when he was appointed to manage Magomero and 49 years old when he was killed there on 23 January 1915: most of what is known of him concerns his 21 years as manager of that estate.

== Magomero ==
=== Origin ===
Agnes (b. 1847), the daughter of David Livingstone married Alexander Low Bruce (b. 1839) in 1875. They had four children including two sons, David Livingstone Bruce (b. 1877) and Alexander Livingstone Bruce (b. 1881). Alexander Low Bruce was a master brewer who supported African commercial and missionary organisations and, after his marriage to Agnes Livingstone, he became a director of the African Lakes Company. He never visited Nyasaland, but obtained title to some 170,000 acres of land there through his association with the African Lakes Company and the agency of John Buchanan, a planter who also brokered land sales by local chiefs. Of this land, 162,000 acres formed the estate that he named Magomero, after a village that David Livingstone had recorded in the same area during his Zambezi expedition. Magomero is situated south of Zomba. On Alexander Low Bruce's death in 1893 aged 54, title to his African assets passed under his will to the A L Bruce Trust, whose main beneficiaries were his two sons, then aged 16 and 12.

Shortly before his death, Alexander Low Bruce had appointed a manager for each of his two estates in Nyasaland. William Jervis Livingstone took control of the main estate of Magomero in Chiradzulu District in 1893 and D.B. Ritchie was placed in charge of the smaller Likulezi Estate near Mlanje. Initially, Agnes assumed oversight of the A L Bruce Trust until Bruce's heirs, David and Alexander, could take over when they came of age. The provisions of their father's will expected them to run the estates:

"…not on account of any pecuniary advantage…but in the hope and expectation that they will take an interest in the opening up of Africa to Christianity and Commerce on the lines laid down by their grandfather the late David Livingstone."

However, after their mother’s death, and as the Magomero estate showed potential, David Livingstone Bruce and Alexander Livingstone Bruce purchased the assets of the A L Bruce Trust in 1913, paying just over £41,000 for its two estates. They then incorporated A L Bruce Estates Ltd in 1913 as a commercial venture with a share capital of £54,000, largely held by the two sons and one of the daughters of Alexander Low Bruce.

=== Crops grown ===
When Magomero was acquired, it was largely unoccupied and uncultivated, and William Jervis Livingstone needed to find suitable crops and workers. At first, he tried unsuccessfully to grow coffee, then turned first to cotton and later to tobacco. Most workers at Magomero were not local people but rather migrants from Mozambique belonging to a number of different Lomwe-speaking groups (so-called "Anguru"). These Lomwe workers came to Magomero as tenants; initially the men had to work for one month a year in lieu of rent: widows and single women were exempt. Livingstone ordered the planting of about 70,000 bushes of Arabica coffee in 200 to 300 acres as the first estate crop at Magomero in 1895, but after poor crops in 1898 and 1899 because of frost and a collapse in world coffee prices in 1903, he looked for more profitable crops.

Livingstone turned to cotton from 1903: growing Egyptian cotton was unsuccessful as it was more suitable for hotter areas, but from 1906, he developed a hardier variety of Upland cotton called Nyasaland Upland, and in 1908 planted 1,000 acres at Magomero with it; this was increased to 5,000 acres by 1914. Cotton required intensive labour over a long growing period, and Livingstone ensured that 3,000 to 5,000 workers were available throughout its five or six month growing season by exploiting the obligations of the labour tenancy system called thangata. This word originally meant help, such as one neighbour might give another, but it came to mean the work that a tenant on a European-owned estate had to undertake in lieu of rent. Tenants were also required to undertake additional work on account of the hut tax which the owner paid on behalf of tenants. Other men worked for wages: they were often unpaid, underpaid or given tobacco instead of cash, and violently coerced by the owners. Although William Jervis Livingstone pioneered the thangata system at Magomero from 1906, once Alexander Livingstone Bruce came to live in Nyasaland in 1908 and control of the estate operations, he instructed Livingstone, his manager, to exploit thangata rigorously to maximise the amount of cotton grown. The A L Bruce Estates increased the amount of labour demanded in account of rent and Hut tax to four or five months a year, mainly in the rainy season, which was also the main growing season for both cotton and food crops, leaving tenants little time to grow their own food. Single women tenants and widows were now also required to work.

=== Harsh management ===
One of the main reasons that William Jervis Livingstone was killed in the 1915 Chilembwe uprising was the severity of his management. Following the uprising, the protectorate government tried to replace thangata by cash rents. However, Alexander Livingstone Bruce, as a major planter, led estate owners in threatening massive evictions of tenants if this change were implemented, and thangata remained. Even after Livingstone’s killing, the work obligation on the A L Bruce Estates was little modified, sometimes amounting to six months for thangata and Hut tax. However, as the Crown lands nearest to the estates were already crowded, and as most of the estate tenants were Anguru, who had no claim to settle on those Crown lands, they had little option but to stay.

William Jervis Livingstone was quick-tempered and his actions, including arbitrarily increasing tenants’ workloads and ordering them to be beaten, concerned local district officials from the early years of the 20th century. The physical punishment of workers was fairly widespread in Nyasaland, but as early as 1901 Livingstone was fined for aggravated assault, and there was testimony from his fellow planters that he beat his estate workers and domestic staff with little provocation. However, against this, several headmen from the Bruce Estates confirmed that Livingstone had distributed food to them in times of famine. These headmen were often Muslim ex-soldiers appointed by him to control the mainly migrant estate workforce: there is no suggestion of any widespread food distribution to tenants.

Chilembwe’s Providence Industrial Mission was the closest mission settlement to Magomero, and it built schools and churches on the estate. Livingstone was justifiably accused of destroying them, but Chilembwe himself deliberately provoked confrontation by erecting churches on private estate land, knowing that the estate owner did not want them built there, and it is clear that Livingstone had to act under orders from Bruce. Unlike the often brutal, sometimes generous, William Jervis Livingstone, Bruce (who had absolute control over estate policy) had the consistent aim of making a profit from its operations. Bruce, whose view was that educated Africans had no place in colonial society and opposed African education, recorded his personal dislike for Chilembwe as an educated African. He considered Chilembwe's churches were centres for agitation, and that by building them on the estate, Chilembwe was making a claim to part of its land. As Livingstone carried out the work of destruction, he, rather than Bruce, became a focus for Chilembwe’s grievances resulting in his tragic demise.

== John Chilembwe ==
John Chilembwe (1871 – 1915) was a Baptist minister who attended a Church of Scotland mission around 1890, and became a servant of the radical missionary Joseph Booth, in 1892. Booth was a Baptist minister until 1898, when he became a convinced Sabbatarian and in 1897 he left Nyasaland accompanied by Chilembwe, whom he took to be educated at the Virginia Theological Seminary and College, (now Virginia University of Lynchburg). Chilembwe was ordained as a Baptist minister at Lynchburg in 1899 and returned to Nyasaland in 1900. Chilembwe started his Providence Industrial Mission in Chiradzulu district: in its first decade, it developed gradually, helped by donations from his American backers, and it founded several churches and schools. Initially, Chilembwe avoided any criticism of actions or views that the colonial authorities might think were subversive, but by 1913, he had become more politically militant and openly criticised the government over African land rights and the conditions of tenants, particularly those on the Magomero estate, where many of his mission congregation worked.

In his first decade in Nyasaland after returning from Lynchburg, Virginia, Chilembwe had reasonable success. After 1910 his mission faced rising debt as support from its American backers dried up. His personal life was clouded by the death of a daughter and his own worsening health including asthma attacks and declining eyesight. These problems increased Chilembwe's bitterness toward Europeans in Nyasaland, and moved him towards thoughts of revolt. However, the outbreak and effects of the First World War was the key factor in moving him from merely thinking to planning action, which he believed would lead to the deliverance of the African people of Nyasaland.

Following a battle at Karonga in September 1914, Chilembwe wrote an impassioned letter to the "Nyasaland Times" newspaper, saying some of his countrymen, "have already shed their blood", others were being "crippled for life" and were "invited to die for a cause which is not theirs". By December 1914, Chilembwe was regarded with suspicion by the colonial authorities and the Governor decided to deport him and some of his followers. The war-time censor had stopped publication of Chilembwe’s letter. This, and the possibility that he learned of his intended deportation, prompted Chilembwe to bring forward the timing of his revolt, which made its success more unlikely. Chilembwe gathered a small group of mission-educated Africans as his lieutenants, and in December 1914 and early January 1915, planned to attack British rule in Nyasaland.

The aims of the rising remain unclear, as Chilembwe and most of his leading supporters were killed in the uprising or later executed, and as many relevant documents in Nyasaland were destroyed in an archive fire in 1919. However, his use of the theme of “Africa for the Africans” suggests a political motive rather than a purely religious one. Chilembwe is said to have likened his rising to that of John Brown, and stated his wish to "strike a blow and die". His plan involved, firstly an attack on government centres in the Shire Highlands on the night of the 23rd to the 24th of January 1915 to obtain arms and ammunition and, secondly, to attack European estates in that area during the same night. These two parts relied on a force of about 200 men, mainly from Chilembwe's congregations or other independent African churches in the area. Chilembwe also expected there to be simultaneous uprising planned for the Ncheu District which was outside his control and for its participants to move south and link up with Chilembwe’s force. The Ncheu rising was abortive and the first part of Chilembwe's plan failed almost completely: not all the planned attacks were carried out, so few arms were obtained.

== The killing of William Jervis Livingstone ==
On Saturday 23 January, Chilembwe claimed to have received information that the Europeans would begin killing all Africans on 25 January. He gathered his followers in Mbomwe church, the first he had built after his return from the United States, to give them final instructions for the rising. He did not accompany his men on their attacks, but divided them into several groups with different tasks. Two groups were sent north to attack the A L Bruce Estates with orders to kill all European men and bring back the head of William Jervis Livingstone, but not to harm any women. Most of the remaining men were to head south towards Blantyre, the commercial centre of the protectorate.

One of the two groups sent north led by Wilson Zimba was to attack the headquarters of the Magomero estate, which also stored rifles for part of the Nyasaland Volunteer Reserve. The other group under Jonathon Chigwinya was to attack the Mwanje plantation, a part of the Magomero estate some distance from the headquarters. There would normally have been three European men at Magomero, William Jervis Livingstone, his assistant Duncan MacCormick (also from the Isle of Lismore) and J T Roach, the Australian estate engineer, but that night Roach was absent. There were also four European women and five children there. Zimba’s men surrounded Livingstone’s house and waited until the family retired for the night at around 9 pm, when several of them broke in, attacked Livingstone with spears and severely wounded him while he attempted to defend himself, using his rifle as a club. He was apparently still alive when he was decapitated with an axe in front of his wife and two small children in their family bedroom. Duncan MacCormick lived alone in a small cottage a few hundred yards from Livingstone's main estate house. His cottage was not surrounded before the attack on Livingstone, but when MacCormick became aware of the commotion, he ran to investigate without arming himself with his rifle and was speared to death. Roach’s house was attacked after the deaths of Livingstone and MacCormick. When he was found to be absent, two rifles and ammunition he kept there were taken. The whole attack on the estate headquarters was over by 9.30 pm.

Meanwhile, the Mwanje plantation had been attacked around 8 pm. One of the two European men and his servant were speared to death, but the other European fought off his attackers with rifle fire. Two other Africans were killed by the groups sent south, and a European-run mission was set on fire and one of its missionaries was severely wounded. On Sunday 24 January, Chilembwe conducted a service at Mbomwe church next to a pole impaling Livingstone's head, but by 26 January he realised that his uprising had failed. After avoiding early attempts to capture him and apparently trying to escape into Mozambique, he was tracked down and killed on 3 February.

William Livingstone's wife, Kitty Livingstone, witnessed her husband's attack and beheading at close quarters. Her young daughter, Nyasa, was also a witness to the killing of her father in the family bedroom. Kitty, with her daughter, baby son and the guests that had been staying at Magomero that night had to endure a forced march for three nights and days through the African bush until they were rescued unharmed by the Kings African Rifles.

== Reputation ==
Despite having the name Livingstone and a claim to a notable ancestry, William Jervis Livingstone had no money of his own and, as a mere employee, had an uncertain status among landowning planters. After his death, the 1916 Commission of Enquiry, including government officials and planters, found it convenient to attribute some blame for the Chilembwe revolt to him. His main failing was that he never made financial success of Magomero. However, A L Bruce Estates Ltd was under-capitalised and almost never made a profit except for a few boom years for tobacco after the First World War. His employers expected results and, although Livingstone may have acted reasonably in the early years of being manager at Magomero, once the estate turned to cotton planting, enforcing the heavy demands that cotton cultivation made on workers brought out his brutality. Unlike some landowner-planters, who made money and exercised their authority without having problems with the colonial authorities, Livingstone’s actions worried officials from early in the first decade of the 20th century. Livingstone was caught between the demands of his employers and being able to treat the African workers and tenants he supervised fairly and reasonably: his employers usually won. Although most attention had been given to Livingstone, Alexander Livingstone Bruce, who was a director and significant shareholder of A L Bruce Estates Ltd had charge of the company’s operations in Nyasaland from 1908. Bruce used Livingstone and other European employees to enforce his policies, and tacitly approved of their methods.

At the official enquiry into Chilembwe’s uprising held in June 1915, the planters blamed missionary activities, while European missionaries emphasised the dangers of the teaching and preaching of African-led churches like Chilembwe's. African members of European-led churches complained about the treatment of workers on estates. The official enquiry needed to find causes for the rising and it blamed Chilembwe for his mixture of political and religious teaching, but also blamed the unsatisfactory conditions on the Bruce Estates and the unduly harsh regime of William Jervis Livingstone. In this enquiry, the Resident at Chiradzulu told the Commission appointed to consider the revolt that the conditions imposed on the A L Bruce Estates were illegal and oppressive, including paying workers poorly or in kind (not in cash), demanding excessive labour from tenants or not recording the work they did, and whipping and beating both workers and tenants. The abuses were confirmed by Magomero workers and tenants questioned by the Commission in 1915.

Oral tales, not recorded until much later, include the widely reported and possibly mythical one that Livingstone used to beat corpses at funerals with his walking stick to make sure they were dead and not simply shamming. His wife, who had witnessed the attack on her husband and his beheading, defended him passionately, claiming he was charitable to the hungry and sick. Her defence is quite plausible: Livingstone was quick-tempered and may have been violent and kind at different times. However, his distribution of food may have been limited to the headmen appointed by him to control the estate workforce rather than general. Her defence was that Livingstone was good master, not a bad one as the commission claimed. The concept of the master-servant relationship was at the heart of colonial society, but this concept was precisely what Chilembwe was fighting with his schools and self-help schemes, and ultimately why Livingstone was killed.

== See also ==
- Clan MacLea
- A L Bruce Estates
- Thangata
- John Chilembwe

== Sources ==
- L. White, (1987). Magomero: Portrait of an African Village, Cambridge University Press. ISBN 0-521-32182-4
- Geni, William Jervis Livingstone. http://www.geni.com/people/Baron-William-Jervis-Livingstone/6000000000987913269
- N Livingstone of Bachuil, (2004) The MacLeas or Livingstone and their allodial Barony of the Bachuil http://www.baronage.co.uk/2006a/Bachuil.pdf
- Clan Livingstone website http://www.clanlivingstone.info/forum/viewtopic.php?f=5&t=1151&hilit=Nyasaland&start=70
- Livingstone Descendants
- Inventories
- J McCracken, (2012). A History of Malawi, 1859-1966, Woodbridge, James Currey. ISBN 978-1-84701-050-6
- L. White, (1984). 'Tribes' and the Aftermath of the Chilembwe Rising, African Affairs, Vol. 83, No. 333.
- R Tangri, (1971). Some New Aspects of the Nyasaland Native Rising of 1915, African Historical Studies, Vol. 4, No. 2.
- G. Shepperson and T. Price, (1958). Independent African. John Chilembwe and the Origins, Setting and Significance of the Nyasaland Native Rising of 1915. Edinburgh University Press.
- R. I. Rotberg, (1970). Psychological Stress and the Question of Identity: Chilembwe's Revolt Reconsidered, in R I. Rotberg and A. A. Mazrui, eds., Protest and Power in Black Africa, New York, Oxford University Press. ISBN 978-019-500093-1.
- R. I. Rotberg, (1965). The Rise of Nationalism in Central Africa: The Making of Malawi and Zambia, 1873-1964, Cambridge (Mass), Harvard University Press.
- G MacCormick, (2004). Duncan MacCormick, 1888 - 1915 Planter at the Magomero Estate, The Society of Malawi Journal, Vol. 57, No. 2.
