= Siege of Mbombwe =

1915 siege during the Chilembwe Uprising

- Part of the Chilembwe uprising in the African theatre of The Great War
- Siege of Mbombwe (Malawi)
Date	25–26 January 1915
Location	Mbombwe, Nyasaland
Result	British victory: Chilembwe revolt ended

Belligerents
(United Kingdom of Great Britain and Ireland) British Empire: Nyasaland	Rebels

Commanders and leaders
(United Kingdom of Great Britain and Ireland) Governor George Smith	John Chilembwe †; David Kaduya (executed)

Units involved
(British Empire) King's African Rifles	Unknown

Strength
Unknown	Unknown

Casualties and losses
2 killed 3 wounded	20+ killed

The siege of Mbombwe started on 25 January 1915 when soldiers of the Government of Nyasaland attacked the rebel capital of Mbombwe. The siege ended on the next day when troops from the King's African Rifles stormed the rebel capital after a fierce fight with the rebels.

== Background ==
For most of the rebellion, John Chilembwe remained in Mbombwe praying and leadership of the rebels was taken by David Kaduya, a former soldier in the King's African Rifles (KAR). It was an ambush executed by rebels upon a small party of government soldiers near Mbombwe on 24 January. The ambush has often described as the "one reverse suffered by the government" during the entire Chilembwe uprising.

== The Battle ==
After arriving outside Mbombwe the troops of the King's African Rifles launched an attack on rebel stronghold on 25 January, however the engagement proved inconclusive. Chilembwe's forces held a strong defensive position along the Mbombwe river and could not be pushed back. Two African British soldiers were killed and three were wounded; Chilembwe's losses have been estimated as about 20 killed and many more wounded.

On 26 January, a group of rebels attacked a Catholic mission at Nguludi belonging to Father Swelsen. The mission was defended by four African armed guards, one of whom was killed, Father Swelsen was also wounded in the fighting and the church was burnt down. The military attacked Mbombwe again on the same day but encountered no resistance from the rebels and as such they were easily able to capture the town.

== Aftermath ==
Many rebels, including Chilembwe, had fled the village disguised as civilians. Mbombwe's fall and the government troops' subsequent demolition of Chilembwe's church with dynamite ended the rebellion. Kaduya was captured and brought back to Magomero where he was publicly executed.

After the defeat of the rebellion, most of the remaining insurgents attempted to escape eastwards across the Shire Highlands, towards Portuguese East Africa, from where they hoped to head north to German territory. Chilembwe was seen by a patrol of Nyasaland police and shot dead on 3 February near Mlanje. Many other rebels were captured; 300 were imprisoned following the rebellion and 40 were executed. Around 30 rebels evaded capture and settled in Portuguese territory near the Nyasaland border.
