= George Smith (civil servant) =

British civil servant (1858–1938)

Sir George Smith KCMG
- Portrait by Walter Stoneman, 1919

Governor of Nyasaland
- In office 23 September 1913 – 12 April 1923
- Preceded by: William Manning (acting Governor)
- Succeeded by: Richard Sims Donkin Rankine (acting Governor)

Personal details
- Born: 8 March 1858
- Died: 14 June 1938 (aged 80) Addlestone, Surrey
- Spouse: Lucy McDuff Cargill
- Children: 3 daughters

Sir George Smith KCMG (8 March 1858 – 14 June 1938) was a British civil servant. He began his career in the War Office in 1878 but joined the office of the chief secretary of British Cyprus the following year. He was promoted to assistant chief secretary in 1883 and afterwards transferred to the crown colony of British Mauritius where he was acting receiver general and chief collector of customs from 1905 to 1909. He was colonial secretary of Mauritius from 1910 to 1913 when he was appointed governor of the protectorate of Nyasaland. He held this position for ten years which included the First World War and the Chilembwe uprising. Smith encountered difficulties in relations with the Ngoni people over the hut tax and had to deal with an influx of white ex-servicemen after the war. His governorship saw advances in the transport infrastructure in Nyasaland and the cultivation of many crops.

== Early career ==
George Smith was born on 8 March 1858, the son of Hugh Smith from Darvel, Ayrshire. After receiving a private education he joined the War Office in 1878. The following year he transferred to the office of the chief secretary (the senior civil servant) of British Cyprus as a clerk. He was promoted to chief clerk in 1881 and to assistant chief secretary of the protectorate in 1883.

From 1886 to 1891 Smith served as clerk to the protectorates legislative council and was acting chief secretary from May to October 1888. From 1891 he was district commissioner at Paphos. Smith married Lucy McDuff Cargill in 1894, with whom he had three daughters. From 1895 he served as a member of the legislative council and from 1905 to 1909 he was acting receiver general and chief collector of customs. Smith transferred to the crown colony of British Mauritius as colonial secretary in 1910, holding the position for three years.

== Nyasaland ==
Smith reached the usual civil service retirement age of 55 in 1913 but was offered an opportunity to prolong his career. Smith was appointed governor and Commander in Chief of the protectorate of Nyasaland on 23 September 1913. He was appointed a Knight Commander of the Order of Saint Michael and Saint George in 1914. In the early part of his term Smith clashed with the tribal chiefs of the Ngoni people. Poor soil condition and overgrazing had led to a time of famine and many of the Ngoni found the hut tax unaffordable. The chiefs asked Smith to reduce the tax for the most needy, but he refused. Relations continued to deteriorate during the First World War (1914–1918) during which Nyasaland was a key route to supply and reinforce British forces in East Africa. Smith implemented unpopular measures such as the centralisation of powers previously held by the chiefs, calling for Africans to enlist in the British forces and requisitioning food from areas already facing shortages.

One of Smith's first actions during the war was to commandeer all ships on Lake Nyasa and launch an attack upon the German vessel Hermann von Wissmann at Sphinx Hafen. On 20 August 1914 Smith mobilised the Nyasaland Volunteer Reserve which defended the colony from a German invasion and later served elsewhere in the East African campaign. After the 1915 Chilembwe uprising, which he moved swiftly to quash, Smith noted that it marked "a new phase in the existence of Nyasaland" and established a commission to investigate its causes. Smith was granted responsibility for administering the former German East African territories occupied by British forces advancing from Nyasaland and sent many of his civil servants into these areas.

After the war a large number of ex-servicemen migrated to Nyasaland and Smith took measures in 1918 to limit the leasing of crown land to these men, as he determined that it was needed for the resettlement of Africans evicted from their farms. He also set about reforming the police service, which had been a recommendation of the Chilembwe commission. Smith attempted to put in place reforms to improve the social development of the protectorate including expanding healthcare provision. He opened 70 rural dispensaries which allowed for a fivefold increase in the number of patients treated by his health service.

Smith retired as governor on 12 April 1923, having served an unusually long term for a colonial governor. The war had adversely affected Smith's plans to improve transport infrastructure in the protectorate and create links to the rest of the world. However, by Smith's retirement the government's plans for the Dona Ana Bridge in neighbouring Mozambique, that would allow rail communications to the port of Beira, were well progressed and a railway laid to Lake Nyasa. In Smith's term the number of acres devoted to tea, cotton and tobacco cultivation increased more than a hundredfold. During the war he greatly expanded Nyasaland's road network and expanded maize production, and also acted to control rinderpest.

Smith retired to Addlestone, Surrey. In 1924 Smith wrote an article for the journal African Affairs on the economic development and future of Nyasaland. He died on 14 June 1938 in Addlestone of a combination of pneumonia, chronic bronchitis, and arteriosclerosis.
