= A. L. Bruce Estates =

A. L. Bruce Estates was one of three largest owners of agricultural estates in colonial Nyasaland. Alexander Low Bruce, the son-in-law of David Livingstone, acquired a large estate at Magomero in the Shire Highlands of Nyasaland in 1893, together with two smaller ones. On his death, these estates were to operate as a trust to bring Christianity and Commerce to Central Africa. However his two sons later formed a commercial company which bought the estates from the trust. The company gained a reputation for the harsh exploitation and ill-treatment of its tenants under a labour system known by the African term "thangata", which operated in the plantation cultivation of cotton and tobacco. This exploitation was one of the causes of the 1915 uprising led by John Chilembwe, which resulted in the deaths of three of the company's European employees. After the failure of its own cotton and tobacco plantations, the company forced its tenants to grow tobacco rather than food on their own land and significantly underpaid them. Following almost three decades of losses, the Magomero estate was in poor condition, but the company was able to sell it at a profit between 1949 and 1952 because the government needed land for resettlement of African former tenants evicted from private estates. The company was liquidated in 1959.

== Origins ==
=== Alexander Low Bruce ===
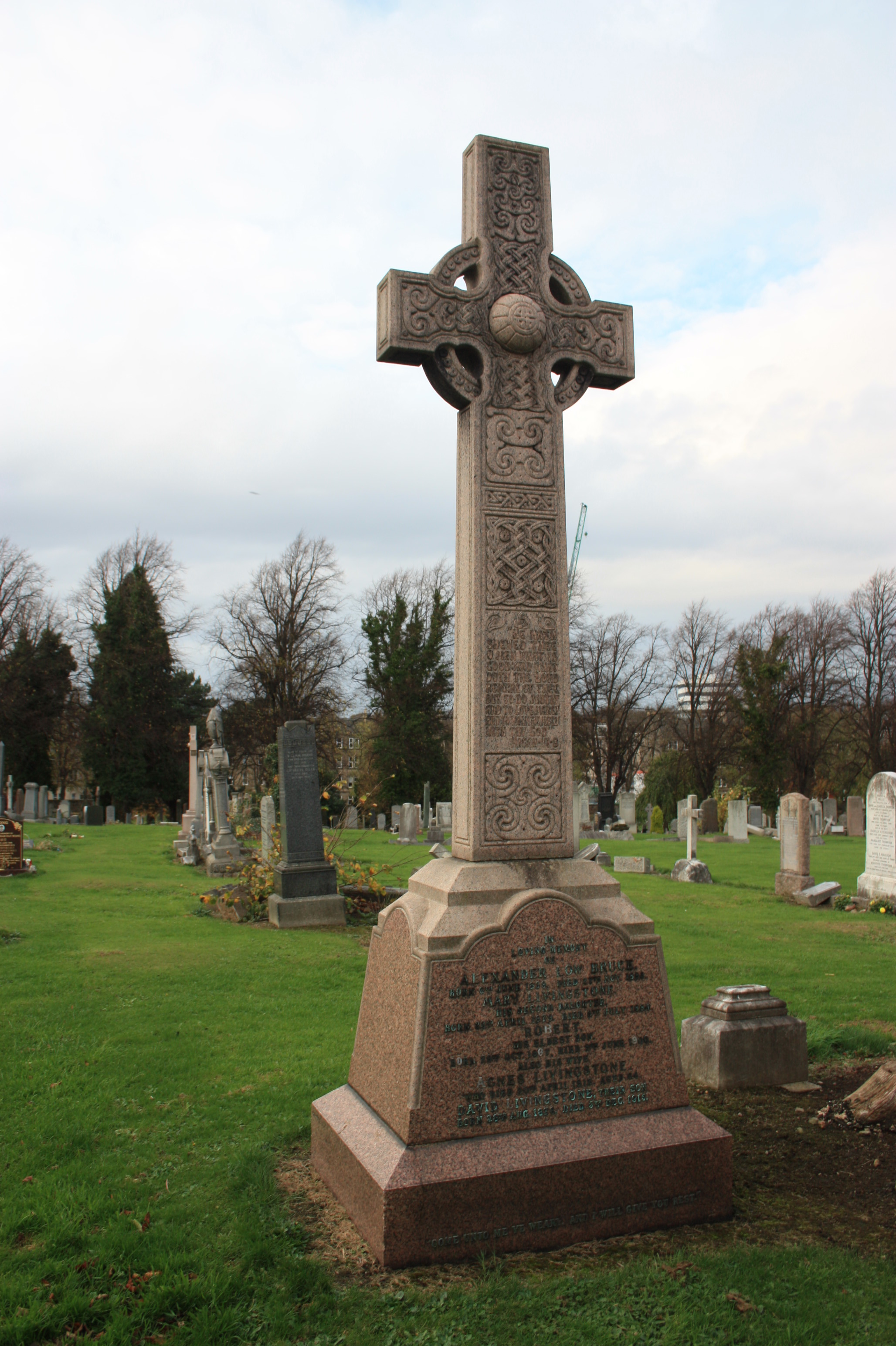
The grave of Alexander Low Bruce (1839-1893), Morningside Cemetery, Edinburgh

Alexander Low Bruce was born in Edinburgh in 1839, the son of Robert Bruce and Ann Low, and he attended the Royal High School there. After leaving school, he went to work for the brewing firm of William Younger and Company at the age of 19. In his 20s, Bruce worked in the firm's London office and in promoting its activities in North America. In 1876, he became a partner and joint manager of the main Edinburgh brewery. In 1887, Alexander Low Bruce became Deputy Chairman of Younger's, and he had other significant financial interests. Bruce was an active member of the Liberal Party until the Irish Home Rule crisis of 1886 split the party and he became a leading Scottish member of the Liberal Unionist Party.

Bruce married twice; by his first wife he had three children, Agnes (b. 1865), Robert (b. 1867) and Daniel (b. 1869), all born when he was living in Islington, Middlesex. In 1875, Alexander Low Bruce's second marriage was to Agnes (1847–1912), the daughter of David Livingstone and his wife Mary (née Moffat). The Bruces had four children, David Livingstone Bruce (1877–1915), Mary Livingstone Bruce (1879–1883), Alexander Livingstone Bruce (1881–1954) and Annie Livingstone Bruce (1883–1954) who married Thomas Russell in 1909. Alexander Low Bruce shared Livingstone's views on the role of legitimate trade in combating the East African slave trade and, after his marriage to Agnes Livingstone, Bruce's interests turned towards the support of commercial and missionary organisations in East and Central Africa, and in 1888 he visited Kuruman, where Robert Moffat established his mission, and where his wife had been born. He was a founding member of the Royal Scottish Geographical Society and became a director of the African Lakes Company, which had interests in what is now Malawi, and of the Imperial British East Africa Company, with interests in Kenya.

=== Magomero ===
Bruce never visited Nyasaland, but obtained title to some 170,000 acres of land, most of it in a single block south of Zomba through his association with the African Lakes Company and the agency of John Buchanan, a planter who brokered sales of land by local chiefs. He named this estate Magomero after an earlier, unsuccessful, missionary venture there which Livingstone had promoted. On his death in 1893, aged 54, title to his African assets passed under his will to the A. L. Bruce Trust, whose main beneficiaries were his two sons.

Shortly before his death in November 1893, Bruce had appointed two managers for his principal estates in Nyasaland. These were William Jervis Livingstone, who took control of the main estate of Magomero (Chiradzulu District) and D. B. Ritchie in charge of the Likulezi Estate at Mlanje. Initially, Agnes assumed oversight of the A. L. Bruce Trust until Bruce's heirs, David and Alexander, came of age, when they were able take it over its management, and she remained a trustee until her death. The provisions of their father's will expressed his wish about how his sons, as trustees, should manage the estates:

"...in the hope and expectation that they will take an interest in the opening up of Africa to Christianity and Commerce on the lines laid down by their grandfather the late David Livingstone."

However, after their mother's death in 1912, and as the Magomero estate showed potential, David Livingstone Bruce and Alexander Livingstone Bruce purchased the assets of the A. L. Bruce Trust in 1913, paying just over £41,000 for the estates. They then incorporated A. L. Bruce Estates Ltd in 1913 with a share capital of £54,000, largely held by themselves and their surviving sister Annie Russell (née Bruce).

== Early Developments ==
At the time Magomero was acquired, it was largely unoccupied and uncultivated, and it was necessary to find a suitable crop and workers. Between 1895 and 1925, the company had tried growing coffee, cotton and Flue-cured tobacco: they all failed. Instead of local people, workers at Magomero were generally "Anguru", a term employed by Europeans to describe as a number of different Lomwe speaking migrants from the parts of Mozambique to the east of the Shire Highlands. These Lomwe were welcomed at Magomero as tenants, and initially the men had no obligation to work in lieu of rent for their first two years. After this initial period, they were required to work for only one month a year: by custom, single women including widows, were exempt from this. By 1915, Lomwe migrants made up almost half the 4,926 hut owners at Magomero.

Arabica coffee was the first estate crop grown in much of the Shire Highlands, and was quite widely planted in the 1890s, until a worldwide collapse in coffee prices in 1903. About 200 to 300 acres of coffee bushes were planted at Magomero from 1895, but after poor crops in 1898 and 1899, the estate's management looked for a more suitable crop. Following the collapse of coffee prices, the Shire Highlands estates next turned to cotton from 1903. Growing Egyptian cotton, the first variety attempted, was unsuccessful in the Shire Highlands, because it was more suitable for the hotter Shire Valley. However, from 1906, W. J. Livingstone developed a hardier variety of Upland cotton called Nyasaland Upland, and by 1908 had planted 1,000 acres at Magomero, increased to 5,000 acres by 1914. Cotton required intensive labour over a long growing period, and this resulted in increasing labour demands being made on the tenants.

On Lukulesi estate of 7,449 acres, the A. L. Bruce Trust first experimented with cotton, coffee, rubber and sisal and chillies. Coffee was as unsuitable for the cool, wet uplands of Mulanje, but tea was planted and from 1904 its tea bushes were producing tea for export. The quality was generally poor, as the estate had no expertise in preparing the tea.

== Thangata ==
In order to ensure that 3,000 to 5,000 workers were available throughout the five or six month long growing season of cotton, the obligations of labour tenants were exploited, wages were withheld, not paid in full or only in kind, and violent coercion was used. The term "thangata" was used to describe these labour obligations. The word originally meant help, as in the reciprocal help that neighbours might give each other, but came to mean the amount of labour that a tenant on a European-owned estate has to give in return for their tenancy. Additional labour services were also required in lieu of Hut tax which the estate owner paid on behalf of tenants.

Alexander Livingstone Bruce was said to have pioneered the thangata system, and even if others had led the way, his manager, W. J. Livingstone, exploited it rigorously once the Magomero estate started to grow cotton . Although W. J. Livingstone was manager, Alexander Livingstone Bruce lived in Nyasaland and had control of the estate operations. On the Bruce estates, the total obligations could amount to four or five months a year, much of this in the growing season, leaving tenants with little time to grow their own food. Unmarried women and widows who were tenants were now required to provide labour, although previously they had been exempted. Tenancies were based on verbal contracts, and tenants had little or no chance to dispute the owners’ interpretations of them.

W. J. Livingstone was killed in the 1915 uprising led by John Chilembwe, largely because of the severity of his management. Following the uprising, the protectorate government passed an Ordinance in 1917, which sought to displace thangata by prohibiting labour in place of cash rents. However, Alexander Livingstone Bruce, who was a member of the Governor's Executive Council, led estate owners in threatening massive evictions if this were implemented, and thangata remained It was Bruce rather than the murdered Livingstone who had banned schools from the estate and prevented Chilembwe from building any churches there, and he stated his opposition to all schools for African workers. Even after Livingstone's killing, the labour obligation on the A. L. Bruce Estates remained at up to six months for thangata and Hut tax. However, as the Crown lands nearest to the estates were already crowded, and as most of the estate tenants had no claim to settle on them because they had migrated from Mozambique, they had little option but to stay. When the demand for estate labour declined in the later 1920s, the owners claimed they had insufficient work for tenants to meet their labour obligations or to pay rent. They claimed that such tenants had become rent-free squatters, and wanted to use the threat of eviction to compel them to grow saleable economic crops. Although after 1925 the company chose to take tobacco or cash instead of labour, the potential thangata obligation only ended when A. L. Bruce Estates Ltd. sold Magamero and the tenants were released from what seemed to them to be a form of serfdom

== John Chilembwe ==
John Chilembwe was born in southern Nyasaland in 1870 or 1871. He attended a mission school, and in 1892 became a house servant of the radical missionary Joseph Booth, who was critical of other missions’ reluctance to treat Africans as equals. Chilembwe became acquainted with Booth's radical religious and egalitarian ideas and in 1897, he went to the United States and attended a Negro Baptist Theological college where he was exposed to radical American Negro ideas.

He was ordained as a Baptist minister in 1899 and returned to Nyasaland in 1900. With the financial backing of the National Baptist Convention of America, Chilembwe started the Providence Industrial Mission in Chiradzulu district. In its first decade, the mission progressed, if slowly, with regular donations from America. He preached the values of hard-work, self-respect and self-help and deplored the condition of Nyasaland Africans, at first avoiding direct criticism of the government. Chilembwe also developed contacts with independent, African churches, aiming to form a united group centred on his own mission.

However, by 1912 or 1913, Chilembwe had become more politically militant and more critical of the conditions of labour tenants in the Shire Highlands, particularly those on A. L. Bruce Estates. The Providence Industrial Mission was in an area dominated by these estates, with many "Anguru" or Lomwe migrant tenants in its congregation. Many of those convicted of rebellion after the uprising were identified as "Anguru", the majority members of Chilembwe's church. Chilembwe and other educated Africans, some of whom were prominent in the 1915 rising, were also angered by the refusal of the government and European settlers to accept the worth of African people and provide suitable opportunities or a political voice to educated African "new men". From around 1910, he faced several problems in the mission and personally, including debts, the loss of funds from America, the death of a daughter, asthma and his declining eyesight. These may have deepened his sense of alienation and desperation. However, it was the outbreak and effects of the First World War that moved him from verbal protest to planning to take action, which he believed it was his destiny to lead, for the deliverance of his people.

=== Chilembwe's Uprising ===
A battle at Karonga in September 1914 caused Chilembwe to voice an impassioned opposition to the war, saying that some of his countrymen, "have already shed their blood", others were "crippled for life" and "invited to die for a cause which is not theirs". Soon after, he gathered together a small group of educated Africans, who began with him to organise a rebellion against British rule in December 1914 and early January 1915. The first part of the plan was to attack government centres on the night of 23 to 24 January 1915 to obtain arms and ammunition, and the second was to attack European estates at the same time. Most of his 200 men were from his Providence Industrial Missions in Chiradzulu and Mlanje, and he hoped that other discontented Africans would join as the rising progressed. The first part of the plan failed almost completely: some of his lieutenants did not carry out their attacks, so few arms were obtained.

The attack on European estates was largely one on the Bruce estates, where W. J. Livingstone, (the object of particular hatred) was killed and beheaded. Two other European employees and three Africans were also killed by the rebels, a European mission was set on fire and a missionary was severely wounded. On Sunday 24 January, Chilembwe held a service in the Providence Industrial Mission church next to a pole impaling Livingstone's head, but by 26 January he realised that the uprising had failed. After apparently trying to escape into Mozambique, he was tracked down and killed on 3 February. Most of his leading followers and some other participants were executed after summary trials under Martial law shortly after the revolt failed.

== Tobacco Growing ==
Flue-cured Virginia tobacco became the favoured crop of many European planters in the Shire Highlands in the second decade of the 20th century. The areas farmed rose from 4,507 acres in 1911 to 10,489 acres in 1913 and 14,218 acres in 1920, yielding an average tobacco crop of 407 pounds an acre. Before 1920, only about 5% of the crop marketed was dark-fired tobacco produced by African farmers, but this rose to about 1 million pounds or 14% by 1923. The First World War boosted the production of European-farmed, flue-cured Virginia leaf, but post-war competition from the United States Virginia prompted a rebate one-sixth of import duties to assist Empire growers. Much of the tobacco produced by Nyasaland's European estates, particularly by smaller growers, was of low-grade and often unsaleable. In 1921, only 1,500 tons of a 3,500 ton crop could be sold immediately: the cost of the relatively expensive flue-curing process (when overproduction was leading to reduced sale prices) made low-grade tobacco unprofitable, and put the smaller European growers out of business. Europeans produced 86% of Nyasaland's tobacco in 1924, but only 57% in 1927 and 28% in 1933.

At the end of the First World War, Major Sanderson became W. J. Livingstone's eventual successor as manager and pioneered growing flue-cured tobacco at Magomero. In 1914, Magomero had 5,000 acres under cotton, but by 1918 it was becoming less profitable, because African growers on Native Trust Land could produce cotton more cheaply. Even after Livingstone's killing, the thangata obligation on the A. L. Bruce Estates was little modified, sometimes amounting to six months work a year. However, as the Crown land nearest to the estates was already crowded, and as most estate tenants had no claim to settle there, they had little option but to stay. The A. L. Bruce Estates Ltd accounts first showed a deficit in 1920, and Sanderson attempted to stop further settlement, claiming there was insufficient work for tenants to meet their labour obligations or to pay rent. In part, this was because only 15,000 acres of Magomero's of 162,000 acres were farmed directly by the owner or sharecroppers in 1920. Sanderson argued that such tenants become rent-free squatters, and wanted to use the threat of eviction to compel them to grow saleable economic crops. However, it was more profitable for African farmers to grow dark-fired tobacco on Crown land, and from 1925 A. L. Bruce Estates was permanently in deficit.

=== Natives on Private Estates Ordinance ===
The company's decline was partly arrested by the Natives on Private Estates Ordinance 1928, which made rents in cash or kind an alternative to labour under thangata. After Sanderson died, he was replaced by Captain Kincaid-Smith, who became general manager in 1931. Kincaid-Smith was able to acquire large quantities of tenants’ tobacco, as 150 pounds (about 70 kilograms) of dark-fired leaf was required to satisfy their annual rent; he also bought amounts in excess of rents in kind, deferring payment until the tobacco was sold. The value of this tobacco was well in excess of the cash rent, and in theory, tenants could only sell to the Bruce Estates, but some tobacco was sold at a better price elsewhere by claiming it was smallholder produced. Curing tobacco required large amounts of firewood, and by 1945 the estate was severely deforested.

In the 1930s, the colonial government considered A. L. Bruce Estates Ltd to be a conscientious landlord, managing its estates closely rather than seeking cash rents, and less likely to attempt evictions when selling off land than the other major estate companies. Before the 1940s it sold or leased little of its land to smaller planters, preferring to farm it directly or through tenants. This was largely because of the stubbornness of Alexander Livingstone Bruce, and his refusal to face economic realities. A. L. Bruce Estates Ltd was undercapitalised, but Bruce refused to sell off some of its land to raise new funds, and he financially supported the company. Bruce's insistence on competing against African farmers on Native Trust Land who were more efficient because of lower overheads, caused increasing tension between the company and its tenants. Many tenants preferred to grow maize or cassava for sale on local markets rather than tobacco, which had to be sold to A. L. Bruce Estates Ltd at a low price, with payment deferred. Kincaid-Smith, the general manager, ordered the food crops to be uprooted, but met fierce opposition, and the government condemned his actions. In December 1939, the Governor forced Kincaid-Smith to leave Nyasaland because his action had almost caused another rising.

== The Final Years ==
After the departure of Kincaid-Smith, the company ceased to manage its estates actively, and by 1948 the estates were described as having many tenants who produced all its crops, as the owner was merely their broker. Magomero produced 500,000 to 700,000 pounds of tobacco a year, but the company paid badly for this, and many tenants preferred to grow maize to sell in local markets, avoiding selling through the company. In 1945, A. L. Bruce Estates Ltd announced it wished to sell Magomero. A government survey of the estate showed that it had been badly managed, deforested, and that its soil and grassland had been abused. Nevertheless, the Governor felt it was necessary to buy the land through negotiation with the company, not by compulsory purchase. Bruce Estates wanted a figure that would wipe out its accumulated losses since 1925, but this was considered excessive, and in 1947 the company provisionally agreed to sell Magomero to a private buyer at a price of £80,000. However, this sale fell through.

A. L. Bruce Estates Ltd made further substantial losses in 1948 and 1949, and was virtually insolvent. However, the government's need for land for re-settlement after the 1949 famine caused it to start negotiations with the company. Some of the estate was sold to private buyers, but around 75,000 acres was bought by the government in 1952, about 47,000 acres of which was of poor quality. These land sales made good the past deficits, and after some disputes between shareholders, the company was wound-up as a solvent entity in 1959. Alexander Livingstone Bruce died in 1954, but survived to the completion of the sale of the estate his father had acquired almost 60 years before.

== Published Sources ==
- J McCracken, (2012). A History of Malawi, 1859-1966, Woodbridge, James Currey. ISBN 978-1-84701-050-6.
- L. White, (1987). Magomero: Portrait of an African Village, Cambridge University Press. ISBN 0-521-32182-4
- L. White, (1984). 'Tribes' and the Aftermath of the Chilembwe Rising, African Affairs, Vol. 83, No. 333.
- G. Shepperson and T. Price, (1958). Independent African: John Chilembwe and the Origins, Setting and Significance of the Nyasaland Native Rising of 1915, Edinburgh University Press.
- R. Tangri, (1971). Some New Aspects of the Nyasaland Native Rising of 1915, African Historical Studies, Vol. 4, No. 2.
- R. I. Rotberg, (1970). Psychological Stress and the Question of Identity: Chilembwe's Revolt Reconsidered, in R I. Rotberg and A. A. Mazrui, eds., Protest and Power in Black Africa, New York, Oxford University Press. ISBN 978-019-500093-1
- R. I. Rotberg, (1965). The Rise of Nationalism in Central Africa: The Making of Malawi and Zambia, 1873-1964, Cambridge (Mass), Harvard University Press.
- F A Stinson, (1956). Tobacco Farming in Rhodesia and Nyasaland 1889-1956, Salisbury, the Tobacco Research Board of Rhodesia and Nyasaland.
- R Palmer,(1985). White Farmers in Malawi: Before and After the Depression, African Affairs Vol. 84 No. 335.
- B Pachai, (1973). Land Policies in Malawi: An Examination of the Colonial Legacy, The Journal of African History Vol. 14.
