= Nguludi =

- Village
- Location in Malawi
- Coordinates: 15°48′S 35°10′E
- Country: Malawi
- Region: Southern Region
- Climate: Cwa

Nguludi is a village in southeastern Malawi, several kilometres east of Limbe and Blantyre. During the colonial era it was renowned for its plantations. It is surrounded by Ntonya hills and village in the east; Nguludi (sic) hills in the West whose very bottom is anchored by Mwenye village 2; Nthanyiwa and Chatha villages to its extreme North; Tapara village in the south and Mpira village in the South west. A mission hospital known as St Joseph's Hospital renders both basic and most crucial health services in and around Nguludi. There is also St Joseph's College of Nursing which trains future medical personnel. It also has the biggest church for the Nguludi parish whose out-station churches are: Chitambuli, Mombezi, Nchocholo, St Theresa (aka Sachima, Makunami or ku Senti), Naphiyo, Likhomo, Njuzi and Kwanjana. The mission was established by Missionaries of Africa and the Marist Fathers in 1901. It was ransacked in the Chilembwe Rising of 1915. It also boasts of a small museum which is usually used as an out-station by the Department of Antiquities which is headquartered in Malawi's capital city, Lilongwe.

Nguludi is in fact divided into three categories as follows: Nguludi Turn Off which is off the Robert Mugabe Highway (the then Midima Road) close to Malabvi CCAP and Primary School. It is also known as Two-by-Two. It is also home to Nguludi Community Day Secondary School and quite a few entertainment circles which are just springing up.

Further down, soon after Chisombezi River to the extreme right is the Nguludi Montfort. This is, according to the gone elders, where Montfort Press was first established. It is also the home to the Catholic University, Pius XII Seminary, Montfort School for the Deaf, Blind, primary school and a convent for sisters. Overlooking the school for the deaf football ground is the home to Brothers of Immaculate conception (BIC). This once used to be headed by Brother Tarcisio (fondly, known by the Nguludi denizens as, Burathva Timba simply because of his thin body resembling a certain kind of wild bird). Next to Pius XII is home to a religious sect which used to be headed by Brother Manjankhosi. This sect is famous for maize-mill business. Next to this campus is the home to Brothers of the Frates Immaculate Conception (FIC) which used to be headed by Brother Mathias (fondly, the locals chichewalised his name to Burathva Matiyasi). The FIC brothers were famous for building business. In fact, Brothers Timba and Matiyasi played a great role in the development of Nguludi as it stands today with the help of Brother Herman Tenwolde and others.

The most obvious place referred to as Nguludi (supra) is the one where there is Nguludi Church (the headquarters of Nguludi parish). This is the place where one can find Nguludi Boys and Girls Primary Schools, St Joseph's Hospital and College of Nursing, Roman Catholic fathers' house and a convent; a girls boarding facility, vast forest of blue-gum trees and its surrounding villages.
