= Mikalongwe =

Coordinates: 15°9′S 35°2′E

Mikalongwe is a town in Thyolo District in the south of Malawi. It is situated on the Thuchia river.

In 1915, the town had more than 4,617 huts and formed part of the estate of the British Central Africa Company.
