= Hut tax =

Tax in colonial Africa

The hut tax was a form of taxation introduced by European colonial powers in their African colonies on a "per hut" (or other forms of household) basis. Colonised peoples paid the tax variously in money, labour, grain or stock. This benefited the colonial authorities in three interconnected ways:

- by raising money
- by supporting the economic (and colonially controlled) value of the local currency
- by broadening the newly introduced cash-based colonial economy, forcing natives (eg. South Africans) into laboring for colonial establishments, making them dependant on the colonial economy for income.

Households in which people had primarily worked as rural ranchers or as farmers proceeded to send members to work in cities or on colonial government-sponsored construction projects to earn money to pay the tax. The new colonial economies in Africa were primarily reliant upon the construction of towns and infrastructure (such as railways), and in South Africa upon the rapidly expanding mining operations.

== Union of South Africa ==
By 1908 the following hut taxes were introduced in the colony of South Africa:

- In Natal, under Law 13 of 1857, 14 shillings per hut. Africans that lived in European-style houses with only one wife were exempt from the tax.
- In the Transkei, 10 shillings per hut.
- In the Cape Colony, various forms of the "house duty" had existed since the 1850s. The tax was legally applicable to all house-owners in the Cape, regardless of race or religion, but was only partially enforced, especially in rural areas. A full and universally applicable house tax was imposed in 1870 (Act 9 of 1870), and was more fully enforced, due to the government's severe financial difficulties at the time. (Note: For houses valued under £100, five shillings were levied; for houses valued between £100 and £500, ten shillings were levied; for houses valued between £500 and £1,000, twenty shillings were levied; and for every additional £500 above, an additional ten shillings were added to the tax amount.) The highly unpopular tax was terminated in 1872 (Act 11 of 1872), but a new and higher duty was applied by the Sprigg administration during 1878, when government expenditure was extremely high. The Cape's most controversial "hut tax" was established under Act 37 of 1884, and specified 10 shillings per hut with exclusions for the elderly and infirm. It was repealed under Act 4 of 1889.

== Mashonaland ==
In the colony of Mashonaland, now part of modern-day Zimbabwe, a hut tax was introduced at the rate of ten shillings per hut in 1894. Although authorized by the Colonial Office in London, the tax was paid to the British South Africa Company (BSAC), acting on behalf of the British government in the area. Various events such as the introduction of the hut tax, disputes over cattle and a series of natural disasters contributed to the decision of the Shona to rebel against the company in 1896, which became known as the First Chimurenga or Second Matabele War.

== Other countries ==
The tax was also used in Kenya, Uganda and Northern Rhodesia (now Zambia). In Sierra Leone, it sparked the Hut Tax War of 1898 in the Ronietta district, in which substantial damage was sustained to the establishments of the Home Missionary Society. The damage sustained by the Society led to an international tribunal regarding restitution for the damages suffered, brought by the American government on behalf of the Home Missionary Society. The society was compensated for damages done to them by Sierra Leonean rioters, but Great Britain was held not liable.

Liberia also implemented a hut tax, which in one case led to a Kru revolt in 1915.
