= Magomero =

Village in Malawi

Coordinates: 15°36′S 35°16′E

Magomero is an estate and a village in Malawi. It is situated south of Zomba.

== History ==
Although Alexander Low Bruce never visited Nyasaland, he obtained title to some 170,000 acres of land there through his association with the African Lakes Company and the agency of John Buchanan, a planter who also brokered land sales by local chiefs. Of this land, 162,000 acres formed the estate that he named Magomero. After a village that David Livingstone had recorded in the same area during his Zambezi expedition.
