= Africville Apology =

2010 formal government pronouncement in Halifax, Canada

Coordinates: 44°40′28.5″N 63°37′6.6″W

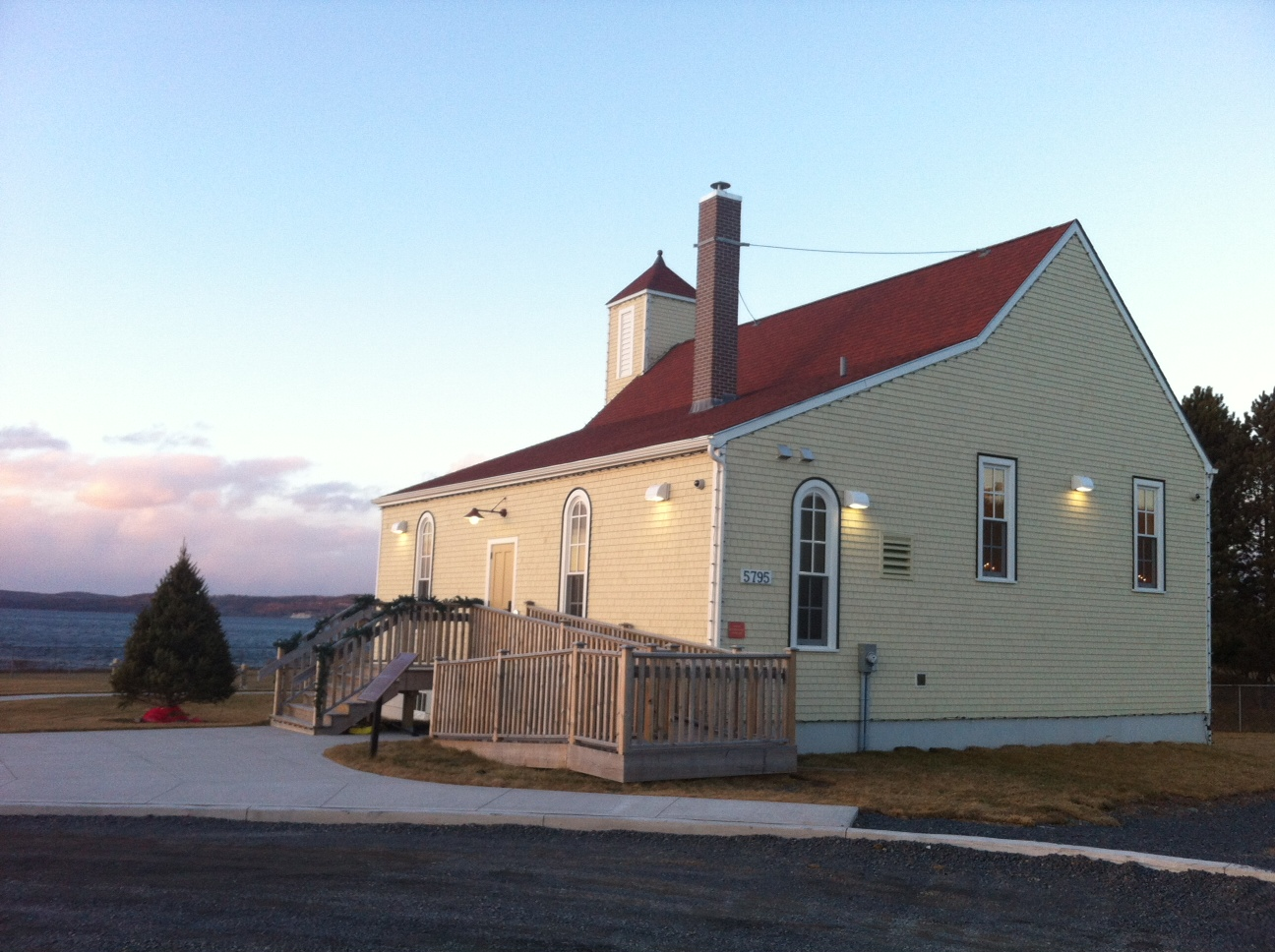
Africville Church (est. 1849) – rebuilt as part of the Africville Apology

The Africville Apology was a formal pronouncement delivered on 24 February 2010 by the City of Halifax, Nova Scotia for the eviction and eventual destruction of Africville, a Black Nova Scotian community.

== Historical context ==
During the 1940s and 1950s in different parts of Canada, the federal, provincial and municipal governments were working together to take communities labelled "slums" and relocate the people to better housing. The intent was to use the land for business and industry. Many years earlier, and again in 1947, after a major fire burnt several Africville houses, the topic of relocation of Africville was discussed. Concrete plans of relocation, stimulated by the 1957 Stephenson Report, did not officially emerge until 1961 with the creation of the City's Department of Development.

In 1962, Halifax adopted the relocation proposal unanimously. Promising free lawyers and social workers, as well as such things as job training, employment assistance, education services to those affected, the Rose Report (publ. 1964) was passed 37/41 in favour of relocation to other locations in Halifax. The report never went into details or analyzed what the lives of residents would be like in their new homes, but was insistent that their best interests were at heart.

=== Relocation ===
The relocation took place mainly between 1964 and 1967. The residents were assisted in their move by the City's authorities, moving the Africvillians with city dump trucks. This image forever stuck in the minds and hearts of people and indicated the degrading style in which these people were treated. There were many hardships, suspicion and jealousy that emerged, mostly due to complications of land and ownership claims. Only 14 residents held clear legal titles to their land. Those with no legal rights were given a $500 payment and promised a furniture allowance, social assistance, and public housing units. Young families would make enough money to begin a new life, but most of the elderly residents would not budge as they had much more of an emotional connection to their homes. Though filled with grief and feeling cheated out of their property, resistance to eviction became harder as more people accepted and homes disappeared.

=== Demolition ===
The city quickly demolished each house as soon as residents moved out. The church at Africville was demolished in 1969 at night to avoid controversy. The last Africville home was demolished on 2 January 1970.

Part of Africville is now occupied by a highway interchange that services the A. Murray MacKay Bridge; however, the port development at Fairview Cove did not extend as far east as Africville, leaving the waterfront intact.

== Developing redress ==
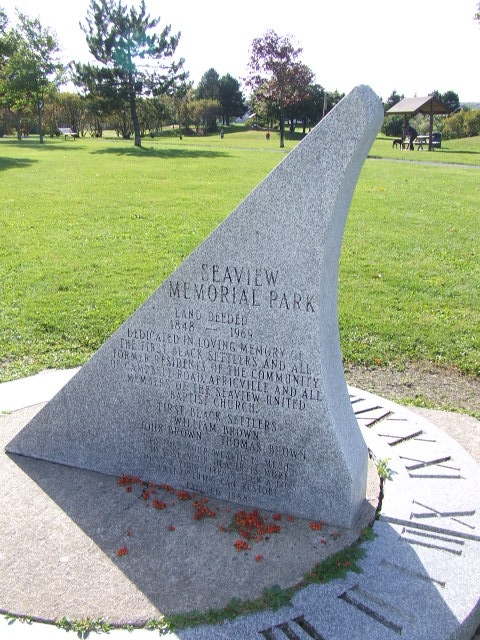
The founding families of Africville listed on the Africville Monument at Seaview Memorial Park

Efforts to address the plight of the Africville relocation happened over 25 years. These efforts were largely led by the Africville Genealogy Society.

In light of the controversy surrounding the community, the City of Halifax created Seaview Memorial Park on the site in the 1980s, preserving it from development. Former Africville residents such as Eddie Carvery carried out periodic protests at the park throughout the 1980s and 1990s.

In 1989, a historic exhibit about Africville toured across Canada and evolved into a permanent exhibit on display at Nova Scotia's Black Cultural Centre in Preston. In 2001, a United Nations report called for reparations to be paid to the community of Africville.

=== Music ===
Numerous musicians have commemorated the story of Africville, in part, to pressure governments to provide redress.

- African-Canadian singer-songwriter Faith Nolan released an album in 1986 called Africville.
- In 1996, Montreal-born jazz pianist Joe Sealy released a CD of original music, Africville Suite, which won a Juno Award in 1997. It includes twelve pieces reflecting on places and activities in Africville, where Sealy's father was born. Sealy worked and lived in Halifax during the time of these events, and began the suite in memory of his father.
- In 1997, Canadian jazz pianist Trevor Mackenzie released the album Ain't No Thing Like a Chicken Wing as a tribute to the neighbourhood where his father grew up.
- In 2007, Newfoundland metal/hardcore band Bucket Truck released a video for their song "A Nourishment by Neglect", which details the events surrounding Africville.
- Also in 2007, Canadian hip hop group Black Union released a song, featuring Maestro, about the historic community of Africville. The music video was recorded in Seaview Park.

=== Film and literature ===
There are various film and theatre productions made to commemorate the plight of Africville.

- Remember Africville (1991), a documentary film released by the National Film Board of Canada, received the Moonsnail Award for best documentary at the Atlantic Film Festival.
- Consecrated Ground (1998), a play by George Boyd and produced by Eastern Front Theatre produced, fictitiously chronicled the Africville eviction.
- The story of Africville is a significant influence on the work of writer George Elliott Clarke.
- Last Days in Africville (2006, Dundum Press), by Dorothy Perkyns, is a fictional account of life for a young Africville girl at the time of its destruction.
- Stolen From Africville (2008) is an independently-produced documentary that follows the lives of those displaced from the Africville community over the course of a year. The film, which Heritage Canada began funding in 2007, was written and directed by Canadian activist and performer Neil Donaldson and Sourav Deb.
- Africaville (2020, Amistad Press), by Jeffrey Colvin, winner of the 2020 Hurston/Wright Legacy Award in the Debut Fiction category, portrays multiple generations of a family and their roots in Africville.

=== Political action ===
In May 2005, MLA Maureen MacDonald (Nova Scotia NDP) introduced a bill in the provincial legislature called the Africville Act. The bill calls for a formal apology from the Nova Scotia Government; a series of public hearings on the destruction of Africville; and the establishment of a development fund towards the historical preservation of Africville lands and towards social development in benefit of former residents and their descendants.

Halifax mayor Peter Kelly has offered land, money, and various other services for a replica of the Seaview African United Baptist Church. After the offer was originally made in 2002, the Africville Genealogy Society requested some alterations to the Halifax offer, including additional land and the possibility of building affordable housing near the site. The Africville site was declared a national historic site in 2002.

== Apology ==
In February 2010, Halifax Council ratified the Africville Apology, and the Government of Canada announced $250,000 for the Africville Heritage Trust to design a museum and build a replica of the community church. On 24 February, Halifax Mayor Peter Kelly made the Africville Apology as part of a $4.5-million compensation deal, officially apologizing for the eviction. Among other things, Kelly said,

We apologize for the heartache experienced at the loss of the Seaview United Baptist Church, the spiritual heart of the community, removed in the middle of the night. We acknowledge the tremendous importance the church had, both for the congregation and the community as a whole. We realize words cannot undo what has been done, but we are profoundly sorry and apologize to all the former residents and their descendants.

On 29 July 2011, the city restored the name Africville to Seaview Park at the annual Africville Family Reunion. The Seaview African United Baptist Church, demolished in 1969, was rebuilt in the summer of 2011 to serve as a church and interpretation centre. The church was ceremonially opened on 25 September.

Rev. Rhonda Britten, a leader in the African-Nova-Scotian community, welcomed the settlement and said it was time to put the past behind them:

I know that there are some among us who are wounded, and some among us who bear those scars. But, in spite of all of that, the victory has been won. We cannot continue to feed our children the bitter pills, we must give them the pills of love. We must plant in them the seeds of unity and victory. That is the only way.

== See also ==
- Black Nova Scotians
