= Africville =

Neighbourhood in Halifax, Nova Scotia, Canada

- Neighbourhood
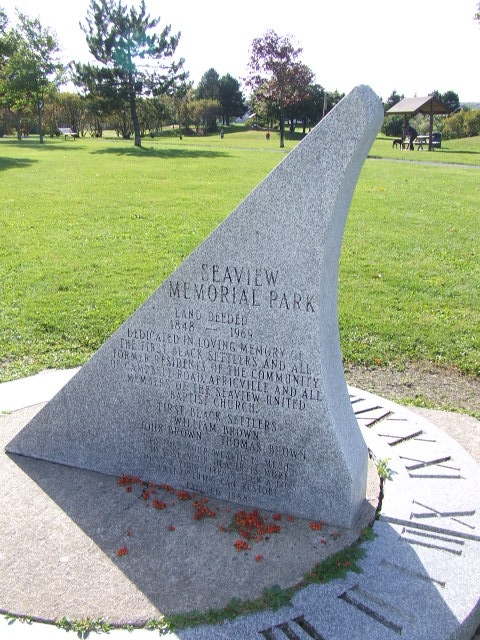
- Founders William, John & Thomas Brown listed on The Africville Monument at Seaview Memorial Park
- Interactive map of Africville
- Coordinates: 44°40′28.5″N 63°37′6.6″W
- Country: Canada
- Province: Nova Scotia
- City: Halifax
- Founder: William Brown Sr.

Population (1917)
  - Total: 400

Africville was a small community of predominantly African Nova Scotians located in Halifax, Nova Scotia, Canada. It developed on the southern shore of Bedford Basin and existed from the early 1800s to the 1960s. From 1970 to the present, a protest has occupied space on the grounds. The government has recognized it as a commemorative site and established a museum here. The community has become an important symbol of Black Canadian identity, as an example of the "urban renewal" trend of the 1960s that razed similarly racialized neighbourhoods across Canada, and the struggle against racism.

Africville was founded in 1848 in Halifax, Nova Scotia, by Black Refugees who had arrived during and after the War of 1812. These Refugees were formerly enslaved African Americans who escaped from the United States and were resettled in Nova Scotia by the British. One of the earliest known settlers and founder of Africville was William Brown Sr., a Black Refugee from the Chesapeake region who arrived in 1815 with his parents and siblings. In 1848, Brown made a private purchase of vacant land overlooking the Bedford Basin. Together with a purchase by William Arnold, their combined 12 acre properties marked the boundaries of what became Africville.

During the 20th century, Halifax neglected the community, failing to provide basic infrastructure and services such as roads, water, and sewerage. The city continued to use the area as an industrial site, notably introducing a waste-treatment facility nearby in 1958. The residents of Africville struggled with poverty and poor health conditions as a result, and the community's buildings became badly deteriorated. During the late 1960s, the City of Halifax condemned the area, relocating its residents to newer housing in order to develop the nearby A. Murray MacKay Bridge, related highway construction, and the Port of Halifax facilities at Fairview Cove to the west. Soon after this, former residents and activists began a long protest on the site against their treatment and the condemnation.

In 1996 the site was designated as a National Historic Site of Canada as being representative of Black Canadian settlements in the province and as an enduring symbol of the need for vigilance in defence of their communities and institutions. After years of protest and investigations, in 2010 the Halifax Council ratified the Africville Apology under an arrangement with the federal government to compensate descendants and their families who had been evicted from the area. In addition, an Africville Heritage Trust was established to design a museum and build a replica of the community church.

== History ==
Africville has been claimed as one of "the first free Black communities outside of Africa," along with other settlements in Nova Scotia.

=== Early settlement ===
First known as the Campbell Road Settlement, Africville began as a small, poor, self-sufficient rural community of about 50 people during the 19th century.

A common myth holds that Africville was among the earliest colonial Black settlements in Nova Scotia, founded by Black Loyalists—formerly enslaved people from the Thirteen Colonies who escaped rebel masters during the American Revolutionary War and were freed by the British. While it is true that the Crown transported Black Loyalists and later Black Refugees of the War of 1812 to Nova Scotia with promises of land and provisions, Africville itself was not part of these original settlements. Instead, Africville was established later, in 1848, through the private purchase of vacant land by William Brown Sr., a Black Refugee from the Chesapeake region, and was gradually developed by other Black refugee families who followed.

Two widely repeated beliefs about Africville's origins are not supported by the historical record. The first is the myth that the community was founded by the Jamaican Maroons, who were exiled from Jamaica to Halifax in 1796; in one version, Prince Edward is credited with granting land at the Bedford Basin to a Black servant named William Brown. The Maroons did not found Africville: Prince Edward had left Nova Scotia before the War of 1812, sociologists Donald Clairmont and Dennis Magill note that "virtually all the Maroons sailed to Sierra Leone in 1800", and the original settlers instead came from Black Refugee settlements elsewhere in Halifax County. Clairmont and Magill describe this Maroon-descent belief as the "more prevalent" of the settlement myths. A second myth holds that Africville's land came from a Crown grant—in one version, that residents' forefathers, having escaped slavery in the United States, were granted the land by Queen Victoria. Clairmont and Magill write that "evidence does not support this belief"; in fact the founders bought the land privately.

In 1836, Campbell Road was constructed, creating an access route along the north side of the Halifax Peninsula. After starting with the Cornwallis Street Baptist Church in 1832, clergyman Richard Preston established the Seaview African United Baptist Church in Africville in 1849, as one of five others in Halifax: Preston (1842), Beechville (1844), Hammonds Plains (1845), and Dartmouth. Accordingly, Preston, along with Septimus Clarke, are credited as co-founders of the African United Baptist Association, a network of Black Baptist churches throughout Nova Scotia.

When the community officially was established, the first land transaction documented on paper was dated 1848. The first two landowners in Africville were William Arnold and William Brown. In the late 1850s, the Nova Scotia Railway, later to become the Intercolonial Railway, was built from Richmond to the south, bisecting Africville with the railway's main line along the western shores of Bedford Basin.

The community became known as Africville around 1900. Many people believed the name came as result of those who lived there having come from Africa; however, this was not the case. One elderly resident of Africville has been quoted as saying "It wasn't Africville out there. None of the people came from Africa...[I]t was part of Richmond (Northern Halifax), just the part where the colour folks lived." Strangers later moved into Africville to take advantage of its unregulated status, selling illicit liquor and sex, largely to the mass of transient soldiers and sailors passing through Halifax.

A second railway line appeared in 1906 with the arrival of the Halifax and Southwestern Railway, which connected to the Intercolonial at Africville. The Intercolonial Railway, later Canadian National Railways, constructed Basin Yard west of the community, adding more tracks. Trains ran through the area constantly.

=== Halifax Explosion ===
With haphazardly positioned dwellings that ranged from small, well-maintained, and brightly painted homes to tiny ramshackle dwellings converted from sheds, the community had a peak population of 400 at the time of the Halifax Explosion in 1917. Elevated land to the south protected Africville from the direct blast of the explosion and the complete destruction that levelled the neighbouring community of Richmond. However, Africville suffered considerable damage. Four Africville residents (as well as one Mi'kmaq woman visiting from Queens County, Nova Scotia) were killed by the explosion. A doctor on a relief train arriving at Halifax noted Africville residents "as they wandered disconsolately around the ruins of their still standing little homes."

In the aftermath of the disaster, Africville received modest relief assistance from the city, but none of the reconstruction and none of the modernization invested into other parts of the city at that time. Beginning in the early 20th century around the Great War, more people had moved there, drawn by jobs in industries and related facilities developed nearby.

== Daily life ==
=== Economy ===
Economically, the first two generations were not prosperous, as labourers had limited opportunities. Many men found employment in low-paying jobs; others worked as seamen or Pullman porters, who would clean and work on train cars. This steady employment on the Pullman cars was considered prestigious at the time, as the men also got to travel and see the country. Only 35% of labourers had regular employment, and 65% of the people worked as domestic servants. Women were also hired as cooks, to clean the hospital or prison, and some elderly women were hired to clean upper-class houses.

=== Education ===
The community was neglected in terms of education. The city built the first elementary school here in 1883, at the expense of community residents. Being a poor community, none of the teachers up until 1933 had obtained formal training. Only 42 % of boys and girls received any education at all, as many families needed to have them help with paid work, or by taking care of younger siblings at home so parents could work. Out of the 140 children ever registered, 60 children reached either grade 7 or 8, and only four boys and one girl reached grade 10.

=== Church ===
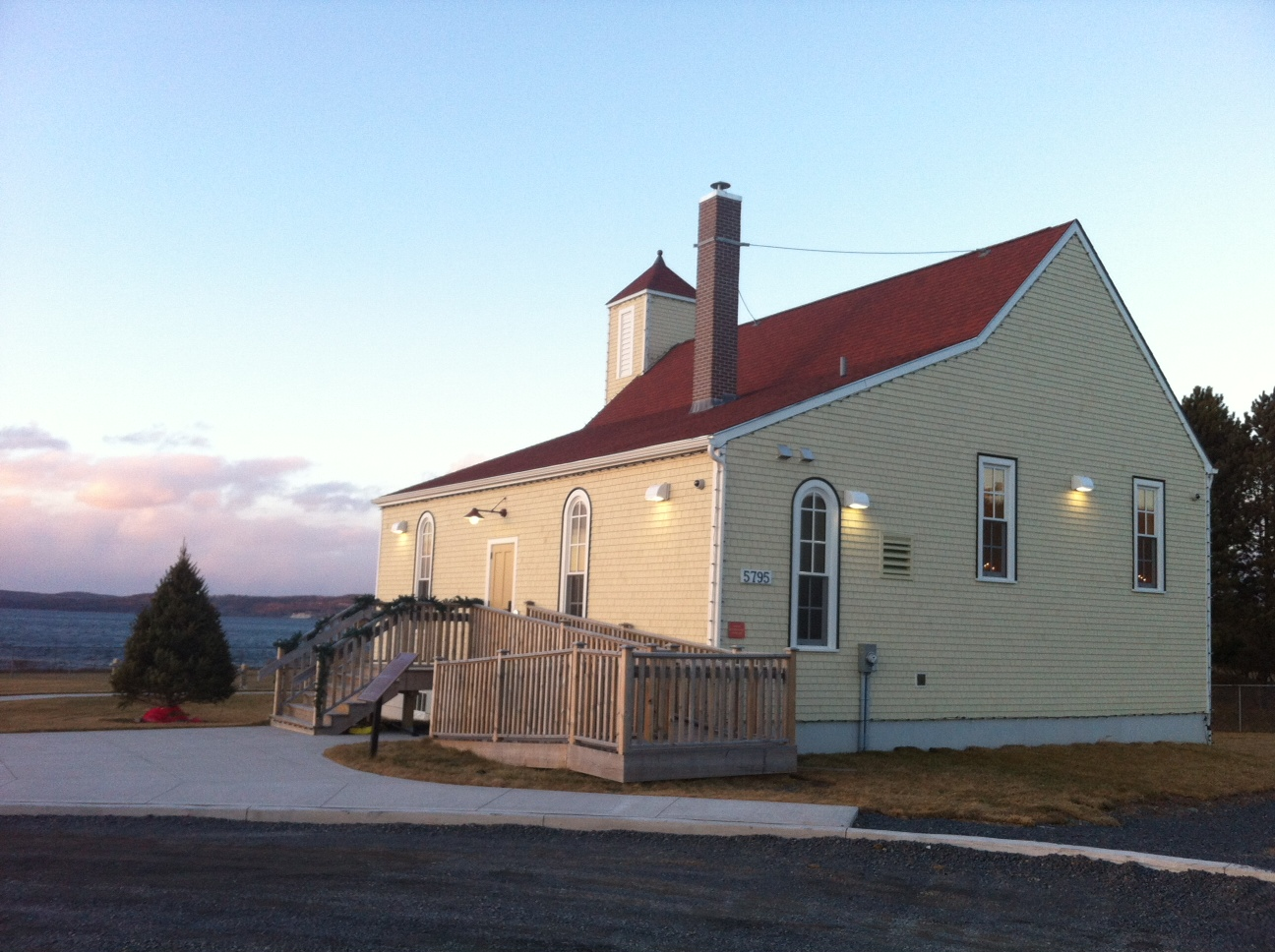
Africville Church (est. 1849), reconstructed in 2011 as part of the government's Africville Apology

To understand Africville, "you got to know about the church;" the life and heart of the town. The Seaview African United Baptist Church was established at Africville in 1849; it joined with other Black Baptist congregations to establish the African Baptist Association in 1854. The community's social life revolved around the church, which was the place of baptisms, weddings, and funerals. Other Black groups came to Africville for Sunday picnics and events. Everything was done through the church, "clubs, youth organizations, ladies' auxiliary and Bible classes."

=== Hockey ===
The Africville Seasides hockey team, of the pioneering Colored Hockey League (1894–1930), won the championship in 1901 and 1902, beating West End Rangers from Prince Edward Island to retain their title in a 3–2 single game victory in February 1902. The team was led by star goaltender William Carvery, his two brothers on the team, along with three Dixon brothers also on the squad.

== Relationship with Halifax ==
Throughout its history, Africville was confronted with isolation. The town never received proper roads, health services, water, street lamps or electricity. Residents protested to the city and called for municipal water supply and treatment of sewage, to no avail. The lack of these services had serious adverse health effects on residents. Contamination of the wells was so frequent that residents had to boil their water before using it for drinking or cooking.

From the mid-19th century, the City of Halifax located its least desirable facilities in the Africville area, where the people had little political power and property values were low. A prison was built there in 1853, an infectious disease hospital in 1870, as well as a slaughterhouse, and a depository for fecal waste from nearby Russellville.

In 1958, the city decided to move the town garbage dump and landfill to the Africville area. While the residents knew they could not legally fight this, they illegally salvaged the dump for usable goods. They would get clothes, copper, steel, brass, tin, etc. The dump contributed to the city's classifying this area as an official slum.

== Razing ==
Scholars have concluded that the razing of Africville was a confluence of "overt and hidden racism, the progressive impulse in favour of racial integration, and the rise of liberal-bureaucratic social reconstruction ideas."

During the 1940s and 1950s in different parts of Canada, the federal, provincial, and municipal governments were working together for urban renewal, particularly after the Allied victory in World War II: there was energy to redevelop areas classified as slums and relocate the people to new and improved housing. The intent was to redevelop some land for "higher" uses with greater economic return: business and industry. Other notable racialized neighbourhoods razed under the banner of urban renewal include The Ward in Toronto, Rooster Town in Winnipeg, and The Bog in Charlottetown.

Many years earlier, and again in 1947 after a major fire burnt several Africville houses, officials discussed redevelopment and relocation of Africville. But more concrete plans of relocation did not officially emerge until 1961. Stimulated by the "Stephenson Report" of 1957 and the establishment of Halifax's Department of Development in 1961, the city proposed relocation of these residents. In 1962, Halifax City Council adopted the relocation proposal unanimously, and the "Rose Report" (publ. 1964) was passed 37/41 in favour of relocation.

=== Formal relocation and demolition ===
The formal relocation took place mainly from 1964 to 1967. Africville existed for over 100 years, housing 80 families and 400 persons when it was demolished. The residents and their belongings were moved by Halifax garbage trucks. This image has been long remembered by the people; they took it to represent the degrading way they were treated before, during, and after the move. Many former residents believe that the city council had no plans to turn Africville into an industrial site and that racism was the basis of the community's destruction. They believe that the city wanted to remove from Halifax a concentrated group of Black people for whom they had no regard. Because of the city's continued negative response to the people of Africville, the community failed to develop, and this failure was then used as a rationale to destroy it.

There were many hardships, suspicion and jealousy that emerged, mostly due to complications of land and ownership claims. Only 14 residents held clear legal titles to their land. Those with no legal rights were given a $500 payment and promised a furniture allowance, social assistance, and public housing units. Young families believed they had enough money to begin a new life, but most of the elderly residents would not budge; they had much more of an emotional connection to their homes. They were filled with grief and felt cheated out of their property. Resistance to eviction became more difficult as residents accepted the buyouts and their homes were demolished.

The city quickly demolished each house as soon as residents moved out. Occasionally the city demolished a house whenever an opportunity presented itself—such as when a resident was in the hospital. On 20 November 1967, the church at Africville was demolished at night to avoid controversy, a year before the city officially possessed the building. There is controversy around the documentation, which shows the church was sold in 1968; the page has been edited by hand to forge the sale as a year earlier. Internal city government documents show the demolition order being sent in 1967, with a claim that the building was dangerous. At the time, it was still in use: residents remember the church being bulldozed in 1967, shortly after the last active service; another service was being planned for the end of the year. It was bulldozed with the vital records of many residents inside, such as birth, marriage, and death records, which could have established chains of custody for land claims.

The last Africville home was demolished on 2 January 1970.

=== Aftermath ===
After relocation to public housing within the city limits, the residents had new problems: cost of living went up in their new homes, more people were unemployed and without regular incomes, none of the promised employment or education programs were implemented, and the city's promises went unfulfilled. "Benefits were so modest as to be virtually irrelevant…within a year and a half this post-relocation program lay in ruins."

Family strains and debt forced many to rely on public assistance, and anxiety was high among the former residents. One of the big complaints was that "they feel no sense of ownership or pride in the sterile public housing projects."

== Post-razing legacy ==
Part of the former territory of Africville is occupied by a highway interchange that serves the A. Murray MacKay Bridge. The port development at Fairview Cove did not extend as far east as Africville, leaving its historic waterfront intact.

In light of the controversy related to the relocation, the city of Halifax created the Seaview Memorial Park on the site in the 1980s, preserving it from development. The park was most often used as an off-leash dog park. Eddie Carvery has been living on the Africville site since 1970 in protest of the razing despite city officials seizing his trailers several times. Likewise, former Africville residents carried out periodic protests at the park throughout the 1980s and 1990s.

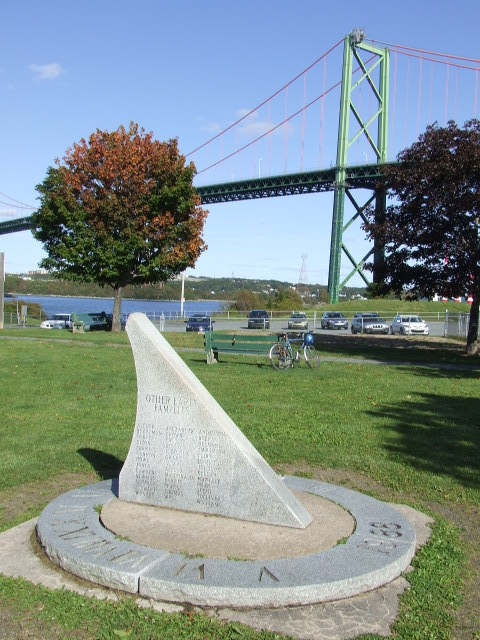
Monument at the site of Africville beside the A. Murray MacKay Bridge

The Africville Genealogy Society was formed in 1983 to track former residents and their descendants. Halifax mayor Peter Kelly offered land, some money, and various other services for a replica of the Seaview African United Baptist Church. After the offer was made in 2002, the Africville Genealogy Society requested some alterations to the Halifax offer, including additional land and the possibility of building affordable housing near the site. The area that once was Africville was thereby declared a national historic site in 2002.

=== Africville apology ===
In May 2005, New Democratic Party of Nova Scotia MLA Maureen MacDonald introduced a bill in the provincial legislature called the Africville Act. The bill called for a formal apology from the Nova Scotia government, a series of public hearings on the destruction of Africville, and the establishment of a development fund to go towards historical preservation of Africville lands and social development in benefit of former residents and their descendants.

On 23 February 2010, the Halifax Council ratified a proposed Africville apology, with an arrangement with the Government of Canada to establish a $250,000 Africville Heritage Trust to design a museum and build a replica of the community church. The dedicated site was a 1-hectare (2.5-acre) area. On 24 February 2010, Halifax Mayor Peter Kelly made the Africville Apology, apologizing for the eviction as part of a $4.5 million compensation deal. The City restored the name Africville to Seaview Park at the annual Africville Family Reunion on 29 July 2011.

==== Africville Museum ====
A building designed to mimic the Seaview African United Baptist Church, demolished in 1969, was erected in the summer of 2011 to serve as a museum and historic interpretation centre. The nearly complete church was ceremonially opened on 25 September 2011. The opening ceremonies included a gospel concert, several church services, and the release of a compilation audio album with archival recordings of songs sung in Africville.

Since then, the museum has given tours of the site, put on a number of exhibits, commissioned a play about the beginnings of Africville, and organized a number of fundraisers and petitions, including to add a transit stop at and accessibility improvements to the museum. The Africville Museum continues to have problems with area use, including local residents who continue to use Seaview Park as a dog park and vandals who are putting graffiti on signs and disrupting trust efforts to identify the sites of former houses.

A civil lawsuit has been filed seeking individual compensation for property in Africville.

=== Tributes and related media ===
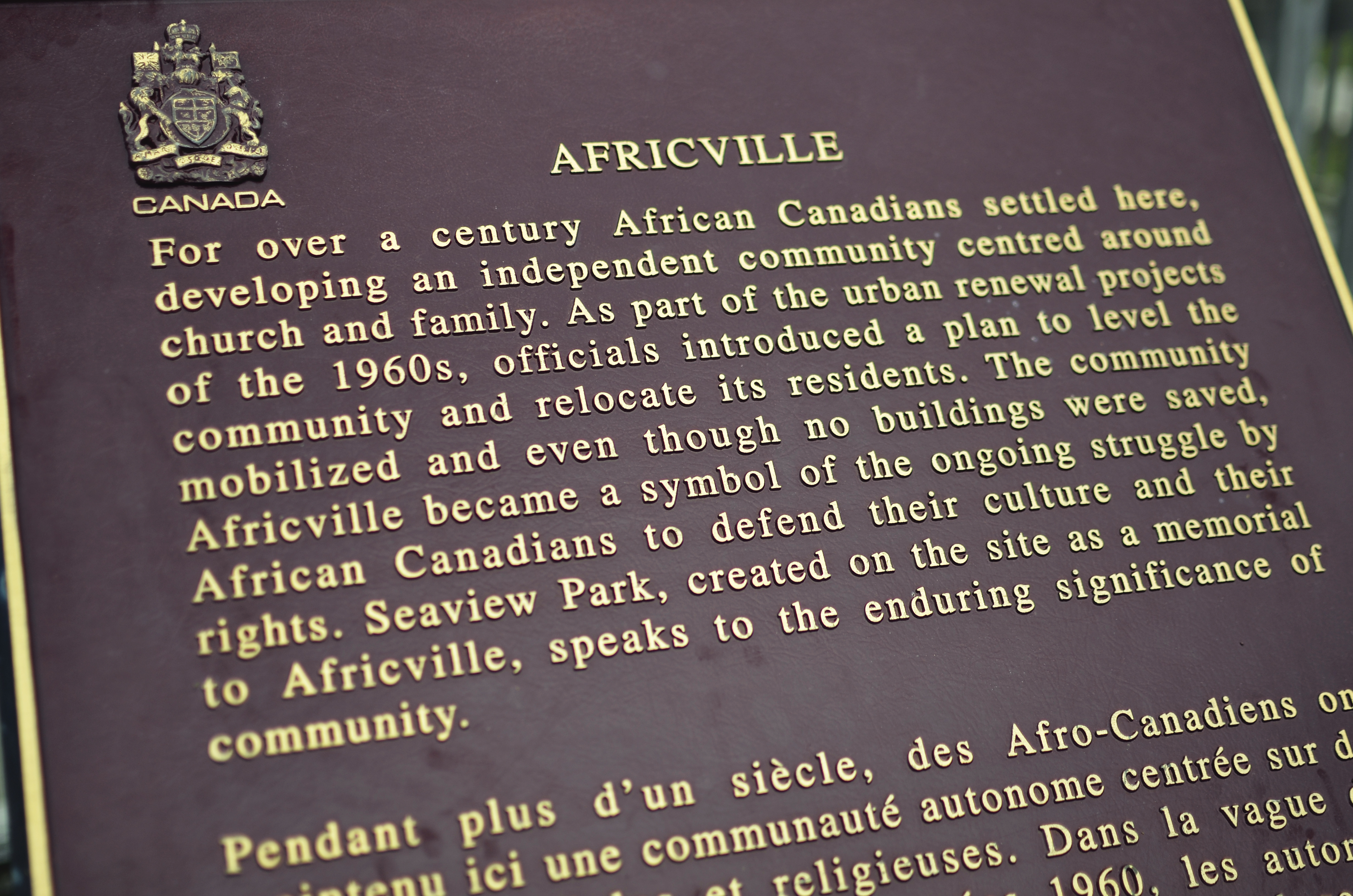
Text on the site of Africville, near the Seaview Baptist Church in Halifax, NS, Canada.

==== Music ====
- African Canadian singer/songwriter Faith Nolan released an album in 1986 titled Africville.
- Africville Suite (1996) is an album of original music, released by Montreal-born jazz pianist Joe Sealy, that includes twelve pieces reflecting on places and activities in Africville, where Sealy's father was born. Sealy worked and lived in Halifax during the time of the destruction of the community, and began the suite in memory of his father. The album won a Juno Award in 1997.
- Ain't No Thing Like a Chicken Wing (1997) is an album released by Canadian jazz pianist Trevor Mackenzie as a tribute to the neighbourhood where his father grew up.
- "A Nourishment by Neglect" (2007) is a song by Newfoundland metal/hardcore band Bucket Truck accompanied by a video that details the events surrounding the destruction of the Africville community.
- In 2007, Canadian hip-hop group Black Union released a song featuring Maestro about the historic community of Africville. The music video was recorded in Seaview Park (now Africville Park). The video has over 50,000 views on YouTube.

==== Film ====
- Remember Africville (1991) is a documentary film, released by the National Film Board of Canada, which received the Moonsnail Award for best documentary at the Atlantic Film Festival.
- Stolen From Africville (2008) is an independently produced documentary that follows the lives of those displaced from the Africville community over the course of a year. Written and directed by Canadian activist/performer Neil Donaldson (known as Logikal Ethix) and Sourav Deb, the film received funding from Heritage Canada in 2007.
- Africville: Can't Stop Now (2009), produced by Marty Williams and Juanita Peters with Africville Productions, is a documentary that presents the community that has survived despite having lost its home.

==== Literature ====
- Consecrated Ground (1998), a play by George Boyd and produced by Eastern Front Theatre, dramatized the Africville eviction. In 2000, the play was nominated for a Governor-General's award for English-Language Drama.
- Last Days in Africville (2006, Dundurn Press), by Dorothy Perkyns, is a fictional account of life for a young Africville girl at the time of the community's destruction.
- The story of Africville has influenced the work of George Elliott Clarke.
- The Children of Africville (2007), a children's book by Christine Welldon, tells the story of the children who were growing up during the communities final years, before it was destroyed and the residents were relocated. On 15 June 2009, the Rev. Jesse Jackson, a noted American civil rights activist, was presented with the book at the Nova Scotia Alliance of Black School Educators. Irvine Carvery, president of the Africville Genealogy Society and chair of the Halifax Regional School Board, made the presentation.
- The Hermit of Africville (2010, Pottersfield Press) is a biography of longtime Africville protester Eddie Carvery.
- Big Town (2011, Nimbus Publishing/Vagrant Press), a novel by Stephens Gerard Malone, is a fictional account related to the eviction of residents and the razing of Africville.
- Africville (2018) is a book by Shauntay Grant, for which the Africville Museum held a book launch for on September 13, 2018.
- Africaville (2019), an adult novel by American Jeffrey Colvin, explores the lives of three generations associated with the community, frequently referring flashbacks to earlier history.

==== Other ====
- In 1989, a historic exhibit about Africville toured across Canada. It has been developed as a permanent exhibit at Nova Scotia's Black Cultural Centre in Preston.
- In 2012, the Africville Heritage Trust created the "Out Home: Africville" Educational Resource Kit. This kit consists of teaching resources and a variety of student activities that foster empathy, cultural understanding, and a sense of empowerment as students uncover the complexities of an important story.
- In 2020, college student Danielle Mahon created the online project Mapping Memories of Africville. It exhibits public records and interviews from two former Africville residents, while tagging the sources to specific locations in an aerial view of Africville's former site.

== Notable residents ==
- Addie Aylestock – church deaconess
- Parents of Mildred Dixon – professional dancer at the Cotton Club; Dixon was born in Boston, where her parents had moved in the early 20th century
- Clara Carvery Adams – namesake of Duke Ellington's song "Clara," written in 1964 and rediscovered in 1999
- Eddie Carvery
- George Dixon (boxer)
- Ricky Anderson
- Edith Hester McDonald-Brown

== See also ==
- Jennifer Rosanne States – Nova Scotia 20th-century discrimination case
- Viola Desmond – a Nova Scotia woman who sat in a white area of a theatre
- Nova Scotia Heritage Day
- Environmental Racism in Nova Scotia
- Black Nova Scotians
- Joan Jones
