= List of people from the Halifax Regional Municipality =

This is a list of people who were born in the communities making up the Halifax Regional Municipality, Nova Scotia or spent a significant part of their lives there.

== Politicians ==
- Sir Frederick Borden KCMG PC (1847–1917), Minister of Militia and Defence (Canada) (1896-1911)
- Sir Robert Borden GCMG PC KC (1854–1937), Prime Minister of Canada (1911-20)
- John Buchanan PC, QC (1931–2019), lawyer, 20th Premier of Nova Scotia 1978–1990, member of the Senate of Canada 1990–2006
- Walter Fitzgerald (1936–2014), Mayor of Halifax, 1971–1974, 1994–1996
- John Godfrey (1942–2023), Member of Parliament (1993–2008), President of University of King's College (1977–1987), Financial Post editor (1987–1991)
- Joseph Howe (1804–1873), press freedom advocate and activist, journalist, politician and public servant
- Mary Theresa King-Myers, first female municipal councillor in rural Canada
- Megan Leslie (born 1973), former Member of Parliament and Deputy Leader of the federal New Democratic Party (2012–2015)
- Angus L. MacDonald, 12th and 14th Premier of Nova Scotia 1933–1940, 1945–1954 and federal Minister of National Defence for Naval Services, 1940–1945
- Alexa McDonough (1944–2022), former Member of Parliament and Leader of the provincial (1980-1994) and federal New Democratic Party (1995–2003)
- Gerald Regan, PC, QC (1928–2019), 19th Premier of Nova Scotia 1970–1978, federal cabinet minister 1980–1984
- Jo-Ann Roberts (born 1956), interim leader, Green Party of Canada, 2019-2020
- Sir John Sparrow David Thompson (1845–1894), Prime Minister of Canada (1892–94)
- Sir Charles Tupper (1821–1915), Prime Minister of Canada (1896)
- Ronald Wallace (1916–2008), Mayor of Halifax, 1970–1978

=== Civil rights leaders ===
- Yvonne Atwell (born 1943), MLA, community leader
- Viola Desmond (1914–1965), Afro-Nova Scotian civil and women's rights activist and businesswoman
- James Robinson Johnston (1876–1915), lawyer and community leader
- Rocky Jones (1941–2013), lawyer, civil rights leader
- William Pearly Oliver CM (1912–1989), civil rights leader
- Richard Preston (1791–1861), religious leader, abolitionist

== Business leaders ==
- David Bentley (businessman), U.K.-born publisher, editor, founder of The Daily News and Frank magazine
- William "Bill" Black, (born 1950), Canadian business leader
- Enos Collins (1774–1871), banker
- Samuel Cunard (1787–1865), steamship line founder
- William Dennis (1922–2014), CEO of Halifax Herald, Red Cross Humanitarian award
- Michael Donovan (born 1953), former CEO and current chairman of DHX Media; recipient of an Academy Award for Best Documentary
- Charles V. Keating, CM (1933–2005), cable czar
- Robert P. Kelly, former CEO of BNY Mellon
- Pete Luckett (born 1953), U.K.-born entrepreneur, vintner, specialty grocer, TV personality
- Bill Lynch (1903–1972), businessman, philanthropist, carnival showman (Bill Lynch Show)
- Alexander Keith (1795–1873), brewmaster; former mayor of the city of Halifax; first Grand Master Mason for Nova Scotia
- Charles Peter McColough (1922–2006), former chairman and CEO of the Xerox Corporation
- Sidney Culverwell Oland (1886–1977), Oland brewery owner, philanthropist
- Arnie Patterson (1928–2011), radio czar, brewery manager, former press secretary to Pierre Trudeau
- John Risley (born c. 1948), founder of Clearwater Fine Foods and Ocean Nutrition Canada
- John Fitzwilliam Stairs (1848–1904), entrepreneur and statesman
- William Machin Stairs (1789–1865), merchant, banker, and statesman

== Military and naval figures ==
=== 17th–18th centuries ===
- Charles Lawrence, Father Le Loutre's War
- Father Pierre Maillard, Father Le Loutre's War
- Captain Charles Morris, King George's War

=== 19th century ===
- John Charles Beckwith, Battle of Waterloo
- Edward Belcher was on Franklin's lost expedition
- Lieutenant-Colonel James J. Bremner, North-West Rebellion
- Jane Cecilia Deeble military nurse, was born here in 1827 and was awarded the 2nd Royal Red Cross
- Sir John Eardley Inglis, Indian Mutiny
- Clonard Keating, Lieutenant, Nigeria
- John Wimburn Laurie, Crimean War
- John Houlton Marshall, Battle of Trafalgar, Province House (Nova Scotia)
- Captain William B.C.A. Parker, Crimean War
- Sir John Coape Sherbrooke, Lieutenant Governor of Nova Scotia, War of 1812
- William Grant Stairs, Captain, the Stairs Expedition to Katanga
- Provo Wallis, War of 1812
- Major Augustus F. Welsford, Crimean War
- George Augustus Westphal, Battle of Trafalgar, Admiralty Garden, Stadacona, CFB Halifax, Nova Scotia
- Sir William Williams, 1st Baronet, of Kars by William Gush, Crimean War
- John Taylor Wood, American Civil War

=== 20th century ===
- Philip Bent, Halifax-born recipient of the Victoria Cross
- Vice Admiral Harry DeWolf, CBE, DSO, DSC, CD (1903-2000), Commander of HMCS Haida, WWII Battle of the Atlantic; Chief of the Naval Staff (1956–60)
- Francis Joseph Fitzgerald, Second Boer War, Fitzgerald Bridge in Halifax Public Gardens
- Harold Taylor Wood Grant, commanded HMS Enterprise (D52) in the Battle of the Bay of Biscay
- Mona Louise Parsons, World War II
- Guy Carleton Jones, 4th Canadian Surgeon General

== Diplomats ==
- Audri Mukhopadhyay (born 1974), former Canadian Consul General in Ho Chi Minh City, Vietnam

== Scientists ==
- Oswald Avery (1877–1955), physician and medical researcher who proved that DNA is the carrier of genetic information
- Walter A. Bell (1889–1969), geologist and paleontologist
- Elisabeth Mann Borgese (1918–2002), German-Canadian oceanographer, environmentalist, maritime lawyer, daughter of Thomas Mann
- Margaret Sibella Brown (1866-1961), bryologist
- Erik Demaine (born 1981), computer scientist and professor
- Danielle Fong (born 1987), co-founder and Chief Scientist of LightSail Energy
- Abraham Pineo Gesner (1797–1864), physician and geologist who invented kerosene
- Charles Brenton Huggins (1901–1997), Canadian-American physician and researcher, Nobel Prize Winner in Physiology or Medicine "for his discoveries concerning hormonal treatment of prostatic cancer"
- E. Elizabeth Patton, FRSE, professor of chemical genetics, Personal Chair in Melanoma Genetics and Drug Discovery, MRC Human Genetics Unit, Edinburgh
- Donald O. Hebb (1904–1985), professor of psychology who is best known for contributing Hebbian theory to the field of neuroscience, which he introduced in his classic 1949 work Organization of Behavior

== Authors ==
=== Novelists or short story authors ===
- Lisa Alward
- Kris Bertin, 2017 Danuta Gleed Award-winning author (Bad Things Happen)
- Alexander MacLeod (born 1972), short story writer (Light Lifting) and academic
- Donna Morrissey (born 1956), novelist (Kit's Law; What They Wanted) (Born in Beaches, Newfoundland and Labrador)
- Sarah Mian, novelist (When the Saints)
- Hugh MacLennan, CC, CQ (1907–1990), 5-time Governor General's Award winner (Barometer Rising, Two Solitudes, The Watch That Ends the Night)
- Georgie A. Hulse McLeod (1827–1890), author, Ivy Leaves from the Old Homestead
- Alex Pugsley (born 1963), novelist (Kay Darling, Aubrey McKee), screenwriter/director (Dirty Singles), tv writer
- Thomas Head Raddall (1903–1994), novelist (Roger Sudden; Halifax, Warden of the North)
- Russell Smith (born 1963), novelist (How Insensitive, Muriella Pent), columnist

=== Playwrights ===
- Catherine Banks, 2-time Governor General's Award-winning playwright (Bone Cage; It Is Solved By Walking)
- George Boyd (playwright) (1952–2020) (Shine Boy; Gideon's Blues)
- Brendan Gall (born 1978) (Alias Godot; Head-Smashed-In, Buffalo Jump)
- Hannah Moscovitch (born 1978) Ottawa-born Governor General's Award-winning playwright (East of Berlin, This is War, Sexual Misconduct of the Middle Classes)
- Wendy Lill (born 1950), playwright, M.P. (Corker, The Fighting Days, The Glace Bay Miners' Museum)
- Alfred Silver, Prairie-born Halifax playwright, novelist (Göttingen, Acadia)

=== Poets ===
- Bill Bissett (born 1939), poet (Th gossamer bed pan, Th Wind Up Tongue, sublingual)
- Charles Tory Bruce (1906–1971), Governor General's Award-winning poet, novelist, journalist (The Mulgrave Road, The Channel Shore)
- Lesley Choyce (born 1951), U.S.-born poet (Revenge of the Optimist), novelist, academic, publisher (Pottersfield Portfolio/Press)
- George Elliott Clarke OC ONS (born 1960), Governor General's Award-winning poet, playwright, novelist, academic (Execution Poems, Illicit Sonnets)
- Afua Cooper (born 1957), Jamaican-Canadian poet and academic (Breaking Chains, Copper Woman, Memories Have Tongue)
- Don Domanski (1950–2020), Governor General's Award-winner (All of Our Wonder Unavenged, The Cape Breton Book of the Dead, Stations of The Left Hand)
- Susan Goyette (born 1964), poet (The True Names of Birds, Lures, The Brief Reincarnation of a Girl)
- Amelia Clotilda Jennings (died 1895), poet, novelist (Linden Rhymes, The White Rose in Acadia)
- El Jones, poet, academic, activist (Live from the Afrikan Resistance!)
- Kenneth Leslie (1892–1974), Governor General's Award-winner (O'Malley to the Reds, By Stubborn Stars), progressive activist and editor (The Protestant Digest)
- Annick MacAskill, Governor General's Award-winner (Shadow Blight)
- Lorri Neilsen Glenn, poet, essayist, academic (Lost Gospels, Threading Light, Salt Lines, Saved String)
- The Song Fishermen (1928–1930), poetry collective
- Joe Wallace (1890–1975), poet, journalist, labour activist, political prisoner (All My Brothers, A Radiant Sphere, Night is Ended)
- Tanya Davis, spoken word poet and singer

=== Critics, scholars, other ===
- John Boileau (born 1794), author of historical non-fiction (Half-Hearted Enemies: Nova Scotia, New England and the War of 1812, Valiant Hearts: Atlantic Canada and the Victoria Cross, Halifax and the Royal Canadian Navy, Halifax and Titanic, 6-12-17: The Halifax Explosion)
- Harry Flemming (1933-2008), journalist, columnist, political pundit
- George Grant (philosopher) (1918–1988), philosopher, academic (Lament for a Nation, Technology and Empire)
- Stephen Kimber (born 1949), journalist, editor, broadcaster, professor (Sailors, Slackers and Blind Pigs: Halifax at War)
- Janet Kitz, ONS, MSM, (1930–2019), author, educator, historian (Shattered City)
- Steven Laffoley (born 1965), creative non-fiction and crime writer (Halifax Nocturne)
- Thomas McCulloch (1776–1843), Scottish-born clergyman, naturalist, humourist, author (The Stepsure Letters)
- Walter D. O'Hearn (1910–1969), newspaper journalist, managing editor, columnist, book reviewer (The New York Times), President of the United Nations Correspondents Association
- Malcolm Ross (literary critic) OC FRSC (1911–2002), critic (Poetry & Dogma), editor (McClelland and Stewart's New Canadian Library), professor, NFB film executive

== Actors, directors, comedians ==
=== Actors ===
- Walter Borden (born 1942), Shakespearian stage, TV and film actor (King Lear, Tightrope Time, Gerontophilia)
- Henry Beckman (1921–2008), stage, film, and television actor (McHale's Navy, Why Rock the Boat?)
- Chuck Campbell (born 1969), actor (Stargate Atlantis)
- Josephine Crowell (1859–1932), actor (The Birth of a Nation, Hot Water)
- John Dunsworth (1946–2017), actor (Trailer Park Boys)
- Peter Flemming (born 1967), actor (Stargate Atlantis)
- Eli Goree (born 1994), actor, (The 100, Ballers, One Night in Miami...)
- Harry Hayden (1882–1955), actor (Two Against the World, Hail the Conquering Hero)
- Tamara Hickey, actress (The Associates, Blue Murder)
- Leslie Hope (born 1965), actress (Talk Radio; Paris, France; 24)
- Michael Jackson (born 1970), actor (Trailer Park Boys), musician (a.k.a. Doug Mason)
- Ruby Keeler (1909–1993), actress, dancer (42nd Street, Gold Diggers of 1933, Footlight Parade, Dames)
- Steve Lund (born 1989), actor
- David Manners (1900–1998), actor (Kismet, Browning's Dracula, Freund's The Mummy, The Moonstone)
- Forbes March (born 1973), actor born in UK but raised in Halifax (All My Children, As the World Turns, One Life to Live)
- Peter North (born 1957), adult film actor, director, producer (North Poles)
- Sonja O'Hara (born 1987), actress, director (Root Letter)
- Craig Olejnik (born 1979), actor, (Margaret's Museum, The Listener)
- Ty Olsson (born 1974), actor (Kingdom Hospital)
- Elliot Page (born 1987), Academy Award-nominated actor (Juno, Inception, To Rome with Love, Into the Forest)
- John Reardon (born 1975), actor and former university football player (Hudson & Rex)
- Laura Regan (born 1977), actress (Mad Men)
- Joanna Shimkus (born 1943), actress (Boom!, The Virgin and the Gypsy, A Time for Loving)
- Cindy Sampson (born 1978), actress (Private Eyes)
- Anthony Sherwood (born 1949), actor, producer, director, writer, and R&B singer (Street Legal)
- Chase Tang (born 1988), actor Jupiter's Legacy, Slasher
- Jonathan Torrens (born 1972), actor (Trailer Park Boys, Mr. D), television personality (TV with TV's Jonathan Torrens)
- John Paul Tremblay (born 1968), actor and writer (Trailer Park Boys)
- Robb Wells (born 1971), actor and writer (Trailer Park Boys, Hobo With a Shotgun)
- Austin Willis (1917–2004) actor (Goldfinger, The Rat Patrol), TV host (This Is The Law)

[Note: UK actors John Neville (1925–2011) and Noel Harrison (1934–2013) and US actors Michael Moriarty (born 1941) and Jan Smithers (born 1949) are all former extended-term residents of Halifax]

=== Directors/screenwriters ===
- Rob Boutilier (born 1971), cartoonist, born in Halifax
- Cory Bowles (born 1973), actor (Trailer Park Boys), writer, director (Black Cop)
- Mike Clattenburg (born 1968), TV and film director, creator of the Trailer Park Boys
- Paul Donovan, TV and film writer/director, creator of 'LEXX'
- Barrie Dunn (born 1952), actor (Trailer Park Boys), writer (Canada Russia '72), director, producer, lawyer
- Jason Eisener, director (Hobo with a Shotgun)
- Thom Fitzgerald (born 1968), director, writer (The Hanging Garden, Cloudburst, 3 Needles, Wild Dogs)
- Floyd Kane, lawyer, creator of Diggstown
- Noah Pink, screenwriter, television producer, director, swimmer
- Ben Proudfoot (born 1990), filmmaker, two time recipient of the Academy Award for Best Documentary Short Film
- Karen Walton, screenwriter (Ginger Snaps, Orphan Black)

=== Comedians ===
- Jackie Cox, Drag Queen (RuPaul’s Drag Race)
- Mark Farrell (born 1968), comedian, writer, producer, actor (The Newsroom)
- Ron James, Glace Bay-raised Halifax-based comedian, actor
- Nikki Payne (born 1976), comedian
- Picnicface, comedy troupe
- The Unknown Comic, real name Murray Langston (born 1945), actor, comedian
- Cheryl Wagner, clown and puppeteer
- Jennifer Whalen, Toronto-raised Halifax-resident writer, actor (Baroness von Sketch Show, This Hour Has 22 Minutes)

== Broadcasters ==
- Steve Armitage (born 1944), sportscaster
- Frank Cameron (1938–2024), CBC anchorman, DJ, columnist, Music Hop host (Frank's Bandstand)
- Peter Coade (1942-2025), broadcast meteorologist
- Gerry Fogarty, CBC sportscaster, quizmaster (Reach for the Top), politician, MLA, Speaker of the Nova Scotia House of Assembly
- Robert MacNeil (1931–2024), former PBS anchorman (The MacNeil-Lehrer Report)
- Bruce Rainnie, sportscaster, anchorman
- Perry F. Rockwood (1917–2008), radio evangelist
- Tara Slone (born 1973), host Rogers Hometown Hockey, singer, actress

== Visual artists and sculptors ==
- Bob Chambers, (1905–1996), political cartoonist
- Joey Comeau (born 1980), author and co-creator of the webcomic A Softer World
- Gerald Ferguson, artist
- Tom Forrestall, CM, ONS (1936-2024), painter
- Hal Foster (1892–1982), comic book artist
- Alice Mary Hagen (1872–1972), Canadian ceramic artist
- Sarah Jeanette Jackson, artist
- Ursula Johnson (born 1980), multidisciplinary Mi'kmaq artist
- Garry Neill Kennedy, artist, NSCAD University president 1967–1996, recipient of the Order of Canada award
- George Lang (builder) (1821–1881), sculptor, stonemason (Sebastopol Monument, Art Gallery of Nova Scotia, Halifax Provincial Court (Spring Garden Road))
- Ernest Lawson (1873–1939), artist
- Owen McCarron (1929–2005), cartoonist
- John O'Brien (marine artist) (1831–1891), painter
- George Steeves (born 1945), contemporary photographer
- William Valentine (1798–1849), painter
- Marguerite Porter Zwicker (1904–1993), painter and art promoter
- Bruce MacKinnon, political cartoonist and musician

== Musicians ==
=== Classical ===
- Denise Djokic (born 1980), cellist
- Barbara Fris (born 1956), operatic soprano
- Barbara Hannigan (born 1971), operatic soprano
- James Milligan (1928–1961), opera singer
- Don Ross (guitarist) (born 1960), fingerstyle classical, jazz and folk guitarist
- Georg Tintner (1917–1999), Austrian-born conductor; resident of Halifax from 1987 until his death
- Portia White (1911–1968), operatic contralto

=== Country ===
- Brian Ahern, music producer
- Ridley Bent (born 1979), country singer songwriter
- The Guthries (country-rock band), active from 1998–2002
- Eddy (M) Melanson, 1950s rockabilly singer
- Hank Snow (1914–1999), country music artist born in Brooklyn, Queens County, Nova Scotia; career started in Halifax
- Gordon Stobbe (born 1946), fiddler, TV host
- Jason Price, country singer/songwriter (current)

=== Folk ===
- Ben Caplan, folk musician
- Melanie Doane (born 1967), singer-songwriter
- Rose Cousins (born 1977), singer-songwriter
- Denny Doherty (1940–2007), singer-songwriter, a founding member of The Mamas & the Papas
- Luke Doucet (born 1973), singer-songwriter
- Jenn Grant (born 1980), singer-songwriter
- Dylan Guthro (born 1991), singer-songwriter from Cape Breton, now based in Halifax
- The Halifax Three, 1960s folk group
- Rebekah Higgs (born 1982), singer-songwriter
- Mo Kenney (born 1990), singer-songwriter
- Daniel Ledwell, record producer and multi-instrumentalist
- Ryan MacGrath, singer-songwriter
- Robbie MacNeill, singer-songwriter, guitarist
- Ed McCurdy (1919–2000), American singer-songwriter, peace activist lived in Halifax from 1984-2000
- Ruth Minnikin, singer-songwriter
- Old Man Luedecke, Juno winning singer-songwriter
- Denis Ryan, Irish-Canadian singer and tin whistler, based in Halifax since 1980
- The Stanfields, folk rock band
- Al Tuck (born 1966), singer-songwriter from Prince Edward Island, based in Halifax since 1980s

=== Jazz, blues, and soul ===
- Bucky Adams (1937–2012), jazz and blues saxophonist
- Jill Barber (born 1980), Halifax-based singer-songwriter
- Gary Beals (born 1982), singer
- Holly Cole (born 1963), singer, actor
- Jerry Granelli (1940-2021), drummer (Vince Guaraldi Trio)
- Gypsophilia (formed 2004), jazz band
- JRDN (Ralph Jordon Croucher), R&B recording artist
- Dutch Mason (1938–2006), blues hollerer, singer, jazz musician and Order of Canada inductee ("Prime Minister of the Blues")
- Joe Sealy (born 1939), pianist, composer (Africville Suite)
- Nelson Symonds (1933–2008), jazz guitarist
- Jody Upshaw (born 2003), R&B/pop artist

=== Hip hop and rap ===
- Buck 65 (born 1972), rapper, hip hop artist, MC, CBC personality Rich Terfry
- Classified, real name Luke Boyd, rapper from Enfield
- Hip Club Groove, 1990s hip hop band
- Sixtoo, 1990s hip hop artist
- Skratch Bastid (born 1982), Bedford-raised deejay, producer, 3-time Scribble Jam DJ Battle winner
- Pat Stay (1986-2022), battle rapper, hip hop artist
- Wordburglar, alternative hip hop artist

=== Rock and pop ===
==== Individuals ====
- Rich Aucoin, indie-rock musician
- Adam Baldwin (singer), singer-songwriter
- Rob Benvie, guitarist, singer-songwriter, novelist
- Jon Bryant, singer-songwriter
- Brendan Croskerry (born 1985), singer-songwriter, multi-instrumentalist
- Matthew Grimson (1968–2018), singer-songwriter
- Myles Goodwyn (1948–2023), singer-songwriter, producer, April Wine and solo
- Ryan Hemsworth, DJ and producer
- Ria Mae, singer-songwriter
- Matt Mays (born 1979), singer-songwriter (solo and with El Torpedo)
- Sarah McLachlan (born 1968), singer-songwriter, pianist
- Kevin MacMichael (1951–2002), Cutting Crew guitarist
- Matt Murphy, singer-songwriter, guitarist, actor (The Life and Hard Times of Guy Terrifico)
- Dale Murray, musician, guitarist and vocalist for Cuff the Duke
- Joel Plaskett (born 1974), singer-songwriter

==== Bands ====
- Alert the Medic (formed 2006), rock band
- April Wine (band), formed in 1969
- Dog Day (formed 2004), indie-rock duo
- The Flashing Lights, indie rock band 1990s–2000s
- The Hylozoists (formed 2001), instrumental rock group
- In-Flight Safety (formed in 2003), indie-rock band originally from Sackville
- Jale (band), formed in 1992
- Jellyfishbabies, indie rock band, 1986-1993
- Mir, alternative band, 1998–2010
- Neon Dreams (band), Alt-Pop Duo (formed 2013)
- North of America (1997–2003), indie-rock band
- Plumtree indie rock band, formed in 1993
- Port Cities (band formed in 2015)
- Sloan (band), formed in 1991
- The Stolen Minks (formed in 2003), garage-punk band
- The Super Friendz, indie rock band, 1994–1997, 2003–2004
- Thrush Hermit, 90s alternative rock band
- Tuns (band), indie supergroup featuring Sloan and Super Friendz members
- TWRP (band), 80s electro synthesizer rock band, formed in 2007
- Wintersleep (band), formed in 2001

== Sportspeople ==
=== Baseball ===
- Shorty Dee (1889–1971), MLB shortstop, St. Louis Browns
- John Doyle (baseball) (1858–1915), MLB pitcher, St. Louis Brown Stockings
- Pat Hannivan (1866–1908), MLB outfielder/infielder, Brooklyn Bridegrooms
- Vince Horsman (born 1967), MLB pitcher, Oakland A's, Toronto Blue Jays
- Rick Lisi (born 1956), MLB outfielder, Texas Rangers
- Pat Scanlon (outfielder) (1861–1913), MLB outfielder, Boston Reds

=== Basketball ===
- Lindell Wigginton (born 1998), basketball player, Milwaukee Bucks, Wisconsin Herd
- Nate Darling (born 1998), basketball player for the Charlotte Hornets, Ontario Clippers

=== Boxing ===
- Ricky Anderson, 1981 North American light-welterweight champion
- Trevor Berbick (1954–2006), WBC World Heavyweight Champion (1986)
- Chris Clarke (born 1956), 1975 Pan Am Games lightweight gold-medalist
- Buddy Daye (1928–1995), Canadian featherweight champion 1964-66, community activist
- David Downey (born 1942), Canadian middleweight champion 1967–77
- Ray Downey (born 1968), Olympic medalist, light-heavyweight
- George Dixon (1870–1908), first black world boxing champion in any weight class; first ever Canadian-born boxing champion
- Clyde Gray (born 1947), Commonwealth Champion, WBA welterweight contender
- Ralph Hollett (1952-2012), Canadian middleweight champion
- Kirk Johnson (born 1972), heavyweight boxer, Olympian

=== Football ===
- Eddie Murray, (born 1956) former NFL Kicker
- Tyrone Williams (born 1970), retired NFL and CFL player
- Steve Morley (born 1981), retired NFL and CFL player
- Larry Uteck (1952–2002), CFL player (1974–80), CIAU coach (1983–97) [Coach of the Year (1988, 1992)], athletic director, Alderman, Deputy Mayor

=== Hockey ===
- Justin Barron (born 2001), NHL player, Nashville Predators
- Morgan Barron (born 1998), NHL player, Winnipeg Jets
- Eric Boulton (born 1976), former NHL hockey player (2000–2015)
- Rick Bowness (born 1955), head coach of various NHL teams (1988–2004), Dallas Stars (2019–2022), Winnipeg Jets (2022–2024), Columbus Blue Jackets (2026–present)
- Mike Backman (born 1955), former NHL and CHL player (1976–1986)
- Sidney Crosby (born 1987), 3-time Stanley Cup champion, Olympic gold medalist, Conn Smythe (2), Art Ross (2), Hart (2) trophies winner
- Gord Dwyer, NHL referee
- Ryan Flinn (born 1980), former NHL enforcer (2001-06)
- Andrew Gordon (born 1985), AHL, NHL (2008–2013), and SHL (Swedish Hockey League) player
- Hilliard Graves (born 1950), former NHL and WHA player (1970–1980)
- Luke Henman (born 2000), Seattle Kraken, Coachella Valley Firebirds
- Matthew Highmore (born 1996), NHL player for the New York Islanders
- Bert Hirschfeld (1929–1996), former NHL player (1949–1951)
- Jack Ingram (1893–1957), former professional hockey player (NHL, 1924–1925)
- Don Johnson (1930–2012), president of the Canadian Amateur Hockey Association and civil servant
- Mike Johnston (born 1957), head coach and GM, Portland Winterhawks; former Pittsburgh Penguins head coach (2014–2016)
- Andrew Joudrey (born 1984), NHL (2004) and DEL Deutsche Eishockey Liga hockey player
- Don Koharski (born 1955), former NHL referee
- Alex Killorn (born 1989), Anaheim Ducks forward, 2012 Calder Cup winner (Norfolk Admirals), 2-time Stanley Cup champion
- Olaf Kolzig (born 1970), former NHL goalie (1989–2009), played minor NSAHA/NSMMHL hockey in Dartmouth (1985–1987)
- David Ling (born 1975), former NHL player (1996–2004)
- Nathan MacKinnon (born 1995), Stanley Cup champion, first overall pick in 2013 NHL entry draft 2012 QMJHL rookie of year and Halifax Mooseheads, Maurice 'Rocket' Richard Trophy winner
- Ian MacNeil, former NHL player (2002–2003)
- Brad Marchand (born 1988), NHL player for the Florida Panthers, won Stanley Cup in 2011 and 2025
- Peter Marsh (born 1956), retired NHL player
- Wayne Maxner (1942–2023), former NHL player (1964–1966), NHL coach Detroit Red Wings (1980–1982)
- Liam O'Brien, hockey player, Utah Mammoth
- Pokey Reddick (born 1964), former NHL goalie (1986–1994)
- Cam Russell (born 1969), former NHL player (1989–1999)
- James Sheppard (born 1988), former NHL player (2007–2015) and DEL Deutsche Eishockey Liga hockey player
- Wendell Young (born 1963), former NHL (1985–1995) and IHL/CHL goalie (1981–2001)
- Shane Bowers (born 1999), AHL player (2019-present), one NHL game in 2022 before returning to the AHL, and played in the NSMMHL.
- Jill Saulnier (born 1992), Olympic gold and silver medalist, professional women's hockey forward for the Boston Fleet in the PWHL, previously played for Les Canadiennes de Montréal and Calgary Inferno

=== Martial arts ===
- T. J. Grant (born 1984), mixed martial artist, UFC Lightweight contender
- Roger Hollett, mixed martial artist, former UFC Light Heavyweight
- Chris Kelades, mixed martial artist, former UFC Flyweight
- John Makdessi, mixed martial artist, UFC Lightweight competitor

=== Other ===
- Janet Gladys Aitken (1908–1988), equestrian and former director of the All England Jumping Course at Hickstead
- Jackie Barrett (born 1974), Special Olympics Powerlifter, amassed 15 Powerlifting medals at four Special Olympics World Games appearances
- Bobby Bass (wrestler) (born 1947), professional wrestler
- Ellie Black (born 1995), Olympic gymnast
- Jamie Bone (born 1966), 3-time gold medallist, 1988 Summer Paralympics (100m, 200m, 400m)
- Jillian D'Alessio (born 1985), sprint kayaker, two-time Pan-American gold medalist
- Nancy Garapick (1961-2026), backstroke swimmer, Olympic medalist and former Olympic record holder, former world record holder
- Stephen Giles (born 1972), sprint canoeist, World Champion (1998), Olympic bronze-medallist (2000)
- Stephen Hart (born 1960), former soccer player, national team manager (Canada, 2006–07, 2009–12; Trinidad and Tobago, 2013–16), manager of the Halifax Wanderers (CPL) (2018–22), Halifax Tides FC (2025-).
- Colleen Jones (1959-2025), World Champion curler, CBC personality
- Mark de Jonge (born 1984), sprint canoeist, olympic bronze medalist, two World Championship golds and one Pan-American gold
- Ian Millar (born 1947), Equestrian show jumper, World Champ (3), 10-time Olympian (1972-2012), Olympic silver medallist (2008), Pan Am Champ (1987, 1999, 2015)
- Morgan Williams, professional rugby player, born in Kingston, Ontario, raised in Cole Harbour

== Criminals ==
- Alexander Keith, Jr. (1827–1875), American Civil War secret agent, saboteur, terrorist, mass killer
- John Tillmann (1961–2018), art thief, fraudster

== Other ==
- John Henry Barnstead, registrar and coroner in charge of the Titanic disaster; creator of the Barnstead Method
- Eddie Carvery (1946-2026), Africville political protestor
- Helen Creighton CM (1899–1989), folklorist
- Patrick Vincent (Vince) Coleman, Halifax Explosion hero
- Adèle Hugo, French national, subject of The Story of Adèle H., Halifax resident 1863–1866, (daughter of Victor Hugo)
- Chögyam Trungpa, Buddhist teacher
- Nick Eh 30, Twitch streamer and professional gamer
