= List of Christian denominations in Malawi =

List of Christian denominations in the Republic of Malawi, Africa.

== List ==
- Africa Continent Mission (ACM)
- Africa Light Church
- African Abraham Church
- African Assemblies of God, now Cross Life Church.
- African Baptist Assembly of Malawi, Inc.
- African Emmanuel's Church
- Africa Evangelical Church
- African International Church
- African Methodist Episcopal Church
- African Mother Church
- Agape Life Church International (ALCI)
- International Worship Centre (IWC)
- All for Jesus Church
- Anglicanism; Church of the Province of Central Africa
- The Apostolic Church of Great Britain in Malawi
- Assemblies of God
- Baptist Convention
- Bible Believers
- Bible Faith Church
- Bible Methodist Church
- Blackman's Presbyterian Church of Africa
- Catholic Church
- Calvary Family Church
- Channels of Revival Ministries (Charem)
- Charismatic Redeemed Ministries International
- Chipangano Cha Yehova
- Chipangano Church
- Christ Citadel International Church
- Christadelphians
- The Christian Apostolic Church in City Zion of Malawi (Ziyoni City)
- Christian Community Church
- Church of Central Africa, Presbyterian
- Church of Christ
- The Church of Jesus Christ of Latter-day Saints
- Church of the Nazarene
- The Church Of Pentecost Malawi
- Continuing Church of God
- Cornerstone Redeemed Church (CRC)
- Cross Life Church
- Deeper Life Bible Church (The Deeper Christian Life Ministry)
- Divine Restoration International Church
- Enlightened Christian Gathering (Shepherd Bushiri)
- Evangelical Baptist Church
- Evangelical Church of Malawi/Nyasaland
- Evangelical Lutheran Church of Malawi (ELCM)
- Evangelical Presbyterian Church of Malawi
- Evangelical Truth Church
- Evangelistic New Exodus church of God and Mission
- Faith Assembly
- Faith of God Church
- Forward in Faith Church
- Free Baptist Church
- Free Church
- Free Methodist Church
- Full Gospel Church Of God Malawi
- Glory Zone Ministry
- Good News Mission Church
- Good Samaritan Pentecostal Church
- Gospel Assembly Church
- Glorious Ministry International Church
- Hermon Temple Church
- Holy Cross
- International Fellowship of Christian Assemblies (Pentecostal Revival Church)
- Jehovah's Witnesses (Mboni Za Yehova)
- Jesus Followers
- Jesus Pentecostal Church International
- Kalibu kwa Jesu
- Kingdom Gospel Church
- Last Church of God and his Christ
- Life Changers International Church
- Living Christian Church
- Living Family Church Ministries
- Living Promise Church
- Living Waters
- Loyalty House International (formerly Lighthouse Chapel International )
- Lutheran Church of Central Africa Malawi Synod
- Malamulo Church
- Monrovia Church
- Mt. Beula Apostolic Church
- New Exodus Church of God and Missions
- New/United Apostolic Faith Church
- Peace with God Worldwide International
- Pentecostal Assemblies of Malawi
- Pentecostal Christian Church (PCC) under Pentecostal Christian Ministries
- Pentecostal Church
- Pentecostal Holiness Church (under International Pentecostal Holiness Church)
- Pentecostal Pillar of fire Ministries
- Power of Reformation Church (PRC)
- Powerline Pentecost Church (PPC)
- Providence Industrial Mission (PIM)
- Raised For a Purpose Ministries (RFP)
- Reformed Presbyterian Church of Malawi
- Revival Christian Church (peace ministries church)
- Righteousness Christian church
- Royal Priesthood Ministries International
- Salvation Army
- Seventh-day Adventist Church
- Seventh Day Baptists
- Step To Jesus church and Ministries International
- Sons of God
- United Methodist Church
- United Pentecostal Church of Malawi-(UPC)
- Vineyard Church International
- The Way church Blantyre Malawi
- Winners Chapel
- Word Alive Ministries International
- Word of Faith Temple International Bible Faith Church
- Word of Faith temple International Ministries
- Word of Life Tabernacle Church
- Worldwide Church of God
- World Revival Ministries
- Zambezi Evangelical Church
- ZAOGA
- Zion City Church
- Finish Line MInistries of Malawi

== Sources ==
City of Revival Church

Rebirth international Ministries

Family Gathering Church

- This list is based on field research carried out by the Centre for Social Research (CSR) at the University of Malawi.
