= African Baptist Assembly of Malawi, Inc. =

Christian denomination in Malawi

African Baptist Assembly of Malawi
- Classification: Evangelical Christianity
- Theology: Baptist
- Associations: Baptist World Alliance
- Headquarters: Chilembwe, Malawi
- Origin: 1945
- Congregations: 800
- Members: 72,000

The African Baptist Assembly of Malawi is a Baptist Christian denomination in Malawi. It is affiliated with the Baptist World Alliance. The headquarters is in Chilembwe.

== History ==
The African Baptist Assembly of Malawi has its origins in an Australian mission of Joseph Booth, with the Zambezi Industrial Mission in 1892, which he convinced British Baptists to help finance. He was also involved in the Nyaza Industrial Mission (1893) and the Baptist Industrial Mission (1895). In 1897, Booth took Yao tribesman John Chilembwe (ca.1871-1915) to America, where the National Baptist Convention, USA sponsored his education at the Virginia Theological Seminary and College at Lynchburg, Virginia. In 1900 Chilembwe returned to Africa under the banner of the National Baptist Convention, USA and established the Providence Industrial Mission. After Chilembwe was killed on February 4, 1915, while leading an uprising against British authority, the government banned the Providence Mission. Today the nation of Malawi regards and honors Chilembwe as a martyr. His face appears on the 200 Kwacha (Malawian currency).

In 1926, the British government allowed the Providence Industrial Mission to be reopened under Daniel Sharpe Malekebu (ca.1890-1978). Malekbu had been trained in medical and Bible school in the United States. In 1945, he led Baptists to form the National Baptist Assembly of Africa, Nyasaland. This group has experienced two divisions, resulting in the formation of the African United Baptist Church (1946) and the Independent Baptist Church (1971).

According to a census published by the association in 2023, it claimed 800 churches and 72,000 members.

== See also ==
- Bible
- Born again
- Jesus Christ
- Believers' Church
- List of Christian denominations in Malawi
