= Rialto Holocaust writing assignment =

Assignment on if the Holocaust occurred

In April 2014, an eighth grade (13–14 years old) writing assignment controversially asked students of the Rialto Unified School District in San Bernardino County, California, U.S., to write argumentative essays about whether the Holocaust actually took place, treating doubt about or denial of the Holocaust as a position students could legitimately defend. Roughly 2,000 public school students received a writing prompt that offered a binary choice: either "the Holocaust was an actual event in history, or merely a political scheme created to influence public emotion and gain wealth". The district supplied three printed handouts as sources: entries from History.com and About.com, and material from BibleBelievers.org.au, a Holocaust denial website that called The Diary of Anne Frank a forgery and the gas chambers a hoax.

A team of eighth-grade language arts teachers had written the assignment in December 2013 to accompany the district's unit on Frank's The Diary of a Young Girl, and it cleared the district's Educational Services Department before being handed out in April 2014. The San Bernardino Sun broke the story on May 4, 2014. Over the next few days Jewish organizations and California state legislators condemned the prompt. The district at first called it a critical thinking exercise consistent with Common Core. At an emergency board meeting on the evening of May 7, after a closed session, the school board withdrew the assignment and apologized. A follow-up by the Sun two months later reported that at least 50 of the essays denied or doubted the Holocaust, contradicting the district's earlier statement that none had.

== Assignment ==
The assignment was an eighth-grade argumentative essay that the Rialto Unified School District in Rialto, California, gave to roughly 2,000 students in April 2014. A team of the district's eighth-grade language arts teachers wrote it in December 2013 to accompany the district's unit on The Diary of a Young Girl. The resulting 18-page packet was routed through the district's Educational Services Department before being handed out in April 2014 as a graded in-class essay. The teachers' names were never publicly released.

The packet instructed students:

When tragic events occur in history, there is often debate about their actual existence. For example, some people claim the Holocaust is not an actual historical event, but instead is a propaganda tool that was used for political and monetary gain. Based upon your research on this issue, write an argumentative essay, utilizing cited textual evidence, in which you explain whether or not you believe the Holocaust was an actual event in history, or merely a political scheme created to influence public emotion and gain wealth. Remember to address counterclaims (rebuttals) to your stated claim.

Students were further instructed to "use parenthetical (internal) citations and [...] provide a Works Cited page".

Students were directed to base their essays on three printed handouts the teachers had selected: a History.com entry on the Holocaust, an article from About.com, and material from BibleBelievers.org.au, an Australian website that hosts Holocaust denial material. The BibleBelievers material claimed that The Diary of Anne Frank was a fake, that the bodies at Auschwitz had been those of murdered Germans rather than Jews, and that there were "compelling reasons why the so-called Holocaust never happened". The wording of the prompt, "merely a political scheme created to influence public emotion and gain wealth", closely echoed that source. Several student essays later reproduced the phrasing almost word-for-word.

== District response ==
District spokeswoman Syeda Jafri at first defended the prompt as a critical thinking exercise and said no parents had complained before The San Bernardino Sun reported on the assignment. School board member Joe Martinez offered a similar defense, emphasizing that critical thinking and articulate argument are essential to citizenship, and that teaching this is consistent with Common Core educational standards. Interim superintendent Mohammad Z. Islam said the prompt had been meant to exercise critical thinking and that there had been "no offensive intent in the crafting of this assignment", and that the district's Educational Services Department would strike any references to the Holocaust "not occurring" from current or future research assignments. Jafri said that superintendent Islam was unaware of the assignment's topic until after the district was contacted about it. As the story spread, Jafri told CBS News, "We are striking the sentence that claims, 'Did the Holocaust occur?' Absolutely the Holocaust occurred. It was an error and we have to correct it."

== Public reaction ==
The Anti-Defamation League (ADL) was among the first organizations to respond. Matthew Friedman, associate regional director of the ADL's Pacific Southwest Region, contacted the district on May 2, 2014, and said that "an exercise asking students to question whether the Holocaust happened has no academic value, it only gives legitimacy to the hateful and anti-Semitic promoters of Holocaust Denial". Friedman also warned that students looking into the topic on their own would find Holocaust denial sites that "look very slick and very persuasive, but are really bad history and propaganda for anti-Semites".

The Simon Wiesenthal Center also intervened. Associate dean Rabbi Abraham Cooper called the Holocaust "the most documented crime in human history" and said it was "difficult to conceive that there would be such a phenomenon as Holocaust Denial". Cooper and the center's historian Harold Brackman co-wrote an opinion piece in the Los Angeles Times arguing that what was at stake was not only the truth of the Holocaust but the use of pseudo-debate to legitimize denial. The World Jewish Congress and the Southern Poverty Law Center's Hatewatch blog also condemned the prompt, as did Rabbi Suzanne Singer of Temple Beth El in Riverside.

California state senator Marty Block, chair of the California Legislative Jewish Caucus, called it "abhorrent" that students were being asked to question whether the Holocaust occurred, and said the assignment trivialized "a painful and despicable episode in human history". State senator Norma Torres, whose district included Rialto, said, "Hate has no place in Rialto. Hate has no place in our classrooms." Assemblymember Cheryl Brown also condemned the assignment. California education officials publicly called the prompt "horribly inappropriate".

As the story spread, interim superintendent Islam and district spokeswoman Jafri began receiving recorded death threats, and Rialto police stationed officers at district buildings. Police captain Randy De Anda told reporters the calls had been traced to a 47-year-old man in Connecticut who had read about the assignment on social media.

== Aftermath ==
The district said on May 5 the assignment would be revised. At an emergency board meeting on the evening of May 7, after a closed session, the school board withdrew it entirely. Board president Joanne Gilbert read a statement:

The board and staff are deeply sorry for the hurt and propagation of misinformation caused by this assignment. There was no intent to be hurtful, but due to a lack of critical thought and a lack of internal checks and balances, this project commenced and turned into a horribly inappropriate assignment.

The district refused to identify the teachers who had written the assignment and would not say whether any of them would be disciplined. In response to the controversy, the district had all eighth-graders who received the prompt spend three hours at the Museum of Tolerance in Los Angeles before their June 6 graduation, and district teachers went through Holocaust education training that fall, including an Echoes and Reflections workshop at the USC Shoah Foundation in October.

In July, Beau Yarbrough and Grace Wong of the Sun obtained the essays through a California Public Records Act request and reviewed them. They identified at least 50 essays that denied or doubted the Holocaust, contradicting the district's earlier statement that no student had reached that conclusion. Some of those essays lifted arguments directly from BibleBelievers.org.au and the discredited Leuchter Report on the gas chambers at Auschwitz.

Columnist Michael Gerson argued in The Washington Post that the Holocaust "is not a he-said-she-said debate" and treated the assignment as a misuse of false balance in the classroom. In a 2015 keynote at the American Association for State and Local History, later published as an essay in History News, Stanford education researcher Sam Wineburg argued the district had misdiagnosed the problem: in his view the teachers needed training in how to evaluate online sources, not sensitivity training. He called the result "a perfect storm" of Common Core's push for multi-source argumentative writing, an absence of teacher training in source evaluation, and the open internet.
