= Langdon Cheek =

Landon Napoleon Cheek was an African-American Baptist missionary who served in the British Central Africa Protectorate, later renamed Nyasaland, between 1901 and 1906. There, he assisted John Chilembwe, the founder of the Providence Industrial Mission during the church's formative period. After returning to the United States, he became a Baptist pastor for almost 50 years. Cheek died in Chicago in 1964.

== Early life ==
Landon was born in Canton, Mississippi in 1871. His parents were Frank Cheek, a former slave and later Baptist minister, and Ada, a Cherokee, and he was later described by George Simeon Mwase, a Nyasaland African, as coloured in the South African sense, or mulatto. At some point, he moved to Bridgeton, Missouri and became pastor in its Baptist church, although there is no record of what theological training he undertook or where. Cheek applied to the Foreign Missions Board of the National Baptist Convention in 1899 to be assigned as an overseas missionary. He was accepted and, after a year acquiring sufficient funds from the African-American churches interested in his work, he left New York in January 1901, arriving in Nyasaland in April.

== Nyasaland ==
On his arrival, he joined John Chilembwe at the Providence Industrial Mission (PIM) that Chilembwe had started in 1900 in Chiradzulu district. Cheek later cooperated with Chilembwe in building its main church at Mbombwe in that district. The PIM was financially supported by the National Baptist Convention, which also sent Emma B. Delaney, who had training as a teacher and nurse, to join the mission in 1902. Both Cheek and Delaney helped Chilembwe to set up industrial-based education courses during the mission’s formative period. Both left Nyasaland in 1906, partly because the National Baptist Convention reduced financial support once PIM was established, but also as Cheek was suffering from poor health. Although Delaney undertook further missionary work in Liberia up to 1914, Cheek did not apply for another overseas missionary posting.

While in Nyasaland, Cheek married Chilembwe’s niece, Rachel Lydia Chilembwe, in 1904 and the couple had three children before leaving the protectorate, one of which died there, and had two more children in the United States. Rachel Cheek (née Chilembwe) died in the United States in 1918.

== Return to USA ==
When Cheek left Nyasaland, he was requested by Duncan Njilima, a prominent associate of Chilembwe who was later executed after the Chilembwe uprising, to take his two sons, Frederick and Matthew, to be educated in the United States. Both of Chilembwe's sons received a high school education in the U.S. and Frederick later attended university in Kentucky, supported by the National Baptist Convention.

After his return to the United States, Cheek spent over 50 years as a pastor and raised funds for African-American missionary activities.

== Sources ==
- M. Bamford, A. Reed, G. Shepperson and D. Stuart-Mogg, (2013). The 1904 Registrations at the Blantyre Registrar's Office of the Marriages of Pastor John Chilembwe and the Reverend Landon Cheek. The Society of Malawi Journal, Vol. 66, No. 1, pp. 46–50.
- Black Christian News Network, (2012). 100 Black Christians in History, Bushey, St Paul's Press.
- S. M Jacobs, (1992). Give a thought to Africa: Black Women Missionaries in Southern Africa. Bloomington, Indiana University Press. ISBN 0-253-20705-3.
- G. S. Mwase (edited. R. I. Rotberg), (1970). Strike a Blow and Die: A Narrative of Race Relations in Colonial Africa with Revised Introduction. Cambridge, Harvard University Press. ISBN 0-674-84345-2.
- D. Stuart-Mogg, (2007). Frederick Njilima (Gresham) M.M. The Society of Malawi Journal, Vol. 60, No. 1, pp. 23–30.
