= Emma Beard Delaney =

Baptist missionary

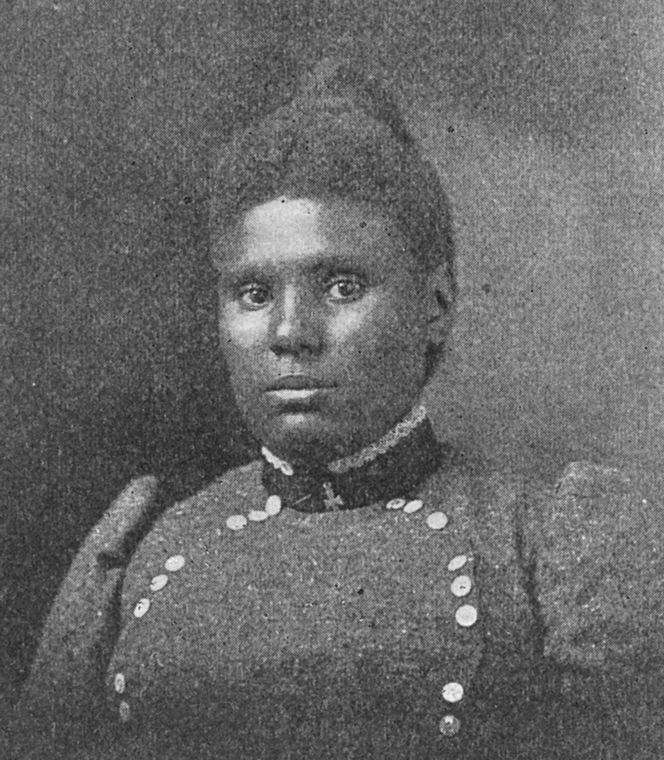

Personal life
- Born: January 18, 1871 Fernandina Beach
- Died: October 7, 1922 (aged 51) Fernandina Beach
- Cause of death: Hematuric fever
- Resting place: Bosque Bello Cemetery
- Home town: Fernandina Beach, Florida
- Parents: Daniel Sharp Delany (father); Anna M. Delany (mother)
- Education: Spelman Seminary
- Known for: Missionary work in Africa
- Other names: Emma B. Delaney, Emma B. Delany, Emma B. De Lany

Religious life
- Religion: Christianity
- Denomination: Baptist
- Profession: Teacher

Senior posting
- Period in office: 1902 – 1922

Emma Beard Delaney (January 18, 1871 – October 7, 1922) was a Baptist missionary and teacher, one of the earliest African-American missionaries from USA who worked in Africa, specifically Liberia and the British Central Africa Protectorate (now Malawi).

== Early life and education ==
Delaney was born in 1871 in Fernandina Beach, Florida to Daniel Sharp Delany, who worked as a pilot on a revenue cutter called the George S. Boutwell, and Anna M. Delany. She was Henry Beard Delany's niece and goddaughter, and her middle name came from his. Her family name varied in spelling, versions included Delany and De Lany. Delaney joined the Baptist church at the age of thirteen.

She studied at St. Joseph's Academy in Fernandina Beach and then Spelman Seminary in Atlanta. At the seminary, she graduated in 1894 and completed their missionary training course in 1896. She also underwent the nurse training course at the seminary, finishing in 1892 and was awarded a gold medal for proficiency.

== Career ==
She worked as a matron at the Florida Baptist Institute at Live Oak.

=== African missions ===
Spelman graduates, Nora Gordon (1889) and Clara Howard (1890), had left on missions to the Congo Free State. Delaney also had Congolese classmates at Spelman, Lena Clarke and Maggie Rattray. She had already wished to become a missionary, and her Spelman experiences contributed to making her mind up.

The Baptist State Convention of Florida met at First Baptist Church in Fernandina Beach in April 1899. One of the decisions it took was to send Delaney on a mission to Africa. She sailed to the British Central Africa Protectorate in 1902, only the second African-American (after Landon N. Cheek) and the first African-American woman to arrive as a missionary in Malawi.

Delaney traveled under appointment by the Foreign Mission Board of the National Baptist Convention to join the Providence Industrial Mission founded by John Chilembwe and largely funded by the Foreign Mission Board. She had to endure disruptions during the journey, missing her steamboat connection at Cape Town, and being stranded there for nearly a month. As an African-American woman, she also had to face racism in British-controlled Africa.

At the Providence Industrial Mission station in Chiradzulu district, Delaney was initially the sole teacher. She began learning the local, Nyanja language. She started a women's society and taught girls sewing too. Delaney helped convert the small station into the Providence Industrial Mission over the next four years. When she set sail for home on May 1, 1905, she wanted to be accompanied by one of the mission students, Daniel Sharpe Malekebu, whose parents had opposed his desire to go with her for higher studies. Delaney had converted both him and his sister Anna Malekebu to Christianity, giving them the names of her parents in the process. Daniel walked on his own down to the coast at Beira, and worked his way to Britain and then USA. She and the Baptist church helped Malekebu obtain a medical degree in the USA. Malekebu returned to Chiradzulu in 1926 to head the mission there.

Delaney arrived home on August 2, 1905. Over the next four years, she focused on raising funds for her own mission as well as others. Delaney wanted to return to Chiradzulu, but the British government denied her permission. She traveled to Liberia on June 8, 1912 instead, arriving in Monrovia on July 14, 1912 to join Susie M. Taylor and Eliza L. Davis in the Grand Bassa region, sixty miles from Monrovia. She traveled to the hinterland nearby, opening the Suehn Industrial Mission in 1916. The mission offered education across general subjects and topics in industrial arts, economics and health. World War I disrupted communication and commerce significantly in the region, forcing Delaney to send 55 of 84 children in the mission back to their villages.

Delaney returned to the US by October 1920, after hard work and ill health had taken their toll. She gave several speeches in the country on behalf of the National Baptist Convention. She also met Malekebu who had married by then Flora Zeto.

== Death and legacy ==
Delaney contracted hematuric fever and died in Fernandina Beach in October 1922. She was buried in Bosque Bello Cemetery.

The Women's Mission and Education Convention of Florida unveiled a monument stone at Delaney's burial site in Bosque Bello Cemetery in 1935. On August 26, 1979, the First Missionary Baptist Church in Fernandina Beach named its new education block Emma B. Delaney Fellowship Hall in Delaney's honor.

Delaney was honored by the state of Florida which recognized her as one of the Great Floridians. Her Great Floridian plaque is placed in the First Missionary Baptist Church, 22 South 9th Street, Fernandina Beach. Emma B. Delaney Day is celebrated in Florida Baptist Churches the third Sunday in May.
