= Jennifer Rosanne States =

Canadian cause figure (1965–1968)

Jennifer Rosanne States was a black Canadian child who died at age three in September 1968 and made national headlines when she was refused burial in an all-white cemetery.

States had been very ill from soon after birth. Her parents, with six other young children, were unable to care for her and sent her to a white foster family in Windsor, Nova Scotia. When she died this family tried to have her buried in the St. Croix Cemetery. However, the managing board cited a 1907 bylaw banning blacks and natives from the cemetery. States was instead buried in a traditionally black cemetery nearby. The incident came to the attention of the national media and caused a general outcry. The cemetery board quickly backed down and deleted the offending bylaw.

== See also ==
- Africville
- Viola Desmond
