= Addie Aylestock =

Canadian minister

Rev. Addie Aylestock (1909–1998) was a Canadian minister in the British Methodist Episcopal Church, the first woman minister to be ordained in that church, and the first black woman to be ordained in Canada.

== Personal life ==
Aylestock was the daughter of William Aylestock and Minnie Lawson and was the eldest of eight children. She was born in Glen Allan, near Elmira, Ontario, from one of the many black farming communities in the province of Ontario; her family lived depending on where work was available. Her family was descended from blacks who settled along the Conestogo River in Regional Municipality of Waterloo and Wellington County, Ontario.

She was raised in the (white) Methodist Church; she moved to Toronto when the Great Depression struck, and got a job as a domestic servant, and later as a dressmaker. While working as a domestic servant, she attended evening classes at Central Technical School in Toronto. A desire to become a missionary (in Liberia) led her to enroll in the (transdenominational) Toronto Bible College, from which she graduated in 1945. While a student in college, Aylestock became active with the youth and working with Sunday school in a BME (British Methodist Episcopal) church on Chestnut Street in Toronto. The pastor encouraged Aylestock to consider becoming a deaconess.

She joined the British Methodist Episcopal Church (an offshoot of the African Methodist Episcopal Church) and became a deaconess in 1944. Her first position was in the church in Africville. She also served as a deaconess in Halifax, Montreal, and Toronto. After the BME allowed for the ordination of women in 1951 (prompted by the church superintendent's belief in Aylestock's capability), she was the first to be ordained, and was assigned to the BME Church in North Buxton. She served as pastor in three further churches, namely in Montreal, Toronto and Owen Sound. Aylestock's obituary, published in the St. Catharines Standard, said she also presided over churches in Fort Erie and Niagara Falls.
