= Edith Hester McDonald-Brown =

African-Canadian artist (1886-1954)

Edith Hester MacDonald-Brown
- Born: Edith Hester MacDonald-Brown; December 17, 1886; Africville, Nova Scotia, Canada
- Died: December 17, 1954 (aged 68); Nova Scotia, Canada
- Spouse: William Henry Brown Jr

Edith Hester McDonald-Brown (December 17, 1886 – December 17, 1954) was an African-Canadian artist. She is thought to be the first documented Black female painter in Canadian art history.

== Biography ==
=== Early life and beginnings ===
Edith McDonald-Brown was born on December 17, 1886, to Thomas G. W. McDonald and Jessica Brown. She grew up in a middle-class household in Africville, near Halifax, Nova Scotia, Canada. While living in Africville, she worked at a general store run by her mother, Jessica Brown.

McDonald-Brown's interest in painting began as a young girl. One of her earliest surviving pieces dates back to 1898, produced at age twelve.

It is speculated she may have attended art school while briefly living in Montréal's Plateau district near Parc Lafontaine and Rachel before returning home, where she married William Henry Brown Jr. Because her paintings are signed "Edith McDonald," it is presumed that her work predates her marriage to William Henry Brown Jr.

== Works ==
=== Paintings ===
Only four of her paintings have survived, ranging from 1898 to 1906: three landscapes and a still life. Each painting is in its original frame and was painted in oil with beautifully polished, nearly imperceptible brushstrokes. They are said to be the first oil paintings by a black woman in Canadian art history. McDonald-Brown’s granddaughter, the late Geraldine Parker was able to preserve the four existing paintings passed down to her.

=== Exhibitions ===
A fifth known painting and the only McDonald-Brown painting ever to be exhibited was titled Sweet Peas (1911). A still life of a vase of flowers, although it has since vanished.

McDonald-Brown was virtually unknown until David Woods, artistic director of the Black Artists Network of Nova Scotia (BANNS), co-curated the 1998 exhibition “In this Place: The Black Art in Nova Scotia,” the first-ever show of African Nova Scotian art. David Woods discovered McDonald-Brown's surviving artworks through his own "door-to-door" study to refute the commonly believed belief that Nova Scotia lacks "any black art." Woods would go to people’s homes and discover whatever valuables they had hidden in their basements to display at the exhibit.

McDonald-Brown's under-documented work bears witness to the little-known existence of African-Canadian art production around the tenure of the twentieth century.

== Death ==
McDonald-Brown died on her birthday, December 17, 1954, in Nova Scotia, at the age of 68. The cause of her death is not specified in available records. Majority of her lifetime was spent living in Africville.
