= Stephens Gerard Malone =

Canadian writer

Stephens Gerard Malone is a Canadian-born novelist. Born in Trenton, Ontario, he was educated in Montréal, Quebec. He currently lives and writes on Canada's east coast city of Halifax, Nova Scotia where he's written for a variety of media, including television and periodicals. In 1994, he published his first novel Endless Bay (The Mercury Press) under the pseudonym Laura Fairburn. His second novel, Miss Elva (Random House, Canada) followed in 2005 and was short-listed for the Dartmouth Book Award. Malone's third novel I Still Have A Suitcase In Berlin (Random House, Canada) took eight years to write and was released in May 2008. The book was translated into French in 2011 under the title 5 Minutes de plus à Berlin and was published by Québec Amérique. Big Town, the author's fourth novel, is a fictionalized account of the eviction of the citizens of Africville in the late 1960s. It was published by Vagrant Press in September 2018, and reviewed in the Globe and Mail.

Miss Elva was shortlisted for the Atlantic Book Award.

== Books ==
- "The Unnameable" - 2026
- Jumbo - 2023
- The History of Rain - 2021
- Big Town - 2011
- 5 Minutes de plus à Berlin - 2011
- I Still Have A Suitcase In Berlin - 2008
- Miss Elva - 2005
- Endless Bay (written under the name Laura Fairburn) - 1994
