= Daniel Sharpe Malekebu =

Malawian doctor, missionary, and activist

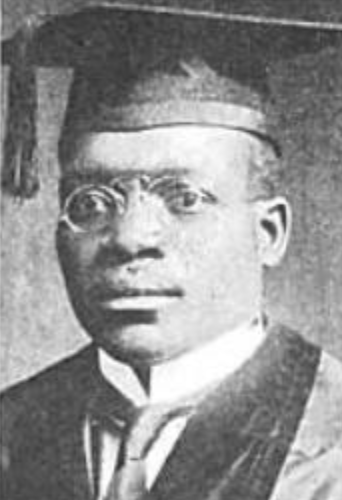
- Daniel Sharpe Malekebu, from a 1929 publication
- Born: March 1st, 1889; Chiradzulu, Blantyre, Malawi
- Died: October 8th, 1978 (age 89); Chiradzulu, Blantyre, Malawi
- Education: Selma University, National Training School, Meharry Medical College, University of Pennsylvania, Moody Bible Institute
- Occupations: Doctor, Christian missionary, political activist
- Known for: Being the first Malawian doctor, reopening the Providence Industrial Mission
- Spouse: Flora Ethelwyn Zeto
- Awards: Meharry Medical College President's Award, Key to the City of Nashville, Tennessee Governor's Award, Special Letter of Commendation from the White House

Daniel Sharpe Malekebu (March 1, 1889 – October 8, 1978) was a doctor, Baptist missionary, and anti-colonial activist native to Nyasaland (modern Malawi). Malekebu was one of the first students of the Providence Industrial Mission founded by anti-colonial activist John Chilembwe. At the young age of fifteen, Malekebu ran away from home to seek higher education in the United States. He graduated from Meharry Medical College in 1917, becoming the first Malawian person to receive a medical degree.

In 1926, as a missionary with the National Baptist Convention's Foreign Mission Board, he reopened the Providence Industrial Mission for the first time since the 1915 Chilembwe uprising had caused the colonial government to shut it down. In 1929, Malekebu established the Chiradzulu District Native Association, a political forum for the native leaders of Chiradzulu to protest colonial policies. In 1945, Malekebu founded and served as President of the National Baptist Assembly of Africa, a unified organization of Baptist officials from Nyasaland, Mozambique, Northern Rhodesia (modern Zambia), Southern Rhodesia (modern Zimbabwe), and South Africa. By 1950, Malekebu's Providence Industrial Mission had become "the most powerful Christian body in Africa," with over 18,000 members and over 300 churches. In 1967, the city of Nashville, Tennessee held a service to honor Malekebu's fifty years of "service to humanity." In recognition of his important contributions, he received a ceremonial Key to the City of Nashville, the Tennessee Governor's Award for outstanding service, and a Special Letter of Commendation from the White House.

== Early life ==
=== 1889–1905: Childhood in Nyasaland ===
On March 1, 1889, Daniel Sharpe Malekebu was born in the village of Chiradzulu, located in the Blantyre District of Nyasaland (modern Malawi). He was born to Lisoka Chambo and Malika Malekebu, a powerful Yao chief. After John Chilembwe founded the Providence Industrial Mission in 1900, Malekebu became one of the mission's first students and converts. Malekebu's teacher at the mission school was Emma Beard Delaney, an African American missionary with the National Baptist Convention's Foreign Mission Board. During Malekebu's time at the school, Delaney informally adopted him as her houseboy and interpreter.

=== 1905–1921: Education in the United States ===
After Delaney returned to the United States in 1905, Malekebu decided to follow her against the will of his parents with hopes to seek a higher education. He ran away from home and walked about 400 miles to the port city of Beira, Mozambique. There, he found a job as a cabin boy on the S.S. Matebele and travelled to London, United Kingdom. From London, he found a job on the S.S. Saint Paul and travelled to the United States. He finally arrived at Ellis Island, New York on August 19, 1905. Within the next several days, he took a train to Columbus, Ohio, where he and Delaney had arranged to meet. Delaney took him back to her home in Fernandina Beach, Florida, where he stayed for the following months.

In 1906, Malekebu started his undergraduate studies at Selma University in Selma, Alabama. In 1910, he transferred to the National Training School in Durham, North Carolina, where he completed his undergraduate studies in 1913. In 1913, Malekebu began a lecture series at churches throughout the Midwest in which he rallied support for African missionary work, often educating people about African culture and history in the process. From 1913 to 1917, Malekebu studied medicine at Meharry Medical College in Nashville, Tennessee, making him the first Malawian person to graduate from medical school. From 1917 to 1918, he studied Tropical Medicine and lectured for the Anthropology Department at the University of Pennsylvania in Philadelphia, Pennsylvania. During his time in Philadelphia, he also accepted a merit position as the chief resident physician at the Mudgett Hospital and Training School for Nurses. From 1918 to 1919, Malekebu studied theology at the Moody Bible Institute and served as an assistant minister at the Olivet Baptist Church in Chicago, Illinois.

On March 26, 1919, Malekebu married Flora Ethelwyn Zeto. Zeto, an immigrant from the Congo Free State (modern Democratic Republic of the Congo), was the adopted daughter of African American missionary Clara Ann Howard and a graduate of Spelman College in Atlanta, Georgia. From 1919 to 1921, Malekebu and Zeto travelled throughout the South, continuing Malekebu's popular lecture series.

== Career ==
=== 1921–1926: Return to Africa ===
In the aftermath of the 1915 Chilembwe uprising, the colonial government shut the Providence Industrial Mission down. The Mission's central church was demolished, and most of its leaders were either executed or imprisoned. On March 16, 1921, Malekebu and Zeto returned to Nyasaland as missionaries with the Lott Carey Foreign Mission Convention, with plans to reopen the Providence Industrial Mission. But the government detained the couple upon arrival and ordered them to leave the country, enforcing a 1920 policy which inhibited American-educated Africans from returning home. In a 1962 letter to Hastings Banda, Malekebu recalled that he was not permitted to enter because the government believed he would become "another John Chilembwe."

Malekebu and Zeto travelled from Nyasaland to Cape Town, South Africa, where Malekebu served the Shiloh Baptist Church as a minister. In 1922, the Lott Carey Convention placed the couple in Liberia, where Malekebu became a teacher at a mission school called the Ricks Institute. In 1924, Malekebu and Zeto arranged new contracts with the National Baptist Convention Foreign Mission Board. After some correspondence between the National Baptist Convention and the government of Nyasaland, the government finally concluded that Malekebu was "politically harmless" and approved his plans of reopening the Providence Industrial Mission. On February 3, 1926, Malekebu and Zeto were welcomed back to Nyasaland with a "cordial" reception from civilians and government officials alike. They reopened the Providence Industrial Mission under "strict" instructions from the National Baptist Convention to "avoid political involvement".

=== 1926–1938: The Providence Industrial Mission ===
Upon its reopening, Malekebu became the new Chairman of the Providence Industrial Mission (PIM). With the help of generous donations from African American churches, the PIM made rapid progress under Malekebu's leadership. By October 1926, the PIM had established congregations at Chiradzulu, Mulanje, Magamero, and Angonia. By July 1927, the PIM consisted of one main station (the Providence Station) at Chiradzulu, and seven outstations located throughout Nyasaland and Mozambique. It "transcended tribal boundaries", serving over 1200 members from a diverse range of tribes.

In line with Malekebu's own expertise, the PIM took primary interest in education and medicine. On November 28, 1926, the PIM opened a school at the Providence Station in Chiradzulu to teach students English and arithmetic. By October 1927, the PIM school served a student body of over 400 students, including 138 residential students. The school had an average attendance rate of 80%, which was significantly higher than the nationwide average of 68%. Within its first year of operation, the school qualified for a government grant, signifying the government's official recognition of the school. Next to this school, the PIM established the James E. East Memorial Hospital, a small hospital with a capacity of sixteen beds.

The PIM also offered a wide range of other social services. Upon the requests of local chiefs, the PIM supervised the construction of new schools, dormitories, clinics, churches, roads, and bridges. Moreover, the PIM organized several agricultural projects. The PIM itself was home to a "thriving" garden containing over six acres of maize, sweet potatoes, cassava, and beans. Finally, the PIM created new markets in several villages to promote the trade of local goods. One village chief commented on the PIM's contributions, "Dr. Malekebu has done great work in this country, but the greatest of his work is in the making of a market."

In 1929, the PIM started the reconstruction of its central church, the New Jerusalem Baptist Church. After four years of work, the new church was finally completed and became a symbol of the PIM's revival. Malekebu spoke of the church, "What makes it great, is when we think it was conceived, planned, by Africans; built by Africans." At about this time, the PIM started expanding its work to the broader Southern African region. In 1933, the PIM began holding services in Northern and Southern Rhodesia.< A year later, it started holding services in South Africa. The PIM continued to expand with outposts throughout Southern Africa in the late 1930s, despite mounting financial constraints due to the Great Depression.

Throughout the 1930s, as Malekebu and Zeto both experienced "bouts of ill health", they sent multiple letters to their Foreign Mission Board requesting assistance and permission to take medical leave. Yet the Board denied their requests for years, presumably due to financial concerns. The Board finally recalled the couple to the United States in the spring of 1938, by which point Zeto had already grown seriously ill.

=== 1929–1934: The Chiradzulu District Native Association ===
In line with the growing trend of native associations springing up throughout Africa, Malekebu inaugurated the Chiradzulu District Native Association (CDNA) in 1929 and became a member of its executive board. Just like other native associations across the continent, the CDNA became a political forum for native leaders to protest government policies. The CDNA's stated goals were to represent the natives of Chiradzulu in political affairs, to educate native people about existing and proposed government policies, and to hold public meetings to discuss issues of public interest. As such, the CDNA claimed to be the "rightful representative" of the people of Chiradzulu. The first meeting of the CDNA saw the attendance of over 400 Chiradzulu residents.

Native associations were required to allow the presence of government officials at their meetings, which limited the scope of the CDNA to relatively "moderate", lawful protests. Nevertheless, the CDNA managed to address some of the most pressing issues in Nyasaland at the time, including the new system of indirect rule, the collapse of local tobacco prices, land alienation and exploitation of tenant farmers under the thangata system, and the taxation of children which forced many underage girls to resort to child marriage. As a result of his leadership in the CDNA, Malekebu was appointed as a member of the Chiradzulu District Council in the early 1930s. District Councils were the only recognized links between native associations and state governments, meaning that all recommendations from native associations were required to pass through their local District Councils before reaching their state governments. Thus, Malekebu's appointment to his local District Council significantly increased his political influence.

While the CDNA found limited success with its recommendations to the government, it represented an important challenge to colonial rule. Furthermore, the CDNA succeeded in strengthening the relationships between native leaders throughout Nyasaland. In fact, the CDNA collaborated closely with fellow native associations throughout Nyasaland, even planning for eventual unification into a single organization. After five years of operation, the CDNA disintegrated in 1934 due to new government restrictions.

=== 1938–1950: The National Baptist Assembly of Africa ===
After leaving Nyasaland in 1938, Malekebu and Zeto spent six years in the United States on medical leave. Although they planned on a much shorter period of leave, World War II made international travel more difficult and dangerous, which delayed their plans to return to Nyasaland. The couple finally returned to Chiradzulu and resumed their work at the PIM in 1944.

In 1945, Malekebu was appointed acting principal of the Foreign Mission Board's largest station in South Africa, the W. W. Brown Memorial Station located in Johannesburg. By this point, he was supervisor of over 50 churches, 2 schools, and a staff of 30 people. Having accumulated broad influence throughout East and Southern Africa, Malekebu founded the National Baptist Assembly of Africa (NBAA) that same year, in 1945. Modeled after the National Baptist Convention, the NBAA was a unified organization of Baptist ministers from Nyasaland, Mozambique, Northern and Southern Rhodesia, and South Africa. In the second week of every August, the NBAA held an Annual Assembly in which thousands of ministers and their congregations gathered to sing, pray, and preach in a range of Southern African languages. Malekebu took pride in the diversity of languages present at these Assemblies, stating that it "demonstrated [their] power."

In 1947, Secretary C. C. Adams of the Foreign Mission Board embarked on a tour of the PIM's outstations and participated in the NBAA's Annual Assembly. He reported over 12,000 attendees at that year's Assembly. As a result of this tour, Adams appointed Malekebu as "Supervisor of Southern, Central, and East Africa", making him the official leader of all Foreign Mission Board missions at the time. This marked a "turning point" in Malekebu's authority and in the National Baptist Convention's support for the PIM. In 1950, Malekebu purchased 800 new acres of land to expand the work of the NBAA. By this time, the PIM had become the largest religious organization in Nyasaland and the National Baptist Convention's largest African mission. With over 18,000 members and over 300 churches, it constituted "the most powerful Christian body in Africa."

=== 1950–1967: The African Baptist Assembly of Malawi Inc. ===
Due to increasing health concerns, Malekebu and Zeto travelled back and forth between Nyasaland and the United States throughout the 1950s. The couple made three separate trips to the United States in 1950, 1952, and 1956. In 1958, the couple returned to Nyasaland for a more extended stay, determined to continue working in spite of their old age. That year, the PIM reported a total of 6,870 students and 5,393 patients across all of its stations.

On July 6, 1964, the British protectorate of Nyasaland officially became the independent country of Malawi. This resulted in the rebranding of the PIM as the African Baptist Assembly of Malawi Inc., though most commonly it continued to be known and referred to as the PIM. In 1967, Malekebu briefly returned to Nashville, Tennessee to accept the highest award of his alma mater, the Meharry Medical College President's Award. The city of Nashville held a service in honor of Malekebu's fifty years of "service to humanity". In recognition of his important contributions, Malekebu received a ceremonial Key to the City of Nashville, the Tennessee Governor's Award for outstanding service, and a Special Letter of Commendation from the White House signed by President Lyndon B. Johnson.

=== 1967–1978: Retirement and financial controversy ===
In the late 1960s, the PIM became mired in financial controversy. In 1969, the Malawian government shut down or took over multiple PIM schools because the PIM had not used a government grant for its intended purpose, which was to pay the salaries of teachers. Likewise, the National Baptist Convention accused the PIM of misusing and mismanaging Foreign Mission Board funds. At this point, the National Baptist Convention was in great debt on account of the PIM. Fifteen different creditors sued the National Baptist Convention for failing to pay back loans spent on the PIM, demanding a total of over $15,000.

In 1971, Secretary William Harvey III of the Foreign Mission Board travelled to Chiradzulu to investigate the situation. Harvey reported that some ministers of the PIM were indeed mismanaging or embezzling Foreign Mission Board funds which were supposed to finance employee salaries and various projects. Neither Malekebu nor the minister who was in charge of the PIM's finances were able to give a "satisfactory" explanation. While Malekebu himself was found innocent of financial fraud, he was ultimately held responsible for his failure of oversight as the chairman of the PIM.

In light of this controversy as well as Malekebu's old age and ailing health, the National Baptist Convention requested that Malekebu retire to the United States. With Malekebu's approval, Harvey appointed Reverend Leonard Muocha as the new Chairman of the PIM and President of the NBAA. Muocha was a longtime PIM minister who had sometimes acted as chairman during Malekebu's periods of absence. Malekebu and Zeto left Nyasaland on November 12, 1971. After 45 years of missionary service, Malekebu and Zeto finally retired in Atlanta, Georgia. Zeto died just six years later on September 21, 1977.

In 1978, a faction of disgruntled PIM ministers appealed to the High Court of Blantyre to reject the legitimacy of Muocha's appointment and his claim to PIM property. These ministers argued that the PIM was totally independent of the Foreign Mission Board, and therefore the Board did not have the power to retire Malekebu or to appoint Muocha. Thus, they maintained that Malekebu was still the rightful Chairman of the PIM. In 1978, Malekebu returned to Malawi for the last time to testify in this case, claiming that he was indeed the rightful Chairman of the PIM. Ultimately, the Court ruled in favor of Muocha and the Foreign Mission Board.

In the last month of his life, Malekebu founded a new church called the Independent Baptist Convention, located in Chiradzulu. About half of the PIM's ministers left the PIM to join this church. On October 8, 1978, Malekebu died in his hometown of Chiradzulu, at 89 years of age.

== Legacy ==
=== Lasting influence ===
To a great extent, Malekebu achieved his goal of building a unified Christian community throughout Southern and East Africa. The African Baptist Assembly of Malawi, Inc. had an estimated 800 congregations and 72,000 members in 2020. As of 2021, its president is Reverend McFord Chipuliko.

=== Historical significance ===
Malekebu forged his own place in a long line of pan-African activists. He drew inspiration from the work of pan-African activists such as Booker T. Washington, W.E.B. Du Bois, and Marcus Garvey, adopting traditional pan-African ideals of "self-reliance", "race solidarity", and "race pride".

Malekebu also set an academic and professional precedent for Hastings Banda, the first Prime Minister and President of Malawi. Banda himself maintained that he "had always looked up to Malekebu for guidance in his career". Banda became the second Malawian medical graduate after Malekebu when he too graduated from Malekebu's alma mater of Meharry Medical College in the early months of 1937. Much like Malekebu, Banda took a primary interest in education, evident in his founding of the Kamuzu Academy in 1975.

Banda also maintained that Malekebu had "disappointed" him with his apolitical stance on the unification of Nyasaland, Northern Rhodesia, and Southern Rhodesia into the Federation of Rhodesia and Nyasaland in 1953. In the 1950s, Banda and other leaders of the Nyasaland African Congress assumed that Malekebu's PIM would join the Congress in its Anti-Federation Campaign. But even after the Nyasaland Emergency of 1959, the PIM deliberately remained neutral on the issue of federation. "Where was he when others were fighting for independence?" Banda once asked in reference to Malekebu.

== Sources ==
- Lipede, Abiola Ade (1991). Pan-Africanism in Southern Africa: 1900–1960 (Thesis). OCLC 830561207.
- Saunders, Davis Lee (1973). A History of Baptists in East and Central Africa (Thesis). OCLC 7180740, 13727093 ProQuest 302691769.
