= Faith Nolan =

Canadian musician (born 1957)

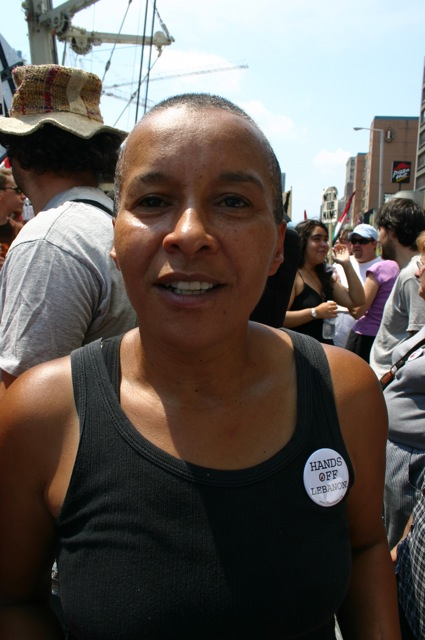

Background information
- Born: 1957 (age 68–69); Halifax, Nova Scotia, Canada
- Genres: Folk; jazz; blues
- Occupations: Musician, singer, songwriter, activist
- Instrument: Guitar
- Website: www.faithnolan.org

Faith Nolan (born 1957) is a Canadian social activist, folk and jazz singer-songwriter and guitarist. She currently resides in Toronto, Ontario, Canada.

== History ==
Nolan is considered part of a Canadian feminist music movement of the 1980s and 90s. In the early years of her career, she performed with the feminist band, The Heretics. Nolan's music is described as "her political work, a politics firmly rooted in her being working class, a woman, African Canadian and queer." Nolan is openly lesbian, and uses her music to link her sexuality with the musical history of black North America.

Part of her activist work has been documenting the social, political and cultural history of Africville, a historic African Canadian settlement in Maritime Canada. Rinaldo Walcott cites her as one of the African-Canadian artists working to prevent the erasure of the black presence in Canadian history.,

Nolan has spent her recent years working with women prisoners at various prisons worldwide including Vanier Centre for Women in Milton, Ontario and the Grand Valley Institution for Women in Kitchener, Ontario.

Her aim is "to see social changes occur that will stop the degradation of women and will stop unjustly punishing women for defending themselves."

She also runs a musical therapy workshop at Vanier Centre for Women and at Sistering, a women's organization located in downtown which provides support to homeless, marginalized, and low-income women.

In her quest, she has founded and directed several choirs including Singing Elementary Teachers of Toronto, CUPE Freedom Singers, the Women of Central East Correctional Centre, and Sistering Sisters.

In 1994, Nolan in conjunction with the Toronto Women of Colour Collective, once known as the Toronto Multicultural Womyn in Concert, helped establish Camp SIS (Sisters in Struggle) located in the Kawarthas, 2 hours northeast of Toronto.

In 2009, Nolan was named Honoured Dyke for Toronto's 2009 Pride celebrations and led the 2009 Dyke March.

On November 29, 2014, Nolan was recognized at the third annual Min Sook Lee Labour Arts Award Gala for her contribution to the arts and labour movement.

In 2021, her album Africville was named the jury winner of the Polaris Heritage Prize at the 2021 Polaris Music Prize.

== Personal life ==
Nolan and her family lived in Africville, a predominantly black community in Halifax, Nova Scotia. At a young age, she and her family moved to Toronto, Ontario's Cabbagetown neighbourhood. Her mother is a white woman of Irish descent and her father is of African Canadian and Mi'kmaq heritage.

== Discography ==
- Africville (1986)
- Sistership (1987)
- Freedom to Love (1989)
- Hard to Imagine (1996)
- Faith Nolan: A Compilation 1986-1996 (1996)
- Overloaded, Fed Up and On the Line (2000)
- Let it Shine (2002)
- Faith Nolan Live with Mary Watkins (2003)
- Day Done Broke (2006)
- One World (2008)
- Mannish Gal (2008)
- Hang On CUPE (CUPE Freedom Singers) (2009)
- Jailhouse Blues (2013)

== Filmography ==
- Older, Stronger, Wiser (1989)
- Sisters in the Struggle (1992)
- Long Time Comin, featuring the life and music of Faith Nolan (1993)
- "Critical Resistance": Prison Industrial Complex (1996)
- Listening to Something (2000)
- Within These Cages (2003)
- Stand Together (2003)
- Till Death Do Us Part (2008)
- Missing Murdered Women "Highway of tears" (2011)

== Radio ==
- Queer Black Women Blues (1991)
- I am a Prisoner (2004)
- CBC Toronto interview (2007)
- CBC Vancouver interview (2008)

== Awards ==
- Maple Blues Nominee (1999)
- Recipient Honored Dyke (2001)
- Recipient, Robert Sutherland Award for Activist and Musical Contributions to African Canadians (2005)
- Toronto Arts Council Award, Grant (2006/2000)
- Ontario Federation Labour Cultural Activist Award Recipient (2008)
- Canada Council Awards, Grant (2008/2002/1996)
- OAC Award, Grant (2008/2004/2000)
- Afro Nova Scotian Cultural Music Award (2009)
- EGALE Black History Month Recipient (2011)
- Mayworks Social Justice Music Activist Award (2014)

== See also ==
- List of Canadian musicians
- List of LGBT rights activists
- List of women's rights activists
- List of Canadians
- Activism
- Music of Canada
