= African United Baptist Church =

The African United Baptist Church is a denomination of Baptists in the Republic of Malawi. It is one of two schisms from the Providence Industrial Mission (forerunner of the African Baptist Assembly of Malawi, Inc.) of the National Baptist Convention, USA, Inc. The formation of the African United Baptist Church occurred in 1946.
