= Septimus Clarke =

Septimus D. Clarke (1787–1859) was a farmer and leader within the Black community in Nova Scotia.

Clarke was one of thousands of Black refugees who escaped slavery in the United States during the War of 1812 and migrated to the British colony of Nova Scotia. Little is known of his life before November 1816, by which time he, his wife, and four children had established a farm of about 10 acres (4.0 ha). In 1819, having cleared and planted all the land he had been granted, Clarke petitioned Governor Dalhousie for an additional 250 acres (100 ha), as the family required more trees for fuel. Dalhousie appears to have been swayed by the request, suggesting a grant of 100 acres (40 ha), although Surveyor General Charles Morris scaled the grant back further to 50 acres (20 ha). His was the first successful request for additional land by a Black immigrant, and encouraged others to apply for similar grants.

Clarke was active in a number of organizations within the Black community. In 1854 he cofounded the African United Baptist Association of Nova Scotia alongside Richard Preston. He also served as secretary and treasurer of the African Friendly Society and as president of the African Abolition Society. He supported reformist politicians who endorsed expanded rights for Black Nova Scotians.

Clarke died on 15 January 1859 in Preston, Nova Scotia, and his funeral service was held at the African Chapel in Halifax.
