= Ricky Anderson =

Canadian boxer

Personal information
- Nickname: The Gentleman
- Nationality: (Canada) Canadian
- Born: October 28, 1960 Africville, Nova Scotia
- Occupation: Boxer
- Weight: Welterweight

Boxing career
- Stance: Southpaw

Boxing record
- Total fights: 21
- Wins: 19
- Win by KO: 13
- Losses: 2
Medal record
Men's amateur boxing
Representing Canada
Junior World Championships
Silver medal – second place	1979 Tokyo	Welterweight

Ricky Anderson (born in Africville, Nova Scotia) is a Canadian former professional boxer and two-time Canadian welterweight champion. Anderson was due to represent Canada at the 1980 Summer Olympics in Moscow, but the Canadian teams boycotted the event. He continued to become a top amateur boxer, and won 19 of his 21 fights as a pro.

== Early life ==
Ricky Anderson was born in Africville, Nova Scotia, a historic Black community in Canada. When the land was expropriated by the City of Halifax, his family was moved to North End, Halifax.

== Amateur boxing career ==
=== 1974–1979 ===
Anderson's amateur boxing career began in 1974. He captured the Nova Scotia flyweight title under the guidance of Taylor Gordon. He won a silver medal in the 105 pound light flyweight division at the 1975 Canada Winter Games held in Lethbridge, Alberta. He went on to won a gold medal in the featherweight (125) class at the Canadian Junior Olympic Boxing finals in Edmonton in August 1976.

On May 3, 1977, he was named the best intermediate boxer at the Nova Scotia Amateur Boxing Championships and national trials. He represented Nova Scotia at the CABA's Canadian National Intermediate Amateur Boxing Championships in North Bay, Ontario, in May 1977. He won a gold medal in the lightweight division.

Anderson became the first Canadian to beat a Cuban boxer at an international tournament. In February 1978, he scored a first round victory against Cuba's Omar Martinez at the Giraldo Cordova Cardin International Boxing Tournament in Cienfuegos, Cuba. At the 1978 Canadian Nationals in Sept-Îles, Quebec in May, he fought his way to the light welterweight final before losing a narrow decision to the two-time national champion.

He defeated French champion Dominique Durand of the French national team at an international tournament in Halifax in February 1979. After competing in international matches, Ricky was named to the Canadian amateur boxing team in November 1979 and set to travel to Yokohama, Japan. In December 1979, Anderson competed in the Levi's Cup, the first World Junior Amateur Boxing Championships held by the Amateur International Boxing Association. He fell short in the gold medal match to Israel Akopkokhyan of Armenia but became the first Canadian to capture a silver medal at the World Junior Championships (ages 17–19).

=== 1980 ===
On April 13, 1980, in Halifax, Anderson took gold in the light welterweight class at the Canadian Senior Amateur Boxing Championships, a qualifying event for the 1980 Summer Olympics. Shortly after, the 1980 Summer Olympics boycott was announced on April 22, 1980. In the following month in May, he won a gold medal in the light welterweight division at the 6th International Acropolis Cup tournament held at the Olympic Stadium in Athens, Greece. On June 26, 1980, Ricky Anderson was officially selected for the Canadian Olympic boxing team but did not get the chance to represent his country due to the political boycott of the event in Moscow, Russia. The Canadian boxers prepared for alternate competitions. In October 1980, he fought in London at the Wembley Stadium.

=== 1981 ===
In April 1981, Anderson won his second Canadian National Senior Amateur Boxing Championship at light welterweight in Toronto.

In Shreveport, Louisiana, he competed in the North American Amateur Boxing Championships, winning the North American Light Welterweight title by knocking out the U.S. National boxing champion James Mitchell. Following the win over Mitchell, he was named Canadian Athlete of the Month for September by the Canadian Sports Federation. The Halifax boxer participated in the 1981 Boxing World Cup in Montreal's Maurice Richard Arena. Anderson, fighting for the Canadian team, reached the world championship final against Vasily Shyshev of the Soviet Union. He was narrowly defeated in the final and took home the silver medal.

His overall amateur record stands at 97 fights, with 85 wins and 12 losses.

== Professional boxing career ==
His professional debut was against Averell Brady on June 1, 1982 at the Halifax Forum. Over the next 3 years, Anderson would score wins over Clyde Graves, Reggie McLean, Bobby Buscombe, Albert Cox, Billy Smith, Jose Vera, Felix Vanderpool, Kenny Smith, Jerome Artis, Armando Pinel, and Bobby Hackett. Only Graves and Vera went the distance with him as he built his record to 12-0. He suffered his first career loss in 1984 to 45-fight veteran boxer Ray Chavez Guerrero.

Ricky was given the nickname "The Gentleman" by CFL Executive J. I. Albrecht.

=== Canadian Welterweight Champion ===
Victories over Jamey Ollenberger in December 1984 and John Herbert in February 1985 would set up the rematch to avenge his first professional loss. Anderson, holding a 14–1 record, faced Ray Chavez Guerrero in a rematch on April 30, 1985, with the vacant Canadian Welterweight Championship on the line. The end came in the eighth round when the southpaw delivered a straight left hand that put Chavez down. The Halifax native became the new Canadian welterweight champion.

In a July 1985 title defense, he lost to Toronto's Donnie Poole, who retired from the sport afterward. Anderson made his ring return in November 1985 with a second-round knockout of New York's Juan Cantres. By December 1985, the Canadian welterweight title had been vacated by Poole, and Anderson reclaimed it in March 1986, becoming a two-time Canadian welterweight champion with his second win over John Herbert. Anderson spent time training for the Herbert fight at the Passaic County jail in New Jersey. He successfully defended his Canadian title in December 1986 by defeating Denis Sigouin of Hull, Quebec, via unanimous decision at the Halifax Forum. His next title defense was scheduled against then–number one contender Chris Clarke.

Anderson, then 26, was forced to retire prematurely from boxing in May 1987 while still champion, forced out by a persistent knee injury.

His professional record was 19 wins (13 KOs) and 2 losses.

On May 14, 1990, the two-time Canadian welterweight champion was inducted into the Canadian Boxing Hall of Fame.

== Professional boxing record ==
21 fights	19 wins	2 losses
By knockout	13	2
By decision	6	0
Draws	0	

== Education ==
Anderson completed his high school education at St. Patrick's High School in 1978. While boxing professionally, he attended Saint Mary's University and received a Sociology degree in 1988.

== Work career ==
Following his 12-year boxing career, he was appointed by the Nova Scotia Government as a Drug Prevention Information Officer with Addiction, Prevention, and Treatment Services.

In 1993, Anderson received an offer for a part-time sports broadcasting position. He accepted the role and worked as a CTV Atlantic weekend sportscaster until 1995. Anderson remained at his full-time job as a Drug Prevention Specialist at Addiction Services until his retirement in 2015.

On the side, Anderson created his own business, Go Ricky Motivational Services. On September 1, 2003, Anderson released "Win in the Arena of Life: Living a Life You Love Is Worth Fighting For," a 158-page self-help book published by Aslan Publishing.

He also worked as a member of the Nova Scotia Boxing Authority and Canadian Boxing Federation, government agencies that regulate professional boxing and mixed martial arts events provincially and federally. Anderson achieved 22 years as a general board member of the Nova Scotia Boxing Authority, at one point becoming vice-chairman.

== Personal life ==
Anderson volunteered for 10 years with the Ward 5 Community Centre in Halifax, two years of which he was chairman of the board.

== Honors and awards ==
- 1974 Nova Scotia Amateur Fly Weight Champion
- 1975 Canada Winter Games Silver Medalist
- 1977 Canadian Intermediate Lightweight Champion
- 1979 World Amateur Boxing Championships Silver Medalist
- 1980 Canadian Senior Light Welterweight Champion
- 1980 Summer Olympics Team Canada Member
- 1980 Sport Nova Scotia's Male Athlete of the Year Award
- 1981 Canadian Senior Light Welterweight Champion
- 1981 North American Championships Light-Welterweight Gold Medalist
- 1981 Boxing World Cup Light-Welterweight Silver Medalist
- 1981 Canadian Sports Federation's Canadian Athlete of the Month for September
- 1981 Sport Nova Scotia's Male Athlete of the Year
- Two-time Canadian Welterweight Champion (1985 & 1986)
- 1990 Canadian Boxing Hall of Fame inductee
- 2003 Nova Scotia Sport Hall of Fame inductee
- 2007 Black Ice Hockey and Sports Hall of Fame inductee
