= Eddie Carvery =

Canadian social activist (1946–2026)

Eddie Carvery (October 5, 1946 – February 14, 2026) was a Canadian social activist from Africville, Nova Scotia. The small, mainly black community in Halifax was destroyed by the city in the 1960s as an "urban renewal" project, after years of neglect and poor services.

== Biography ==
In the early 1970s, Carvery was friends with a Halifax tattoo artist named Robert Bernard MacLean (better known as Bob MacLean). On January 4, 1973, Carvery shot and killed MacLean in an apartment in Halifax's Uniacke Square. Carvery told police, who arrived on the scene, "I killed my buddy, but I didn't mean to." He was charged with manslaughter, but Judge E.D. Murray of the Supreme Court of Nova Scotia determined that the sawed-off .22 calibere rifle had faults that could have contributed to an accidental discharge. He determined that the available evidence suggested the death was "an accident" and dismissed the charges.

Carvery started his protest on the Africville site in 1970. Carvery lived in what became known as Seaview Park on and off over 25 years before making international news when the G7 came to Halifax in 1995. The City of Halifax tried to evict Eddie and his brother Victor from Seaview Park.

The brothers eventually moved out of the park and onto adjacent land, continuing the protest where the village school once stood. The Carverys remained protesting on the grounds of Africville as of 2010. Eddie remained at his protest site behind the newly reconstructed Africville Church as of February 2012.

Carvery had an extensive criminal record. In response to a 1989 aggravated assault. Appellate Justice Angus L. MacDonald sentenced Carvery to a three-year prison term. He termed the assault "the most heinous of acts" and noted that Carvery had an extensive criminal record dating back to 1964 with convictions for robbery, assault, resisting arrest, assaulting a police officer, public mischief and trafficking in a narcotic.

The Hermit of Africville, a biography of Eddie Carvery, was published by Pottersfield Press in 2010.

Carvery was featured on the 2022 podcast Africville Forever. He died on February 14, 2026, aged 79.
