= Bible Believers =

Website

Bible Believers is the website of the Bible Believers' Church of Sydney, New South Wales, Australia. The website gained national attention for containing Holocaust denial material.

Because the website reprints antisemitic material such as The Protocols of the Elders of Zion and Henry Ford's The International Jew, and Holocaust denial material from authors such as Bradley Smith and Mark Weber, a complaint was lodged under Australia's Racial Discrimination Act. In 2007, Justice Richard Conti of the Federal Court of Australia ordered Anthony Grigor-Scott to remove from the website antisemitic claims that Jews deliberately exaggerated the number of Jews killed during World War II. However, the order was overturned on appeal due to a legal technicality: "Bible Believers Church" could not be sued, since it lacked legal personality, and the Human Rights and Equal Opportunity Commission Act 1986 (Cth) (HREOC Act) would not permit (in the same proceeding) its substitution with another defendant who could be.

Bible Believers were described as "[o]ne of the most visible of the plethora of eccentric pseudo-Christian groups in Australia" and "extremist" by the Australia/Israel & Jewish Affairs Council (AIJAC) in their 2008 report on antisemitism in Australia.

The church is run by Anthony Grigor-Scott.
