= Joe Sealy =

Canadian jazz musician (born 1939)

Joe Sealy C.M.
- Born: Joseph Arthur Sealy; 16 August 1939 (age 87); Montréal, Quebec
- Origin: Canada
- Genre: Jazz
- Occupations: Composer, pianist
- Instrument: Piano
- Website: www.joesealy.com

Joseph Arthur Sealy (born 16 August 1939) is a Canadian jazz musician. He was awarded the Order of Canada in 2010.

== Awards ==
- Juno Awards of 1982 - Nominee for Best Jazz Album - Clear Vision
- Juno Awards of 1995 - Nominee for Best Contemporary Jazz Album - Joe Sealy & Paul Novotny Dual Vision
- Juno Awards of 1997 - Winner for Best Contemporary Jazz Album - Africville Suite
- Juno Awards of 2000 - Nominee for Best Contemporary Jazz Album - Instrumental - Joe Sealy & Paul Novotny Blue Jade
