= George Boyd (playwright) =

Canadian playwright (1952–2020)

- Born: 30 June 1952; Halifax, Nova Scotia, Canada
- Died: 7 July 2020 (aged 68); Montreal, Quebec, Canada
- Occupations: Playwright, news anchor

George Elroy Boyd (June 30, 1952 – July 7, 2020) was a playwright and a former co-host of the CBC Morning News. He was the first black national news anchor in Canada, working as an original anchor of the Canadian Broadcasting Corporation's Newsworld, which launched in 1989.

== Biography ==
One of a family of nine, of seventh-generation Empire Loyalist stock, Boyd was born and raised in Halifax, Nova Scotia. He has written for the stage, radio, television and motion pictures.

In 1988, with his debut play, Shine Boy, Boyd became the first indigenous African-Nova Scotian to have a play professionally produced at Neptune Theatre, Nova Scotia's premier main stage. Since then, his plays were shown in Lahore, Pakistan, Toronto, Winnipeg, Montreal and New York, US, among other locales.

A recipient of numerous awards from his native Nova Scotia, in 2000, his play Consecrated Ground was nominated for a Governor General's Award for drama.

Wade in the Water, produced by the Black Theatre Workshop of Montreal in 2004, and Centaur Theatre in 2005, garnered Boyd a nomination for the Montreal English Critics Circle Award (MECCA).

More recently his play Gideon's Blues was adapted into an hour-long TV drama called The Gospel According to the Blues, directed by Thom Fitzgerald for Emotion Pictures.

Boyd resided in Montreal. His 2009 play, Le Code Noir, about the life of 18th-century composer Joseph Bologne, Chevalier de Saint-Georges, was produced by Black Theatre Workshop of Montreal, at the Segal Centre for the Performing Arts.

One of Boyd's last works was tentatively entitled The Days Of Douglass, and regarded the final days in the life of Frederick Douglass.

Boyd died July 7, 2020, in Montreal, Quebec.

== Bibliography ==
- Two by George! Consecrated Ground and Gideon's Blues (1996)
- Consecrated Ground (1999)
- Gideon's Blues (2004)
- Wade in the Water (2005)
