= Africville Suite =

Studio album by Joe Sealy
- Released: 1996
- Recorded: April 28–30, May 5, September 22–24, 1996
- Studios: Inception Sound, Toronto, Ontario
- Genre: Jazz
- Length: 63:15
- Label: Sea Jam
- Producer: Paul Novotny

Joe Sealy chronology
Dual Vision (1994)	Africville Suite (1996)	Blue Jade (2000)

Africville Suite is an album by Canadian jazz pianist Joe Sealy, which was released in 1996 by Sea Jam. It won the 1997 Juno Award for Best Contemporary Jazz Album.
