= Providence Industrial Mission =

Baptist church in Malawi

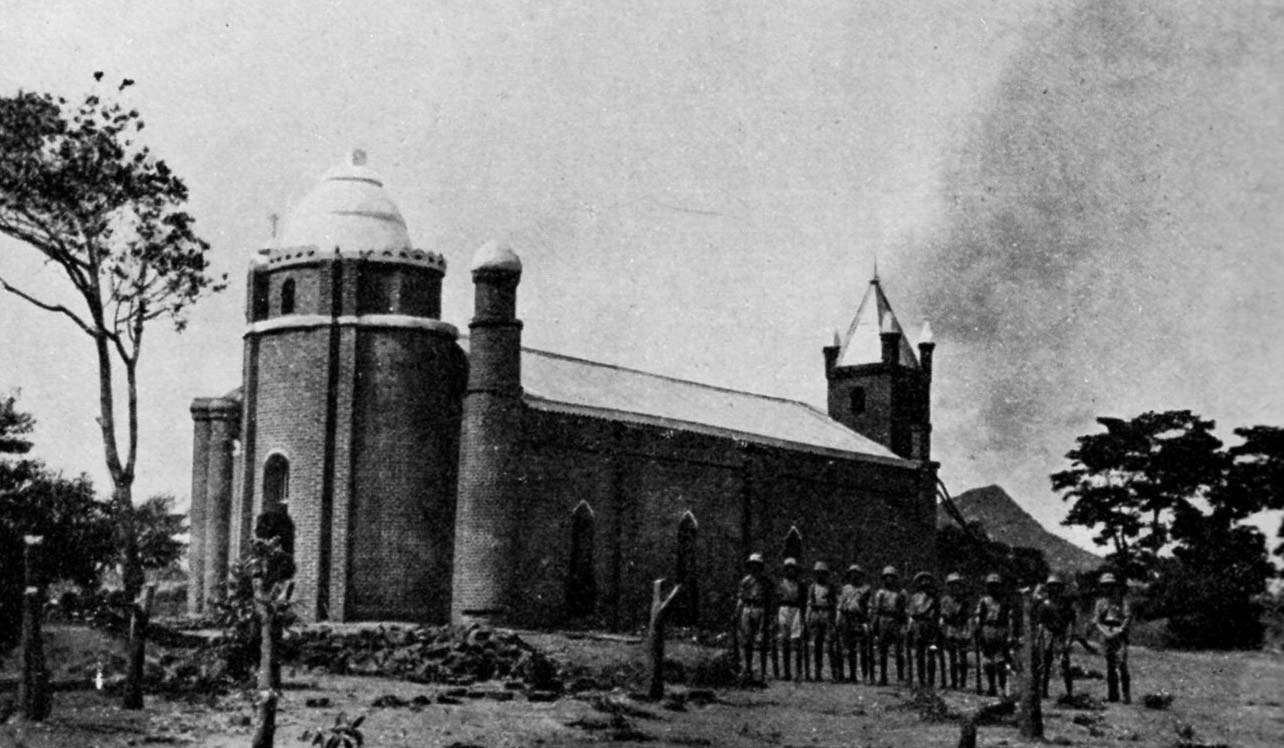
View of the church of the Providence Industrial Mission in Mbombwe, Nyasaland, shortly after its capture by government troops in 1915

Providence Industrial Mission (PIM) was an independent church in Nyasaland, modern-day Malawi. The PIM was founded by John Chilembwe, who would later lead a rebellion against colonial rule, upon his return to Nyasaland in 1900 from the United States, where he had been studying in a Baptist seminary. PIM continues today to operate in conjunction with the Foreign Mission Board of the National Baptist Convention, USA, Inc.

The PIM served as the focal point of the 1915 Chilembwe uprising. In the aftermath of the uprising, the government shut the PIM down and either executed or imprisoned most of its leaders. The government demolished its main church, the New Jerusalem Baptist Church, after recapturing the village of Mbombwe in which it was situated. The PIM remained closed until 1926, when it reopened under the leadership of former student Daniel Sharpe Malekebu. Malekebu led the PIM until 1971, for a total of 45 years. Learnard Muocha took over as Chairman between 1971 and 1987.
