= John Chilembwe's motivation =

1915 Malawian rebel leader's motives

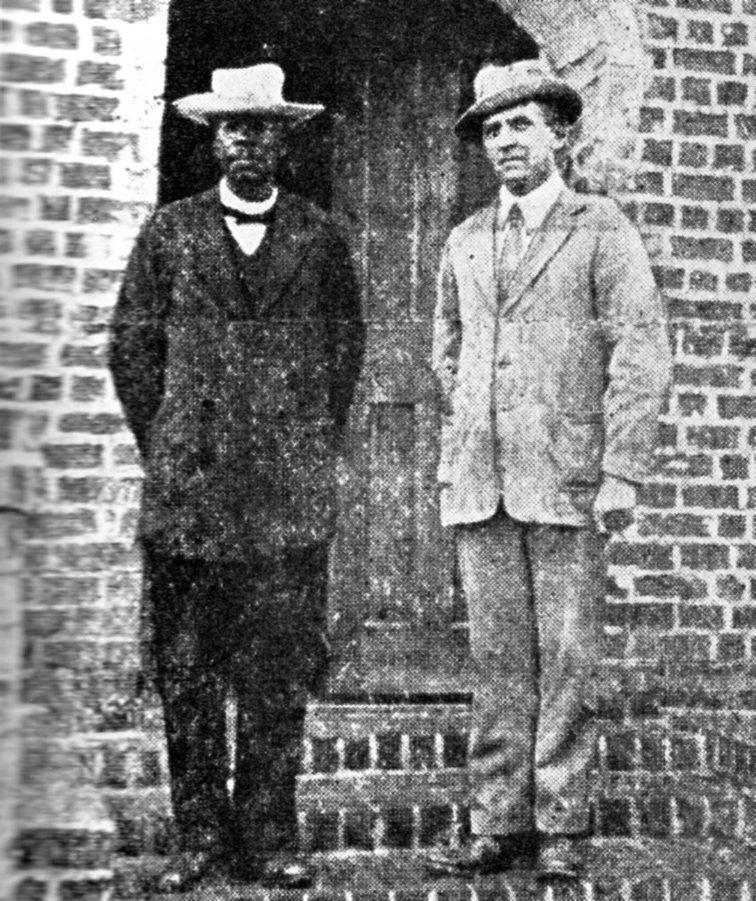
The last known photo of John Chilembwe (left) taken in 1914 about a year before his death

The ideas, people and events that contributed to John Chilembwe's motivation and influenced him to undertake the uprising in 1915 were considered by the Commission of Inquiry shortly after the rising was defeated, and have exercised historians of Malawi during much of the period since his death. Whether the dominant ideas were political, social, economic or religious and how these combined is unclear, because Chilembwe did not leave a detailed record of the reasons for his armed revolt. As he was an ordained Baptist minister, much attention has focussed on his religious ideas, whether these were orthodox or related to millennialism, the extent to which such potentially conflicting religious ideas existed, particularly in the period shortly before the rising, and the part that such beliefs played in the decision to revolt and the course of the uprising.

Although there is reasonable evidence that, in the first decade after his return to Nyasaland at least, Chilembwe aimed at the social and economic advancement of Africans through education and the adoption of useful knowledge in line with the ideas of Booker T. Washington and W.E.B. Du Bois, there is little direct evidence of his ultimate political aims, his theological beliefs or what he preached, particularly in the first dozen years of his ministry. This may be because, as is shown in his surviving correspondence, he had little interest in theological discussion. He also declined to follow Joseph Booth in moving from orthodox Baptist doctrine to the acceptance of sabbatarianism and he had no known direct links to the Watch Tower Society and he is not known to have introduced any doctrinal innovations into his church services. Unlike Booth, who was notorious for his radicalism and promotion of both fundamentalist and Ethiopianism, or Elliot Kamwana, whose preaching was openly millennial and considered to be anti-colonial, both of whom were unpopular with the colonial authorities and with most European missionaries, and were both deported for the radical political views they openly expressed, Chilembwe's work at the Providence Industrial Mission favourably impressed European officials and missionaries at least up to 1914.

Undoubtedly African millenarian uprisings did exist, such as that leading to Bulhoek massacre, where there was no doubt that the participants, a religious group led by Enoch Mgijima with no political agenda, believed that the world would soon end and mounted frontal attacks on armed troops and police. However, Cobbing, writing about an earlier colonial revolt, cautioned about pursuing the "false trail of millenarianism" where unbearable political, social and economic pressures were sufficient causes for an attempt to drive out European colonisers, where there is no need to suggest other, less evident, causes and where the evidence for millenarianism is speculative or ambiguous. Chilembwe received an orthodox Baptist theological training in the United States and he never joined any other denomination. He used biblical language in his correspondence, as may be expected from a Baptist minister, but (unlike Booth's and Kamwana's) his known writings were never unambiguously millenarian. As far as is known, Chilembwe held standard Baptist views and rejected the Saturday observance favoured by Booth: he also stated that he had no connection with the Watchtower movement.

Several historians consider that the Chilembwe uprising was planned, although perhaps without sufficient care, at several clandestine meetings before any action was taken, that Chilembwe acquired a textbook on military tactics, and that the authorities received advance warnings of the intended uprising several months before it took place. Another source claims that little or no preparation was made for the revolt, because the authorities discovered none from monitoring Chilembwe's correspondence, although it adds that he knew his mail was being monitored.

== Context of Chilembwe's activities ==
If Chilembwe made a detailed record of the reasons why he, an educated and respected clergyman, conspired with like-minded Africans to carry out an armed revolt against the Nyasaland government, that record has been lost, and he and most of his chief collaborators were killed or fled immediately after the uprising failed and were not interrogated. A number of possible reasons have been proposed: some are supported by direct contemporary evidence, others depend on later sources or are more speculative. Chilembwe was apparently willing to work within the framework of the colonial system until 1912, although from 1909 his aim of improving the conditions of Africans, particularly labour tenants on European estates awakened a consciousness that might be considered nationalistic, and there were signs of his alienation from the contemporary European administrators and landowners during the last years of his life. There is good evidence that, as early as 1908 he had incurred significant debts and, by 1914, he was being pressed for payment while his financial support from the National Baptist Convention in the United States had undergone a significant reduction. He was also suffering from asthma and failing eyesight during this period.

From 1911, Chilembwe became increasingly concerned with the situation of Mozambican immigrants, many of whom were members of his church, that were working on European-owned estates, particularly the A L Bruce Estates property at Magomero These workers suffered from an increase in hut tax in 1912 and from the effects of a famine in 1913. He and other mission-educated African "new men", some of whom became Chilembwe's lieutenants in the rising, were angered by the refusal of the settlers and government to accept their worth or provide them with suitable career opportunities or a political voice. Finally, the African casualties in the East African campaign, both soldiers and porters, deeply affected him, and government demands for more porters had a direct impact on his Providence Industrial Mission members.

== Accounts of Chilembwe and his uprising ==
=== Earlier accounts ===
The colonial authorities sought first to contain, then to explain the revolt. It was contained by executing most of the African planters of Chiradzulu District and many of the Bruce Estate's foremen (or capitãos), both groups being seen as actual or potential leaders in any disturbances. In April 1915, soon after the rebellion, the Nyasaland government set-up a Commission of Inquiry to report on the origins, causes and objectives of the "Native rising in the Shire Highlands". It consisted of three colonial administrators, a senior Anglican missionary and a representative of the European estate owners, and its terms of reference included examining alleged grievances that may have influenced the rising and the effects of mission teaching on African attitudes.

The commission's report suggested that the main objective of the rising was to exterminate or expel Europeans and to set up of an African state or theocracy with John Chilembwe at its head. It put most of the blame on Chilembwe's political and religious teaching and on the mainly immigrant congregation of his mission at Mbombwe, although it accepted that working conditions on some estates were often unsatisfactory The Commission criticised the Scottish-run churches, especially the Church of Scotland's Blantyre Mission, which had educated many of Chilembwe's principal followers, for treating African church members as the equals of European members. It also considered that the independent African churches and the Church of Christ and Seventh Day Baptist missions, which it lumped together as "Watchtower", had promoted racial animosity by preaching racial equality, suggesting that they should be made subject to strict government control.

The first comprehensive biography of John Chilembwe by Shepperson and Price considered that the causes of his uprising went back many years rather than being triggered solely or mainly by events shortly occurring before it took place. They regarded Chilembwe as an early nationalist, looking forward to the creation of a nation, rather than to re-establishing the power of traditional leaders. Chilembwe did not reject European education and civilisation, but believed that Africans should share the benefits of Western technology and culture that the Europeans in Nyasaland monopolised. These authors speculate that Chilembwe's main intention was to set up an independent, strongly theocratic African state in Nyasaland, although its proposed extent and its governance were unclear, and that his secondary intention was to stage a protest against the war and colonial oppression Shepperson continued to regard Chilembwe in nationalist terms after his 1958 work was published, and to regard his letter of November 1914 to the "Nyasaland Times" entitled "The Voice of African Natives in the Present War" as setting out his view that African fatalities and other sacrifices in World War I entitled them to respect and a share in government. Shepperson's work is still said to deserve attention as a statement of Chilembwe's aims and to be critical in establishing his motivation.

We understand that we have been invited to shed our innocent blood in this world's war which is now in progress throughout the wide world. On the commencement of the war we understood it was said indirectly that Africa had nothing to do with the civilised war. But now we find that the poor African has already been plunged into the great war.

A number of our people have already shed their blood, while some are crippled for life. And an open declaration has been issued. A number of Police are marching in various villages persuading well built natives to join in the war. The masses of our people are ready to put on uniforms ignorant of what they have to face or why they have to face it.

We ask the Honourable government of our country which is known as Nyasaland, Will there be any good prospects for the natives after the end of the war? Shall we be recognised as anybody in the best interests of civilisation and Christianity after the great struggle is ended? Because we are imposed upon more than any other nationality under the sun. Any true gentleman who will read this without the eye of prejudice will agree and recognise the fact that the natives have been loyal since the commencement of this Government, and that in all departments of Nyasaland their welfare has been incomplete without us. And no time have we been ever known to betray any trust, national or otherwise, confided to us. Everybody knows that the natives have been loyal to all Nyasaland interests and Nyasaland institutions. For our part we have never allowed the Nyasaland flag to touch the ground, while honour and credit have often gone to others. We have unreservedlv stepped to the firing line in every conflict and played a patriot's part with the Spirit of true gallantry. But in time of peace the Government failed to help the underdog. In time of peace everything for Europeans only. And instead of honour we suffer humiliation with names contemptible. But in time of war it has been found that needed to share hardships and shed our blood in equality. It is true that we have no voice in this Government. It is even true that there is a spot of our blood in the cross of the Nyasaland Government. But regarding this worldwide war, we understand that this was not a royal war, nor a government war, nor a war of gain for any description; it is a war of free nations against a devilish system of imperial domination and national spoliation. If this were a war as above mentioned such as war for honour, Government gain of riches, etc., we would have been boldly told: Let the rich men, bankers, titled men, storekeepers, farmers and landlords go to war and get shot. Instead the poor Africans who have nothing to own in this present world, who in death, leave only a long line of widows and orphans in utter want and dire distress are invited to die for a cause which is not theirs. It is too late now to talk of what might or might not have been. Whatsoever be the reasons why we are invited to join in the war, the fact remains, we are invited to die for Nyasaland. We leave all for the consideration of the Government, we hope in the Mercy of Almighty God, that some day things will turn out when and that Government will recognise our indispensability, and that justice win.

Shepperson and Price noted that Chilembwe had received an orthodox theological training with the support of the National Baptist Convention, one of the two largest Black Baptist groups in the United States. His work in Nyasaland received financial assistance from this organisation and never broke his link with it. Shepperson considered that Chilembwe had never claimed to be a prophet or messiah, and rejected the Commission of Inquiry's attempt to link him to the Watchtower movement. Chilembwe stated that he had no connection with the Watchtower movement, other than having a few of its members in his congregation that might have been influenced by its views.

Robert Rotberg also categorised Chilembwe's revolt as largely secular and nationalistic in origin, and suggested that he either planned to establish an independent government in the Shire Highlands if successful, or to make a protest against colonial rule. He suggested that Chilembwe's nationalist awareness grew after 1909 and he became unwilling to work within the colonial system after 1912, particularly when a severe famine in Mozambique in 1913 created a flood of migrants seeking a livelihood in Nyasaland. Although Rotberg modified his views over time, his main theme remained the link between early 20th century resistance movements and the secular nationalism that lead to independence in the second half of that century. He regarded Chilembwe as expressing orthodox Baptist views rather than millenarian teachings to a relatively small but stable congregation, at least until 1914. He considered Chilembwe's revolt was a reaction to the colonial government's failure to pay attention to his protest against African deaths in the war, although initially accepting there were also some suggestions of millenarian eschatology. However, he later ignored millennial influences and formed the view of Chilembwe's that decision to revolt resulted from a variety of psychological stresses.

=== Later accounts ===
Although Shepperson and Price and Rotberg did not have access to full access to the colonial archives, Tangri (who did) later confirmed these authors' view of Chilembwe, stating that, although some of his followers may have been influenced by the Watchtower movement and received Watch Tower Society publications, there was no direct evidence to suggest that Chilembwe himself was in any way influenced by that movement. Tangri stressed non-religious causes, mainly the conditions of workers on European-owned estates, particularly the A L Bruce Estates and Chilembwe's personal circumstances as the causes of the revolt, which aimed at setting up an African state if possible, or registering a symbolic protest if this failed. Tangri also notes Chilembwe's attempts to forge alliances with a number of independent African churches: although these included some millennial Seventh Day Baptist congregations in the Cholo area and Churches of Christ in Blantyre District, Tangri reported that Chilembwe's contacts with those orthodox churches that had broken away from European-run missions and with small African initiated churches in the Zomba, Mlanje and Blantyre districts were more numerous and their links with him were more important than those he had with millennial churches.

Phiri, who had full access to the records of the 1916 Commission of Inquiry, argues that Chilembwe's theological training and experience of racism in the United States resulted in a vision of achieving black freedom and equality through education, and also made him resentful of colonial domination and European attempts to limit African access to education. Phiri, who makes only one passing reference to the Watchtower movement, also quotes two credible sources who recorded that Chilembwe sent his forces out with a short motivational speech that stressed patriotism, not millennial beliefs:

"You are going out to fight as African patriots, not just for Nyasaland but the whole of Africa, for the whole black race. Africa is one, from the Indian Ocean to the Atlantic Ocean; remember this. Freedom is the cry for Africa, of the Negro race. I am not saying you are going to win the war and then become kings…some of us will die on the battlefield and leave behind widows and orphans, but they will be a free people. Our blood will mean something at last."

== Influence of Joseph Booth ==
Chilembwe received some early education at the Blantyre Mission, but was not baptised into the Church of Scotland. At the time that Joseph Booth met John Chilembwe in Nyasaland, and when he later travelled with Chilembwe to the United States in 1897, Booth was still an orthodox Baptist minister but he left the Baptist Church in 1898, joining the Seventh Day Baptists, and he remained in that denomination until 1901 when he left Nyasaland for South Africa, becoming a Seventh-day Adventist there in 1902. When Chilembwe returned to Nyasaland in 1900, he was at first Booth's main contact during Booth's absence from Nyasaland, but the relationship grew less close over time Although Booth's main doctrinal concern, from 1898 until his death, was a Sabbatarian belief, he was unable to convince Chilembwe, who did not follow Booth in accepting sabbatarian practices. Booth's membership of the Watch Tower Society lasted for only three years, from 1906 to 1909: there is no evidence that, then or later, Booth suggested that Chilembwe should join that society or adopt millennial beliefs, or that he sent Watch Tower Society literature to him.

Elliot Kamwana, who was educated at the United Free Church of Scotland Livingstonia mission but left there in 1901, may have met Booth in southern Nyasaland in 1902, and may also have been baptised as a Seventh Day Baptist there in 1902 before travelling to South Africa. He certainly met Booth in South Africa in 1907, after Booth had been appointed as a missionary there by the Watch Tower Society. Booth instructed Kamwana in a mixture of his own sabbatarian beliefs and Watchtower doctrines in preparation for Kamwana’ missionary work in Nyasaland. Once Kamwana had returned to Nyasaland in 1908, he became Booth's main contact there, and received Watch Tower Society literature from him.

Kamwana left the Watchtower movement in 1909 because his Sabbatarian beliefs were incompatible with its teaching, although many of the churches he founded in northern Nyasaland continued to receive publications and some funding from the American Watch Tower Bible and Tract Society until 1925, after which date that organisation disowned the congregations Kamwana founded and tried to prevent them from using the Watchtower name. When Kamwana was allowed to return to Nyasaland in 1937, he initiated the Mlondo or Watchman Healing Mission, an African initiated church independent of the Watch Tower Society, although many members still read the society's magazines. Unlike Chilembwe, Kamwana left notebooks and letters that make his acceptance of millennial doctrines and reliance on the Book of Revelation clear. Theologically, Kamwana would probably have believed that the initiative in overthrowing the British and bringing in the Millennium would come directly from God rather than from human agency. He considered 1914 as the start of a new age of a kingdom of God in Africa, not one of the apocalyptic destruction of white rule, although European missionaries claimed his millennial doctrines that all government but Christ's would cease were seditious.

From 1910, Booth's main contact in Nyasaland became Charles Domingo. Domingo had been educated at Livingstonia mission and in South Africa and, on his return to Livingstonia, became a teacher and later a preacher there, but failed to secure ordination as a Presbyterian pastor. After breaking with the Free Church in 1908, Domingo moved to southern Nyasaland and was baptised by Chilembwe, who encouraged him to move to Mozambique, the country of his birth. In 1909 and 1910, Domingo corresponded with Charles Taze Russell and joined the Watch Tower Society. Domingo also made contact Joseph Booth, who had by then left the Watch Tower Society, and he joined an independent Seventh Day Baptist church formed by Booth's disciples in the north of Nyasaland on his return from Mozambique. This church split into two sections in response to the Watch Tower Society's opposition to Sabbatarianism. Most of these congregations, those founded by Domingo and other disciples of Booth, rejected Watch Tower Society control and, by 1911, their division from the remainder had become total. Despite his earlier membership of the Watch Tower Society, Domingo did not express any millennial expectations that 1914 would bring the start of the Millennium and the end of colonial rule.

Although Booth's religious effect on his three Nyasaland protégés differed, reflecting the frequent changes in his denominational affiliations, his effect on their social and political outlooks was similar. Booth's aim was to achieve radical social change: he believed in complete racial equality, pacifismand the need to protest at the colonial powers' domination of Africans and expropriation of their land: he also advocated African religious, economic and political independence. Between 1895 and 1897, Booth developed his scheme of "Africa for the Africans" to promote African economic independence. This was to be achieved by Christian evangelisation, preferably by Africa-American and later African pastors, the provision of a higher level of education than European-run missions then provided, including teaching practical skills, in Industrial Missions; ideals Chilembwe fostered in the Providence Industrial Mission. Once there were sufficient educated and economically independent Africans, Booth suggested that they should use lawful means to gain the same social and political recognition as whites, with the intention that power should return to African hands over a relatively short period of time. Similar sentiments that were preached by Kamwana and initially by Domingo, although he became more conservative in later years.

== African-American influences ==
Chilembwe experienced contemporary American prejudice against negroes when he received his theological training in a segregated college in Lynchburg, Virginia, where he almost certainly studied African-American history and became aware of Nat Turner's slave rebellion and John Brown's raid on Harper's Ferry. The college principal, Gregory Willis Hayes, held militantly independent views, and the radical American Negro ideas he promoted through the works of John Brown, Frederick Douglass, Booker T. Washington, and others had a profound effect on Chilembwe. Shepperson and Price note there was a considerable African-American literature justifying violent uprising and supporting John Brown, although another source plays down the influence of American slave revolts on Chilembwe.

Separate African-American and African churches in the United States and South Africa arose from the segregation that existed in the mainstream nonconformist churches and the formation of non-white congregations that retained links with those churches: these are "Ethiopian" churches in the strict sense. In contrast, other African-American and African congregations that formed had no links to white churches or orthodox theology. These separatist churches were frequently Pentecostal and often described as "Zionist" in South Africa, and they were regarded as dangerous by the authorities there. Ethiopian and Zionist churches in sub-Saharan Africa were closely linked in the European colonial mind with African-Americans (or Africans educated in USA) preaching what colonial missions considered was a debased version of Christianity that promoting African independence. Chilembwe was educated in the United States at a segregated college for African-Americans, was connected to an African-American institution and had African-American helpers and, according to the definitions above, his American-inspired Providence Industrial Mission was an Ethiopian church with political aspirations resulting from these American influences. However, Kamwana's ministry, with its version of the Watchtower movement, apolitical, Zionist and with South African links, may be compared with of Enoch Mgijima's "Israelites", although these fought against police and troops at Bulhoek.

Throughout his ministry, Chilembwe was backed financially the National Baptist Convention of America, which also sent him their publications and provided an African-American Baptist minister and another helper until 1906. An African minister contemporary with Chilembwe in Nyasaland considered Chilembwe's teaching on race and colour differences to be purely American in inspiration. Shepperson has recently suggested that there was much uncatalogued documentary evidence about Chilembwe, mostly in America, particularly his letters to the National Baptist Convention's magazine, "The Missionary" that deserved further study. An African-American view stresses Chilembwe's orthodox Baptist training in the United States and considers that his reliance on the National Baptist Convention meant that the Providence Industrial Mission resembles an African-American mission comparable to the European missions, rather than an African initiated church. Chilembwe's view that blacks would achieve salvation and whites were heading for damnation probably came from his African-American training and contacts rather than inspiration from Watchtower or other millennial ideologies, and his ideal of African freedom was based on his admiration for John Brown.

== Chilembwe's possible millennialism ==
=== Background ===
The idea that Chilembwe was more than marginally affected by millennial views was examined by Jane and Ian Linden, whose study is almost entirely confined to the last year, particularly the last few months, of Chilembwe's life. Their argument for disregarding influences on Chilembwe before June 1914 is that in the second half of 1914 he became more receptive to millennial, and specifically Watchtower, influences. Their study claims that such previous authors as Shepperson and Price, Rotberg and Tangri minimised millennial explanations for the 1915 uprising, and they believe that, between October 1914 and January 1915, Chilembwe's attitude changed under millennial influence from passive acceptance of European dominance to rebellion. They regard Chilembwe sending his unpublished letter to a local newspaper in November 1914 as his last moderate act, after which he was pushed into a millennial uprising by his more militant followers.

While it is clear that the Watch Tower Society, certain other denominations and Elliot Kamwana held millenarian beliefs, little clear or direct evidence exists for Chilembwe holding such beliefs. The Lindens interpret an association between those that held such beliefs and John Chilembwe's followers as indirect evidence, what they term strong circumstantial evidence, that Chilembwe himself held the same millenarian beliefs, and that these were central to his motivation for the uprising. Some of those they regard as his followers were members of acknowledged millennial congregations in Ncheu or Limbe, in particular the minority of them sufficiently literate in English to read Watch Tower Society publications, and the focus of the Lindens' research is on what they refer to as the Ncheu side of the rising, rather than Chilembwe's own Providence Industrial Mission, although McCracken considers events in Ncheu to have been a parallel and abortive rising outside Chilembwe's control.

Kamwana and his close followers were pacifists, who probably believed that the start of the Millennium and the overthrow of colonial rule would be initiated directly by God, not come through human agency. Despite his deportation in 1909, and even after the predicted Millennium did not begin in October 1914, the majority of Kamwana's followers remained pacifists, and later formed independent churches following a version of Watchtower doctrines. A minority of his supporters joined Chilembwe's congregation, and some of that congregation received Watch Tower Society publications and expressed millennial beliefs, but only a handful of Kamwana's former supporters took part in the uprising

The Lindens list individuals said to have had some connection with Chilembwe's rising whose social position and religious beliefs are known. However, the list includes Elliot Kamwana and his pacifist followers who did not join the uprising, Seventh Day Baptists, and followers of Watchtower or Church of Christ who were not members of Chilembwe's Providence Industrial Mission and were at most sympathisers of the rebellion, and also those who joined Chilembwe's rebellion but had little or no connection with millennial doctrines. Only Duncan Njilima and two others can be shown both to have been involved in the uprising and to have had millennial leanings.

Chilembwe received some of his early education at the Church of Scotland's Blantyre Mission, and, after his return to Nyasaland, he had limited but reasonably friendly relations with missionaries there. Many of his principal followers, including most of those involved in planning in the uprising, were educated at the Blantyre Mission, and 83 or 84 of those considered to be rebels were baptised members of the mission. Although some of these had left the Church of Scotland to join Chilembwe's congregation, others were still its members at the time of the uprising, and the Nyasaland Government's Commission of Inquiry criticised Blantyre Mission's leadership for treating African church members as the equals of European members.

The heterodoxy of early 20th century African congregations need not imply the heterodoxy of its pastors: Kamwana attracted huge audiences in 1908 and 1909 because his teaching addressed his audiences' concerns about witchcraft, many members of United Free Church of Scotland congregations in the 1930s used charms against witchcraft and dancing and drumming to cure spirit possession despite missionary condemnation. Additionally, shortly before 1914, many African members of conventional church congregations reverted to traditional beliefs or joined independent, African-initiated, churches. It is possible that the ordinary members of Chilembwe's congregations may have projected their unorthodox beliefs onto Chilembwe, rather than these being Chilembwe's own beliefs.

=== Evidence of millennial views ===
The Lindens link Chilembwe's millennial views to the Watchtower movement, and specifically to Kamwana's version of its doctrines, although they also mention some broader eschatological themes from the Book of Daniel and Book of Revelation. A later writer considers that Chilembwe was first influenced by radical evangelical concerns about racial injustice in the United States, views strengthened by his experiences in Nyasaland, but in the months before his rebellion, he concentrated increasingly on Old Testament End Times prophecies of the Book of Daniel, believing that they applied to the situation of Nyasaland in late 1914 and early 1915.

The final, italicised sentence of Chilembwe's letter dated 22 December 1914 is described as an undisguised eschatological proclamation, demonstrating he saw himself as a messiah who would inaugurate the 'New Jerusalem’, : although Chilembwe's interpretation of the final phrase is not recorded:

"We are not yet in prison.... It is true that I have written a letter to ask the government for the rights of my people. Brother Chinyama will tell you all about it as he has read the copy of the letter. My dear brethren be strong, preach the true Gospel trusting that our Heavenly Father will help us. Strengthen all weak brethren. Preach the Kingdom of God is at hand."

Chilembwe first mentions his letter of November 1914 asking for African rights, hoping for divine help in achieving that objective and finishing with a seven-word phrase open to both millennial and non-millennial interpretations. Albert Schweitzer contended that "...the Kingdom of God is at hand" showed a purely future expectation of the Kingdom of God, whereas an opposing view is that the Kingdom of God, foretold by the prophets, began on earth at the start Christ's ministry. The English meanings of "at hand": "near in time" and "happening at the present", reflect two meanings in the Greek original. However, the likely Hebrew original, meaning "to be present" or "to arrive", together with the opening phrase "The time is fulfilled..." points to it existing at the present time, not merely an expectation.

Despite the claim that Chilembwe saw himself as a messiah, Shepperson and Price deny that Chilembwe was ever called himself a prophet or messiah-like figure. Chilembwe's only recorded reference to "New Jerusalem" or "Jerusalem" was when he used these terms about his church at Mbombwe, which might have been a reference to Jerusalem, which in 1831 was the county seat of Southampton County Virginia, the area of Nat Turner's rebellion. There is no evidence to connect his use of these words to Charles Taze Russell's view of New Jerusalem as a symbolic representation of start of a millennial world government, whose inauguration should be awaited passively.

=== The rising ===
One account suggests that, at least until December 1914, Chilembwe had made no plans for an uprising and that he did not play a prominent role in it. David Kaduya, a former King's African Rifles soldier, who had talked of armed revolt since early 1914, was also said to be the effective commander of the rising in the Shire Highlands, although other sources treat him as one of five or six leaders of armed groups appointed by Chilembwe and his principal supporters. Kaduya was employed by the Providence Industrial Mission: his religious beliefs were confused and unorthodox, but he never hesitated in his view that that Africans should fight for their own nation.

Of the other leaders involved in the Blantyre attack, Duncan Njilima, a Providence Industrial Mission member, was said to hold millennial views although, at his trial, Njilima pointed to a meeting that he and John Gray Kufa had with Chilembwe on 16 January 1915 as the impetus for the rising, when Chilembwe claimed:

"All the Europeans want to kill all of us black men. We will therefore go quickly and kill the Europeans.”

Except that he was a Providence Industrial Mission member, little is known of Stephen Mkulitchi's religious views and John Gray Kufa, who was appointed lead one group, but failed to do so, was a deacon of the United Free Church of Scotland The attacks on A L Bruce Estates properties, apparently in reaction to the estate's harsh treatment of its workers, were led by two former capitãos (foremen) of the estate who had been sacked in 1913 for membership of the Providence Industrial Mission.

The confusion that followed the initial Blantyre attacks might be attributed to the participants’ expectation of divine intervention, or their failure to achieve their objectives. The attacks on A L Bruce Estates properties did achieve the more limited objective of attacking and killing or injuring several of the estate's European employees, but the fighters sent to Blantyre failed either to obtain substantial quantities of arms or to provoke a significant popular uprising. Accounts of Chilembwe's final sermon at Mbombwe on 24 January 1915 differ between a message of acceptance of defeat and one focussed on the millennium.

Finally, the Lindens argue that ethnic and religious divisions in Nyasaland precluded a widespread commitment to any nationalistic or pan-African concepts Chilembwe may have had, but Phiri notes the broad ethnic range of supporters he gathered at Mbombwe in preparation for the uprising. This included participants from the Yao, Lomwe, Nyanja, Chikunda, Ngoni and Tonga communities, hoping to achieve the common goal of African independence.

== Watch Tower Society theology ==
From the 1870s, the Watch Tower Bible and Tract Society prophesied an imminent Second Coming and the formation of a millennial kingdom, which would be created through supernatural agency not by human effort, and which would replace the established social and political order. Russell at first accepted that the Second Coming had taken place in 1874 and predicted that the formation of an elect group of 144,000 saints marked for salvation would be completed in 1878. This date was deferred first to 1881, next to 1914 and then to various later years before a specific date was abandoned. Taze believed that the establishment of the millennial kingdom would involve a phase of social disintegration lasting several decades, the "Battle of Armageddon", which Watch Tower members were told not to join in, followed by a phase of reconstruction. Before this second stage, and probably before the climax of Armageddon, the elect of 144,000 righteous, not defined by race, would undergo a transformation from a physical to a spiritual form.

Writers on Chilembwe acknowledge that Charles Taze Russell, the President of the Watchtower Bible and Tract Society, was a strict pacifist who told his followers to recognise and cooperate with earthly governments and avoid militancy. Kamwana claimed to have recruited and baptised whites as well as blacks in South Africa; and he followed the orthodox Watchtower teaching that did not condone violence. In rejecting Kamwana, his former followers referred to Chilembwe as American, and an African minister at Blantyre Mission regarded his views on race as American, not a description with millennial significance. Besides organising an armed uprising, Chilembwe, his followers claimed, considered all whites as unfit for salvation.

== Reaction and synthesis ==
=== Differing factual accounts ===
A recent general account of the Chilembwe rising relies principally on Shepperson and Price, supplemented by the accounts of White, the Lindens and Phiri with some references to Rotberg, Langworthy and the Commission of Inquiry This argues that the origins of the revolt were largely a result of the harshness of the thangata regime imposed on immigrants from Mozambique, Booth's and African-American influences on Chilembwe and denial of social and political advancement to educated Africans. It also suggests that its timing in early 1915, shortly after the start of the First World War and also at a time of apocalyptical expectations, was no coincidence

The account mentioned does not deal with the differences in factual presentation rather than just interpretation between the accounts of four of those scholars and the Lindens. Most researchers believe that the grievances that drove Chilembwe to consider a rising became apparent from between 1909 and 1913, although he was probably prepared to accept the colonial framework until 1912. It was probably the casualties among African soldiers and porters in the East African Campaign of the First World War that was the final trigger to his action. The alternative view is that Chilembwe's attitude changed from passive acceptance of European dominance to rebellion only between October 1914 and January 1915, and that he was pushed into an uprising by the millennial expectations of his more militant followers.

The majority of authors also believe that the Chilembwe uprising was planned over several months in 1914 and early 1915 and that Chilembwe himself took a leading part in the planning. The Lindens claim that little or no preparation was made for the revolt before January 1915, and that Chilembwe did not play a prominent role in its planning or direction. Finally, the confused state of the rebels after the first night of the rising is attributable either to their failure to obtain guns or create a popular uprising, or their expectation of divine intervention.

Despite Shepperson's view that Chilembwe had never claimed to be a prophet or messiah and could not be linked to the Watchtower movement, there is increasing support for the view that the uprising had a definitely Christian, and possibly millennial inspiration, and that Chilembwe should be regarded as a prophet, possibly an armed prophet like Nat Turner or John Brown.

=== Alternative interpretations ===
In the dispute on ideas that influenced Chilembwe, those scholars who concentrated on the social, economic and political aspects of his rising face the counterargument that he and his followers were influenced more by millennial ideas than nationalistic ones. Not only should writers considering such aspects not exclude religious motivations, but the political context of the religious beliefs of Chilembwe and his followers should be considered, something missing from the Linden's analysis.

Several recent writers consider that Chilembwe and his fellow "new men" were forward looking, but that their rising was a reaction to colonial pressures which predated nationalist movements, although they sometimes used apparently nationalistic terms. Most early African interest groups in Nyasaland were local, represented only a small educated African elite and promoted their demands for a political voice, not independence. Only in the 1940s, with the formation of the Nyasaland Native Congress, did one organisation represent the whole of Nyasaland and only in the 1950s did it start to press for future African majority rule.

However, if not a struggle for national independence, the rebellion was essentially a struggle for freedom from colonial restrictions that particularly affected two separate groups. The first group was agricultural workers, particularly Mozambican immigrants on European-owned estates, overworked, often physically ill-treated and suffering under the thangata regime, who formed the bulk of his Chilembwe's congregation. Chilembwe's preaching of Joseph Booth's radical egalitarian message had great appeal to this group. The second group were an emerging but discontented group of educated Africans, small-scale capitalists, planters and entrepreneurs, who were Chilembwe's friends and associates but not necessarily members of his church. They were frustrated by their inferior social position and lack of a political voice, and responded to African-American Baptist ideals of private land ownership and undertaking trading or commercial agriculture.

Most meetings between Chilembwe and his principal followers before the uprising were secret, so it is difficult to prove whether millennial or proto-national ideas were discussed. Although the Lindens rely on the information some witnesses gave to the government inquiry after the rising ended, this should be treated with some caution. The extent of the influence by Watchtower's millennial ideas on Chilembwe is also unprovable in the absence letters or diaries revealing his motivation, although the views in his letter to the Nyasaland Times in November 1914 argue against it being significant. The most that can be said with confidence was that millennial ideas were widespread in Africa in this period and Chilembwe and some followers may have been influenced by them to some extent

=== Synthesis ===
Chilembwe's personal motivation remains uncertain, but his concerns over the plight of immigrant workers on European-owned estates under the system of thangata, his quarrel with the A L Bruce Estates and William Jervis Livingstone, his growing hostility towards European rule from 1912 onwards and anger at African involvement in the First World War have all been recorded, as were his declining health, financial difficulties and personal problems. None of these alone can be proven as causing the rising but none can be ignored.

An African-American view, although acknowledging the Lindens' work, stresses the orthodox training Chilembwe received in the United States and his reliance on the assistance provided by the National Baptist Convention, so that the Providence Industrial Mission could be considered as an African-American mission comparable to the European missions in Nyasaland. Rather than being inspired by millennial ideology, Chilembwe's view that blacks would achieve salvation and whites were heading for damnation may well have derived from his African-American training and contacts, and his ideal of African freedom have been based on his admiration for John Brown.

Millennial expectations were high in Central Africa in 1914, but these views were mostly associated with Eliot Kamwana. Some of Kamwana's former followers were attracted to Chilembwe as possibly the only available charismatic African preacher after Kamwana's deportation or the failure of his prophesies. This attraction might not have derived from any contact Chilembwe had with Watchtower or his holding millenarian views but because his American training and African-American contacts connected him to an established African myth of the African-American as saviours who would free Africans from colonial rule. Historian Yekutiel Gershoni noted that after the outbreak of World War I, rumours that African-American soldiers had been seen participating in the East African campaign led to hopes that Kamwana's predicted "Battle of Armageddon", which he claimed would take place in 1914, would lead to an Armageddon. By 1915, disappointment at Kamwana's failed predictions led many of his supporters to drift towards Chilembwe instead.

Although the Commission of Inquiry considered Chilembwe was influenced by the millennial beliefs it described generically as "Watchtower", and he was also associated in the European mind with radical Ethiopianism, Chilembwe was probably influenced by a range of religious ideas, orthodox, millennial, eschatological and even indigenous ones, although the extent of each is unclear. His contacts with millennial congregations were part of an attempt to form alliances with other independent African churches, both orthodox and millennial ones, which were made not purely for religious reasons. In addition, his contacts with orthodox churches were more numerous than those with millennial ones.

McCracken notes the influence of the Church of Scotland Blantyre Mission on several of Chilembwe's principal followers educated there. Others of Chilembwe's educated followers belonged to several congregations and had a range of religious beliefs, Those ordinary Africans considered to be rebels whose denominational allegiances are known belonged either to Chilembwe's Providence Industrial Mission or to Blantyre mission. Although both these normally required several years as a catechumen before baptism, shortly before the uprising, Chilembwe baptised hundreds of newly arrived workers on the Magomero estate. These were apparently potential recruits for an attack on the colonial system with little doctrinal understanding.

In the context of Cobbing's cautionary comments on the "false trail of millenarianism", some at least of Nyasaland's African population were under severe political, social or economic pressures that might be sufficient causes for an attempted rising against colonial rule. It is difficult to say which of these pressures was most acute, but it would also be difficult to rule out a role for millenarianism, even though the evidence is speculative and ambiguous. Any explanation of the causes of the rising and Chilembwe's motivation must consider all the available information and prioritise the most reliable and least speculative sources.

== Sources ==
- L. X. Blumer, (2008). The Kingdom of Heaven Is at Hand: Volume One: A Chronological Presentation, Mustang, Tate. ISBN 978-1-60696-334-0.
- D. S. Bone, (2015). Chilembwe Revisited: A Report on a Symposium to mark the Centenary of the Chilembwe Rising in Nyasaland in 1915. The Society of Malawi Journal, Vol. 68, No. 1.
- J. Cobbing, (1958). The Absent Priesthood: Another Look at the Rhodesian Risings of 1896–1897. The Journal of African History, Vol. 18, No. 1.
- C. Crais, (2002). The Politics of Evil. Cambridge University Press. ISBN 978-0-52110-482-1.
- H. Donati, (2011). "A Very Antagonistic Spirit": Elliot Kamwana: Christianity and the World in Nyasaland. The Society of Malawi Journal, Vol. 64, No. 1.
- K. E. Fields (1985). Revival and Rebellion in Colonial Central Africa, Princeton University Press. ISBN 978-0-69109-409-0.
- M. Garvey (edited. R. A. Hill), (2006). The Marcus Garvey and Universal Negro Improvement Association Papers, Vol. IX: Africa for the Africans, 1921–1922. University of California Press. ISBN 978-0-52020-211-5.
- Y. Gershoni (1997). Africans on African-Americans: The Creation and Uses of an African-American Myth. New York University Press. ISBN 978-0-81473-082-9.
- M. Hokkanen, (2007). Quests for Health and Contests for Meaning: African Church Leaders and Scottish Missionaries in the Early Twentieth Century Presbyterian Church in Northern Malawi. Journal of Southern African Studies, Vol. 33, No. 4.
- H. Langworthy, (1996), "Africa for the African". The Life of Joseph Booth. Blantyre: Christian Literature Association in Malawi. ISBN 9-99081-603-4.
- H. W. Langworthy III, (1986). Joseph Booth, Prophet of Radical Change in Central and South Africa, 1891–1915. Journal of Religion in Africa, Vol 16, No. 1.
- E. LaVerdiere, (1999). The Beginning of the Gospel: Introducing the Gospel According to Mark, Volume 1, Mark 1-8:21. Collegeville, the Liturgical Press. ISBN 0-8146-2478-2.
- J. Linden and I. Linden, (1971). John Chilembwe and the New Jerusalem. The Journal of African History, Vol. 12, No. 4.
- I. Linden with J. Linden, (1974). Catholics, Peasants, and Chewa Resistance in Nyasaland, 1889–1939. University of California Press. ISBN 978-0-52002-500-4
- J. Linden and I. Linden, (1975). Chiefs and Pastors in the Ncheu Rising of 1915, in R J Macdonald (editor), From Nyasaland to Malawi: studies in colonial history. East African Publishing House.
- K. P. Lohrentz, (1971). Joseph Booth, Charles Domingo, and the Seventh Day Baptists in Northern Nyasaland,1910-12. The Journal of African History, Vol. 12, No. 3.
- J. McCracken, (1998). Democracy and Nationalism in Historical Perspective: The Case of Malawi. African Affairs, Vol. 97, No. 387.
- J. McCracken, (2012). A History of Malawi, 1859–1966. Woodbridge, James Currey. ISBN 978-1-84701-050-6.
- B. Morris, (2015). The Chilembwe Rebellion. The Society of Malawi Journal, Vol. 68, No. 1.
- B. Morris (2016). An Environmental History of Southern Malawi. London, Palgrave MacMillan. ISBN 978-3-31945-257-9.
- D. K. Mphande, (2014). Oral Literature and Moral Education among the Lakeside Tonga of Northern Malawi, Oxford, African Books Collective. ISBN 978-9-99080-244-3.
- G. S. Mwase (edited R I Rotberg), (1967). Strike a Blow and Die: A Narrative of Race Relations in Colonial Africa. Harvard University Press. ISBN 978-0-67442-902-4.
- M. E. Page, (1978). The War of Thangata: Nyasaland and the East African Campaign, 1914–1918. The Journal of African History, Vol. 19, No. 1.
- M. J. Penton, (2015). Apocalypse Delayed: The Story of Jehovah's Witnesses, Third Edition. University of Toronto Press. ISBN 978-1-44264-793-0.
- D. D. Phiri, (1999). Let Us Die for Africa: An African Perspective on the Life and Death of John Chilembwe of Nyasaland. Blantyre, Central Africana. ISBN 978-9 99081-419-4.
- R. I. Rotberg, (1965). The Rise of Nationalism in Central Africa: The Making of Malawi and Zambia, 1873–1944. Harvard University Press. ISBN 978-0-67477-191-8.
- R. I. Rotberg, (1970). Psychological Stress and the Question of Identity: Chilembwe's Revolt Reconsidered, in: R. I. Rotberg and A. Mazrui (editors), Protest and Power in Black Africa, Oxford University Press. ISBN 978-0-19500-093-1.
- R. I. Rotberg (2005). John Chilembwe, Brief life of an anticolonial rebel: 1871?-1915. Harvard Magazine, March–April 2005.
- C. T. Russell, (1916). Studies in the Scriptures, Volume 6. International Bible Students Association, p. 209.
- D. J. Selby, (1957). Changing Ideas in New Testament Eschatology. The Harvard Theological Review, Vol. 50, No. 1.
- G Shepperson, (1953). Ethiopianism and African Nationalism. Phylon, Vol. 14, No. 1.
- G. Shepperson, (1954). The Politics of African Church Separatist Movements in British Central Africa, 1892–1916, Journal of the International African Institute, Vol. 24, No. 3,
- G. Shepperson and T. Price, (1958). Independent African. John Chilembwe and the Origins, Setting and Significance of the Nyasaland Native Rising of 1915. Edinburgh University Press.
- G. Shepperson, (1960). Notes on Negro American Influences on the Emergence of African Nationalism. The Journal of African History, Vol. 1, No. 2.
- G. Shepperson, (2015). A Major Chilembwe Letter. The Society of Malawi Journal, Vol. 68, No. 1, pp. vi, 1–2.
- A. Spangler and L. Tverberg, (2018). Sitting at the Feet of Rabbi Jesus. Grand Rapids, Zondervan. ISBN 978-0-31035-041-5.
- R. Tangri, (1968). African Reaction and Resistance to the Early Colonial Situation in Malawi: 1891–1915, Central Africa Historical Association pamphlet 15.
- R. Tangri, (1971). Some New Aspects of the Nyasaland Native Rising of 1915, African Historical Studies, Vol. 4, No. 2.
- T. J. Thompson (2015). Prester John, John Chilembwe and the European Fear of Ethiopianism. The Society of Malawi Journal, Vol. 68, No. 2.
- T. J. Thompson, (2016): Review of ‘Voices from the Chilembwe Rising: Witness testimonies made to the Nyasaland Rising Commission of Inquiry, 1915’. The Society of Malawi Journal, Vol. 69, No. 1.
- T. J. Thompson (2017). Religion and Mythology in the Chilembwe Rising of 1915 in Nyasaland and the Easter Rising of 1916 in Ireland: Preparing for the End Times? Studies in World Christianity, Vol. 23, No. 1.
- J. van Velson, (1966). Some Early Pressure Groups in Malawi, in E Stokes and R Brown, (editors), The Zambezian Past: Studies in Central African History. Manchester University Press.
- L White, (1984). 'Tribes' and the Aftermath of the Chilembwe Rising. African Affairs, Vol. 83, No. 333.
- L. White, (1987). Magomero: Portrait of an African Village, Cambridge University Press. ISBN 978-0-52132-182-2.
- J. F. Zygmunt, (1970). Prophetic Failure and Chiliastic Identity: The Case of Jehovah's Witnesses. American Journal of Sociology, Vol. 75, No. 6.
