= Millenarianism in colonial societies =

Millenarianism is the belief by a religious, social, or political group or movement in a coming fundamental transformation of society, after which "all things will be changed". These movements have been especially common among people living under colonialism or other forces that disrupted previous social arrangements.

The phrase "millennialist movement" has been used by scholars in anthropology and history to describe the common features of these religious phenomena when viewed as social movements, and has most often been used to describe the social movements that have taken place in colonized societies.

Christianity itself can be seen as originating in a millenarian movement among Jewish people living under Roman rule, although its characteristics as a social movement quickly changed as it spread through the Roman Empire.

== Millenarian movements ==
- The Andean Taki Unquy movement of the 1560s and 1570s, opposing the diseases arriving with the Spanish conquerors.
- The presumed death in the battle of Alcácer Quibir of King Sebastian of Portugal in 1578 was not accepted by many Portuguese people, who believed that he would return to lead his kingdom. Their Sebastianism extended to Brazil where the establishment of the secular Republic of Brazil in 1889 led many to believe Sebastian would reappear to restore monarchy.
- The Tepehuán Revolt in 1620s Mexico was an attempt to expel Spanish colonists and priests and to return to traditional ways.
- The 1637–38 Shimabara Rebellion in Japan, including numerous peasants converted to Catholicism.
- The Pueblo Revolt of 1680 in Spanish New Mexico under the religious figure Po'pay.
- The Antonianism movement, a syncretic Catholic movement in the Kingdom of Kongo led by the prophet Kimpa Vita (1704–1708)
- The Cruzob movement, which sought to revive the indigenous Maya religion during the Caste War in the Yucatán Peninsula (1847–1901).
- Tenskwatawa the "Shawnee Prophet", who called for a return to ancestral ways and the defeat of European colonial power from 1805.
- Kuzma Alekseyev, a prophet in Mordovia active in 1806–1810; he taught about a universal kingdom based on a syncretic Christian—Traditional Mordvin religion
- Various Māori millenarian movements in the 19th century in New Zealand.
- Bábism and Baháʼísm, two perennialist movements founded in 1844 and thereafter in Qajar Persia by self-proclaimed prophets.
- The 1854–1858 Xhosa cattle-killing movement of South Africa, led by the prophetess Nongqawuse.
- The God Worshipping Society of the Taiping Rebellion, which fused Anglo-American Protestant Christian and Chinese elements into a movement that focused the resentment of Han Chinese against the ruling Manchu Qing dynasty. Hong Xiuquan, their leader, proclaimed himself to be the second son of God and brother of Jesus Christ, as well as the Tian Zi (Son of Heaven), a sacred title of the Chinese emperor. He would establish the Taiping Heavenly Kingdom, which controlled much of southern China from 1851 to 1864.
- The Revolt of the Muckers in southern Brazil, 1873–1874.
- The 1885–1899 Mahdist State in Sudan, established by Muhammad Ahmad, who proclaimed himself the Mahdi and led a jihad against the Khedive of Egypt's rule over the Sudan and the British Empire.
- The Ghost Dance movement, spreading across western Native Americans in the United states of America in 1890.
- Teresa Urrea, a Sonoran mystic who inspired the 1891–1892 Tomochic Rebellion and the 1896 Yaqui Uprising in North America.
- The Battle of Kuruyuki was the 1892 attempt of the Eastern Bolivian Guarani to combat Christianity and Bolivian settlers.
- Korea's syncretic Donghak Peasant Revolution, 1894–1895.
- Canudos was a folk-Catholic commune in backcountry Bahia, Brazil, brutally crushed in 1897 by the new Brazilian Republic.
- The Righteous Harmony Society during the 1899–1901 Boxer Rebellion was a Chinese movement reacting against Western colonialism.
- The Ahmadiyya movement, an Islamic messianic movement with millenarian elements, founded by Mirza Ghulam Ahmad (d. 1908), who claimed to be the Mahdi and Messiah in British India during the late nineteenth century.
- The Guaycuruan-speaking Toba attempted to regain control of the Gran Chaco in Argentina in 1904.
- Burkhanism was a 1904 Altayan movement led by a visionary; it reacted against Russification.
- The 1905–1907 Maji Maji Rebellion in German East Africa was influenced by an African spirit medium who gave his followers war medicine that he said would turn German bullets into water.
- The 1912–1916 Contestado War in Brazil.
- The 1914 Rapa Nui rebellion on Rapa Nui (Easter Island) inspired by Angata's prophetic visions.
- Chilembwe uprising, a 1915 uprising in Nyasaland led by a Baptist minister, John Chilembwe, with diverse social, political, and spiritual motivations that included some members with millenarian beliefs.
- The Melanesian John Frum cargo cult believed in a return of their ancestors brought by Western technology since the 1930s.
- A number of religious movements in the African diaspora for example, Haitian Vodou, Louisiana Voodoo, Santería, Candomblé, and Hoodoo – syncretise Christian and traditional West African beliefs and practices, sometimes with influence from other traditions such as Native American religions, Islam, Spiritism, or Western esotericism. While these religions are not themselves especially millenarian, they would have a heavy influence on later religious movements in the African diaspora, such as Rastafari, the Nation of Islam, the Nuwaubian Nation, and the Black Hebrew Israelites which do have strong millenarian doctrines. These later movements also greatly emphasise black nationalist identity, present themselves as movements for political as well as spiritual liberation, have a history of encouraging black solidarity and political activism, and have variously been involved in political violence. (Other religious movements in the African diaspora, such as Ethiopianism (a movement among black Americans to adopt Ethiopian Christianity) or the American Society of Muslims (an organisation of black Sunni Muslims, in opposition to the Nation of Islam), may, like these millenarian new religious movements, share an emphasis on black identity, political activism, and community-building, but they also emphasise the teachings of existing religions (Ethiopian Christianity and Sunni Islam, respectively), and so are not millennarian religions.)

== See also ==
- Ethnic religion
- Islamic revival
- Liberation theology
- Millennialism
- New religious movement
- Religious identity
