= Charles Domingo =

Charles Vincente Domingo (c. 1875 – late 1950s) was born in Mozambique but spent most of his life in northern Nyasaland, where he was educated at the Free Church of Scotland (1843–1900) mission at Livingstonia. He later became a teacher and licensed preacher there, but left the Free Church in 1908 over delays to his ordination and he later established an independent Seventh Day Baptist church and school in the Mzimba district. Domingo was one of three Africans sponsored by Joseph Booth who created independent churches in Nyasaland in the early 20th century, the others being John Chilembwe and Elliot Kamwana. Domingo did not favour armed revolt, as Chilembwe did, nor was he a charismatic preacher seeking rapid social change like Kamwana. He was a moderate social reformer who strongly criticised the inequalities of colonial rule, and a teacher who believed that Africans should run their own churches free of external supervision and use these churches to promote a high standard of education to create a cultured African elite, which would undertake its own social and political advancement. He failed because of inadequate resources in the poverty-stricken north of Nyasaland and through government suspicion of his motives, but he remains one of the pioneers of Malawi's independence.

== Early life and education ==
Charles Vincente Domingo was a Kunda born around 1875 in the lower Shire River valley in Mozambique. As a young child, he lived in Quelimane with his father, who was employed there as a cook by the African Lakes Company. He was found in Quelimane in 1881, apparently after his father had died, by the South African Presbyterian evangelist, William Koyi, who was attached to the Livingstonia mission and was returning there from South Africa. Koyi took the boy to the mission and acted as guardian until his death in 1884. Domingo then became a household servant of Dr Robert Laws at Livingstonia, studying in its school and being baptised into the Free Church of Scotland. Through Laws’ efforts, Domingo secured the best education then available in Central Africa, including travelling with Laws to the Lovedale Missionary Institute in South Africa between 1891 and 1894. On his return to Livingstonia, he studied to become a teacher, after which he became the first African teaching assistant in the Livingstonia mission school in 1897. This was followed by further theological studies at the Overtoun Institute in Livingstonia from 1900 to 1902, and he was licensed as a preacher in 1903, serving as preacher and schoolmaster for the next six years.

== Break with the Free Church ==
In 1907, after serving five years’ probation for ordination as a minister, which he considered was long overdue, Domingo was sent to Loudon mission to prepare for ordination under the supervision of Donald Fraser. Domingo had already demonstrated a degree of independence, and found his continued subordination to a European minister intolerable. After a public dispute with Fraser, he left his post in November 1908, travelled to the south of Nyasaland and received baptism from John Chilembwe, effectively ending any connection with what was now the United Free Church of Scotland.

In early 1909, encouraged by Chilembwe, Domingo went to preach in the British Concession of Chinde in Mozambique, a transhipment port for Nyasaland. He stayed for about a year, leaving because he had become ill, because the greater financial support he expected, either from Chilembwe’s Providence Industrial Mission or its American backers, failed to materialised, and also because the Portuguese authorities objected to his activities there.

== Search for an independent church ==
Following his meeting with Chilembwe and, in search for a new religious direction, Domingo corresponded with Charles Taze Russell and, after reading Russell's published writings while in Mozambique, joined the Watch Tower Society in 1909. He established contact with Joseph Booth in South Africa and also corresponded with Elliot Kamwana before the latter was deported from Nyasaland in 1909. On his return to Nyasaland in 1910, Domingo joined the independent Seventh Day Baptist church that Booth’s disciples had formed, and which Booth funded, in the north of the protectorate. There was no clear split between this movement and the Watch Tower Society until the visit of an American representative of the society in late 1910, who was strongly opposed to the doctrine of Sabbatarianism that Booth had promoted. Most of congregations founded by Kamwana supported Watch Tower following his brief and illegal return from his deportation in October 1910, but most of those begun by others of Booth’s disciples rejected Watch Tower control. By 1911, the division between the two groups was total. Despite his earlier membership of the Watch Tower movement, Domingo did not express the sort of millennial expectations entertained by Elliot Kamwana, who predicted the start of the Millennium and the ending of colonial rule in 1914.

From 1910 onward, Domingo made very strong criticisms of European missions, government and companies in his letters, seeing them as the three bodies that combined to oppress Africans. As these letters did not come to the notice of the colonial authorities, he was not regarded as subversive at that time. The authorities regarded the independent Seventh Day Baptist churches with disfavour but, as they did not voice opposition to the government, they were not considered a threat.

Between 1911 and 1915, Domingo was the pastor of a small Seventh Day Baptist congregation that grew only slowly in size as, in contrast to Kamwana, he rejected the mass conversion of converts uninstructed in church beliefs. He established a number of village schools and was himself the teacher of a small number of pupils that he aimed to teach to a high standard, rather than just one of basic literacy, but his educational activities were hampered by local poverty and the shortage of external funding. Initially, support from the American Seventh Day Baptist movement was channelled through Joseph Booth in South Africa, but 1911 and 1912 most of the Nyasaland pastors sought funding directly from America rather than through him, and requested the appointment of a resident missionary. Their intervention led to the American organisation ending its association with Booth and making further financial support conditional on acceptance of a white American missionary with supervisory power over African pastors. Domingo was against this loss of independence, and wished to run his congregation with limited outside financial support, mainly that needed to support his educational scheme, but no supervision. No American missionary was appointed until 1914 and he was ordered to leave the area after a month, so American support for Domingo and other African pastors was minimal.

== After the Chilembwe uprising ==
Domingo had no known connection with the Chilembwe uprising but, in its aftermath, he came under suspicion and his correspondence was intercepted. In January 1916, after replying favourably to a letter from Booth advocating African political representation, he was required to leave Nyasaland and was sent to Chinde as a clerk but was transferred to Zomba in 1917. In 1919, he was allowed to return to Mzimba district, where he worked until 1927 as a government clerk. He then returned to preaching and teaching in the Seventh Day Baptist church until resuming work for the government in 1934. Nothing further is known of his history, except that he occasionally communicated with the Seventh Day Baptists in America until his death some time in the late 1950s.
