= John Gray Kufa =

Nyasaland church leader and associate of John Chilembwe

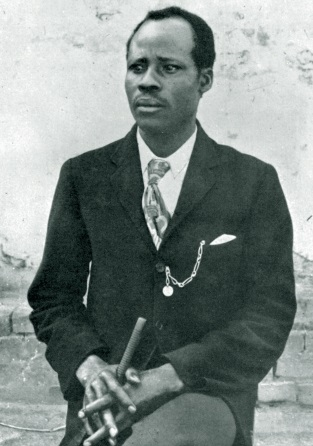
- John Gray Kufa, c. 1910
- Born: 19th century Nyasaland (now Malawi)
- Died: 1915; Nyasaland Protectorate
- Occupations: Church leader, landowner
- Known for: Associate of John Chilembwe and participant in the Chilembwe uprising

John Gray Kufa (died 1915) was a Malawian church leader and African landowner in the British Protectorate of Nyasaland (now Malawi). An outstanding product of the Church of Scotland’s Blantyre Mission, he became one of John Chilembwe’s closest associates and was executed following the Chilembwe uprising of January 1915.

== Early life and mission work ==
The basic details of Kufa's life are known. He was educated and trained at the Blantyre Mission in southern Nyasaland and later established himself as a landowner.

The Blantyre Mission’s superintendent David Clement Scott believed in racial equality and was called a "negrophile" for his outlook (as an insult). Before 1894, Scott picked seven African men to become deacons they were Harry Kambwiri Matecheta, John Macrae Chipuliko, Mungo Murray Chisuse, Thomas Mpeni, James Gray Kamlinje, James Auldearn Mwembe and Kufa. Scott's aim was to increase the role of Africans in the church's leadership, and one woman was also made a deacon.

By the early 1900s, Kufa had worked in the Shire Highlands plantation economy. He left mission employment to serve as a hospital assistant on the Bruce estates at Magomero, bringing him into close contact with local settler agriculture and labour practices.

Kufa was one of several elite Malawians who learned to use and to own a bicycle. These were prestige items that arrived around the turn of the century. The others included Duncan Njilimia, Gordon Mataka, and George Masangano who were all involved in John Chilembwe's later revolt. The bicycles were later plundered and it is speculated that one of these (made of wood) may now be in Birmingham's Thinktank Museum.

== Association with John Chilembwe ==
Kufa was part of the educated African Christian milieu that gathered around John Chilembwe and the Providence Industrial Mission. He was involved in 1909 as was Chilembwe when an Industrial Union was formed in Blantyre. Two years later they formed the African Industrial Society which was said to involve all of the leading Africans in the Shire Highlands. Contemporary testimony and later historical analysis identify him as a prominent lieutenants who supported Chilembwe's revolt of racial indignities and coercive labour practices. Reviewers of the inquiry evidence and subsequent scholarship describe Kufa as one of Chilembwe's few influential African followers.

== Chilembwe Uprising and execution ==
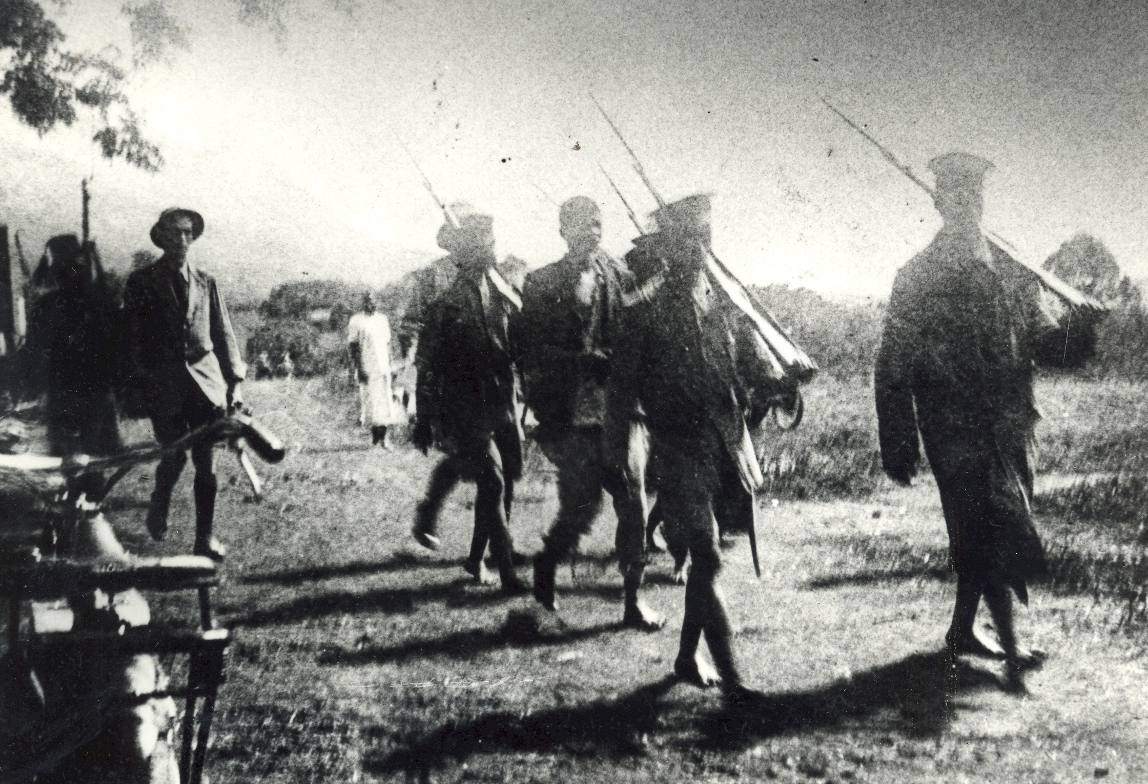
Kufa being led to be hanged in 1915

During the Chilembwe uprising of January 1915, insurgents attacked the Magomero estate headquarters and other targets connected to the colonial economy and administration. The revolt was quickly suppressed; around thirty people were executed and many more imprisoned in the aftermath. Kufa was captured and executed following the uprising.

== Legacy ==
Kufa is remembered in Malawian history as an exemplar of the generation of Blantyre Mission–trained African Christians who pursued landownership and leadership within church and society, and who, in some cases, aligned with Chilembwe's challenge to colonial injustice. His image survives in photographs by Mungo Murray Chisuse.

== See also ==
- John Chilembwe
- Providence Industrial Mission
- Church of Central Africa Presbyterian – Blantyre Synod
- Chilembwe uprising
- Mungo Murray Chisuse
