= Mlonda =

Mlonda (noun) is the Chichewa language word for watchman and may refer to:

- Elliott Kanem Kamwana's "Mlonda Healing Mission" in Malawi
- Hermann von Wissmann (steamship), a steamship on Lake Malawi, known as Mlonda 1920-1950
