= Mungo Murray Chisuse =

Nyasaland/Malawian photographer, early African studio pioneer

- Born: c. late 19th century Nyasaland (now Malawi)
- Died: unknown
- Occupations: Photographer (studio portraiture), organist
- Years active: c. 1900s–1920s
- Known for: Early African studio photography in Nyasaland; portrait of John Chilembwe

Mungo Murray Chisuse was a Nyasaland (now Malawi) photographer and one of the earliest documented African studio photographers in the country. He is widely credited as the author of a well-known portrait of John Chilembwe, the Baptist pastor and anti-colonial leader, an image that later informed Chilembwe’s depiction on Malawian banknotes.

== Biography ==
The Blantyre Mission’s superintendent David Clement Scott believed in racial equality and was called a "negrophile" for his outlook (as an insult). Before 1894, Scott picked seven African men to become deacons they were Harry Kambwiri Matecheta, John Macrae Chipuliko, Thomas Mpeni, James Gray Kamlinje, James Auldearn Mwembe, John Gray Kufa and Chisuse. Scott's aim was to increase the role of Africans in the church's leadership, and one woman was also made a deacon.

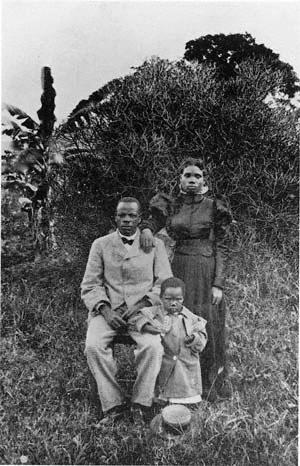
In this photo taken by Mungo Murray Chisuse, husband and wife John and Ida Chilembwe pose with their child, Emma.

By the late 1890s Chisuse appears in records connected to mission circles and modern technologies; research notes that as early as 1897 he and fellow Malawian missionary James Gray Kamlinje visited Scotland and learned to ride bicycles, reflecting the transnational networks in which he moved during the colonial period.

Chisuse established himself in Blantyre, advertising his work as an “African photographer, Blantyre, Nyasaland.” Scholars describe him as not only the first known African photographer in Malawi but also “arguably, the finest portrait photographer ever to have worked in the country.”

Alongside photography, later sources recall Chisuse’s musical contributions, noting his standing as Blantyre’s first African organist—an indicator of his wider cultural role in the town’s public life.

== Work and subjects ==
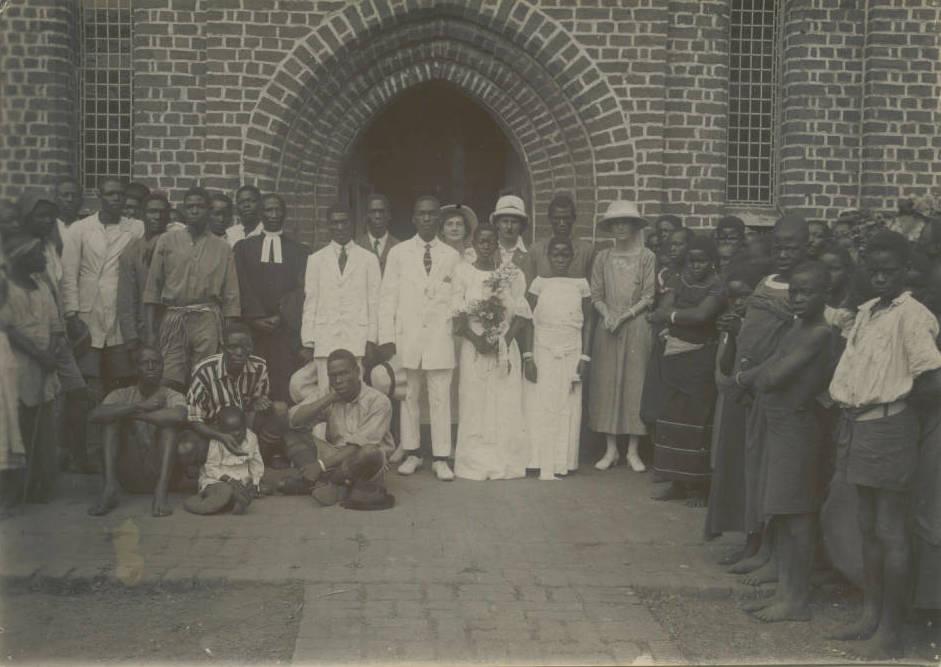
In this photo taken by Chisuse for a wedding at Domasi Church, Malawi, circa 1920-1929

Among his best-known works are images of John Chilembwe and his family. A widely reproduced photograph shows Chilembwe with his wife Ida and their daughter Emma, taken circa 1910 and attributed to Chisuse. Scholarship also links Chisuse’s portrait of Chilembwe to the image later used on Malawian currency.

== Legacy ==
Chisuse occupies a formative place in the history of photography in Malawi, representing an early African-owned practice during a period when the medium was largely controlled by European studios. His surviving photographs are held and circulated in archives and public repositories, and works attributed to him appear in curated collections and online media libraries.

== See also ==
- John Chilembwe
- Providence Industrial Mission
- Church of Central Africa Presbyterian – Blantyre Synod
- John Gray Kufa
- Yao people
