= Alexander Livingstone Bruce =

Alexander Livingstone Bruce (24 October 1881 – 12 February 1954) was a Scottish businessman, investor, military officer, and colonial administrator in Southern Africa.

Bruce was a director and major shareholder of A L Bruce Estates Ltd, one of the largest property owning companies in colonial Nyasaland. After the death of his elder brother in 1915, Alexander Livingstone Bruce had sole control of the company's holdings. Bruce's harsh and exploitative management style is considered to have been a major factor in the outbreak of John Chilembwe's uprising against British rule in 1915, for which Bruce has since been the subject of severe criticism. During the uprising, three of Bruce's European employees were killed and one of them, William Jervis Livingstone was held partly to blame for the revolt. Although Livingstone was carrying out Bruce's orders, Bruce, as a leading landowner and member of the governor's Legislative Council, escaped censure. Despite Bruce's ruthless pursuit of profits, A L Bruce Estates was ultimately unprofitable, but was saved from insolvency in 1949 by the colonial government, which needed its land for resettlement following a famine. Shortly before his death in 1954, Bruce was able to sell the company's Nyasaland estates, repay its debts and realise a surplus.

Bruce's legacy remains highly controversial due to his direct involvement in the European colonization of Africa, from which he derived substantial benefit throughout his career. Indeed, Bruce's racist attitude towards and exploitation of his native workforce was criticised even in his own time.

== Family background ==
Agnes (born 1847, in Chonuane), the daughter of David Livingstone and his wife Mary, married Alexander Low Bruce (born 1839) in 1875, and they had four children. Mr. Livingstone was a son-in-law of David Livingstone, the famed missionary and explorer of Africa, whose travels throughout the continent represented one of the first successful European expeditions in the African interior. The first child was a son, David Livingstone Bruce (1877–1915), the second child was a daughter who died young, the third child and second son was Alexander Livingstone Bruce (born 1881), and the fourth child was a daughter Annie Livingstone Bruce (1883–1954).

His father, Alexander Low Bruce was a master brewer and supported East and Central African commercial and missionary organisations. After his marriage to Agnes Livingstone, he became a director of the African Lakes Company. Though, he never visited Nyasaland, he would obtain title to some 170,000 acres of land there, 162,000 acres of which were concentrated in an estate named Magomero, south of Zomba. On his death on 1893, aged 54, title to his African assets passed under his will to the A L Bruce Trust, whose major beneficiaries were his two sons and, to a lesser extent, his daughter.

Alexander Livingstone Bruce attended the Edinburgh Academy between 1888 and 1894. He was commissioned a second lieutenant in the 16th The Queen's Lancers on 8 May 1901, taking part in the Second Boer War in South Africa, where he was wounded. Following the end of the war, he was promoted to lieutenant on 22 November 1902. As a result of his wartime injuries, he was only capable of walking by using two sticks, although he later attained the rank of Major in the King's African Rifles during the First World War.

Bruce was married to Amy (née Sanderson), the former wife of Roderick Laing who divorced her in 1923. Amy died in 1927, and they had one child, a daughter Diana Livingstone Bruce (born 1927), who in 1963 married the American visual effects creator and producer Ray Harryhausen.

Bruce died on 12 February 1954 in London.

== Life in Nyasaland ==
=== The Magomero Estate ===
Shortly before his death in November 1893, Alexander Low Bruce had appointed two managers for his principal estates in Nyasaland. Initially, Agnes assumed oversight of the A L Bruce Trust until Bruce's heirs, David and Alexander, could take over when they came of age.

The provisions of their father's will expressed the hope on how they would run the estates:

"…in the hope and expectation that they will take an interest in the opening up of Africa to Christianity and Commerce on the lines laid down by their grandfather the late David Livingstone."

In 1908, Alexander Livingstone Bruce moved to Magomero and took over the financial management of the estates. After their mother's death in 1912, and as the Magomero estate showed potential, David Livingstone Bruce and Alexander Livingstone Bruce purchased the assets of the A L Bruce Trust in 1913, paying just over £41,000 for its estates. They then incorporated A L Bruce Estates Ltd in 1913 with a share capital of £54,000, largely held by themselves and their sister Annie. Alexander Low Bruce had urged his two sons to use the landholdings he had acquired for philanthropic purposes.

When Magomero was acquired, it was largely uncultivated and almost completely uninhabited following decades of conflict. The first cash crop tried at Magomero was Arabica coffee in 1895, but after poor crops and a collapse in world coffee prices in 1903, this was abandoned. When Alexander Livingstone Bruce came to live in Nyasaland, the main estate crop was cotton. In 1908, 1,000 acres of a hardy variety of Upland cotton called Nyasaland Upland was planted at Magomero; this was increased to 5,000 acres by 1914. The cultivation of cotton is highly labour intensive and remains so throughout its five to six month growing season. To ensure that sufficient workers were available, estate owners exploited the obligations of a labour tenancy system called thangata, in which African tenants paid for their occupancy on European-owned estates in work, rather than a traditional rent payment. Alexander Livingstone Bruce was said to have pioneered the thangata system, and once Magomero started to grow cotton, Bruce, who lived in Nyasaland and had control of the estate operations, instructed his manager to exploit thangata rigorously. When cotton growing started, the Bruce estates increased the labour demand to four or five months a year, mainly in the growing season, which left tenants little time to grow their food.

=== Official career ===
A Legislative Council was formed in 1907 to advise the Governor of Nyasaland on legislation. Initially, this consisted solely of colonial officials, but from 1909 a minority of nominated "non-official" members was added. Bruce became a provisional non-official member of the Nyasaland Legislative Council in May 1908, and later a full member. He remained as a long-serving member of the Legislative Council and represented the interests of the large estates.

With the outbreak of World War I in August 1914, Bruce was appointed second-in-command of the Nyasaland Volunteer Reserve. He later held a lieutenant's commission in the King's African Rifles during the First World War and was involved in the battle of Karonga in 1915. He was awarded the Croix de Guerre in 1917, and was a promoted to captain and later major in the King's African Rifles and awarded the Military Cross in 1918. Badly injured in the war, Bruce was later described as only able to walk with the aid of sticks.

=== The Chilembwe Uprising ===
John Chilembwe was the pastor of an independent, African-led Baptist church that rejected control by European missionaries. Chilembwe sought social, economic and political advancement for Africans, and his frustration at their being denied political or economic enfranchisement, as well as anger over African casualties in the First World War moved him to change his tactics from peaceful protest to violent resistance in 1915. At the time of the uprising, Alexander Livingstone Bruce was serving with the King's African Rifles and was based at Karonga, but he returned to the south of Nyasaland in its aftermath and took part in the later phases of its suppression. Chilembwe's mission was close to Magomero, and he provoked confrontation with the estate's owner and its manager by erecting churches and schools on estate land without their permission.

Alexander Livingstone Bruce, as a director and major shareholder of A L Bruce Estates Ltd, was responsible for the company's operations in Nyasaland and its policies toward tenants. Livingstone could not have acted without Bruce's approval, and Bruce used Livingstone and other European employees to enforce his orders, tacitly approving of the often brutal methods they used to do this. Bruce also believed that educated Africans had no place in colonial society, whose African members should be restricted to the status of rural peasants. He opposed African education and noted, before the outbreak of the rebellion, his personal dislike for Chilembwe as a potentially disruptive educated African. He considered Chilembwe's churches as centres for agitation, and that by building them on the estates themselves, Chilembwe was making a claim to part of its land and threatening its profits. Bruce (who had absolute control over estate policy) ordered his manager, William Jervis Livingstone, to destroy the schools and churches that Chilembwe had built on his estate. As a result, it was Livingstone rather than Bruce that became the focus for Chilembwe's grievances, resulting in his being specifically targeted during the uprising. Alexander Livingstone Bruce, as a director and major shareholder of A L Bruce Estates Ltd, had complete charge of the company's operations in Nyasaland and its policies toward tenants.

In the Legislative Council, Alexander Livingstone Bruce noted that most of those who took part in the Chilembwe rising were mission educated, and he advocated the closure of all the schools in Nyasaland that had African teachers. During the official enquiry into Chilembwe's uprising, held in June 1915, other landowners gave evidence placing blame on the missionaries, without distinguishing between European-led and independent missions. European missionaries, in contrast, emphasised the purported dangers posed by African-led churches outside of European supervision, such as Chilembwe's. The official enquiry's conclusion blamed Chilembwe for his mixture of political and religious teaching, but also the unsatisfactory conditions on the Bruce Estates and its unduly harsh regime of William Jervis Livingstone. Alexander Livingstone Bruce escaped censure, although the local Resident told the official enquiry considering the revolt that the conditions imposed on the A L Bruce Estates were illegal and oppressive.

=== Later life ===
William Jervis Livingstone was killed because of the severity of the A L Bruce Estates management and policies which he was ordered to enforce. Following the uprising, the protectorate government tried to replace thangata with cash rents. However, Alexander Livingstone Bruce led estate owners in protesting the reform, threatening massive evictions if this change were implemented. The government backed down thangata remained. Even after Livingstone's killing, the work obligations on the A L Bruce Estates was little modified, sometimes amounting to six months a year.

A L Bruce Estates Ltd was under-capitalised throughout its existence and almost never made a profit except immediately after the First World War. After 1925, the company never again made a trading profit, and over the following 15 years, its cumulative deficit rose to over £72,000, which Alexander Livingstone Bruce paid for using his own money. Although other owners largely gave up on attempting to manage inherently unprofitable estates, Bruce stubbornly persisted.

In the 1930s, Livingstone Bruce hatched a new scheme to reverse the fortunes of his enterprise, through his new manager, Captain Kincaid-Smith, who negotiated a contract to supply tobacco grown at Magomero to West Africa. In order to fulfil the contract, Kincaid-Smith resorted to preventing tenants from growing food crops and expelling those who failed to meet their quotas, both of which constituted illegal actions, as well as underpaying them for the tobacco grown. All of this was reminiscent of William Jervis Livingstone and, as was the case with in 1915 with Livingstone, Kincaid-Smith paid the price of following Bruce's instructions while Bruce escaped official censure. Rather than allow Kincaid-Smith to provoke an outright revolt, the Nyasaland government ordered his expulsion from Nyasaland in 1939.

Alexander Livingstone Bruce was reported as living permanently in Edinburgh in 1940, having left Nyasaland and retired, although the date on which he finally departed is uncertain. After the departure of Kincaid-Smith, Bruce gave up his attempts to manage its estates actively, and by 1948 they were described as having many tenants who produced all its crops, with the owner essentially functioning as their broker rather than their direct supervisor.

In 1945, Bruce announced that A L Bruce Estates Ltd wished to sell Magomero. A government survey of the estate showed that the land had been badly managed, deforested, and thoroughly degraded, that its soil had lost fertility. Nevertheless, the Governor felt it was necessary to buy the land. Bruce wanted a figure that would wipe-out its accumulated losses since 1925, but the Governor considered this asking price to be far too much and promptly ended negotiations. In 1947 the company provisionally agreed to sell Magomero to a private buyer at a price of £80,000. However, this sale fell through, leaving Bruce feeling outraged.

A L Bruce Estates Ltd made incured substantial losses in 1948 and 1949, and by the end of that decade was virtually insolvent. However, the government's need for land for re-settlement after the 1949 famine caused it to restart negotiations with Bruce. Some of the estate was sold to private buyers, but around 75,000 acres was bought by the government in 1952, much of which was of poor quality. These land sales made good the past deficits, and before he died in 1954, Alexander Livingstone Bruce saw the completion of the sale of the estate his father had acquired almost 60 years before. Although Alexander's daughter, Diana Livingstone Bruce, opposed the liquidation of the company and prolonged the process for five years in disputes with other shareholders, the company was wound-up as a solvent entity in 1959.

== Published Sources ==
- J McCracken, (2012). A History of Malawi, 1859–1966 Woodbridge, James Currey . ISBN 978-1-84701-050-6.
- P Charlton, (1993). Some Notes on the Nyasaland Volunteer Reserve, The Society of Malawi Journal Vol. 46, No. 2.
- L. White, (1987). Magomero: Portrait of an African Village, Cambridge University Press. ISBN 0-521-32182-4
- C Baker, (1996). The Nyasaland Legislative Council May 1909, The Society of Malawi Journal Vol. 49, No. 1.
- R. Tangri, (1971). Some New Aspects of the Nyasaland Native Rising of 1915, African Historical Studies, Vol. 4, No. 2.
- G. Shepperson and T. Price, (1958). Independent African. John Chilembwe and the Origins, Setting and Significance of the Nyasaland Native Rising of 1915. Edinburgh University Press.
- L. White, (1984). 'Tribes' and the Aftermath of the Chilembwe Rising, African Affairs, Vol. 83, No. 333,
- R. I. Rotberg, (1965). The Rise of Nationalism in Central Africa: The Making of Malawi and Zambia 1873–1964, Cambridge (Mass), Harvard University Press,
