= African Christian Union =

African Christian Union was an organization proposed in Natal by Joseph Booth in 1896 to establish industrial missions that were intended to be the initial phase of a vast programme of African development, managed by Africans. The proposal was seriously discussed by Zulu leaders, however was ultimately rejected.
