= Joseph Booth (missionary) =

- Born: 1851; Derby, England
- Died: 1932 (aged 80–81)
- Occupation: Missionary

Joseph Booth (1851–1932) was an English missionary working in British Central Africa (present-day Malawi) and South Africa. In his 30s, Booth abandoned his career as a businessman and, for the rest of his life, he undertook missionary work for several Christian denominations including Baptist, Seventh Day Baptist and Seventh-day Adventist churches, and he was appointed a missionary by the Watch Tower Bible and Tract Society of Pennsylvania. Throughout his successive ministries, his defining beliefs were a radical egalitarianism, including a scheme of "Africa for the Africans"’ and, from 1898, Seventh-Day Sabbath (Sabbatarian) observance.

== Early career ==
=== Britain and Australia ===
Little is known of Booth's childhood, but his mother died when he was twelve and his three elder sisters brought him up. His father was a Unitarian, but by the age of fourteen Booth questioned his father's religious beliefs and, as he could not live with those beliefs, he left home. Over the next few years, Booth educated himself through extensive reading and, before he was twenty, he turned to the Baptist Church. He married his first wife, Mary Jane née Sharpe, (who he first met on 1868) in 1872. He also adopted radical ideas about politics, economics and society. In 1880, Booth emigrated first to Auckland, New Zealand, and then to Melbourne, Australia, where he became a successful businessman. His business success helped to develop his later views on self-reliance and the economic basis of missionary work. From 1886, Booth became more active in his local Baptist Church and more fundamental in his beliefs. In 1891 he was challenged by an atheist to practice what he preached, to sell all his goods and go to preach the word. He sold his business and, in July 1891, he agreed to become a missionary in East Africa. Despite the death of his first wife, Mary Jane, in Melbourne in October 1891, he left Australia with his two young children and started his missionary career, choosing to work in Africa. He aimed to set up the type of self-supporting Baptist mission that William Carey had pioneered in India, combining teaching and commercial activities.

=== In Nyasaland ===
Booth first came to Africa in 1892 with his two children, Edward (who died of malaria aged 19 in 1896) and Emily, and worked to establish the Zambezi Industrial Mission at Mitsidi, close to Blantyre in the recently proclaimed British Central Africa Protectorate. As the mission needed to become self-supporting, Booth decided to locate it close to the existing commercial centre and market of Blantyre. Although the foundation of the Zambezi Industrial Mission is often dated from 1892, the land for the mission was purchased in 1893 and its main buildings came into use in 1894. Booth also founded the Nyasa Industrial Mission in 1893, the Baptist Industrial Mission in 1895 and several others in later years. He organised or supported several other schemes with similar aims including the African Christian Union, the British Christian Union, and the British African Congress. At the Zambezi Industrial Mission, he recruited local farmers to plant coffee, and within a year a significant acreage of that crop was being grown. Before 1896, Booth made no dramatic calls for political or social change: he was more concerned with establishing and running the missions and raising financial support in Britain. However, his experiences during this period increased his awareness of colonial issues. This was to influence his later advocacy of Africa for the native Africans instead of for Europeans, a view unpopular with colonial authorities and most European missionaries of the time.

Although he began a number of institutions some of which, including the Zambezi Industrial Mission, survive today as the missions or local churches in Malawi, other institutions he founded failed. After setting these institutions up, Booth usually did not remain with them for long, and their survival was due to their own efforts. The failure of the others was often caused by lack of finance, natural disasters or deficient personnel, factors Booth could not control. However, some institutional failures arose from Booth's weaknesses including his restlessness and his inability to compromise with any lack of commitment by his colleagues or the failures of society. By 1896 Booth's disagreements with his colleagues over finance, doctrine and especially African independence led to him ending of his associations with the Zambezi Industrial Mission and the Nyasa Industrial Mission. In March 1896, Booth married his second wife, Annie née Watkins, during a short visit to Britain. She accompanied him to Central Africa, where their daughter, Mary Winifred, was born in 1898.

=== Chilembwe and sabbatarianism ===
He made a trip to Britain and the United States in 1897, taking along his former household servant, John Chilembwe. Chilembwe stayed in Virginia to study as a Baptist pastor and later returned to Nyasaland where he founded the Providence Industrial Mission, following the model set by Booth's industrial missions, and led the Chilembwe uprising in 1915. By 1898, Booth had become a convinced Sabbatarian, which became one of the guiding principles for the rest of his life, and he turned to the Seventh Day Baptists to support his missionary activities. Booth returned to Central Africa in 1899 and established the Plainfield Industrial Mission in Thyolo District for the Seventh Day Baptists. This was named after the Plainfield Seventh Day Baptist Church in New Jersey which had funded it. In 1900 Booth succeeded in establishing a short-lived institute to produce African leaders for the Seventh Day Baptist Church. Two years later, the institute was discontinued, although Booth pointed out that the existing elementary schools could not produce African pastors, and the production of African church leaders was essential to promoting African development.

Booth continued his pro-African efforts, producing a petition in 1899 to the commissioner Alfred Sharpe, which demanded that the whole protectorate should revert to African control in 21 years and that all of the Hut tax revenue should be spent on African education, including higher education for at least five percent of Africans. These views did not go over well with the colonial administration, and Sharpe tried to arrest and deport Booth for his "seditious remarks". Before this could happen, Booth escaped to Mozambique, remaining there until in 1900 Sharpe allowed Booth to return subject to a promise not to take part in political activities.

This set-back prompted Booth to leave Nyasaland for South Africa in 1901. After becoming a Seventh-day Adventist in Cape Town in 1902, Booth went to the United States and convinced the Seventh-day Adventist church of Plainfield, New Jersey to fund the establishment of a mission near Blantyre. This mission, originally called Plainfield mission and later renamed Malamulo, was on the site of the Seventh Day Baptist mission established by Booth, which the Seventh-day Adventists purchased. Booth's stay with the Seventh-day Adventists at Malamulo mission ended after six months, as his colleagues did not accept his radical views, and criticised him for their political implications.

=== Leaving Nyasaland ===
Booth left Nyasaland for the last time in 1902, travelling first to Durban, which he left in February 1903, to travel to Britain. Booth was officially barred from returning to the Nyasaland in 1907.

== Later career ==
=== Changing denominations ===
Booth remained in Britain until late 1906, as the Adventists were unwilling to send him back to Africa and the Church of Christ turned him down as a missionary because his political views were too radical. While in Scotland in 1906, Booth became familiar with the writings of Charles Taze Russell, a prominent Christian restorationist columnist and founder of the Bible Student movement, later known as the Watch Tower Society. In late 1906, journeyed to the United States and met Russell in New York. Russell's Watch Tower Society appointed Booth as a missionary

As Booth was banned from returning to Nyasaland, he went in 1907 to Cape Town, where he planned to train African evangelists to establish largely independent churches in their home areas that would be only loosely overseen by Booth and financed from America. Booth again met Elliot Kamwana, who was living in South Africa, in Cape Town in 1907, and instructed him in a mixture of Booth's sabbatarian beliefs and Watch Tower Society doctrines in preparation for Kamwana's missionary work in Nyasaland. Between 1906 and 1909, he brought at least seven trainee evangelists from northern Nyasaland. Booth instructed them for periods of four to eight months and taught them a mixture of his own sabbatarian beliefs and Watch Tower Society doctrines. Upon their return to Nyasaland, Booth's own role was limited to sending them monthly payments and bibles and other literature provided by the Watch Tower Society . Booth preached his doctrine of Africa for the Africans in public in Cape Town, which gained him some notoriety. He combined Watch Tower millennialism with an insistence on the seventh day: this ultimately led to his expulsion from the Watch Tower Society in late 1909, after Russell had tried to convince Booth to stop his seventh-day preaching.

=== Disciples in Nyasaland ===
Before his break with the Watch Tower Society, Booth had directed Kamwana to return to Nkhata Bay in Nyasaland where he baptised and converted about ten thousand people to the Watchtower movement, which combined Watch Tower Society teaching, sabbatarian practices and addressing his audiences' concerns about witchcraft, in a few months in late 1908 and early 1909. These activities led to his deportation. The other evangelists generally returned in 1909 and 1910, initially to set up Watchtower congregations but, after an inspection visit by an American Watch Tower Society official in 1910 considered their sabbatarian practices unacceptable, they formed an independent Seventh-day Baptist church, which Booth supported financially and with Adventist books. Other sections of the indigenous Watchtower movement after the 1910 split became the Watchtower movement in Central Africa, now known as "Waticitawala" or "Kitawala" (a local term for "Tower") in Congo.

Another disciple of Booth based in Nyasaland, Charles Domingo, who was educated at the Livingstonia mission but left in 1908 when he was refused ordination. He joined Watch Tower in 1908 and received funding for his activities from Booth until Booth was deported in 1909, and he became a Seventh-day Baptist in 1910. Joseph Booth and Charles Domingo edited a periodical, the African Sabbath Recorder, for Seventh Day Baptists in 1911 and 1912, issues of which can now be viewed at the Seventh Day Baptist Historical Library and Archives in Janesville, Wisconsin and at the Library of the University of Malawi in Zomba.

Booth predicted that by 1914 Europeans no longer would rule Africa, but that there would be democracy, African self-rule and unity with American Blacks. These teachings, his criticism of taxation, and the suspicion of Booth because his associate, Elliot Kamwana, had been arrested and deported from Nyasaland, led to his deportation from the Transvaal in mid-1909, although he was able to remain in the British-ruled parts of South Africa, living firstly in Cape Town and from 1914 in Basutoland where he was a Seventh-day Baptist missionary.

Referring to Booth and his African associate Elliot Kamwana, a 1976 Watch Tower publication noted, "they never became Bible Students or Jehovah's Christian witnesses. Their relationship with the Watch Tower Society was short and superficial." Booth's teachings included advocating for social change, in contradiction to the Watch Tower literature he distributed. Particularly in the case of Booth, who had a three-year association with, was appointed as a missionary by and financed by, Watch Tower, these comments appears disingenuous and misleading.

=== Deportation and later years ===
In 1915, Booth produced a British African Congress petition, demanding that educated Africans should have the same political rights as Europeans, and was again deported from South Africa in October 1915. Over the next few years in England, he was involved in pacifist protest against the First World War.

He was allowed to return to South Africa in 1919, to live in the house his younger daughter, Mary Winifred Booth Sales, had built some considerable distance from Cape Town, which discouraged him from any active involvement in African affairs. Booth's second wife died there in 1921, and he married his third wife, Lillian in May 1924 when he was 73 and she was about 49. Booth and his third wife later returned to England because of his ill health and because Booth's contacts with Africans were attracting the attention of the authorities.

Booth remained in England, suffering periodic illness, until he died on 4 November 1932 at the age of 82 at his home in Weston super Mare. His death certificate gives the cause of death as carcinoma of the stomach. He was buried at Milton Cemetery in Lower Weston super Mare, where his third wife, Lilian, was buried with him twenty years later in 1952.

His elder daughters, Emily Booth Langworthy, would write in 1952 of their experiences in Africa in her memoir "This Africa was Mine".

== Bibliography ==
- H. Donati, (2011). "A Very Antagonistic Spirit': Elliot Kamwana: Christianity and the World in Nyasaland". The Society of Malawi Journal, Vol. 64, No. 1.
- K. Fiedler, (1994) The Story of Faith Missions, OCMS. ISBN 978-1-87034-518-7.
- K. E. Fields, (1985). Revival and Rebellion in Colonial Central Africa, Princeton University Press. ISBN 978-0-69109-409-0.
- O. J. M. Kalinga and C. A. Crosby, (2001). Historical Dictionary of Malawi, 3rd ed. Scarecrow Press. ISBN 0-8108-3481-2
- H. W. Langworthy III, (1986). "Joseph Booth, Prophet of Radical Change in Central and South Africa, 1891-1915," Journal of Religion in Africa, Vol. 16, 1.
- H. Langworthy, (1996), Africa for the African: The Life of Joseph Booth. Blantyre: CLAIM. ISBN 99908-16-03-4.
- K. P. Lohrentz (1971). "Joseph Booth, Charles Domingo, and the Seventh Day Baptists in Northern Nyasaland, 1910-12," The Journal of African History, Vol. 12, No. 3.
- R I. Rotberg, (1965). The Rise of Nationalism in Central Africa: The Making of Malawi and Zambia, 1873-1964. Cambridge (Mass), Harvard University Press.ISBN 0-8108-3481-2)
- G. Shepperson and T. Price, (1958). Independent African. John Chilembwe and the Origins, Setting and Significance of the Nyasaland Native Rising of 1915. Edinburgh University Press. ISBN 978-0-85224-002-1.
- D. Stuart-Mogg, (1998). The Grave of Joseph Booth, The Society of Malawi Journal, Vol. 51, No. 2, pp. 33–6.
