= Elliot Kenan Kamwana =

Malawian Christian prophet

Elliot Kenan Kamwana Achirwa, also known as Masokwa Elliot Kenan Kamwana Chirwa or Elliot Kenan Kamwana Msokwa Chirwa, generally known as Elliot Kenan Kamwana (c. 1872–1956), was an African Prophet in Nyasaland (now Malawi) who sought rapid social change and who introduced the Watch Tower movement (later known as the Jehovah's Witnesses) into Central Africa and popularized it there. He was one of three Africans sponsored by Joseph Booth, an English missionary who created independent churches in Nyasaland in the early 20th century, the other two being John Chilembwe and Charles Domingo. Unlike Chilembwe, Kamwana did not favour armed revolt as he was a pacifist, but he was more radical in his quest for rapid African advancement than the more moderate Domingo. The independent church he created, the "Mlonda", or Watchman Healing Mission, ended all links with the Watch Tower movement in the United States in 1937. Some daughter churches split from Mlonda after Kamwana's death in 1956, but it still exists in several Central African countries.

== Early life and education ==
Elliot Kenan Kamwana was a Tonga born in Mpopomeni village, Mzimba District in 1872. His father had been a tribal chief who was murdered, and Kamwana suffered a dislocated childhood as he continually fled with his mother from Ngoni raids. The forename "Masokwa" is not given in many sources, but may have been added in childhood following the death of a prominent relative, and this and the additional surname "Achirwa" otherwise "Chirwa" are frequently omitted, so he is generally known as Elliot Kenan Kamwana.

He was educated at the Free Church of Scotland (1843–1900) mission and school at Bandawe and the United Free Church of Scotland Livingstonia mission between 1898 and 1901, distinguishing himself as a scholar. He later stated he left the church in 1901 because he was frustrated by the church’s restrictions on would-be African members, including long delays in baptising them and in protest against the introduction of school fees in 1901 He had also failed in his repeated attempts to attain baptism, and a Scottish minister later claimed, after Kamwana had returned to Nyasaland as an independent preacher, that he had been refused baptism and later excommunicated for immorality. Immediately after leaving Livingstonia, Kamwana intended to travel to South Africa for work, but an outbreak of smallpox in Southern Rhodesia forced him to delay his journey until 1902. Kamwana may have been baptised as a Seventh Day Baptist in 1902 before leaving Nyasaland and may also have met Joseph Booth at the time, or both may have happened later in South Africa, where he experiencing the harsh conditions experienced by migrant labour when he worked as a hospital attendant and also preached.

== Relationship with Watch Tower ==
He met an itinerant preacher, Joseph Booth, in Cape Town in 1907, who introduced him to Charles Russell’s Watch Tower teachings and instructed Kamwana in a mixture of his own sabbatarian beliefs and Watch Tower doctrines for eight months. Kamwana was not ordained, as the Watch Tower movement does not have a distinct clergy.

He subsequently returned to the Nkhata Bay area of northern Nyasaland in late 1908, where the appearance in August 1907 of a comet, minor earthquakes and, just before his arrival, an outbreak of smallpox were apocalyptic signs that set the stage for Kamwana's ministry. He preached the Watch Tower millennial message, attracting huge crowds, mainly of his own Tonga people, and offered baptism and entrance to the church, bypassing the restricted entry procedures imposed by European missionaries that required basic literacy and a two-year preparation before baptism and involved threats of exclusion for disciplinary breaches, as judged by the missionaries. Approximately 10,000 people were baptised under his direction: he may have succeeded because his teaching addressed his audiences' concerns about witchcraft, concerns that European missionaries did not recognise. At first, the colonial authorities considered this as a purely church issue, until the missionaries represented to the governor that Kamwana’s millennial doctrine that all government but Christ’s would cease was seditious, and he was arrested after six months of preaching in April 1909.

== Deportation and return ==
Fearful of Kawmana's actions, the British colonial authorities arrested him and first imprisoned him in Zomba then in 1910 deported him to South Africa, but in October 1910 he made a brief and illegal return from his deportation to prevent the congregations he had founded by Kamwana supported from rejecting Watch Tower control and joining the Seventh Day Baptist community. The governor therefore decided to detain him in the Mulanje district of southern Nyasaland where he could be kept under observation and where the local people spoke a language dissimilar to his Tonga mother tongue. In order to keep in touch with the Watch Tower congregations free of police scrutiny, he later he moved to Chinde in Portuguese East Africa in 1911, remaining there and preaching until arrested and briefly imprisoned by the Portuguese authorities in 1914, after which he returned to detention in Mulanje.

With meteor showers and the outbreak of the War in 1914, Kamwana's predictions of the dawning of the millennium in October 1914 seemed about to be realised. However, when Kamwana’s prediction of the date of the millennium proved incorrect, many of his supporters rejected his leadership and turned to John Chilembwe and armed revolt. Kamwana was a pacifist and condemned the Chilembwe uprising.

After he had returned to Nyasaland and was imprisoned there, his brother was caught attempting to smuggle 'subversive' letters and Watch Tower pamphlets to Kamwana. He was exiled without trial to Mauritius in 1916 and then the Seychelles where he remained until he was finally allowed to return in 1937. In exile he continued to disseminate millenarian teachings, writing apocalyptic letters to his followers in Central South East Africa in the style of John of Patmos.

== Break with Watch Tower and later life ==
Although the Watch Tower churches initiated by Kamwana in northern Nyasaland and spread by his followers to other parts of the protectorate and to Northern Rhodesia received some funding and publications from the American Watch Tower Bible and Tract Society until 1925, after that date the American organisation disavowed these and tried to forbid them from using the Watch Tower name. When Kamwana was eventually allowed to return to Nyasaland in 1937, he initiated the Mlondo or Watchman Healing Mission, an African initiated church entirely independent of the Watch Tower Society, with its own rituals and scriptural interpretations, although many of its members still read the Watch Tower Society's magazines. Kamwana remained its leader and promoted daughter churches in Tanganyika and the Belgian Congo in addition to those in Nyasaland and Northern Rhodesia before his death in 1956. At the time of his death, his church had about 4,000 members, about half in Nyasaland or migrants from there, but it split after his death on regional lines.
