= Zambezi Industrial Mission =

Independent Baptist mission in Malawi

The Zambesi Industrial Mission was an independent Baptist mission founded in British Central Africa, now Malawi, in 1892 by Joseph Booth, an independent and radical clergyman whose aim was to create a self-supporting mission providing African converts with the educational, technical and economic skills to lead the development of their country towards independence. After disagreements with his colleagues, Booth left the mission in 1897, but it continued as a largely self-supporting Industrial mission until the coffee blight in 1929. After this, it continued as a conventional mission church with growing numbers of congregations and members. After Malawi became independent, the work of the mission church was split into a locally led and funded Zambezi Evangelical Church, partnered by a UK-headquartered Zambesi Mission with a local Blantyre office. In 2010, for the first time, a Malawian was appointed to the post of Blantyre-based ZM Field Director. In 2012, the church had about 150 clergy serving over 500 congregations with 100,000 members in Malawi, and was governed by a national Synod meeting bi-annually.

== The Industrial Mission Concept ==
The idea of a self-supporting mission was pioneered in India by William Carey, a Baptist minister and founder of the Baptist Missionary Society. This combined missionary evangelism and teaching with agriculture and commercial activities. The Industrial Mission movement in Africa arose in the late 19th century because many missionaries considered that European mine-owners, planters, and traders treated Africans mainly as a source of cheap manual labour, and did not want them educated or trained beyond what was necessary to perform routine tasks. Industrial missions wished to combine industrial training with Christian teaching and thought that practical training, rather than an education which would turn-out clerks or book-keepers in subordinate positions, would be more likely to promote African development. After training in European agricultural methods to produce economic crops, or in useful crafts such as carpentry or making clothes and shoes and mechanical trades, it was expected that those it trained would remain with the mission, allowing it to become self-supporting. The aim of Industrial missions was to help Africans live successfully in their own society, not as wage labourers or sharecroppers dependent on European businesses. However, the main Christian denominations expected that their Industrial missions would be superintended by European missionaries.

== Joseph Booth and the founding of Zambesi Industrial Mission ==
=== Booth’s background ===
Joseph Booth was born in Derby, England, in 1852. He left home aged 14 and, in the following years, educated himself through extensive reading, which led him to adopt radical ideas about politics, economics and society. Before he was twenty, he joined the Baptist Church, and he married for the first time in 1872. In 1880, Booth emigrated first to Auckland, New Zealand and later to Melbourne, Australia (1887) where he became a successful businessman. He belonged to Brighton Baptist Church, became a deacon there and then resigned from that position to become a street evangelist, and engaged with the Atheist leader Joseph Symes in regular debates in Symes "Hall of Science". In 1891, as suggested by his wife Mary Jane's dream, he decided to sell his business to become missionaries. Despite the death of his wife, he left Australia with his two young children to start his missionary career, choosing to work in Africa.

Booth obtained funds from British supporters to set up an independent interdenominational mission in the newly created British Central Africa protectorate. By the time he arrived there in 1892 with his daughter Emmy, he was already 40, a radical and independently minded missionary. He was immediately critical of the reluctance of the Scottish Presbyterian mission at Blantyre to admit Africans as full church members, Even before establishing the Zambesi Industrial Mission, Booth had a vision of African churches independent of European control. These self-supporting industrial missions would train African pastors who would take over their running and in turn set-up new industrial missions. His aim was not just to convert but to develop educational and economic skills, so that African converts could lead the development of their own country and support the local church. Booth made his egalitarian outlook explicit: all men were brothers. All the missions that he founded focused on the equality of all worshippers.

=== Founding the Mission ===
In 1892, Booth started with no site or buildings for his mission and initially no staff but with funds from Britain. As the mission needed to become self-supporting, Booth decided to locate it close to the existing commercial centre and market of Blantyre. Although the legal foundation of the Zambesi Industrial Mission dates from 1892, the land for the mission was purchased in 1893 and its main buildings came into use in 1894. The only African who obtained a Certificates of Claim (equivalent to a freehold title) to land as part of the colonial land settlement was Kumtaja, who had bought 37,947 acres of land in 1888 and 1891. In 1893 Kumtaja sold 26,537 acres to Joseph Booth. This became the site of the 'Michiru Estate' of the Zambesi Industrial Mission, which stretched from the Mudi to the Likabula rivers with its headquarters at Mitsidi Station atop Sanjika Hill. Booth transferred the title of this land to the charity which controlled the mission when he left in 1897.

Booth also founded the Nyassa Industrial Mission in 1893 near Blantyre, which later became the Evangelical Church of Malawi. He then founded the Baptist Industrial Mission in 1895 near Ntcheu, and in later years he organised or supported several others mission schemes, including the African Christian Union, the British Christian Union, and the British African Congress. Although some of institutions he began, including the Zambesi Industrial Mission, survive today as missions or local churches in Malawi, others failed. After setting these institutions up, Booth usually did not remain with them for long, so their later survival was due to their own efforts. The failure of the others was often caused by lack of finance, natural disasters, or deficient personnel, factors Booth could not control. However, some failures arose from Booth's weaknesses, including his restlessness and his inability to compromise with any lack of commitment or failures by his colleagues.

=== The Mission under Booth’s leadership ===
Under Booth, the Zambesi Industrial Mission mainly taught agricultural skills, notably the growing of coffee, which was the main export crop of British Central Africa until a slump in coffee prices in 1905. It also taught a variety of crafts. The mission provided opportunities for African advancement, and Booth came into conflict with the Scottish missions in 1893 and 1894 over attracting their trained converts with higher pay, which encouraged their other workers to demand higher levels of pay. Booth was accused of paying workers 18 shillings per month when the ordinary rate was 3 shillings and, in one instance, paying 45 shillings for a person whose previous monthly wage with the Blantyre Church of Scotland had been seven shillings and sixpence.

Despite Booth's moderate success in developing the industrial part of the mission and his vision of the Zambesi Industrial Mission as an independent, self-supporting mission, it soon came under the control of a British missionary charity. This funded two missionaries from Britain and supplied cash for expansion, which reduced the mission's independence. By 1896 Booth's disagreements with his missionary colleagues over finance, doctrine and especially African independence led to him to end of his associations with the Zambesi Industrial Mission and also the Nyasa Industrial Mission

=== Later Developments ===
After Booth left, the Zambesi Industrial Mission underwent a period of quiet expansion in the early decades of the 20th century. At first, it was largely self-supporting, but after the coffee blight in 1929, it could no longer support its activities largely from its own income. In 1930, its British board ended its status as an Industrial Mission and it then largely relied on funding from Britain. After this change, the mission concentrated on pastoral work and providing Bible College training for intending ministers, but the word 'industrial' was only officially dropped from the mission's title in 1939.

At Malawi's independence in 1964, some of the activities of Zambesi Mission (principally the mission schools) were largely taken over by the new government. Others (principally the churches and health centres) came under the direct control of the recently formed and Malawian governed Zambezi Evangelical Church, with Malawians largely replaced ordained and lay mission workers from overseas. Since independence, the UK headquartered Zambesi Mission has remained a key partner supporting ZEC in fulfilling ZEC's mission in Africa. Nevertheless, it was not until 2010 that Malawians were appointed to the ZM roles of field director (with overall responsibility for the mission's work in Africa) and projects coordinator.

The headquarters of Zambezi Evangelical Church still has the name Mitsidi but is now located near the village Sigelegi after the mission was obliged to relocate in 1971 to make way for the new presidential palace. Zambezi Evangelical Church continues to serve Malawi through churches, clinics and schools. In 2012, the church had about 150 clergy serving over 500 congregations with 100,000 members. Together with ZM, it was a founder member and still supports the Evangelical Bible College of Malawi for the training of its pastors. It was governed by a national Synod meeting bi-annually. In 2012, it was reported that several Zambezi Evangelical Church congregations wished for greater autonomy from ZEC headquarters and unilaterally broke away when this was not conceded. The dispute went to court and in 2015 the court found in favour of ZEC, finding that the breakaway organisation had no right to any property of ZEC, nor to use the name of Zambezi Evangelical Church. The breakaway organisation's failure to comply with the court ruling later led it to be held in contempt of court.

== See also ==
- Baptist Missionary Society
- Christianity in Malawi
- Joseph Booth (missionary)
- Zambesi Mission
- British Central Africa

== Sources ==
- F D Walker, (1926) William Carey: Missionary Pioneer and Statesman, University of Michigan.
- W D Wilcox, (1913). The Need of Industrial Missions in Africa, The Biblical World, Vol. 41, No. 2.
- H W Langworthy III, (1986). Joseph Booth, Prophet of Radical Change in Central and South Africa, 1891-1915, Journal of Religion in Africa, Vol. 16, 1 *G. Shepperson and T. Price, (1958). Independent African. John Chilembwe and the Origins, Setting and Significance of the Nyasaland Native Rising of 1915. Edinburgh University Press
- K Fiedler, (1994) The Story of Faith Missions, OCMS, p. 53. ISBN 978-1-87034-518-7, enlarged 2nd edition: Klaus Fiedler, Interdenominational Faith Missions in Africa. Mzuzu: Mzuni Press, 2018.
- B Pachai, (1973). Land Policies in Malawi: An Examination of the Colonial Legacy, The Journal of African History Vol. 14. *Zambesi Mission http://www.zambesimission.org/pages/ news10-11b.html
- Zambesi Mission https://www.zambesimission.org/pages/malawi.html
- Nyasa Times http://www.nyasatimes.com/2012/09/30/malawi-council-of-churches-halt-zambezi-evangelical-break-up/
