= Kitawala =

- Region: Malawi, and Democratic Republic of Congo

Kitawala, also known as the Watchtower movement, is a Christian new religious movement that originated in Malawi in the early 20th century.

== History ==
The Kitawala or Watchtower movement emerged from varying African Christian sects, including Kimbanguism, which was influential across the African continent. As the movement spread primarily through word of mouth, carried by miners and other laborers, it reached the Congo in the 1920s. Paulo Kanumbi is widely regarded as a leading founder and pioneer of the movement in the Congo. Known for his strong spiritual inclinations and tendency toward religious inquiry, Kanumbi was introduced to Kitawala teachings through an encounter with his teacher. This experience initiated a period of spiritual exploration, after which he emerged as a prominent prophetic figure within the movement. From the 1930s onwards, the movement expanded throughout the Congo and continued to exert influence during the post-colonial period of the 1960s and beyond.

Central to the Kitawala movement was an emphasis on restorative and spiritual healing, which was presented as a means of reinforcing communal resilience and solidarity under colonial rule. However, Kitawala adherents strongly condemned the practice of witchcraft and actively sought to identify individuals accused of engaging in such practices. This opposition to witchcraft drew in part from the teachings of Tomo Nyirenda, who led large-scale witch-hunting campaigns across parts of Central Africa, influenced by Watch Tower doctrines that were also reflected in Kitawala beliefs. Similar campaigns were undertaken by Kitawala followers, resulting in the deaths of numerous Congolese individuals. These acts of violence significantly shaped colonial authorities' perceptions of the movement and its ideological character.

The goal of the Kitawalist movement was to promote spiritual, social, and political transformation that challenged colonial domination through a Christian framework. The movement sought to oppose not only institutions associated with colonial political authority but also local chieftaincies and power structures that were perceived as engaging in practices and ideologies incompatible with Kitawala beliefs. A further core principle of Kitawala articulated the liberation of Black Africans from forms of Christianity and political institutions that were centered on European authority and sustained systems of exploitation.

These ideas reflected broader Afrocentric intellectual currents, including those associated with the Negritude movement, which emphasized the cultural and political liberation of Black peoples. Simon Kimbangu, founder of the Kimbanguist Church, likewise influenced many of the ideological frameworks that shaped Kitawala beliefs.

== Spread of ideas ==
The Kitawalist movement was very effective at spreading throughout the eastern DRC, and this work was achieved by various preachers who set out to convert others as a response to a call from God. Some of these major preachers and spreaders of the movement were people, including Ilunga Jean, Ilunga Levi, and Mutombo Stephan, who sought to spread the Kitawalist message and ideas progressively and expansively. Often, they would start by having general conversations with individuals, asking for simple requests of food and water, and would engage in further conversation, beginning to share the Kitawala cause. A lot of these interactions and efforts made to convert individuals were rooted in the idea of promoting the Bible as it was supposed to be expressed, free from the white man's distortion. The preachers emphasize the idea of salvation and baptism, believing that it was through the ritual of baptism and believing in that God that people would be spiritually and physically renewed. However, some of the Kitawalist tactics were also forceful and not as cordially introduced. This method of spreading the movement proved to be very effective, inciting many individuals to get baptized throughout the region. However, its growth and expansion were feared by colonial powers, who were especially not amused with the anti-white rhetoric being pushed.

As the movement grew and gained traction, it caused tension between colonial officers, Kitawalist leaders, and chieftain powers within the provinces. The Kitawalist prophets influenced the masses, encouraging individuals to engage in varying boycotts, and many refused to do labor needed for mining. This was especially present in the Katanga region and prompted many colonial powers to crack down on the movement and try to suppress its growth. This, mixed with the witch-hunting excavations, painted a picture of violence and threat to colonial powers, prompting the colonial officers to react and to engage in plans to combat this seemingly imminent threat to power. Eventually, in the 1930s, the Belgian colonial authorities formed a secret service aimed at catching Kitawalist followers and getting them down. This was mixed with the creation of labor camps, imprisonment, and other punishments to attempt to control the movement, but these actions proved insufficient.

== Violent revolts and social consciousness ==
=== 1944 Masisi-Lubutu revolt ===
In 1944, one of the major violent Kitawala events known as the Masasi Lobut took place in a village named Magoa in the Masisi district of the Congo. The leader of the revolt, Bushiri Lugunda, had a mission to liberate the Black people from the colonial powers. He was known for spreading his teachings, known as Mapendo, which emphasized love and condemned actions deemed morally wrong, including witchcraft. Bushiri believed that he was Yesu Mukombozi, the Son of God who had come to achieve said mission. He had recruited followers and encouraged them to renounce the Belgian colonial leaders by partaking in acts of resistance like refusing to do labor, paying taxes, and boycotting. The arrest of colonial agent De Schryver, where Luganda and his followers humiliated and tortured him, sparked the revolt in which he set out to arrest the rest of the European settlers in the region and to attack the city of Bukavu. A series of violent attacks aimed at Europeans and other witchcraft users sparked a response from the colonial officers. Colonial officers created the Force Publique to suppress the revolts, and they also eventually arrested Lubutu and his followers. The event was a major effective rebellion in the Kitawalist movement and was accompanied by other small, similar engagements as well.

=== Response to colonization ===
These religious uprisings and outbursts were also deeply rooted in response to the economic and political state of the Congo as established by the Belgian colonies. Colonial rule had completely delegitimized and reconstructed pre-existing social, political, and economic structures as they once were. The colonial powers had created an atmosphere in which there was a clear distinction between the colonized and the colonizer, marked most evidently in a racial separation of the Black people and their white colonizer. This racial identity marker was deeply ingrained in the minds of the civilians. In response to that, individuals within their race created social hierarchies to try to create some superiority internally. As a result, elite Black individuals were susceptible to the control of the colonial rulers, as their upper-class status gave them a false sense of equivocal status. We see this most evidently in chieftain powers and elites, who often were used by colonial powers to try to suppress movements such as Kitawala. The chieftain elites saw the movement as a threat, as the Kitawalists did not only see the colonizers as threats but also unjust use of power and corruption, which was common in the chieftain powers. However, these alliances gave the chiefs a false sense of comfort and security, as they would inadvertently continue to be exploited by the colonizers.

== Colonial response ==
As marked by the violent uprising, the increased anti-colonial message made the colonial powers grow fearful. Consequently, in 1949, Kitawala and Watch Tower were banned completely by the colonial powers. A major fear of the colonial powers was this nationalist idea and the collective identity being pushed. They were afraid of losing their control over the people and possibly being overpowered by a strong, united front of Congolese people. This is very evident in the policies being implemented in the 1950s by the colonial officers, trying to crack down on the movement and address it fully. In trying to strategize how exactly to dismantle the movement, the colonial powers found that the issue was with the political Kitawalist, not the religious Kitawalist. The religious and spiritual ideas were tolerable for the colonists, but the anti-white, anti-colonialism rhetoric was not. The distinction between the religious and political sects of the movements was important in order to try to compromise with the movement, as it was becoming increasingly impossible to control. In doing so, there were Surete teams utilized to conduct surveillance on Kitawala and to undermine the movement. Colonial authorities also tried to forge a sense of legitimacy by introducing education, resources, and other bribes they felt would help regain trust with the constituents so they would trust the colonial powers.

However, these efforts did not prove successful, as the movement was still sustained and remained influential.

== Kitawala post-colonialism ==
Kitawala still remained relevant once Congo got its independence in 1960. Whilst the religion's major role towards resistance of an oppressive colonizer was no longer an issue, its role as a decentralized form of power was relevant. Many individuals look to Kitawala as a structure and entity providing moral grounds and frameworks for navigating the post-colonial Congo and its social, economic, and political state, which proved to be very difficult and challenging to navigate for most constituents. People especially look towards authoritative figures within the religion as trusted individuals with the wisdom and spiritual knowledge that is sought out by those who deem it necessary to live, thus exhibiting the importance of Kitawala in the Congo, both in its emergence in the 1920s and now in the present day as well.
