= October 30 =

October 30 this year in various calendars
- Friday, 30 October 2026
Akan	Kwafie
Armenian	12 Trē 1476
Aztec	Atlcahualo 8, 8 Cipactli
Babylonian	17 Tashritu, 2337 SE
Balinese pawukon	Menga, Beteng, Jaya, Keliwon, Was, Sukra of Watugunung, Kala, Tulus, Sri
Bengali	14 Kartik, BS 1433
Chinese	Yin Fire Ox・Bond Mansion; Fire Horse Year, Month 9, Day 21 (Shuangjiang, 8 days until Lidong)
Common Era	30 October 2026 CE
Coptic	20 Paopi, AM 1743
Egyptian	17 Phamenoth, 2775 NE
Ethiopian	20 Ṭeqemt, 2019 Amätä Məhrät
French Republican	Décade I, Octidi de Brumaire de l'Année 235 de la République
Gregorian	30 October, AD 2026
Hebrew	19 Cheshvan, AM 5787
Hindu	Mṛgaśiras・Parigha; Solar: 13 Kārtika, 1948 SE; Lunisolar: Pañcamī, Kṛishna pakṣa of Āśvina, 2083 VE; Rāudra・5127 KY・1,872,878
Icelandic	Föstudagur, 7 Gormánuður 2026
Islamic	18 Jumada al-awwal, AH 1448 (using tabular method)
ISO week date	2026-W44-5
Japanese	20 Nagatsuki, Reiwa 8 (Sōkō, 8 days until Rittō)
Julian	17 October, AD 2026 (AM 7535)
Julian day	2461344
Korean	20 Gaedal, 4359 DE
Maya	13.0.14.1.1; 14 Zac, 8 Imix
Roman	ante diem XVI Kalendas Novembres, MMDCCLXXIX AUC
Solar Hijri	8 Aban, SH 1405
Tibetan	20 tha skar, me pho rta 2153 or 1772 or 1000

<<	October					>>
Su	Mo	Tu	We	Th	Fr	Sa
				1	2	3
4	5	6	7	8	9	10
11	12	13	14	15	16	17
18	19	20	21	22	23	24
25	26	27	28	29	30	31
2026

October 30 in recent years
2026 (Friday)
2025 (Thursday)
2024 (Wednesday)
2023 (Monday)
2022 (Sunday)
2021 (Saturday)
2020 (Friday)
2019 (Wednesday)
2018 (Tuesday)
2017 (Monday)

October 30 is the 303rd day of the year (304th in leap years) in the Gregorian calendar; 62 days remain until the end of the year.

== Events ==
=== Pre-1600 ===
- 130 – Emperor Hadrian establishes the city of Antinoöpolis on the Nile in honour of his companion Antinous, creating a new Hellenizing foundation in Roman Egypt.
- 637 – Arab–Byzantine wars: Antioch surrenders to the Rashidun Caliphate after the Battle of the Iron Bridge.
- 701 – Election of Pope John VI following the death of Pope Sergius I in the previous month.
- 758 – Guangzhou is sacked by Arab and Persian pirates.
- 942 – Election of Pope Marinus II following the death of Pope Stephen VIII in the same month.
- 1137 – Ranulf of Apulia defeats Roger II of Sicily at the Battle of Rignano, securing his position as duke until his death two years later.
- 1270 – The Eighth Crusade ends by an agreement between Charles I of Anjou (replacing his deceased brother King Louis IX of France) and the Hafsid dynasty of Tunis, Tunisia.
- 1340 – Reconquista: Portuguese and Castilian forces halt a Muslim invasion at the Battle of Río Salado.

=== 1601–1900 ===
- 1657 – Anglo-Spanish War: Spanish forces fail to retake Jamaica at the Battle of Ocho Rios.
- 1697 – France and the Holy Roman Empire sign a peace treaty at Ryswick, the last of a series of treaties which ends the Nine Years' War.
- 1806 – War of the Fourth Coalition: Convinced that he is facing a much larger force, Prussian General von Romberg, commanding 5,300 men, surrenders the city of Stettin to 800 French soldiers.
- 1817 – Simón Bolívar becomes President of the Third Republic of Venezuela.
- 1831 – Nat Turner is arrested for leading the bloodiest slave rebellion in United States history.
- 1836 – Louis Napoleon launches the unsuccessful Strasbourg Coup to overthrow the July Monarchy in France
- 1858 – Approximately 20 people die in Bradford, England, UK, after being poisoned from ingesting sweets that had been accidentally adulterated with arsenic trioxide.
- 1863 – Danish Prince Vilhelm arrives in Athens to assume his throne as George I, King of the Hellenes.
- 1864 – Second War of Schleswig: The Treaty of Vienna is signed, by which Denmark relinquishes one province each to Prussia and Austria.
- 1888 – The Rudd Concession is granted by Matabeleland to agents of Cecil Rhodes.

=== 1901–present ===
- 1905 – Tsar Nicholas II issues the October Manifesto, nominally granting the Russian peoples basic civil liberties and the right to form a duma. (October 17 in the Julian calendar)
- 1918 – World War I: The Ottoman Empire signs the Armistice of Mudros with the Allies.
- 1918 – World War I: Lands of the Crown of Saint Stephen, a state union of Kingdom of Hungary and Triune Kingdom of Croatia, Slavonia and Dalmatia is abolished with decisions of Croatian and Hungarian parliaments.
- 1920 – The Communist Party of Australia is founded in Sydney.
- 1938 – Orson Welles broadcasts a radio adaptation of H. G. Wells's The War of the Worlds, causing a massive panic in some of the audience in the United States.
- 1941 – President Roosevelt approves $1 billion in Lend-Lease aid to the Allied nations.
- 1941 – Holocaust: Fifteen hundred Jews from Pidhaytsi are sent by Nazis to Bełżec extermination camp.
- 1942 – World War II: Lt. Tony Fasson and Able Seaman Colin Grazier drown while taking code books from the sinking German submarine U-559.
- 1944 – Holocaust: Anne and Margot Frank are deported from Auschwitz to the Bergen-Belsen concentration camp, where they die from disease the following year, shortly before the end of WWII.
- 1947 – The General Agreement on Tariffs and Trade (GATT), the foundation of the World Trade Organization (WTO), is founded.
- 1948 – A luzzu fishing boat overloaded with passengers capsizes and sinks in the Gozo Channel off Qala, Gozo, Malta, killing 23 of the 27 people on board.
- 1953 – President Eisenhower approves the top-secret document NSC 162/2 concerning the maintenance of a strong nuclear deterrent force against the Soviet Union.
- 1956 – Hungarian Revolution: The government of Imre Nagy recognizes newly established revolutionary workers' councils. Army officer Béla Király leads anti-Soviet militias in an attack on the headquarters of the Hungarian Working People's Party.
- 1959 – Piedmont Airlines Flight 349 crashes on approach to Charlottesville–Albemarle Airport in Albemarle County, Virginia, killing 26 of the 27 on board.
- 1961 – The Soviet Union detonates the Tsar Bomba, the most powerful explosive device ever detonated.
- 1968 – A squad of 120 North Korean Army commandos land in boats along a 25-mile long section of the eastern coast of South Korea in a failed attempt to overthrow the dictatorship of Park Chung Hee and bring about the reunification of Korea.
- 1973 – The Bosphorus Bridge in Turkey is completed, connecting the continents of Europe and Asia over the Bosphorus for the second time.
- 1975 – Prince Juan Carlos I of Spain becomes acting head of state, taking over for the country's ailing dictator, Gen. Francisco Franco.
- 1975 – Forty-five people are killed when Inex-Adria Aviopromet Flight 450 crashes into Suchdol, Prague, while on approach to Prague Ruzyně Airport (now Václav Havel Airport Prague) in Czechoslovakia (present-day Czech Republic).
- 1980 – El Salvador and Honduras agree to put the border dispute fought over in 1969's Football War before the International Court of Justice.
- 1983 – The first democratic elections in Argentina, after seven years of military rule, are held.
- 1983 – A magnitude 6.6 earthquake in the Turkish provinces of Erzurum and Kars leaves approximately 1,340 people dead.
- 1985 – Space Shuttle Challenger lifts off for mission STS-61-A, its final successful mission.
- 1991 – The Israeli-Palestinian conflict: The Madrid Conference commences in an effort to revive peace negotiations between Israel and Palestine.
- 1995 – Quebec citizens narrowly vote (50.58% to 49.42%) in favour of remaining a province of Canada in their second referendum on national sovereignty.
- 2005 – The rebuilt Dresden Frauenkirche (destroyed in the firebombing of Dresden during World War II) is reconsecrated after a thirteen-year rebuilding project.
- 2013 – Forty-five people are killed and seven injured after a bus catches fire in Mahabubnagar district, Andhra Pradesh (present-day Telangana), India.
- 2014 – Sweden becomes the first European Union member state to officially recognize Palestine as an independent and sovereign state.
- 2014 – Four people are killed when a Beechcraft Super King Air crashes at Wichita Dwight D. Eisenhower National Airport in Wichita, Kansas.
- 2015 – A fire in a nightclub in the Romanian capital of Bucharest kills sixty-four people and leaves more than 147 injured.
- 2020 – A magnitude 7.0 earthquake strikes the Aegean Sea between Greece and Turkey, triggering a tsunami. At least 119 people die mainly due to collapsed buildings.
- 2022 – A pedestrian suspension bridge collapses in the city of Morbi, Gujarat, leading to the deaths of at least 135 people.
- 2023 – First rescue of a prisoner during the Israeli invasion of Gaza.

== Births ==
=== Pre-1600 ===
- 39 BC – Julia the Elder, Roman daughter of Augustus (died 14 AD)
- 1218 – Emperor Chūkyō of Japan (died 1234)
- 1327 – Andrew, Duke of Calabria (died 1345)
- 1447 – Lucas Watzenrode, Prince-Bishop of Warmia (died 1512)
- 1492 – Anne d'Alençon, French noblewoman (died 1562)
- 1513 – Jacques Amyot, French bishop and translator (died 1593)
- 1558 – Jacques-Nompar de Caumont, duc de La Force, Marshal of France (died 1652)

=== 1601–1900 ===
- 1624 – Paul Pellisson, French historian and author (died 1693)
- 1632 – Christopher Wren, English physicist, mathematician, and architect, designed St Paul's Cathedral (died 1723)
- 1660 – Ernest August, Duke of Schleswig-Holstein-Sonderburg-Augustenburg (died 1731)
- 1668 – Sophia Charlotte of Hanover (died 1705)
- 1712 – Giovanni Pietro Francesco Agius de Soldanis, Maltese linguist, historian and cleric (died 1770)
- 1728 – Mary Hayley, English businesswoman (died 1808)
- 1735 – John Adams, American lawyer and politician, 2nd President of the United States (died 1826)
- 1741 – Angelica Kauffman, painter (died 1807)
- 1751 – Richard Brinsley Sheridan, Irish-English poet, playwright, and politician, Treasurer of the Navy (died 1816)
- 1762 – André Chénier, Turkish-French poet and playwright (died 1794)
- 1786 – Philippe-Joseph Aubert de Gaspé, Canadian captain and author (died 1871)
- 1799 – Ignace Bourget, Canadian bishop (died 1885)
- 1839 – Alfred Sisley, French-English painter (died 1899)
- 1857 – Georges Gilles de la Tourette, French-Swiss physician and neurologist (died 1904)
- 1861 – Antoine Bourdelle, French sculptor and painter (died 1929)
- 1868 – António Cabreira, Portuguese polygraph (died 1953)
- 1871 – Buck Freeman, American baseball player (died 1949)
- 1871 – Paul Valéry, French poet and philosopher (died 1945)
- 1873 – Francisco I. Madero, Mexican businessman and politician, 33rd President of Mexico (died 1913)
- 1877 – Hugo Celmiņš, Latvian politician, Prime Minister of Latvia (died 1941)
- 1878 – Arthur Scherbius, German electrical engineer, invented the Enigma machine (died 1929)
- 1881 – Elizabeth Madox Roberts, American poet and author (died 1941)
- 1882 – Oldřich Duras, Czech chess player and composer (died 1957)
- 1882 – William Halsey Jr., American admiral (died 1959)
- 1882 – Günther von Kluge, Polish-German field marshal (died 1944)
- 1885 – Ezra Pound, American poet and critic (died 1972)
- 1886 – Zoë Akins, American author, poet, and playwright (died 1958)
- 1887 – Sukumar Ray, Indian-Bangladeshi author, poet, and playwright (died 1923)
- 1888 – Louis Menges, American soccer player, soldier, and politician (died 1969)
- 1888 – Konstantinos Tsiklitiras, Greek footballer and high jumper (died 1913)
- 1892 – Charles Atlas, Italian-American bodybuilder (died 1972)
- 1893 – Roland Freisler, German soldier, lawyer, and judge (died 1945)
- 1894 – Jean Rostand, French biologist and philosopher (died 1977)
- 1894 – Peter Warlock, English composer and critic (died 1930)
- 1895 – Gerhard Domagk, German pathologist and bacteriologist, Nobel Prize laureate (died 1964)
- 1895 – Dickinson W. Richards, American physician and physiologist, Nobel Prize laureate (died 1973)
- 1896 – Rex Cherryman, American actor (died 1928)
- 1896 – Ruth Gordon, American actress and screenwriter (died 1985)
- 1896 – Kostas Karyotakis, Greek poet and educator (died 1928)
- 1896 – Harry R. Truman, American soldier and inn keeper on Mount St. Helens, killed in the eruption (died 1980)
- 1896 – Antonino Votto, Italian conductor (died 1985)
- 1897 – Agustín Lara, Mexican singer-songwriter and actor (died 1970)
- 1898 – Bill Terry, American baseball player and manager (died 1989)
- 1900 – Ragnar Granit, Finnish-Swedish physiologist and academic, Nobel Prize laureate (died 1991)

=== 1901–present ===
- 1905 – Johnny Miles, English-Canadian runner (died 2003)
- 1906 – Giuseppe Farina, Italian race car driver (died 1966)
- 1906 – Hermann Fegelein, German general (died 1945)
- 1906 – Alexander Gode, German-American linguist and translator (died 1970)
- 1907 – Sol Tax, American anthropologist and academic (died 1995)
- 1908 – Patsy Montana, American singer-songwriter and actress (died 1996)
- 1908 – U. Muthuramalingam Thevar, Indian politician (died 1963)
- 1908 – Peter Smith, English cricketer (died 1967)
- 1908 – Dmitry Ustinov, Marshal of the Soviet Union (died 1984)
- 1909 – Homi J. Bhabha, Indian-French physicist and academic (died 1966)
- 1910 – Miguel Hernández, Spanish poet and playwright (died 1942)
- 1910 – Luciano Sgrizzi, Italian-Monegasque organist and composer (died 1994)
- 1911 – Ruth Hussey, American actress (died 2005)
- 1914 – Richard E. Holz, American minister and composer (died 1986)
- 1914 – Leabua Jonathan, Basotho lawyer and politician, 2nd Prime Minister of Lesotho (died 1987)
- 1914 – Anna Wing, English actress (died 2013)
- 1915 – Fred W. Friendly, American journalist and producer (died 1998)
- 1915 – Jane Randolph, American-Swiss actress and singer (died 2009)
- 1916 – Leon Day, American baseball player (died 1995)
- 1917 – Bobby Bragan, American baseball player, coach, and manager (died 2010)
- 1917 – Minni Nurme, Estonian writer and poet (died 1994)
- 1917 – Nikolai Ogarkov, Russian field marshal (died 1994)
- 1917 – Maurice Trintignant, French race car driver (died 2005)
- 1920 – Christy Ring, Irish sportsman (died 1979)
- 1921 – Valli Lember-Bogatkina (died 2016)
- 1922 – Elena Mikhnenko, Ukrainian exile (died 1993)
- 1922 – Iancu Țucărman, Romanian Holocaust survivor (died 2021)
- 1922 – Jane White, American actress and singer (died 2011)
- 1923 – Gloria Oden, American poet and academic (died 2011)
- 1924 – John P. Craven, American soldier and engineer (died 2015)
- 1925 – Tommy Ridgley, American singer and bandleader (died 1999)
- 1926 – Jacques Swaters, Belgian race car driver and manager (died 2010)
- 1927 – Joe Adcock, American baseball player and manager (died 1999)
- 1928 – Daniel Nathans, American microbiologist and academic, Nobel Prize laureate (died 1999)
- 1929 – Jean Chapman, English author (died 2026)
- 1929 – Olga Zubarry, Argentinian actress (died 2012)
- 1930 – Néstor Almendros, Spanish-American director and cinematographer (died 1992)
- 1930 – Christopher Foster, English economist and academic (died 2022)
- 1930 – Clifford Brown, American trumpet player and composer (died 1956)
- 1930 – Don Meineke, American basketball player (died 2013)
- 1931 – Vince Callahan, American lieutenant and politician (died 2014)
- 1931 – David M. Wilson, Manx archaeologist, historian, and curator
- 1932 – Barun De, Indian historian and author (died 2013)
- 1932 – Louis Malle, French director, producer, and screenwriter (died 1995)
- 1933 – Col Campbell, New Zealand gardener and television host (died 2012)
- 1934 – Keith Barnes, Welsh-Australian rugby player and coach (died 2024)
- 1934 – Frans Brüggen, Dutch flute player and conductor (died 2014)
- 1935 – Robert Caro, American journalist and author
- 1935 – Ágota Kristóf, Hungarian-Swiss author (died 2011)
- 1935 – Jim Perry, American baseball player
- 1935 – Michael Winner, English director, producer, and screenwriter (died 2013)
- 1936 – Polina Astakhova, Ukrainian gymnast and trainer (died 2005)
- 1936 – Dick Vermeil, American football player and coach
- 1937 – Claude Lelouch, French actor, director, producer, and screenwriter
- 1937 – Brian Price, Welsh rugby player (died 2023)
- 1938 – Morris Lurie, Australian novelist, short story writer, and playwright (died 2014)
- 1939 – Harvey Goldstein, English statistician and academic (died 2020)
- 1939 – Leland H. Hartwell, American biologist and academic, Nobel Prize laureate
- 1939 – Eddie Holland, American singer-songwriter and producer
- 1939 – Grace Slick, American singer-songwriter and model
- 1941 – Marcel Berlins, French-English lawyer, journalist, and academic (died 2019)
- 1941 – Aleksandr Dulichenko, Russian-Estonian linguist and academic
- 1941 – Theodor W. Hänsch, German physicist and academic, Nobel Prize laureate
- 1941 – Otis Williams, American singer-songwriter and producer
- 1941 – Bob Wilson, English footballer and sportscaster
- 1942 – Sven-David Sandström, Swedish composer and historian (died 2019)
- 1943 – Paul Claes, Belgian poet and translator
- 1943 – Joanna Shimkus, Canadian actress
- 1943 – David Triesman, Baron Triesman, English union leader and politician
- 1944 – Ahmed Chalabi, Iraqi businessman and politician (died 2015)
- 1945 – Henry Winkler, American actor, comedian, director, and producer
- 1945 – Lynne Marta, American actress (died 2024)
- 1946 – Robert L. Gibson, American captain, pilot, and astronaut
- 1946 – Andrea Mitchell, American journalist
- 1946 – Anthony Shorrocks, English economist, author, and academic
- 1946 – Chris Slade, Welsh drummer
- 1947 – Glenn Andreotta, American soldier (died 1968)
- 1947 – Tim Kirk, American illustrator and designer
- 1947 – Timothy B. Schmit, American singer-songwriter and bass player
- 1947 – Herschel Weingrod, American screenwriter and producer
- 1948 – Richard Alston, English dancer and choreographer
- 1948 – Garry McDonald, Australian actor and screenwriter
- 1949 – Larry Gene Bell, American murderer (died 1996)
- 1949 – Leon Rippy, American actor
- 1950 – Phil Chenier, American basketball player and broadcaster
- 1950 – Tim Sheens, Australian rugby league player and coach
- 1951 – Tony Bettenhausen Jr., American race car driver and businessman (died 2000)
- 1951 – Trilok Gurtu, Indian drummer and songwriter
- 1951 – Harry Hamlin, American actor
- 1951 – Poncho Sanchez, American singer and conga player
- 1953 – Pete Hoekstra, Dutch-American lawyer and politician
- 1953 – Charles Martin Smith, American actor, director, and screenwriter
- 1954 – Mahmoud El Khatib, Egyptian footballer
- 1954 – T. Graham Brown, American country singer-songwriter
- 1954 – Jeannie Kendall, American country singer-songwriter
- 1954 – Mario Testino, Peruvian-English photographer
- 1955 – Heidi Heitkamp, American lawyer and politician, 28th Attorney General of North Dakota
- 1956 – Juliet Stevenson, English actress
- 1957 – Shlomo Mintz, Israeli violinist and conductor
- 1957 – Kevin Pollak, American actor, game show host, and producer
- 1958 – Olav Dale, Norwegian saxophonist and composer (died 2014)
- 1958 – Joe Delaney, American football player (died 1983)
- 1958 – Ramona d'Viola, American cyclist and photographer
- 1958 – Pétur Guðmundsson, Icelandic basketball player and coach
- 1959 – Vincent Lagaf', French actor, singer, and game show host
- 1960 – Charnele Brown, American actress and singer
- 1960 – Grayson Hugh, American singer-songwriter
- 1960 – Diego Maradona, Argentinian footballer, coach, and manager (died 2020)
- 1961 – Scott Garrelts, American baseball player
- 1961 – Giorgos Papakonstantinou, Greek economist and politician, Greek Minister of Finance
- 1961 – Larry Wilmore, American comedian and television host
- 1962 – Stefan Kuntz, German footballer and manager
- 1962 – Danny Tartabull, Puerto Rican baseball player
- 1962 – Courtney Walsh, Jamaican cricketer
- 1963 – Michael Beach, American actor and producer
- 1963 – Rebecca Heineman, American video game designer and programmer (died 2025)
- 1963 – Andrew Solomon, American-English journalist and author
- 1963 – Mike Veletta, Australian cricketer and coach
- 1963 – Kristina Wagner, American actress
- 1964 – Adnan Al Talyani, Emirati footballer
- 1964 – Humayun Kabir Dhali, Bangladeshi journalist and author
- 1964 – Howard Lederer, American poker player
- 1965 – Gavin Rossdale, English singer-songwriter, guitarist, and actor
- 1967 – Brad Aitken, Canadian ice hockey player
- 1967 – Leonidas Kavakos, Greek violinist and conductor
- 1968 – Emmanuelle Claret, French biathlete (died 2013)
- 1968 – Jack Plotnick, American actor, director, and producer
- 1968 – Ken Stringfellow, American singer-songwriter and guitarist
- 1969 – Stanislav Gross, Czech lawyer and politician, 5th Prime Minister of the Czech Republic (died 2015)
- 1969 – Snow, Canadian rapper and reggae singer-songwriter
- 1969 – Vangelis Vourtzoumis, Greek basketball player
- 1970 – Ben Bailey, American comedian and game show host
- 1970 – Tory Belleci, American visual effects designer and television presenter
- 1970 – Christine Bersola-Babao, Filipino journalist and actress
- 1970 – Billy Brown, American actor
- 1970 – Nia Long, American actress
- 1970 – Ekaterini Voggoli, Greek discus thrower
- 1971 – Fredi Bobic, Slovenian-German footballer and manager
- 1971 – Tzanis Stavrakopoulos, Greek basketball player
- 1971 – Suzan van der Wielen, Dutch field hockey player
- 1972 – Jessica Hynes, English actress, producer, and screenwriter
- 1973 – Michael Buettner, Australian rugby league player and official
- 1973 – Silvia Corzo, Colombian lawyer and journalist
- 1973 – Edge, Canadian wrestler and actor
- 1973 – Michael Oakes, English footballer and manager
- 1973 – Raci Şaşmaz, Turkish actor, producer, and screenwriter
- 1975 – Ian D'Sa, English-Canadian singer-songwriter, guitarist, and producer
- 1975 – Marco Scutaro, Venezuelan baseball player
- 1976 – Stern John, Trinidadian footballer
- 1976 – Ümit Özat, Turkish footballer and manager
- 1976 – Maurice Taylor, American basketball player
- 1978 – Martin Dossett, American football player
- 1978 – Stephanie Izard, American chef
- 1978 – Matthew Morrison, American singer-songwriter and actor
- 1978 – Dan Poulter, English physician and politician
- 1978 – Derren Witcombe, New Zealand rugby player and cricketer
- 1980 – Rich Alvarez, Filipino-Japanese basketball player
- 1980 – Choi Hong-man, South Korean wrestler and mixed martial artist
- 1980 – Kareem Rush, American basketball player
- 1981 – Fiona Dourif, American actress
- 1981 – Jun Ji-hyun, South Korean model and actress
- 1981 – Ayaka Kimura, Japanese singer and actress
- 1981 – Shaun Sipos, Canadian actor
- 1981 – Ivanka Trump, American model and businesswoman
- 1982 – Clémence Poésy, French actress and model
- 1983 – Iain Hume, Canadian soccer player
- 1983 – Maor Melikson, Israeli footballer
- 1983 – Nicole Williams English, Canadian fashion designer and model
- 1984 – Gedo, Egyptian footballer
- 1984 – Eva Marcille, American model and actress
- 1985 – Ragnar Klavan, Estonian footballer
- 1986 – Desmond Jennings, American baseball player
- 1986 – Thomas Morgenstern, Austrian ski jumper
- 1986 – Keisuke Sohma, Japanese actor
- 1986 – Tamera Young, American basketball player
- 1987 – Danielle Fong, Canadian entrepreneur, co-founder and chief scientist of LightSail Energy
- 1987 – Ashley Graham, American model
- 1987 – Ali Riley, New Zealand footballer
- 1988 – Janel Parrish, American actress and singer
- 1989 – Ashley Barnes, Austrian-English footballer
- 1989 – Nastia Liukin, Russian-American gymnast and actress
- 1989 – Vanessa White, English singer, former member of The Saturdays
- 1990 – Joe Panik, American baseball player
- 1990 – Suwaibou Sanneh, Gambian sprinter
- 1991 – Jarell Eddie, American basketball player
- 1991 – Artemi Panarin, Russian ice hockey player
- 1991 – Tomáš Satoranský, Czech basketball player
- 1992 – Matt Parcell, Australian rugby league player
- 1992 – Camila Silva, Chilean tennis player
- 1993 – Marcus Mariota, American football player
- 1994 – Mia Eklund, Finnish tennis player
- 1996 – Devin Booker, American basketball player
- 1996 – Dennis Gilbert, American ice hockey player
- 1996 – Kennedy McMann, American actress
- 1996 – Kim Ji-sung, South Korean actress
- 1997 – Tage Thompson, American ice hockey player
- 1998 – Cale Makar, Canadian ice hockey player
- 2000 – Giselle, Japanese singer

== Deaths ==
=== Pre-1600 ===
- 526 – Paul of Edessa, Syriac Orthodox bishop of Edessa
- 1137 – Sergius VII, Duke of Naples
- 1282 – Ibn Khallikan, Iraqi scholar and judge (born 1211)
- 1459 – Poggio Bracciolini, Italian scholar and translator (born 1380)
- 1466 – Johann Fust, German printer (born c. 1400)
- 1522 – Jean Mouton, French composer and educator (born 1459)
- 1553 – Jacob Sturm von Sturmeck, German politician (born 1489)

=== 1601–1900 ===
- 1602 – Jean-Jacques Boissard, French poet and illustrator (born 1528)
- 1611 – Charles IX of Sweden (born 1550)
- 1626 – Willebrord Snell, Dutch astronomer and mathematician (born 1580)
- 1632 – Henri II de Montmorency, French admiral and politician (born 1595)
- 1654 – Emperor Go-Kōmyō of Japan (born 1633)
- 1680 – Antoinette Bourignon, French-Flemish mystic (born 1616)
- 1685 – Michel Le Tellier, French lawyer and politician, French Secretary of State for War (born 1603)
- 1690 – Hieronymus van Beverningh, Dutch diplomat and politician (born 1614)
- 1730 – Nedîm, Turkish poet (born 1681)
- 1757 – Osman III, Ottoman sultan (born 1699)
- 1757 – Edward Vernon, English admiral and politician (born 1684)
- 1809 – William Cavendish-Bentinck, 3rd Duke of Portland, English politician, Prime Minister of the United Kingdom (born 1738)
- 1816 – Frederick I of Württemberg (born 1754)
- 1842 – Allan Cunningham, Scottish author and poet (born 1784)
- 1853 – Pietro Raimondi, Italian composer (born 1786)
- 1882 – William Forster, Indian-Australian politician, 4th Premier of New South Wales (born 1818)
- 1883 – Dayananda Saraswati, Indian philosopher and scholar (born 1824)
- 1883 – Robert Volkmann, German pianist and composer (born 1815)
- 1893 – John Abbott, Canadian lawyer and politician, 3rd Prime Minister of Canada (born 1821)
- 1894 – Honoré Mercier, Canadian lawyer and politician, 9th Premier of Quebec (born 1840)
- 1895 – James Patterson, English-Australian politician, 17th Premier of Victoria (born 1833)
- 1896 – Carol Benesch, Czech architect, designed Peleș Castle (born 1822)
- 1899 – William H. Webb, American shipbuilder and philanthropist (born 1816)

=== 1901–present ===
- 1905 – Boyd Dunlop Morehead, Australian politician, 10th Premier of Queensland (born 1843)
- 1910 – Henry Dunant, Swiss activist, founded the Red Cross, Nobel Prize laureate (born 1828)
- 1912 – Alejandro Gorostiaga, Chilean colonel (born 1840)
- 1912 – James S. Sherman, American lawyer and politician, 27th Vice President of the United States (born 1855)
- 1915 – Charles Tupper, Canadian physician, lawyer, and politician, 6th Prime Minister of Canada (born 1821)
- 1919 – Ella Wheeler Wilcox, American author and poet (born 1850)
- 1923 – Bonar Law, Canadian-English banker and politician, Prime Minister of the United Kingdom (born 1858)
- 1929 – Norman Pritchard, Indian-English hurdler and actor (born 1877)
- 1933 – Svend Kornbeck, Danish actor (born 1869)
- 1942 – Walter Buckmaster, English polo player and stockbroker, co-founder of Buckmaster & Moore (born 1872)
- 1943 – Max Reinhardt, Austrian-born American actor and director (born 1873)
- 1957 – Fred Beebe, American baseball player and coach (born 1880)
- 1961 – Luigi Einaudi, Italian economist and politician, 2nd President of the Italian Republic (born 1874)
- 1963 – U. Muthuramalingam Thevar, Indian lawyer and politician (born 1908)
- 1965 – Arthur M. Schlesinger, Sr., American historian and author (born 1888)
- 1966 – Yiorgos Theotokas, Greek author and playwright (born 1906)
- 1968 – Ramon Novarro, Mexican-American actor, singer, and director (born 1899)
- 1968 – Conrad Richter, American journalist and novelist (born 1890)
- 1968 – Rose Wilder Lane, American journalist and author (born 1886)
- 1973 – Ants Lauter, Estonian actor and director (born 1894)
- 1975 – Gustav Ludwig Hertz, German physicist and academic, Nobel Prize laureate (born 1887)
- 1979 – Barnes Wallis, English scientist and engineer, inventor of the "bouncing bomb" (born 1887)
- 1982 – Iryna Vilde, Ukrainian author and educator (born 1907)
- 1987 – Joseph Campbell, American mythologist, scholar, and author (born 1904)
- 1988 – Florence Nagle, English trainer and breeder of racehorses (born 1894)
- 1990 – V. Shantaram, Indian actor, director, and producer (born 1901)
- 1992 – Joan Mitchell, American painter (born 1925)
- 1993 – Paul Grégoire, Canadian cardinal (born 1911)
- 1993 – Peter Kemp, English soldier, mercenary, and writer (born 1915)
- 1997 – Samuel Fuller, American actor, director, producer, and screenwriter (born 1912)
- 1999 – Maigonis Valdmanis, Latvian basketball player (born 1933)
- 2000 – Steve Allen, American actor, television personality, game show panelist, and talk show host (born 1921)
- 2002 – Juan Antonio Bardem, Spanish actor, director, and screenwriter (born 1922)
- 2002 – Jam Master Jay, American rapper and producer (born 1965)
- 2004 – Phyllis Frost, Australian philanthropist, founded Keep Australia Beautiful (born 1917)
- 2004 – Peggy Ryan, American actress and dancer (born 1924)
- 2005 – Al López, American baseball player and manager (born 1908)
- 2005 – Shamsher Singh Sheri, Indian politician (born 1942)
- 2006 – Clifford Geertz, American anthropologist and author (born 1926)
- 2006 – Junji Kinoshita, Japanese playwright and scholar (born 1914)
- 2007 – Robert Goulet, American actor and singer (born 1933)
- 2007 – Linda S. Stein, American businesswoman and manager (born 1945)
- 2007 – John Woodruff, American runner and colonel (born 1915)
- 2008 – Pedro Pompilio, Argentinian businessman (born 1950)
- 2009 – Claude Lévi-Strauss, French anthropologist and ethnologist (born 1908)
- 2010 – Harry Mulisch, Dutch author, poet, and playwright (born 1927)
- 2012 – Franck Biancheri, French politician (born 1961)
- 2012 – Samina Raja, Pakistani poet and educator (born 1961)
- 2013 – Bill Currie, American baseball player (born 1928)
- 2014 – Elijah Malok Aleng, Sudanese general and politician (born 1937)
- 2014 – Renée Asherson, English actress (born 1915)
- 2014 – Ida Elizabeth Osbourne, Australian actress and radio host (born 1916)
- 2015 – Mel Daniels, American basketball player and coach (born 1944)
- 2015 – Al Molinaro, American actor (born 1919)
- 2015 – Sinan Şamil Sam, Turkish boxer (born 1974)
- 2017 – Kim Joo-hyuk, South Korean actor (born 1972)
- 2024 – Matt Peacock, Australian journalist and author (born 1952)

== Holidays and observances ==
- Anniversary of the Declaration of the Slovak Nation (Slovakia)
- Christian feast day:
  - Ethelnoth (Egelnoth) the Good
  - Blessed Benvenuta Bojani
  - Blessed Dominic Collins (Catholic, Ireland, Society of Jesus)
  - Gerard of Potenza
  - Blessed Maria Teresa of St. Joseph
  - John Wycliffe (Episcopal Church (USA))
  - Marcellus of Tangier
  - Blessed Oleksiy Zaryckyy
  - Saturninus of Cagliari
  - Serapion of Antioch
  - Talarican (Tarkin)
  - Blessed Terence O'Brien
  - Zenobios and Zenobia
  - October 30 (Eastern Orthodox liturgics)
- Day of Remembrance of the Victims of Political Repressions (former Soviet republics, except Ukraine)
- Thevar Jayanthi (Thevar community, India)
- Mischief Night (Ireland, Canada, United Kingdom, United States and other places)
