= Battle of Guadalmesí =

1342 naval battle in the Reconquista

- Part of Reconquista
Date	April 8th, 1342
Location	Guadalmesí, Strait of Gibraltar
Result	Castilian–Portuguese victory

Belligerents
Crown of Castile; Kingdom of Portugal	Marinid Sultanate

Commanders and leaders
Alfonso XI of Castile	Abu al-Hasan Ali

Strength
Unknown	Unknown

Casualties and losses
Unknown	Heavy

The Battle of Guadalmesí (1342) was a naval battle between the Kingdom of Castile, with the support of the Kingdom of Portugal, against the Marinid Sultanate.

== Background ==
After the Battle of Getares on April 8th, 1340, where the Castilian fleet suffered a setback, the Christian forces, supported by the Kingdom of Portugal and the Republic of Genoa, rearmed and prepared for a decisive engagement. The Castilian and Portuguese fleets sought to regain control of the Strait and support the ongoing siege of Algeciras.

== The Battle ==
On April 8th, 1342, the combined Castilian and Portuguese fleet confronted the Marinid forces in Guadalmesí. The Christian forces, having received reinforcements and naval support, achieved a decisive victory over the Marinid fleet.

== Aftermath ==
The victory at Guadalmesí allowed Alfonso XI of Castile to proceed with the siege of Algeciras, which eventually led to the city's capture.

== See also ==
- Reconquista
- Battle of Río Salado
- Siege of Algeciras (1342–1344)
