= Dalhousie University Faculty of Computer Science =

Facility in Halifax, Canada

Coordinates: 44°38′17″N 63°35′13″W

Faculty of Computer Science, Dalhousie University
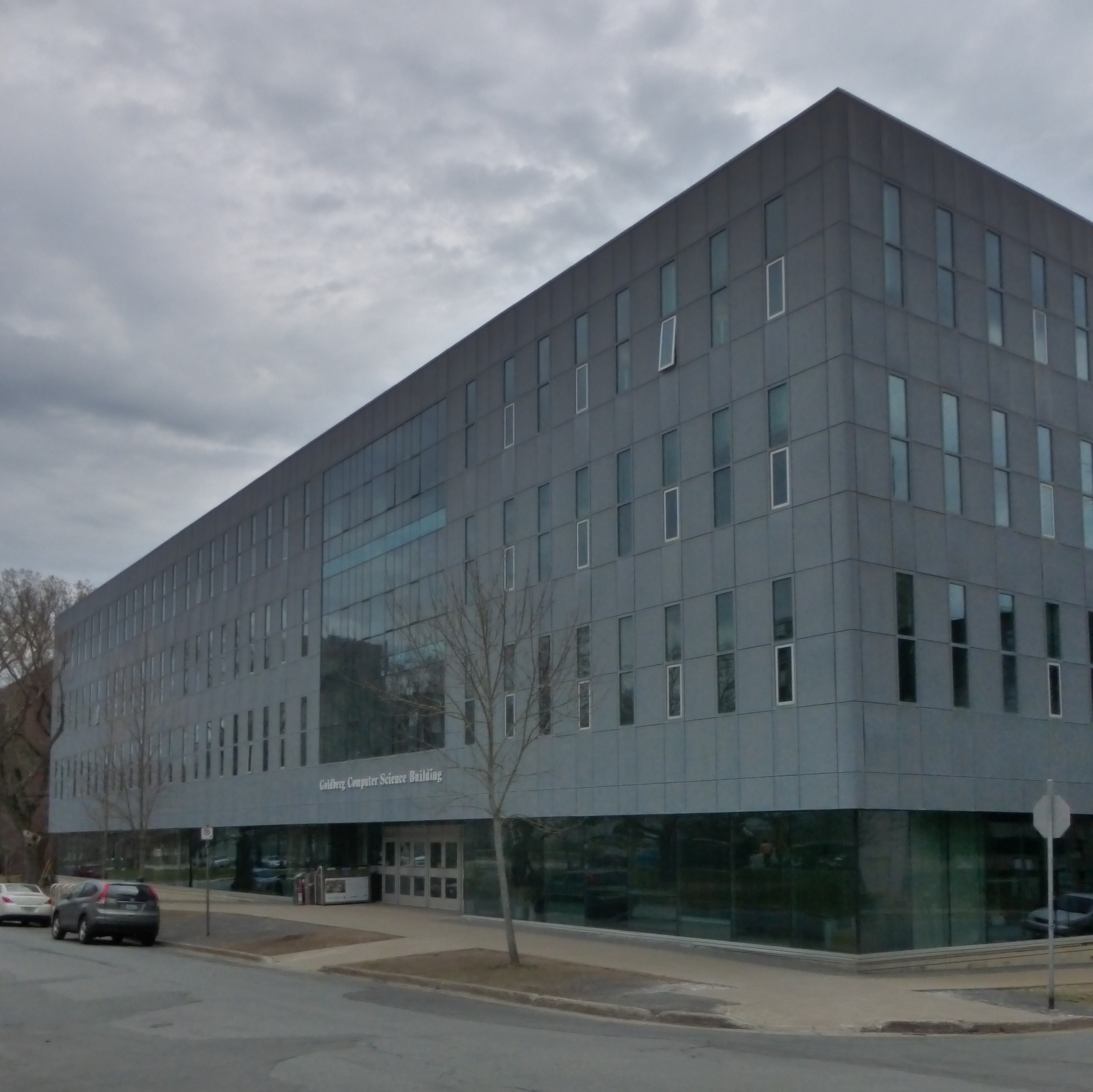
- Former names: School of Computer Science, Technical University of Nova Scotia (? - 1997); Computer Science Division, Department of Mathematics, Statistics & Computer Science, Dalhousie University (? - 1997)
- Type: Faculty
- Established: 1997
- Affiliations: Dalhousie University
- Faculty: 78
- Undergraduates: < 550
- Postgraduates: < 250
- Location: Halifax, Nova Scotia, Canada
- Website: Dalhousie Computer Science Website

The Faculty of Computer Science is a faculty of Dalhousie University in Halifax, Nova Scotia, Canada.

== History ==
The Faculty of Computer Science was officially founded on 1 April 1997 with the merger of the Technical University of Nova Scotia (TUNS) into Dalhousie University.

The Faculty of Computer Science traces its history to the School of Computer Science at TUNS and the Computer Science Division of the Department of Mathematics, Statistics and Computer Science at Dalhousie University.

Upon its founding, the Faculty of Computer Science took residence on the 15th and 16th floors of the Maritime Centre until the new Computer Science Building was completed in the fall of 1999. The new building was designed by Brian MacKay-Lyons and was featured in Canadian Architect in March 2000. It was renamed "Goldberg Computer Science Building" in June 2008 in recognition of a donation by Seymour Schulich and his wife, Tanna Goldberg-Schulich.

In July 2013, the Faculty launched the Institute for Big Data Analytics.

== Programs ==
The Faculty of Computer Science offers several undergraduate programs including:

- Bachelor of Computer Science (with/without Honours)
  - Data science Specialization
  - Artificial Intelligence Specialization
  - Cyber Security Specialization
  - Digital Media Specialization
  - Bioinformatics Specialization
- Bachelor of Applied Computer Science (with/without Honours)

In general, the philosophy of the undergraduate program is to build a solid foundation of mathematics and computer science during the first three years of the program, allowing students more flexibility in their fourth year.

The school offers a number of graduate level programs spanning fields such as bioinformatics, computational neuroscience, and machine learning.

== Notable people ==
- Erik Demaine, Professor at MIT
- Danielle Fong, Co-founder of LightSail Energy
- Paul Gauthier, Co-founder of Inktomi and CTO of Groupon
- Peter O'Hearn
