= Battle of Cape St. Vincent (1337) =

- Part of the Luso-Castilian War (1336–1339)
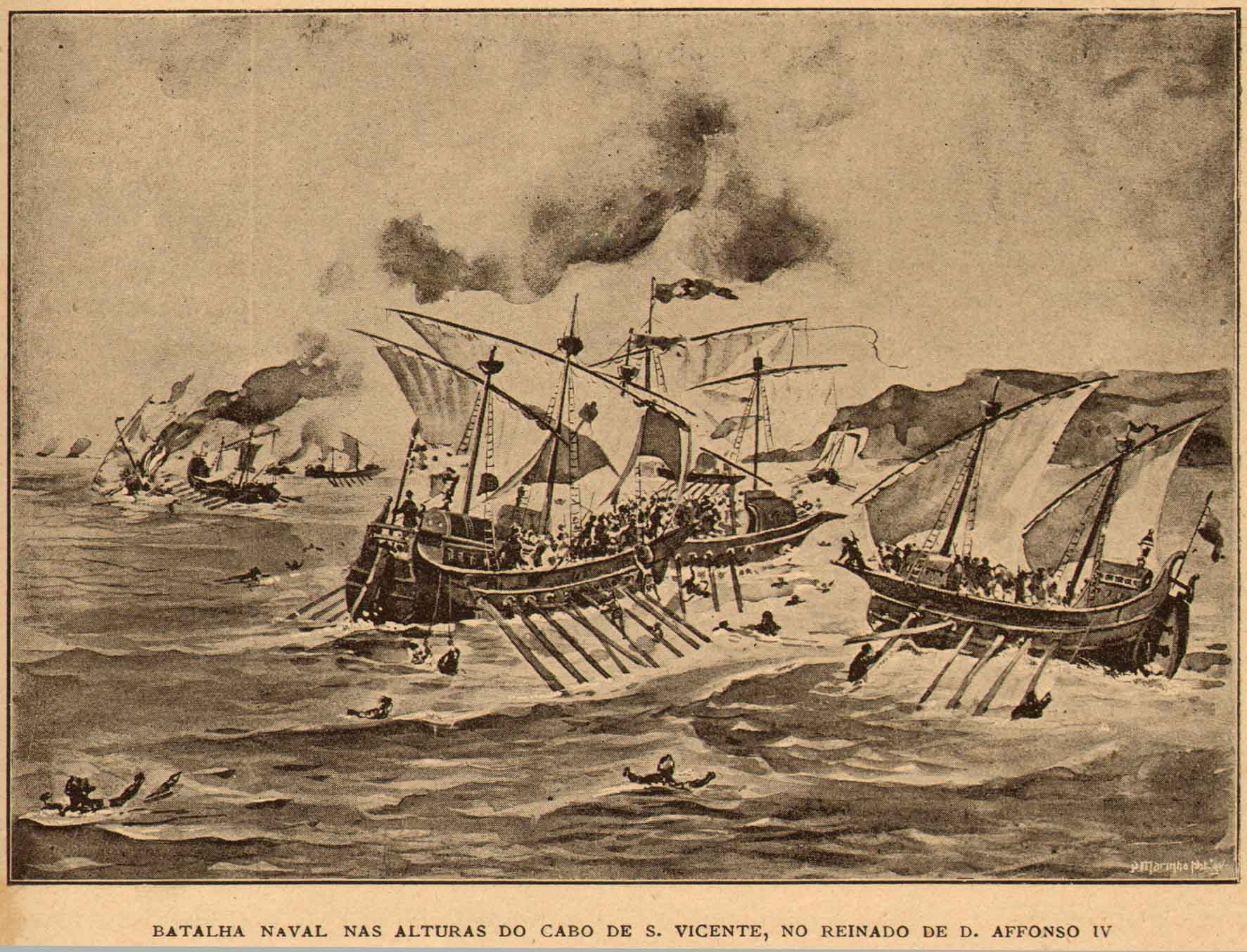
- Illustration by Alfredo Roque Gameiro
Date	21 July 1337
Location	Off Cape St. Vincent, Atlantic Ocean
Result	Castilian victory

Belligerents
Kingdom of Portugal	Crown of Castile

Commanders and leaders
(Kingdom of Portugal) Manuel Pessanha (POW)	(Crown of Castile) Alfonso Jofré Tenorio

Strength
20 galleys	30 galleys

Casualties and losses
14 galleys lost (8 captured, 6 sunk)	Uncertain

The Battle of Cape St Vincent of 1337 took place on 21 July 1337 between a Castilian fleet commanded by Alfonso Jofre Tenorio and a Portuguese fleet led by the Luso-Genoese admiral Emanuele Pessagno (Manuel Pessanha). The fledgling Portuguese fleet was defeated, bringing a quick end to the brief Luso-Castilian war that begun in 1336.

== Background ==
In 1328, the Alfonso XI of Castile married his cousin, Maria of Portugal, a daughter of his maternal uncle King Afonso IV of Portugal. But the marriage soon turned to scandal, when, shortly after, Alfonso XI dispatched Mary to a convent and took up openly with his mistress, Leonor Núnez de Guzmán.

Hoping to avail himself of disaffection among the Castilian nobility, Afonso IV of Portugal declared war on Afonso XI Castile in 1336, citing the mistreatment of his daughter.

The Genoese captain Emanuele Pessagno (Manuel Pessanha) had been hired by King Denis of Portugal in 1314 to develop a permanent navy. Pessanha, who was made the first admiral of Portugal in 1317, was eager to try out his new fleet. Soon after the declaration of war, the fledgling Portuguese fleet of 20 galleys, commanded by Pessanha, was dispatched to the coasts of Andalusia, intending to disembark a Portuguese amphibian force to seize Seville. However, the fleet was fended off and the landing prevented. Pessanha's fleet spent much of the remainder of 1336 off the coasts of northern Castile, supporting Afonso IV's invasion of Galicia. The Castilians responded with counter-invasions in the regions of Minho (led by Fernando de Castro) and the Alentejo (led by Alfonso XI himself).

In the Spring of 1337, Pessanha set out from Lisbon with a fleet of 30 galleys, to once again attempt a landing on the Andalusian coast. But simultaneously, a Castilian fleet of 40 galleys sailed out of Seville, under the Galician captain Alfonso Jofre Tenório (Señor de Mogue), probably intending a similar landing on the Portuguese coast. Violent tempests prevented an encounter, and both fleets, damaged by the storms, were forced to return to port for repairs. Both fleets set out once again in early July, Pessanha's Portuguese fleet now reduced to 20 galleys and Tenorio's Castilian fleet reduced to 30.

== The battle ==
The Portuguese and Castilian fleets finally met each other near Cape St. Vincent (the southwestern tip of Portugal). With the wind in their favor, the Portuguese gained the initial advantage and managed to seize as many as nine Castilian galleys early in the encounter. But the winds soon changed and the luck turned. Tenorio's Castilian fleet fell on the Portuguese and soon overwhelmed them with their larger numbers. Jofre Tenorio managed to capture the captain's galley and took Pessanha prisoner. With their admiral gone, the Portuguese fleet broke up and took flight, with the Castilian galleys in pursuit nearly all the way back to Lisbon. In all, the Portuguese lost 14 galleys: eight captured; six sunk.

== Aftermath ==
Alfonso Jofre Tenorio did not attempt a landing, but hauled his prizes back to Seville. The victorious admiral was greeted there by a delighted Alfonso XI. The Portuguese prisoners, including the admiral Pessanha, were paraded in triumph through the streets of Seville.

The defeat of the Portuguese fleet brought the Luso-Castilian war to a sudden halt. Afonso IV of Portugal reluctantly agreed to a truce mediated by the Bernard de Alby, Bishop of Rhodes (legate of Pope Benedict XII) and the Bishop of Rheims (envoy of Philip VI of France).

The final peace and reconciliation between Afonso IV and his son-in-law Alfonso XI was effected only two years later, with the Treaty of Seville in July 1339, mediated by Maria of Portugal. Among the treaty's provisions was a commitment by Afonso IV of Portugal to assist Alfonso XI of Castile against an impending Marinid invasion force, then assembling in Morocco. This would culminate in the Battle of Río Salado in October 1340.
