= Antonio Pessagno =

14th-century Genoese merchant, financier and administrator

Sir Antonio (di) Pessagno (c. 1280 – aft. 1334) was a Genoese merchant and administrator. He is known mainly from his activities in England and France. He was the chief financier of King Edward II of England from 1312 until 1319.

Pessagno belonged to a family of vicecomital rank long established in Genoa. The names of his parents, however, are unknown. His date of birth can be estimated by the fact that he was not yet 25 years old in 1313. His wife, Leona, belonged to the powerful Fieschi family, and his brother Emanuele became the hereditary admiral of Portugal in 1317. His own naval experience recommended him to Edward II's ministers.

In 1306–07, Pessagno was established in England as an exporter of wool. By 1310, he was supplying the royal court with luxury goods, such as spices, and modest loans. By 1311 no Italian merchant in England had more money on hand: 12,000 florins of Florence. In that year he became the first foreigner to take possession of the English crown jewels, including the Eagle Crown, as security on his loans. When the Lords Ordainers forced the Florentine firm of the Frescobaldi into bankruptcy before the end of the year, Pessagno was in a position to become, as a royal document of 5 April 1312 styles him, "the king's merchant" (mercator regis). At that time, the king already owed him £2,086. On 10 October 1312, he returned the crown jewels to the treasury. On 16 February 1313, a Frescobaldi agent could write that Pessagno "fears nobody … and is so generous in the court … that everybody likes him". By 1313 the king's debt had grown to £7,380.

In 1313–14, Pessagno received on behalf of Edward II the loans advanced by King Philip IV of France and Pope Clement V. He himself then loaned the king £21,000. These monies were used to finance the invasion of Scotland in June 1314. Pessagno also provided more than half the supplies used by the army. For his part in the Scottish war, Edward II knighted him on 1 November 1315.

During the Great Famine of 1315–17, Pessagno imported grain from the Mediterranean, much of it for the castles on the Scottish border. He held a monopsony (monopoly of purchase) on tin in Devon and Cornwall until 1316, when it was taken away following complaints. He was appointed seneschal of Gascony on 17 November 1317, but after a year he was removed from office following complaints against him by the Gascons in November 1318. By April 1320 his fall from grace was complete and he left England. He had not got on well with the Despensers, Edward II's new favourites. During the period lasting from April 1312 through January 1319, Pessagno loaned a total of £143,579 to the king—a higher annual average than any other royal banker under Edward I and Edward II. The interest he accrued, in the form of pledged "gifts", came to at least £6,782.

During the War of Saint-Sardos rumours circulated that Pessagno was planning a naval attack on England with Genoese and Portuguese ships. After the fall of Queen Isabella and Roger Mortimer in October 1330, Pessagno returned to England and was with the royal court at Christmas. He was recognized with the rank of banneret. Through the intervention of William Montagu, Earl of Salisbury, he secured repayment of an outstanding £8,141. Perhaps he had assisted Montagu in overthrowing Isabella and Mortimer.

Pessagno is last heard of when he was acting as an English envoy to the Papacy in 1334.

== Sources ==
- Fryde, E. B. (2004). "Pessagno, Sir Antonio (b. c. 1280, d. in or after 1334), financier and administrator". Oxford Dictionary of National Biography. doi:10.1093/ref:odnb/66134. ISBN 978-0-19-861412-8.
- Basso, Enrico (2015). "Pessagno, Antonio". Dizionario Biografico degli Italiani (in Italian). Vol. 82: Pazzi–Pia. Rome: Istituto dell'Enciclopedia Italiana. ISBN 978-88-12-00032-6.
