= Rui Valente =

Rui Valente (?-Faro, before 1481) was a Portuguese navigator and corsair based in Faro. He was a knight in the household of Prince Henry the Navigator, and after his death, integrated the close circle of the Portuguese king Afonso V the African, being a member of his majesty council and procurator of the treasury in Algarve.

Piracy over the sea traffic that crossed the strait of Gibraltar to the Atlanthic was some of the means to finance the Portuguese discoveries at an early stage.

At the start of his career, he had problems with the law, as proven by a statement from the magistrate of Faro who arrested him in 1451 when he was unloading his loot in Faro.

Later, he was present in the expedition to conquer Alcácer Ceguer in 1458.

In 1463, the king finally authorized his status as a corsair through the respective letter of privilege, in which he agreed that the sailor would keep one fifth of the loot.

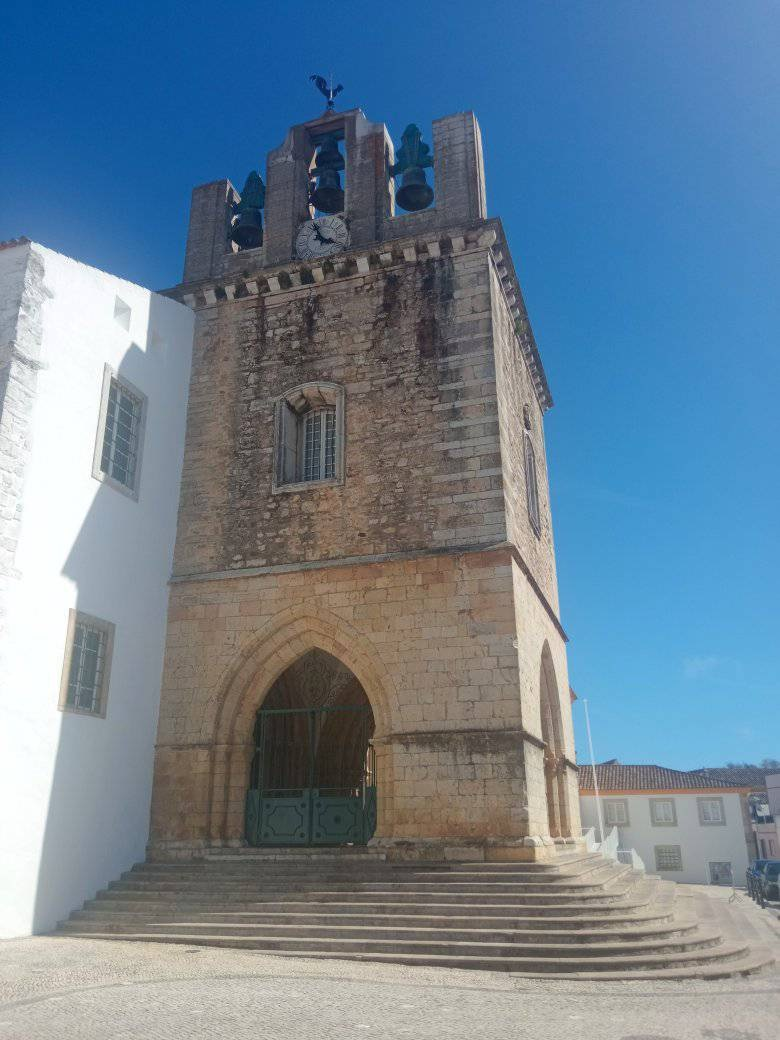
Faro Cathedral, where the tomb of Rui Valente is located

He must have died before the death of Afonso V, since a document from 1497 states that the same king appointed Diogo de Barros to replace Rui Valente, who had died.

His body is in a funerary urn surmounted by a tomb effigy of him in the chapel of São Domingos in the Church of Santa Maria, the Faro Cathedral.

His daughter Brites Valente married Álvaro Pessanha, a nobleman from the city of Tavira, belonging the Pessanha family, that descended from the genoese seafarer Emanuelle Pessagno, the first admiral of the Portuguese navy.
