= Brian MacKay-Lyons =

Canadian architect

Brian MacKay-Lyons CM
- Born: 26 August 1954 (age 72); Yarmouth, Nova Scotia, Canada
- Education: Technical University of Nova Scotia, University of California, Los Angeles.
- Occupation: Architect
- Awards: Governor General's Medal for architecture, RAIC Gold Medal
- Buildings: Dalhousie Faculty of Computer Science (1999), Ship's Company Theatre, Parrsboro, Nova Scotia (2004) and the Canadian High Commission in Dhaka, Bangladesh (2005), Two Hulls House, Sunset Rock House, Sliding House, Enough House, Cliff House

Brian Gerald MacKay-Lyons CM (born 26 August 1954) is a Canadian architect best known for his designs for houses on the coast of his native Nova Scotia, and his use of Atlantic Canadian vernacular materials and construction techniques. His life in Arcadia, its history, culture, landscape and architecture have been hugely influential to MacKay-Lyons. He is a founding partner of MacKay-Lyons Sweetapple Architects, and a professor at the Dalhousie University School of Architecture in Halifax. In 1994 he founded the Ghost Laboratory, a summer educational design-build on his family farm in Upper Kingsburg, Nova Scotia.

== Early life and education ==
MacKay-Lyons was born of part-Acadian heritage, growing up in Arcadia, a small river village of about four hundred people on the French Shore of southwest Nova Scotia. Arcadia has a dense history from generations of human settlements. MacKay-Lyons was strongly influenced by the region's history, Maritime landscape, architecture and functionalist design. He studied architecture at the Technical University of Nova Scotia (graduating 1978). During his first year of his undergraduate education, he was compelled to quit, though eventually decided to stay after being convinced by his professor, Larry Richards. Following the completion of his degree, he partnered with Larry Richards and Eric Fiss to form a practice called 'Networks'. He later pursued his Master's in Architecture and Urban Design from the University of California, Los Angeles, where he worked closely on Urban Design projects with Barton Myers and Charles Moore. During his graduate education he became a teachers assistant, which inspired him to eventually become a professor. Towards the end of his graduate degree, he moved to Italy to work with Giancarlo De Carlo in Siena. He also studied and worked in China and Japan.

== Career ==
In 1983, MacKay-Lyons returned to Nova Scotia to work on vernacular designs and to teach full time at Dalhousie University, where he holds a full professorship in architecture. After finding difficulty in starting an architectural practice while teaching, he began to teach part-time at the university, and continues to do so presently (as of 2020).

He began to create a large repertoire of residential projects, though his first buildings were urban.

Talbot Sweetapple was a student of MacKay-Lyons, and began to work for him while he was a single practitioner. In 1990 they renovated an old gas station on Falkland Street in Halifax, to use as an office, while also building an additional four town homes on site to finance the project. In 2005, Sweetapple became a partner of MacKay-Lyons, and Brian MacKay-Lyons Architecture and Urban Design became MacKay-Lyons Sweetapple Architects. MacKay-Lyons seeks to implement aspects of traditional practice in the relationships of the firm, such as encouraging the dynamic of apprentice to master-builder, as opposed to intern to architect. This is done to affirm a hands-on building approach, rooted in tangible experience.

Before MacKay-Lyons' partnership with Sweetapple, he was focused dominantly on vernacular rural homes on the coast of Nova Scotia, that he has described as being rooted in culture, yet contemporary. To accommodate for Talbot Sweetapple and the subsequent growth of their firm, they increasingly began to undertake urban, public projects in the late 1990s, including the Dalhousie Faculty of Computer Science (1999), Ship's Company Theatre, Parrsboro, Nova Scotia (2004), the Canadian High Commission in Dhaka, Bangladesh (2005) and the TUNS (Dalhousie) Architecture School. Some of these projects, namely the TUNS Architecture school, have been described as being of the 'folk-tech' style, which MacKay-Lyons has defined as being synonymous with 'low-tech', or utilizing cultural, vernacular methods. Some of his notable residential projects include Two Hulls House, Sunset Rock House, Sliding House, Enough House and Cliff House. The varying scale of these types of projects are continually linked through their consideration to landscape, climate and material culture as elements of place.

He has also held numerous visiting academic positions at universities in the United States, Canada and Germany. He is a five-time winner of the Governor General's Medal for architecture, fellow of the Royal Architectural Institute of Canada and honorary fellow of the American Institute of Architects. He was appointed to the Order of Canada in 2022, "for his contributions to architecture, notably through his vernacular designs that celebrate Nova Scotia culture."

== Ghost Lab ==
In 1994, MacKay-Lyons began an educational summer design-build program on his family farm near Kingsburg, Nova Scotia entitled the Ghost Architectural Laboratory. As of 2013 the program is no longer taking place, although architecture-related conferences are sometimes held at the same location in the summer. The laboratory arose from MacKay-Lyons dissatisfaction with the lack of connection between theory and practice in architectural education. Ghost was formerly described as an education initiative designed to promote the transfer of architectural knowledge through direct experience – project-based learning taught in the master builder tradition – with emphasis on issues of landscape, material culture, and community.

The word 'ghost' is used to convey a sense of travel across time. In the Maritime provinces of Canada, story telling is commonplace in daily life, and was also adopted by MacKay-Lyons in his building practices, and in the design-build. Each year it was run, a group of students, professors and architects were invited to participate, and were to divide their time equally between designing and building the structure. Every build centered around a different theme relevant to architectural discourse, such as Ghost 1, that discussed symbolic form, or Ghost 2 addressing technology. The lab was also continually related to the Arcadian history of the ancient site that was being built on.

== Design influences and philosophy ==
MacKay-Lyons was heavily influenced by his upbringing in Arcadia. He witnessed how the early settlers of Arcadia often tacked generations of their houses onto one another. He regards culture, history and architecture as being organic, with continuous, inherent connections to the landscape. Additionally, Arcadia's rich history, simple vernacular buildings and expansive landscape provided MacKay-Lyons with an appreciation for traditional building methods, and the importance of context to a place. He draws inspiration from observing unique qualities of the surroundings, such as climate, land form or cultural history, and uses this as a basis for his design work, as they are already existing and waiting to be discovered. He has stated that he is more interested in rediscovering something that has already been understood, than he is in inventing something new. He therefore believes that his buildings belong to the history of architecture.

In his essay Seven Stories From a Village Architect, titles from a compilation of short stories include simple structures such as Boat, Shed and Barn. He works with the archetypal quality of these structures to sustain Arcadia's traditional building typologies. As a child, witnessing the construction of these structures influenced MacKay-Lyons' in his practice and his idea of craft and the vernacular. He has described the vernacular as being a process or a cultural view connected to material culture and the culture of building. The vernacular has also shaped his view on sustainability, which he considers to be largely cultural. MacKay-Lyons believes cultural sustainability arises when local materials and building practices are used, and has stated that, 'vernacular is what you do when you can’t afford to get it wrong'. This continues into his ideas about economy and ethics, as Arcadia's first settlers were dominantly peasants and a modest way of living was virtuous. MacKay-Lyons adapted this cultural, democratic ethic in his work through the continued use of simple, quiet forms and traditional vernacular styles. He is dedicated to building at least one project a year under $100,000 to stay connected to his democratic ideals and vernacular methods. MacKay-Lyons believes that architecture can only be successful when it is both accessible and affordable. He desires to make buildings that are more silent but have more to say.

== Bibliography ==
- Local Architecture (2015), Princeton Architectural Press, ISBN 978-1-616-89128-2
- Ghost: Building an Architectural Vision (2008), Princeton Architectural Press, ISBN 978-1-568-98736-1
