= Manuel Pessanha =

14th-century Genoese-Portuguese admiral

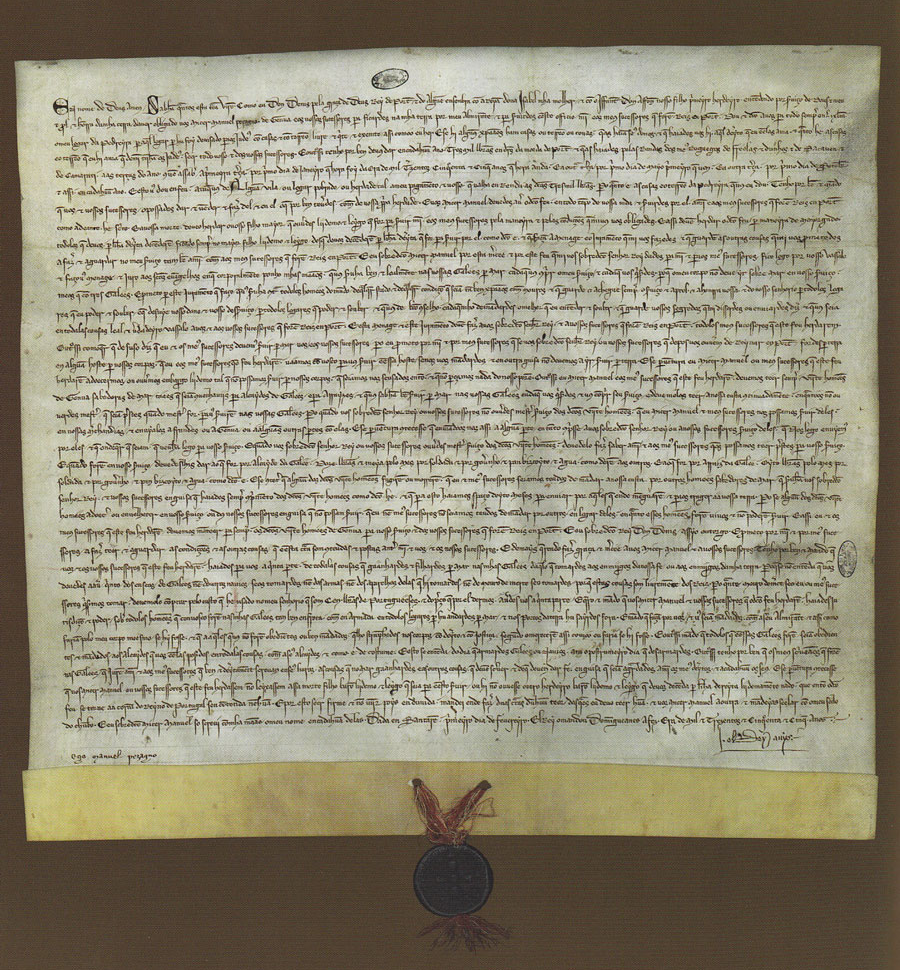
Royal charter of King Denis of Portugal, nominating Manuel Pessanha as first Admiral of the Portuguese Navy.

Manuel Pessanha (Portuguese translation of Italian Emanuele Pessagno) was a 14th century Genoese merchant sailor who served as the first admiral of Portugal at the time of King Denis of Portugal. His brother was the Genoese merchant and administrator, Antonio Pessagno.

Manuel Pessanha was the son of Simone, lord of the Castle di Passagne. In 1316–17 Manuel Pessanha reached an agreement with king Denis of Portugal, who appointing him to reform the new Portuguese Navy. Pessanha then employed twenty men from Genoa to be captains of the vessels. In a royal charter of 1 February 1317, Pessanha was appointed with the title of Admiral of Portugal (which would become hereditary in his family), entitled to a pension of 3,000 pounds, divided into three equal payments due in the months of January, May and September, and from rural incomes from several land possessions in Portugal. This contract was subsequently renewed later in 1317 and on 14 April 1321 and 21 April 1327.

He participated in the naval battles between Castile and Portugal during the reign of king Afonso IV of Portugal. He was taken prisoner by the Castilians in 1337 after the Battle of Cape St. Vincent, but released in 1339. On 30 October 1340 he commanded the Portuguese fleet that helped Castile in the Battle of Río Salado, fought off Cádiz, while the Moors' ships blocked Tarifa. In 1341, he participated in an attack on Ceuta, considered a nest of Moroccan pirates who regularly attacked the coasts of Algarve. His performance in this confrontation led to the Pope Benedict XII praising him in a bull which was sent to the Portuguese king.

He had two sons from his first marriage to Genebra Pereira, Carlos Pessanha and Bartolomeu Pessanha, both of whom would succeed him in turn as Admiral of Portugal, and a son from his second marriage to Leonor Afonso, Lançarote Pessanha, who also would be an admiral of Portugal, who was murdered at the Castle of Beja during the 1383–85 Portuguese interregnum.

Carlos and Bartolomeu, had no heirs, so the admiralty title passed through both of Lançarote's sons, Manuel II and Carlos II, until the 1430s, when lacking male heirs, the Admiral title would pass through the family's female lines through several Portuguese noble houses, ending up with the house of Azevedo in 1485 and the house of Castro (Counts of Resende) after 1660.

== See also ==
- Battle of Cape St. Vincent (1337)
- Admiral of Portugal

== Bibliography ==
- Diffie, Bailey (1960). Prelude to empire: Portugal overseas before Henry the Navigator. U of Nebraska Press. ISBN 0-8032-5049-5.
- Diffie, Bailey (1977), Foundations of the Portuguese Empire, 1415–1580, p. 210, University of Minnesota Press. ISBN 0-8166-0782-6
- FERREIRA, João Pedro Rosa. Manuel Pessanha. in: ALBUQUERQUE, Luís de (dir.); DOMINGUES, Francisco Contente (coord). Dicionário de História dos Descobrimentos Portugueses (v. II). Lisboa: Editorial Caminho, 1994. pp. 896–898.
