= Battle of Vega de Pagana =

- Part of the Reconquista
Date	October 28, 1339
Location	Vega de Pagana, southeast of Alcalá de los Gazules in what is now Los Alcornocales Natural Park
Result	Castilian victory

Belligerents
Kingdom of Castile: Order of Alcantara	Marinid dynasty Emirate of Granada

Commanders and leaders
Maestre of the Order of Alcantara	Abu Malik †

The Battle of Vega de Pagana (Winter, 1339) took place between forces loyal to King Alfonso XI of Castile against those mainly of the Marinid sultan Abu al-Hasan 'Ali.

== Campaign ==
In 1333-1334, Abu Malik had led the Marinid and Granadan forces to wrest Gibraltar from Castilian control. On February 26, 1334, a peace treaty was signed in Fez requiring the Muslim forces to refrain from offensive actions. In the intervening years, Abu Hasan was able to suppress a rebellion at Tlemcen. With the expiration of the peace treaty, Abu Hasan renewed his ambition of expanding holdings in Andalusia, and in 1338, Abu Malik began skirmishing along a front in Arcos de la Frontera, Jerez de la Frontera, and Medina Sidonia.

He engaged in a fierce battle at a site described as Vega de Pagana, and his forces were defeated, with many Christian losses. However, Abu Malik was killed. Most details of the conflict are unknown, including troop numbers and the exact combatants. The main significance of the combat was the death of the general who had reconquered Gibraltar.

The war would continue until the more decisive defeat of the Muslim armies at the Battle of Río Salado in October 1340. This latter battle would end Marinid incursions from Morocco into Spain. The people of Alcalá de los Gazules would erect a cross and altar in gratitude for this victory, and this in turn would lead to the consecration of the Sanctuary of Nuestra Señora de los Santos in that town.
