= Battle of Getares =

1340 naval battle during the Reconquista

Battle of Getares (1340)
- Part of Reconquista
Date	9 April 1340
Location	Playa de Getares, Algeciras
Result	Marinid victory

Belligerents
Marinid Sultanate	Kingdom of Castile

Commanders and leaders
Abu al-Hasan	Alfonso de Tenorio †

Strength
79 ships	51 ships

Casualties and losses
Unknown	35 ships captured

The Battle of the Getares, also known as the Battle of Algeciras, was a naval encounter between the Marinid fleet, under the command of Mohammed ben Ali al-Azafi, and a Castilian fleet led by Alfonso Jofré Tenorio. Fought in April 1340, the battle ended with the annihilation of the Castilian fleet.

== Background ==
In 1339, the Castilian king, Alfonso XI, launched a series of raids into the Granada territory; in response, Abu Malik Abd al-Wahid launched a military campaign to ravage the suburbs of Medina-Sidonia. He divided his army and attacked several places; however, the Castilian defenses proved effective. The Castilian army chased the Moors and defeated them in Vega de Pagana.

After this defeat, the Moroccan sultan, Abu al-Hasan Ali ibn Othman, decided to lead his own armies. Once Alfonso heard of this, he dispatched a navy under Alfonso Jofre de Tenorio to prevent the crossing of the Moroccans and supplies across the Strait of Gibraltar. The Aragonese-Castilian squadron guarding the straits met with some success when in September of 1339 the Aragonese defeated a small Marinid fleet at the Battle of Ceuta, but the death of the Aragonese admiral, Jofre Gilabert, caused the Aragonese ships to sail for home.

With the departure of the Aragonese, Tenorio found himself in a weakened position. The winter weather also attritted his fleet, leaving some of his ships under-manned.

== Battle ==
Abu Hassan crossed the strait and made their way to Gibraltar, evading Tenorio. The Castilians attempted to blockade Gibraltar; however, a powerful storm drove him off, allowing the Moroccans to cross the bay towards Algeciras. Tenorio attempted to blockade again; however, rumors spread aboard that he was bribed to allow the Moors to cross the strait. To ensure his loyalty, the Castilian king dispatched another 6 ships.

The Moroccans had a navy of 79 ships, consisting of 44 galleys and 35 lenos, while the Castilians had 51. The Hafsids of Tunis provided the Moroccans with some 20 ships. The Castilians were suddenly attacked by the Marinid navy. The Castilians were caught unprepared off the beach of Getares. The Moroccans attacked the galley of Tenorio; however, the Castilians bravely defended the ship and managed to repel the Moors three times. Despite their resistance, they were overwhelmed in the end, and Tenorio was beheaded and his head thrown in the sea while his body was taken as a trophy to the Moroccan sultan. The captives were taken to Ceuta, where they were paraded.

Out of 51 ships, 28 galleys and 7 naos were captured; 11 galleys that had not been engaged fled to Cartagena while the other 5 fled to Tarifa.

== Aftermath ==
Tenorio's failure to hold his navy together and low morale contributed to the Castilian defeat. Abu Hassan's fleet now lay unchallenged in the strait. Pope Benedict XII saw this disaster as divine punishment for the king's harsh treatment of the Master of Order of Alcántara. Alfonso was forced to seek help from Portugal, Aragon, and Genoa.

== Sources ==
- Clifford J. Rogers, John France, & Kelly DeVries (2002), Journal of Medieval Military History.
- Joseph F. O'Callaghan (2011), The Gibraltar Crusade, Castile and the Battle for the Strait.
