= Two Hulls House =

Residential property in Nova Scotia, Canada

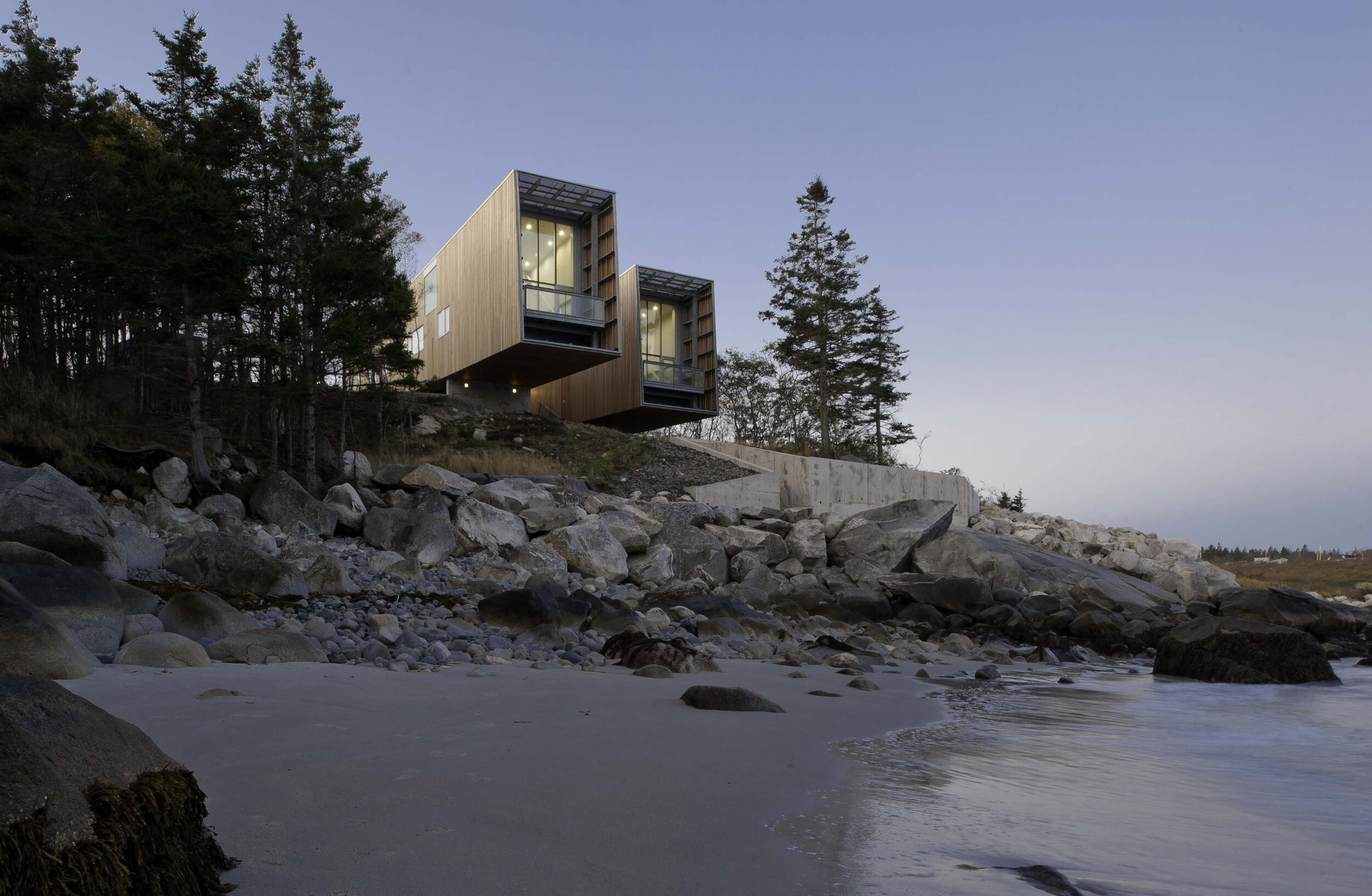

General information
- Location: Port Mouton, Nova Scotia, Canada
- Completed: 2011

Technical details
- Size: 3,360 sqft

Design and construction
- Architect: Brian MacKay-Lyons
- Architecture firm: McKay-Lyons Sweetapple Architects
- Awards: 2018 Governor General's Medal for Architecture 2016 AIA, International Region Honor Award for Open International 2014 Architizer Awards, People's Choice Award 2014 Mies Crown Hall America's Prize, Nominated 2012 Azure Magazine, AZ People's Choice Design Award 2012 Architectural Record, Record Houses Award 2011 Nova Scotia Lieutenants Governor's Medal of Excellence 2011 Canadian Architect Award of Excellence 2011 North American Wood Design Citation

The Two Hulls House is a residential property in Port Mouton, Nova Scotia, Canada. The project was designed by Architect Brian Mackay-Lyons and concluded its construction in 2011.

== Context ==
The form of the Two Hulls House draws inspiration and its name from its two extended pavilions at the front of the building which was designed to resemble the upturned hulls of a boat. Brian Mackay-Lyons' inspiration was acclaimed from his connection with boats as he grew up diverting himself in and around beached boats off the coast of his home in Arcadia. The House consists of courtyards that were designed by Brian to be habitable all year round as they provide protected spaces from the elements. and allow its inhabitants to more easily connect with the homes' natural surroundings.

== Architectural design ==
The building is situated on the edge of a small hill on the coastline of a beach littered with stone till and bedrock. The two hulls of the building are oriented to soar over the glaciated landscape and towards the waterfront.

=== Layout ===
The two Cantilevered pavilions of the building are placed asymmetrically as the left hull juts out slightly farther toward the shoreline than the right. The two cantilevered pavilion function as a day and night pavilion. The day pavilion houses rooms such as the Living Room and Office, and the Night pavilion houses the more private spaces such as the bedrooms and bathrooms, and the two pavilions are joined by a foyer that houses more commonly frequented spaces such as the Kitchen.

=== Structure and material ===
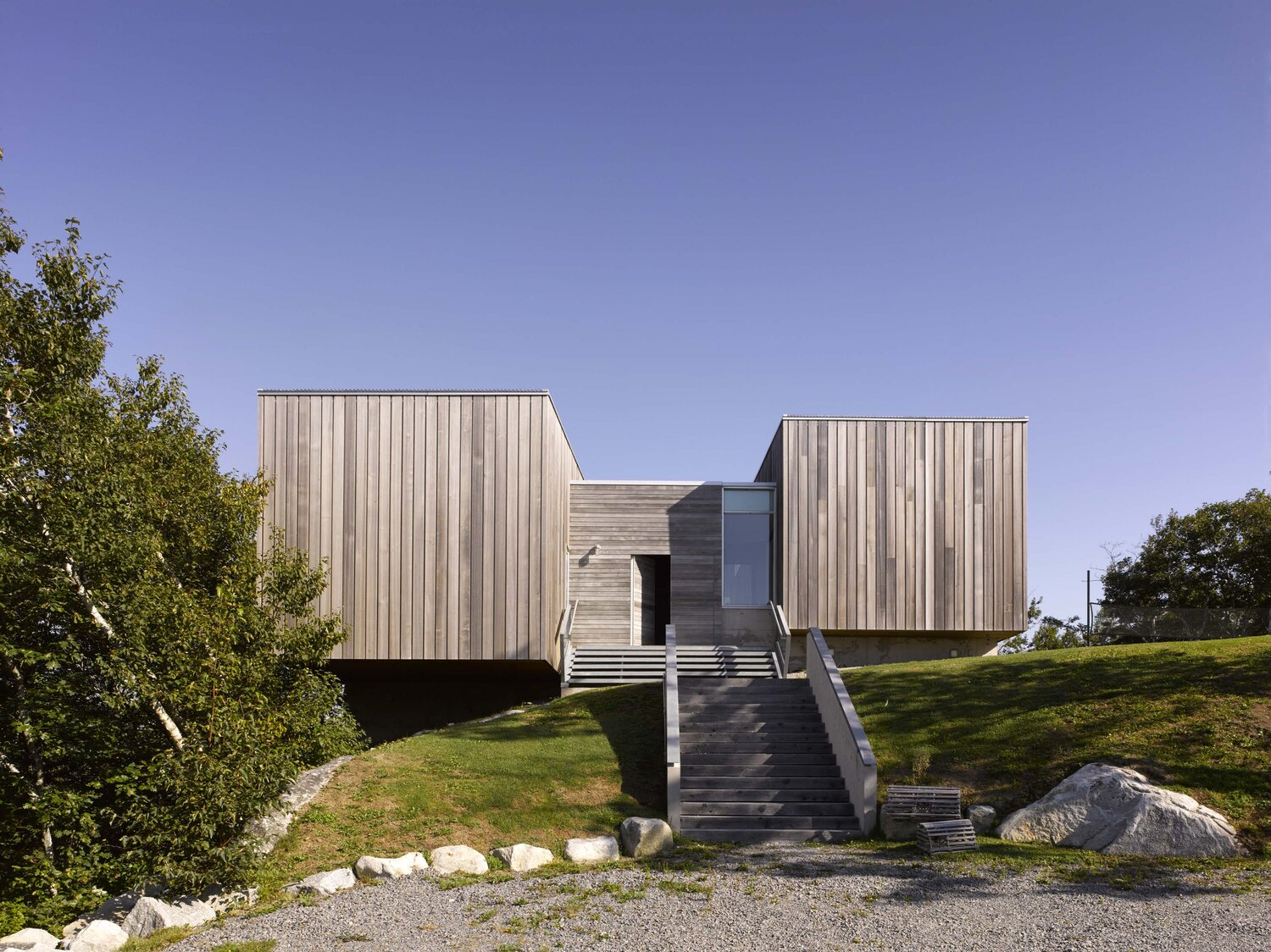
Entrance of the Two Hulls House showing the Foyer and The sheltered space

The house is built with a steel frame and a wooden board cladding with concrete piers. It is built in such a way as to provide an adequate amount of room to prevent any water from high tides or rough waves from reaching and eventually damaging the building. The dual-hull configuration was designed to have it better blend into its environment and complement the maritime feel of the area rather than detract from it.

=== Sustainability ===
The intent was to create a sustainable living space. Integrating natural ventilation systems and rainwater harvesting is part of the architectural composition, reflecting Brian MacKay-Lyons' eco-friendly approach. With the addition of these features, Brian sought to minimize the ecological footprint of their project. Some of the features include:

- Strategically positioned glazing and openings for harnessing natural lighting.

Each pavilion's tall end features floor-to-ceiling windows that let in enough natural light to minimize the need for artificial lighting, and the narrow buildings' cross ventilation system does away with the need for air conditioning.

- Passive solar heating.
- Rainwater harvesting.

== Awards and distinctions ==
- 2011 North American Wood Design Citation
- 2011 Canadian Architect Award of Excellence
- 2011 Nova Scotia Lieutenants Governor's Medal of Excellence
- 2012 Architectural Record, Record Houses Award
- 2012 Azure Magazine, AZ People's Choice Design Award
- 2014 Mies Crown Hall America's Prize, Nominated
- 2014 Architizer Awards, People's Choice Award
- 2016 AIA, International Region Honor Award for Open International
- 2018 Governor General's Medal for Architecture
