= Battle of Ceuta (1339) =

1339 Battle

- Part of the Battle of the Strait
- Emirate of Granada
Date	September 6, 1339
Location	Ceuta 35.8881°N 5.31194°W
Result	Christian victory

Belligerents
Crown of Aragon	Marinid Sultanate; Republic of Genoa

Commanders and leaders
Jofre Gilabert de Cruïlles; Galceran Marquet	Unknown

Strength
8 galleys	14 galleys

Casualties and losses
Unknown	Unknown

The Battle of Ceuta in 1339 was one of the battles of the Battle of the Strait.

== Background ==
The 14th century saw a gradual increase in fleets as the war in the Straits became more fierce. In 1334 a peace treaty was signed between Morocco, Granada and Castile and in 1336 Peter IV of Aragon agreed to extend the peace with Granada, but the peace could not be maintained for long time for conflicting ambitions.

The Marinid dynasty planned to reunify the Maghreb, taking Tilimsen in 1337, and the fleet of Alfonso XI of Castile was in the Straits of Gibraltar from the spring of 1338 and requested help from Peter the Ceremonious to complete the Straits fleet, signing the pact of Madrid, by which the two kingdoms pledged to help each other to wage war in Morocco and Granada while the Marinids did the same with the Hafsids.

Admiral Jofre Gilabert de Cruïlles left Barcelona on June 1 of 1339 with four galleys, to join Valencia with six other galleys and a galiot that from there set course for the Strait.

== Battle ==
On September 6 of 1339 in the Alboran Sea, in front of Ceuta a flock of eight gallers Catalans commanded by Jofre Gilabert de Cruïlles and Galceran Marquet defeats a naval force of thirteen Moroccan galleys and a Genoese.

== Aftermath ==
In 1340 Abu al-Hasan Ali ibn Othman north of the strait and the kings Alfonso XI of Castile and Afonso IV of Portugal left Seville in aid of Tarifa, defeating the Muslims. Then the Marinids, with morale high, crossed the strait under the direction of the sultan of Fes, Abu al-Hasan Ali ibn Othman and tried to recover Tarifa in 1340. Then the Catalan fleet defeated the Marínida in the battle of the Palmones river, the king of Morocco fled to Algeciras, from where he returned to his kingdom, and that of the Emirate of Granada passed to Marbella and then to its capital and the Catalans under the direction of Jordi Gilbert de Cruilles made an attack on Algeciras. In Tarifa the Castilians with the help of the forces of the Crown of Aragon (who unblocked the city by sea) and Portuguese (the king Afonso IV of Portugal was brother-in-law of Alfonso XI of Castile), they faced the Battle of Río Salado October 30 which was a serious defeat for the Maghreb. The take of Algeciras closed the Battle of the Strait and was a decisive step in the Granada War, by providing the Kingdom of Castile of the main port on the north coast of the Strait of Gibraltar and the city would be from then on the main base of action of the Christian armies.
