= Count of Resende =

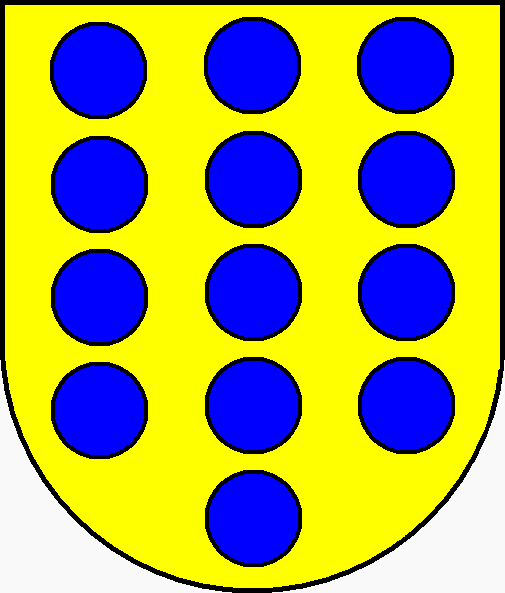
- Creation date: 9 June 1754
- Created by: Joseph I of Portugal
- Peerage: Kingdom of Portugal
- First holder: Dom António José de Castro, Admiral of Portugal
- Last holder: Dom António de Castro Pamplona (monarchy abolished)
- Present holder: João de Castro de Mendia (claimant)
- Remainder to: Hereditary in perpetuity (de juro e herdade), with honours of Grandeza
- Extinction date: 1910 (monarchy abolished)
- Seats: Counts of Resende Manor House, Vila Nova de Gaia

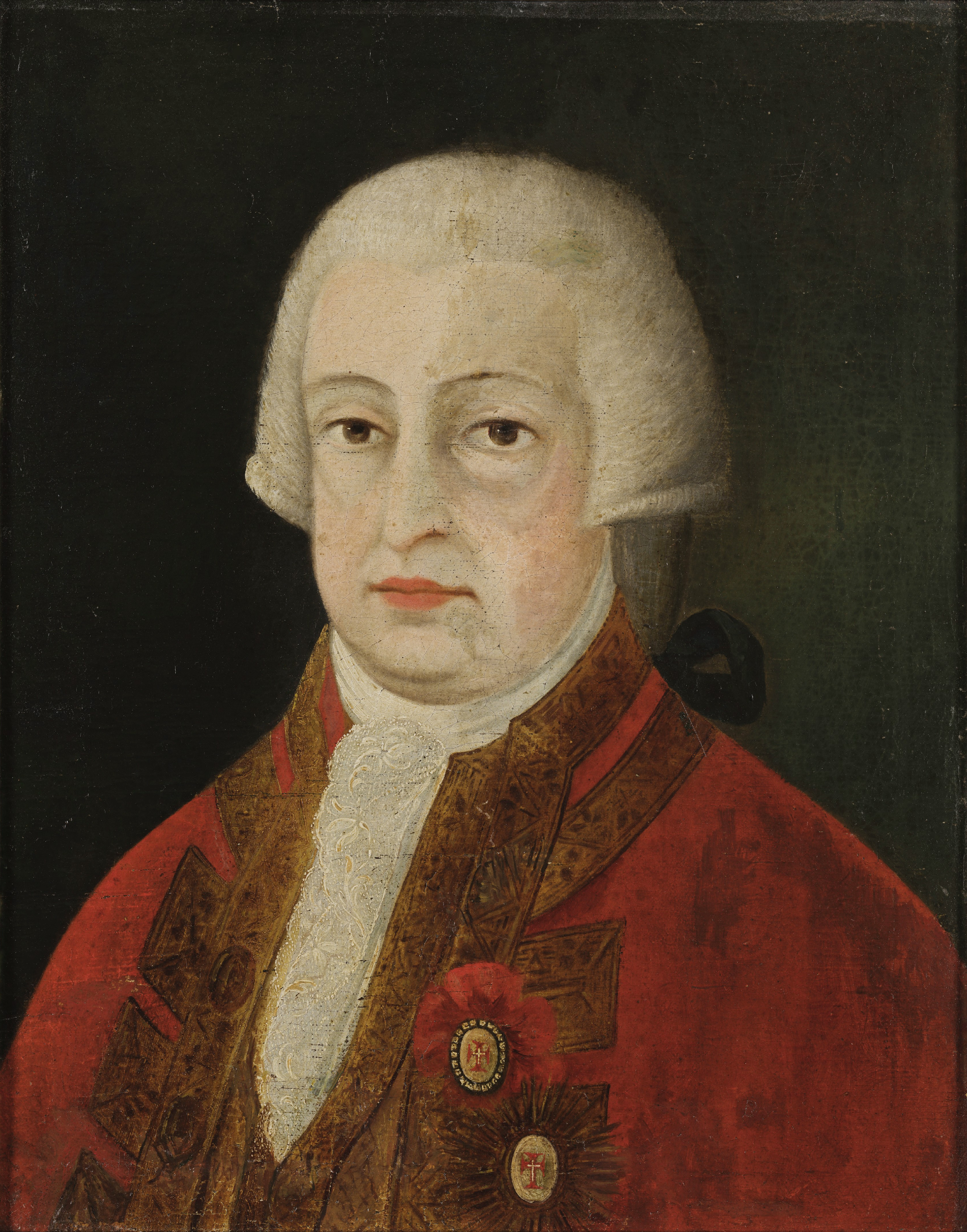
Dom José Luís de Castro, 2nd Count of Resende (1744–1819)

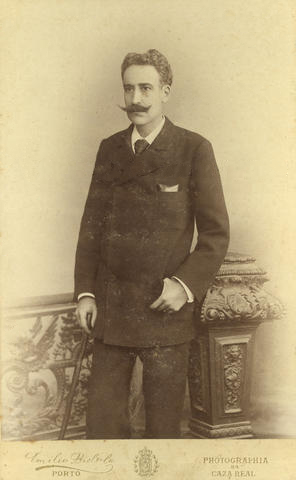
Dom Manuel Benedito de Castro Pamplona, 6th Count of Resende (1845–1907)

The Count of Resende (in Portuguese: Conde de Resende) was a Portuguese title of nobility created by King Joseph I by decree of 9 June 1754 for Dom António José de Castro, Admiral of Portugal. Its holders, of the branch of the Castro family bearing thirteen roundels, combined the title with the hereditary office of Admiral of Portugal. Seven counts held the title under the monarchy.

== History ==
=== Background ===
In the male line, the Counts of Resende belonged to the Castro lineage. This traces back to Dom Fernando, an illegitimate son of Sancho I of Aragon, who married Dona Maria Álvares, heiress to the Castro manor and daughter of Dom Álvaro Fernandes, lord of Castrojeriz and alcaide-mor of Toledo after taking part in its conquest.

Before the title was created, the Castro family already held a number of lordships and hereditary offices: the lordship of Penela, granted in 1378, that of Benviver, granted in 1424, and the entailed estate (morgado) of Resende, founded in 1465, together with the lordship of Reriz. It also held the office of Admiral of Portugal, created in 1317. The office came into the family through the marriage of Dom Simão de Castro, a twelfth-generation descendant of the founder of the line, to Dona Bernarda de Meneses, daughter and heiress of João de Azevedo, 10th Admiral of Portugal, and his first wife, Dona Joana de Meneses. Their son, Dom João de Castro, was already admiral and lord of those lands.

The house later passed to Dom Francisco de Castro (d. 1693), also admiral and captain of the Royal Guard of Archers, and from him to his sons. The eldest surviving son, Dom João José de Castro, inherited it while still a minor, and during this period the office of admiral was exercised by Lopo Furtado de Mendonça, 1st Count of Rio Grande. Dom João José died unmarried and was succeeded by his brother, Dom Luís Inocêncio de Castro, 14th Admiral of Portugal, captain of the Royal Guard of Archers and captain of Diu. In Brazil, Dom Luís Inocêncio also held the Captaincy of Ilhéus and the towns of Camamu, Boipeba, Cairu and Itaparica, with fifty leagues of land. In 1708 he married Dona Joana Cecília de Lancastre, a lady-in-waiting to the queen, and this marriage produced the future 1st Count of Resende.

=== Creation of the title and holders ===
The title was granted to Dom António José de Castro by letters patent of 9 June 1754, hereditary in perpetuity (de juro e herdade) and with three exemptions from the Mental Law (Lei Mental). The same letters confirmed him in the office of admiral, which was already hereditary in the family. The grant compensated the family for surrendering the Captaincy of Ilhéus and its associated towns, as part of the Marquis of Pombal's policy of returning Brazil's hereditary captaincies to the Crown. From the creation of the title the counts held the office of Admiral of Portugal, to which that of porteiro-mor (chief usher) of the Royal Household was added in 1834. The title was renewed for the 6th Count by decree of 20 April 1876.

The 2nd Count, Dom José Luís de Castro, was Viceroy of Brazil from 1790 to 1801, a period marked by the Inconfidência Mineira and the execution of Tiradentes. In his honour, the town of Campo Alegre was renamed Resende, now the municipality of Resende. One of his brothers, Dom António José de Castro, was Bishop of Porto and Cardinal Patriarch of Lisbon.

In the 19th century, the marriages of the 4th and 6th Counts brought the houses of the Viscounts of Beire and the Counts of Carvalhal into the family, and its heads thereafter also represented those titles. Two children of the 6th Count married children of the writer Eça de Queirós, their first cousins.

=== Properties ===
The Counts of Resende Manor House was bought by the municipal council of Vila Nova de Gaia on 30 October 1984, by a deed signed with João de Castro de Mendia, the representative of the title. The property is first documented in the Carta de Negrelos of 1042 and belonged in turn to several prominent families: the Baldaya, the Pamplona Carneiro Rangel (later Viscounts of Beire) and, from the 19th century, the Counts of Resende.

Manuel Benedito de Castro Pamplona, 6th Count of Resende, died at the manor in 1907. He was the brother-in-law of the writer Eça de Queirós, who had been his fellow student in their youth, and it was here that Eça met the count's sister, Emília, whom he married in 1886. During the 20th century the house was occupied by members of the family, by their tenants and later by the Sarmento Pimentel family. It is now a municipal cultural centre.

== Arms ==
- Arms: those of Castro (of the thirteen roundels), undifferenced, with a count's coronet.
- Shield: Or, thirteen roundels azure arranged in three columns of four, five and four.
- Crest: that of Castro: a demi-lion Or, armed and langued gules.

== Counts of Resende (1754) ==
#	Holder	Dates	Title	Notes	Ref.
1	Dom António José de Castro	1719–1782 (or 1801)	1st Count of Resende	First holder. Son of Dom Luís Inocêncio de Castro, 14th Admiral of Portugal, and Dona Joana Cecília de Lancastre. Born in São Salvador de Resende on 3 July 1719. According to Canedo, he died in Lisbon, in the parish of Santa Engrácia, on 10 December 1782; Silveira Pinto gives his date of death as 14 July 1801. 15th Admiral of Portugal, 5th captain of the Royal Guard of Archers, Councillor of State and president of the Overseas Council. On 12 January 1741, in the oratory of the house of the Counts of São Vicente on Calçada do Combro (parish of Santa Catarina), he married Dona Teresa Xavier da Cunha e Távora (1720–1783), daughter of Manuel Carlos da Cunha, 4th Count of São Vicente, and Dona Isabel de Noronha. They had fourteen children.	
2	Dom José Luís de Castro	1744–1819	2nd Count of Resende	Son of the preceding. Born in the parish of Santa Catarina, Lisbon, on 19 August 1744, he died at the Santa Clara Palace in Lisbon on 23 March 1819. 11th Lord of Penela, 13th Lord of Reriz and Benviver and lord of the entailed estate of Resende; 16th Admiral of Portugal, 6th captain of the Royal Guard of Archers and lieutenant-general in the army. He was Viceroy of Brazil and captain-general by sea and land of the states of Brazil from 1790 to 1801. On 11 September 1774, in the parish of Encarnação, he married Dona Maria do Resgate do Rosário de Noronha (1748–1822), daughter and heiress of Dom Lourenço de Noronha, governor of India, and Dona Ana de Almeida Portugal, daughter of the 1st Marquises of Alorna. They had twelve children.	
3	Dom Luís Inocêncio Benedito de Castro	1777–1824	3rd Count of Resende	Son of the preceding, whom he succeeded on 23 March 1819. Born in the parish of Santa Engrácia, Lisbon, on 5 September 1777, he died on 7 January 1824. Lord of Penela, 14th Lord of Reriz and Benviver and lord of the entailed estate of Resende; 17th Admiral of Portugal, 7th captain of the Royal Guard of Archers, field marshal, governor of the fortress of Abrantes and inspector of militias of the Alentejo; commander of Capa-Rosa in the Order of Christ and commander of the Order of the Tower and Sword. On 2 March 1813, in the parish of Santos-o-Velho, he married his first cousin Dona Maria José Inocência (or Emerenciana) da Piedade da Silveira (1792–1852), daughter of Dom Brás Baltasar da Piedade da Silveira and Dona Ana Isabel de Castro, a daughter of the 1st Count. They had five children.	
4	Dom António Benedito Maria do Coração do Santíssimo Sacramento e Castro	1820–1865	4th Count of Resende	Son of the preceding and his only surviving child, he succeeded as a small child on 7 January 1824. Born in the parish of São Sebastião da Pedreira on 30 November 1820, he died on 24 April 1865. Peer of the Realm from 1826, 13th Lord of Penela, 15th Lord of Reriz and Benviver and lord of the entailed estate of Resende; 18th Admiral of Portugal, porteiro-mor of the Royal Household, 8th captain of the Royal Guard of Archers and brevet captain of infantry; commander of the Order of Christ. On 8 October 1843, in the parish of Cedofeita, Porto, he married Dona Maria Balbina Pamplona Carneiro Rangel Veloso Barreto de Miranda e Figueiroa (1819–1890), daughter and heiress of Manuel Pamplona Carneiro Rangel Veloso Barreto de Miranda e Figueiroa, 1st Viscount of Beire, and Dona Maria Helena de Sousa Holstein; through this marriage the house of Beire was merged into that of Resende. They had eleven children.	
5	Dom Luís Manuel Benedito da Natividade de Castro Pamplona	1844–1876	5th Count of Resende	Eldest son of the preceding. Born on 30 August 1844, he died unmarried on 23 May 1876. He graduated in bridge and road engineering from the Polytechnic Academy of Porto and succeeded to his father's peerage, taking his seat as a Peer of the Realm on 10 May 1870; he was also Officer-Major of the Royal Household and 19th Admiral of Portugal. He left an illegitimate son, whom he acknowledged: Dom Luís de Castro Pamplona (1870–1935), a senior official of the Banco Nacional Ultramarino, who in 1905 married Dona Emília Maria das Dores Teles da Gama, daughter of the 1st Counts of Cascais. They were the parents of Manuel Luís de Castro Pamplona, husband of the 9th Countess.	
6	Dom Manuel Benedito de Castro Pamplona	1845–1907	6th Count of Resende	Brother of the preceding and second son of the 4th Count. He succeeded to the title and the house because the 5th Count died without legitimate issue, and the title was renewed for him by decree of 20 April 1876. Born on 19 October 1845, he died on 25 April 1907. 20th Admiral of Portugal and Officer-Major of the Royal Household. On 22 June 1876, on the island of Madeira, he married Dona Maria das Dores da Câmara (1855–1910), eldest daughter of António Leandro da Câmara do Carvalhal Esmeraldo de Atouguia Sá Machado, 2nd Count of Carvalhal, and Dona Maria Montufar Infante. On her father's death she came to represent that title, and the house of Carvalhal was merged into that of Resende. They had seven children.	
7	Dom António de Castro Pamplona	1877–1910	7th Count of Resende	Eldest son of the preceding. Born on 7 May 1877, he died unmarried and without issue on 10 May 1910.	

== Claimants under the Republic ==
Following the establishment of the Republic in 1910, the State stopped granting titles of nobility. Since then, the following members of the family have claimed to represent the title:

#	Name	Dates	Title claimed	Notes	Ref.
8	João de Castro Pamplona	1882–1924	8th Count of Resende	Brother of the preceding and third son of the 6th Count. He succeeded to the representation of the house after the deaths of his brother Dom Luís (1909) and of the 7th Count, who had no children. He also represented the title of Count of Carvalhal. Born on 16 September 1882, he died on 13 December 1924. On 15 July 1907 he married Dona Margarida Elvira Pereira Machado de Castro (1886–1977), daughter of Dr José Luís Fernandes de Castro and Dona Margarida Rosa Pereira Machado, herself a daughter of the Viscounts of Pereira Machado. They had two daughters.	
9	Maria José de Castro Pamplona	1908–1965	9th Countess of Resende	Elder daughter of the preceding. Born in the parish of Canelas, Vila Nova de Gaia, on 11 June 1908, she died on 26 February 1965. On 25 January 1941 she married her cousin Manuel Luís de Castro Pamplona (b. 1907), grandson of the 5th Count. They had no children.	
10	João de Castro de Mendia	b. 1946	10th Count of Resende	Nephew of the preceding, son of her younger sister, and grandson of João de Castro Pamplona. Born in Lisbon on 7 October 1946, he is the son of Maria Benedita de Castro (b. 1917) and the engineer Francisco de Assis da Nazaré de Almeida de Mendia (1895–1964), who married at Praia da Granja in 1941.	

== Family tree ==
The following family tree summarises the descent of the holders and claimants of the title, from the father of the 1st Count to the present day. Solid lines denote descent, and dashed lines marriage.

Dom Luís Inocêncio de Castro; 14th Admiral of Portugal
Dom António José de Castro; 1719–1782 (or 1801); 1st Count of Resende
Dom José Luís de Castro; 1744–1819; 2nd Count of Resende	Dona Ana Isabel de Castro
Dom Luís Inocêncio Benedito de Castro; 1777–1824; 3rd Count of Resende	Dona Maria José Inocência da Piedade da Silveira; 1792–1852 (granddaughter of the 1st Count)
Dom António Benedito de Castro; 1820–1865; 4th Count of Resende	Dona Maria Balbina Pamplona Carneiro Rangel; 1819–1890 (daughter of the 1st Viscount of Beire)
Dom Luís Manuel de Castro Pamplona; 1844–1876; 5th Count of Resende	Dom Manuel Benedito de Castro Pamplona; 1845–1907; 6th Count of Resende	Dona Maria das Dores da Câmara; 1855–1910 (daughter of the 2nd Count of Carvalhal)	Dona Emília de Castro married Eça de Queirós (1886)
Dom Luís de Castro Pamplona; 1870–1935 (illegitimate son of the 5th Count)	Dom António de Castro Pamplona; 1877–1910; 7th Count of Resende	Dom Luís de Castro Pamplona d. 1909	João de Castro Pamplona; 1882–1924 (claimant to the title of Count of Resende)	Dona Margarida Elvira Pereira Machado de Castro; 1886–1977 (granddaughter of the 1st Viscount of Pereira Machado)
Manuel Luís de Castro Pamplona b. 1907	Maria José de Castro Pamplona; 1908–1965 (claimant to the title of Countess of Resende)	Maria Benedita de Castro b. 1917
João de Castro de Mendia b. 1946 (claimant to the title of Count of Resende)
