= Marquês de Castro =

The title of Marquis of Castro was created in Portugal by royal decree on June 9, 1754, by King José I of Portugal, in favour of Domingos Fernandes de Castro. His father, António José de Castro, was the first Count of Resende.

This line of Castros are direct descendants of the King of Aragon Sancho Ramírez I (c. 1042–1094). The House of the Marquês de Castro had also close links with the Portuguese Royal family, as members of the King's Council, ambassadors, and viceroys. The current holder of the title is Jorge Castro-Correia who resides in the UK and Madeira.
