= Admiral of Portugal =

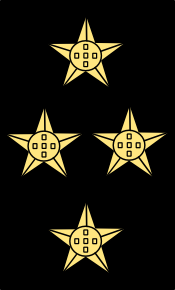
Portuguese Navy Admiral of the Fleet shoulder insignia

The high office of Admiral of the Kingdom of Portugal (Portuguese: Almirante do Reino de Portugal) as the head of the Portuguese navy was created by King Denis of Portugal in 1317 (or 1322) for the Genoese nobleman and naval officer Manuel Pessanha (Emanuele Pessagno). Although there is evidence that such a title existed before (e.g. Afonso I appointed his half-brother Fuas Roupinho to the title in 1184), it seems to have been of only a temporary character, for fleets assembled in times of war. The exception was perhaps Nuno Fernandes Cogominho who seems to have been appointed admiral by King Denis in 1307, and still had that title at his death in 1316, although the conditions are unclear. Nonetheless, Manuel Pessanha was the first person known to hold the title of Almirante-mor (Chief Admiral) as a permanent office for a permanent fleet. All the king's galleys were under his jurisdiction. The conditions of the Pessanha's title stipulated that he must maintain a corps of at least 20 Genoese naval officers at all times and was obliged to serve the king in military service on land as well as sea.

The office of Almirante-mor became a hereditary benefice in the Pessanha family - passing successively through his sons Carlos, Bartolomeu and Lançarote. After the disastrous handling of the Portuguese fleet in the blockade of Seville in 1369, Pessanha's son Lançarote Pessanha temporarily lost the admiral title to João Afonso Telo, 6th Count of Barcelos, but was later restored by King Ferdinand of Portugal. The title then passed on through Lançarote's sons Manuel II and then Carlos II, the last of the male line. Carlos II had no male heirs, but only two daughters (Genebra and Brites) and a niece (Catarina, daughter of his late brother Antonio, who had died at Aljubarrota).

In 1433, the title of Admiral went as dowry in the marriage of Genebra Pereira (daughter of Carlos II Pessanha) to D. Pedro de Menezes. After Menezes death in 1437, the title was passed on to his nephew Lançarote da Cunha (the young son of Carlos II Pessanha's other daughter, Brites Pereira), but the office was de facto exercised by Brites's husband, Rui de Mello da Cunha. Being pre-deceased by his son, Rui de Mello was appointed admiral de jure in 1453.

After Mello's death in 1467, the title passed to Nuno Vaz de Castelo Branco, the king's chamberlain and son of Catarina Pessanha, who in turn passed it on to his own son Lopo Vaz de Castelo Branco, c. 1476. After the treason and assassination of Lopo Vaz de Castelo Branco, John II of Portugal handed the title to Pedro de Albuquerque in 1483. But Albuquerque himself fell into intrigues and was soon deprived of the position.

In 1485, John II gave the title of admiral to Lopo Vaz de Azevedo, a knight of the Order of Aviz (and a relative of the Pessanhas), and made it hereditary in the Azevedo family. That line having lost male issue by 1646, it was passed via female lines to D. Luís de Portugal, Count of Vimioso, and then after his death in 1660, it passed on by female line to the House of Castro (Counts of Resende).

Around 1373 (exact date uncertain), the King created the office of captain-major of the fleet (capitão-mor da frota), initially a complementary position, covering the command of the alto-bordo ('high-sided', or sail-powered) ships of the fleet, leaving the Admiral exclusively in charge of the oar-powered galleys. The first capitão-mor was Gonçalo Tenreiro. During the reign of John I of Portugal, Tenreiro was succeeded by Afonso Furtado de Mendonça (appointment date uncertain) and, in 1423, by Álvaro Vaz de Almada (Count of Avranches). The letter appointing Avranches designates a more extensive capitão-mor, covering the royal galleys and infringing on the traditional jurisdiction of the almirante-mor, thus suggesting that by this time, the title of almirante had become purely honorific, and the de facto high naval command had been absconded by the capitão-mor. However, the letter appointing Ruy de Mello da Cunha as 'admiral' in 1453 temporarily restored his authority, including the 'alto-bordo' ships. In 1460, the admiral was deprived of his jurisdiction over arraes (fishing boats), which were passed to local councils.

The title of 'Admiral' was made more specific with the establishment in 1502 of the Admiral of the Indies (Almirante das Indias), a second, separate Portuguese admiral title for the East Indies. Back in 1492, Christopher Columbus had been granted the ornate title of 'Admiral of the Ocean Sea' by the Catholic monarchs of Spain. Evidently, King Manuel I of Portugal felt that if the Spanish had an admiral sailing around, then Portuguese should have one too. So, in January 1502, just before the departure of the 4th India Armada, Manuel I bestowed upon the fleet captain Vasco da Gama the title of Almirante dos mares de Arabia, Persia, India e de todo o Oriente ("Admiral of the Seas of Arabia, Persia, India and all the Orient" - or 'Admiral of the Indies' for short). The original 'Admiral' title became thereafter referred to narrowly as Admiral of the "Lusitanian Sea" (mar lusitano) (or simply, "Admiral of Portugal"). The Admiral of the Indies title remained hereditary with Gama's descendants, the Counts of Vidigueira.

== List of the Admirals of Portugal ==
The following is the list of title-holders of the "Admiral of the Reign/Portugal/Lusitanian Sea":

1. Nuno Fernandes Cogominho (not normally counted in the admiral numbering).
2. Manuel Pessanha.
3. Carlos Pessanha.
4. Bartolomeu Pessanha.
5. Lançarote Pessanha.
6. D. João Afonso Telo, 6th Count of Barcelos.
7. Manuel (II) Pessanha.
8. Carlos (II) Pessanha.
9. D. Pedro de Menezes, 1st Count of Vila Real.
10. Lançarote da Cunha.
11. Rui de Mello da Cunha.
12. Nuno Vaz de Castelo Branco.
13. Lopo Vaz de Castelo Branco.
14. Pedro de Albuquerque.
15. Lopo Vaz de Azevedo.
16. António de Azevedo.
17. Lopo de Azevedo.
18. João de Azevedo.
19. D. João de Castro.
20. D. Francisco de Castro.
21. D. João José de Castro.
22. D. Luís Inocêncio de Castro.
23. D. António José de Castro, 1st Count of Resende.
24. D. José Luís de Castro, 2nd Count of Resende.
25. D. Luís Inocêncio Benedito de Castro, 3rd Count of Resende.
26. D. António Benedito de Castro, 4th Count of Resende.
27. D. Luís Manuel Benedito da Natividade de Castro Pamplona, 5th Count of Resende.
28. D. Manuel Benedito de Castro Pamplona, 6th Count of Resende.
29. D. António de Castro Pamplona, 7th Count of Resende.
30. D. João de Castro Pamplona, 8th Count of Resende.
31. D. Maria José de Castro Pamplona, 9th Countess of Resende.
32. D. Maria Benedita de Castro, 10th Countess of Resende.
33. D. João de Castro de Mendia, 11th Count of Resende.

== See also ==
- Constable of Portugal
- Marshal of Portugal
