= Danielle Fong =

Canadian scientist and entrepreneur

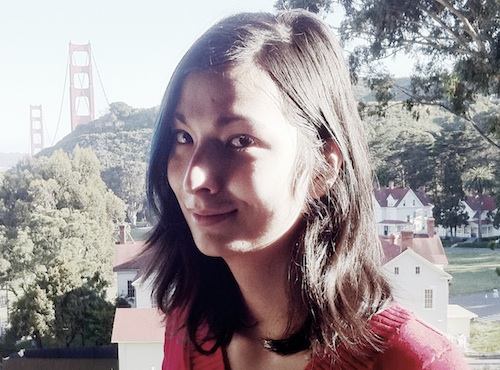
- Fong in 2011
- Born: October 30, 1987 (age 38); Halifax, Nova Scotia, Canada
- Education: Dalhousie University (B.S.); Princeton University (Ph.D., dropped out)
- Occupations: Co-founder of Lightcell; Co-founder and Chief Scientist of LightSail Energy
- Website: daniellefong.com

Danielle Fong (born October 30, 1987) is a Canadian scientist and entrepreneur. She was the co-founder and chief scientist of LightSail Energy, and as of late 2025 is working at another startup, LightCell Energy.

== Education ==
Fong was born in Halifax, Nova Scotia, and was raised in Dartmouth. At age 12, she enrolled in Dalhousie University, where she got her Bachelor of Science in Physics and Computer Science in 2005 at age 17. She joined the plasma physics program at Princeton University as a Ph.D. candidate, but later dropped out at age 20.

== LightSail Energy ==
In 2009 at Berkeley, California, Fong co-founded LightSail Energy with entrepreneur Stephen Crane and Edwin P. Berlin Jr. LightSail Energy developed a form of compressed air energy storage, which was termed regenerative air energy storage (RAES). The company was initially backed by Khosla Ventures.

In 2013, Fong stated she wanted to solve an energy problem and help democratize the storage of energy, in order to change how the average person lives in their home.

LightSail raised over $70 million, including $2 million from Nova Scotia's Innovacorp, a government owned enterprise. In 2016 it pivoted to producing transport modules for natural gas. It entered hibernation and shut down in 2018, with Khosla Ventures retaining the patents.

== LightCell Energy ==
In 2022, Fong founded Lightcell, an early stage company to design small self-contained devices which would turn fuel into electricity by heating salt until it radiates, absorbing that monochromatic light into specially designed solar cells, managing the heat produced, and recycling the sodium internally.

== Recognition ==
In 2011, Fong was featured in Forbes' "30 Under 30" entrepreneurs under the Energy category and interviewed by Forbes. She was named by the MIT Technology Review in their 2012 "Innovators Under 35" list. In 2013, Fong was included in Time's "30 Under 30" list.

Fong was a speaker at the Women 2.0 PITCH Conference & Competition in 2012.
