= LightSail Energy =

Compressed air energy storage technology startup

- Website type: Private
- Founded: 2008; 18 years ago
- Headquarters: Berkeley, California, {{{location_country}}}
- Founders: Steve Crane, Danielle Fong
- Key people: Steve Crane, CEO; Danielle Fong, CSO
- Industry: Energy storage
- Website: www.lightsail.com

LightSail Energy (2008–2018) was an American compressed air energy storage technology startup. The company shut down in 2018, failing to produce a product. The unused tanks were sold away to natural gas companies in 2016.

== Projects ==
A method of spraying the air with water droplets was proposed by LightSail to increase the efficiency of compressed air tanks. The company initially aimed to power an urban scooter. It later shifted its aim to fitting a compressed air-powered generator inside a standard shipping container. In 2014, the company received funding from Nova Scotia for a wind turbine project. This project did not come to fruition, costing the province $2M Canadian dollars. Starting in 2016, its remaining tanks were repurposed and sold off to the natural gas industry.

== Funding ==
Investors in LightSail include Khosla Ventures, Peter Thiel, Microsoft founder Bill Gates, Innovacorp, and oil supermajor Total S.A. In 2012, LightSail D-round founding rose 37.5 millions US$. It reached 55 employees in late 2014. By February 2016, LightSail had raised about $70 million in venture capital investment.

In December 2017, the company ran out of money. It cut the workforce down to 15 as it entered "hibernation". In March 2018, the company shut down. An investor cited the emergence of more efficient and cost effective Lithium-ion batteries as the reason for LightSail's commercial failure. Media specializing in startups and renewable energy have described the company as mismanaged.
