= Battle of Río Salado =

1340 battle in Spain

- Part of the Reconquista
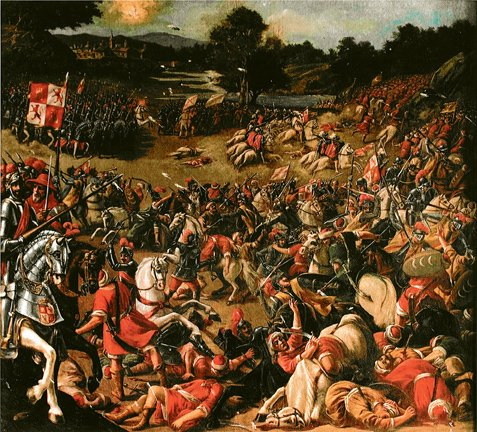
- Canvas of the battle by unknown 17th century author
Date	30 October 1340
Location	Salado River, near Tarifa 36°02′42″N 05°36′54″W
Result	Castilian–Portuguese victory

Belligerents
Crown of Castile; Kingdom of Portugal	Marinid Sultanate; Emirate of Granada

Commanders and leaders
Alfonso XI of Castile; Afonso IV of Portugal; Juan Manuel, Prince of Villena; Garci Lasso de la Vega II	Abu al-Hasan 'Ali; Yusuf I

Strength
at least 22,000 8,000 knights 12,000 infantry 1,000 knights 1,000 in Tarifa garrison	at least 7,000 fursān 60,000 (Christian claim of Ambrosio Huici); 7,000 fursān

The Battle of Río Salado (Note: Sometimes cited in English as 'Battle of Salado', mirroring the Spanish Batalla del Salado.) also known as the Battle of Tarifa (30 October 1340) was a battle of the allied Christian armies of King Alfonso XI of Castile and King Afonso IV of Portugal against the allied Muslim armies of Sultan Abu al-Hasan 'Ali of the Marinids and Emir Yusuf I of the Emirate of Granada.

== Campaign ==
After Alfonso XI of Castile's victory in the Teba campaign of 1330, Muhammed IV, Sultan of Granada sought help from Abu al-Hasan 'Ali to ensure his survival. The policies of the Kingdom of Fez regarding the Iberian Peninsula changed upon Hasan's rise to power in 1331. During his rule, the Marinids achieved their largest territorial expansion in Africa. Hasan dispatched a naval fleet and 5,000 troops that landed at Algeciras in early 1333. These forces assisted the Granadan Emir in capturing the Castilian outpost of Gibraltar, which they accomplished in under two months. They then launched a limited campaign to reunite these territories with those of Granada. Back in the Maghreb, Abu Hasan amassed a large army to invade Castile, aiming to reverse the Christian advances of the previous century.

This invasion represented a final attempt by the Marinids to establish a power base in the Iberian Peninsula. The Marinids mobilized a vast army and, after crossing the Straits and defeating a Christian fleet at Gibraltar, advanced inland to the Salado River near Tarifa, where they encountered the Christians.

== Preliminary moves ==
During the winter of 1340, Abu Hasan assembled his fleet: 60 war galleys and 250 other ships concentrated at Ceuta under the command of Muhammad ibn Ali al-Azafi. They landed an army at Gibraltar, and on 8 April 1340, 44 Muslim galleys and 35 leños met the Castilian fleet of 44 galleys and 7 naos, under Admiral Alfonso Jofre de Tenorio, in the straits at the Battle of Getares. Al-Azafi surrounded and destroyed the Castilian fleet; Tenorio died, 28 galleys and seven naos were captured, and only 11 of his galleys managed to reach Cartagena. Five reached Tarifa.

Abu Hasan crossed the Gibraltar straits on 14 August 1340, and throughout the summer, troops and supplies were transported to the Peninsula. On 22 September, the siege of Tarifa was formally established, with the help of Yusuf I. However, the Sultan made a crucial error: believing it would take the Castilians many months to rebuild their fleet, and hoping to reduce the high cost of maintaining his own, Abu Hasan prematurely laid up most of his galleys and returned those of his allies, leaving only 12 at Algeciras.

Meanwhile, Alfonso XI sought assistance from the King of Aragón and his father-in-law, King Afonso IV of Portugal. The latter sent a Portuguese naval fleet led by Manuel Pessanha, Admiral of Portugal, and also funded 15 Genoese galleys commanded by Micer Gil Bocanegra. With the addition of 27 ships quickly completed at Seville, the Christian fleets appeared in force in the Straits in October, cutting off supply routes between Morocco and the Peninsula.

Abu Hasan's position became precarious, as the troops besieging Tarifa depended on supplies from Morocco, and the Kingdom of Granada also needed them, having launched limited attacks along the frontier to keep the Castilians at bay. On 10 October, a severe storm wrecked 12 Castilian galleys, and the same day, the Sultan launched an all-out assault against Tarifa, which was barely repulsed with heavy losses on both sides.

Alfonso XI departed Seville on 15 October 1340 with a relief army, joining the King of Portugal the following day. They advanced to the Guadalete River and awaited further Castilian and Portuguese contingents. Finally, on 26 October, the combined army, now 20,000 strong, crossed into enemy territory. Upon learning of their advance, Abu Hasan ordered the siege lifted and his army took position on a hill between Tarifa and the sea. Yusuf I positioned his army on an adjacent hill. On the 29th, the Christian army reached Deer Hill (Hayar al-Ayyal), 8 km (5.0 mi) from Tarifa and barely 250 metres from the beach. Between them and their adversaries was a 4,500 m long valley crossed by the streams of La Jara and El Salado. With supplies dwindling, Alfonso XI decided to attack the next day.

During the night, Alfonso XI sent 1,000 horse and 4,000 foot troops to reinforce the Tarifa garrison, hoping to surprise the enemy rearguard during the battle. They met only slight resistance from the 3,000 light cavalry covering the Salado and reached Tarifa without difficulty. However, the officer commanding the light cavalry informed Abu Hasan that no Christians had entered Tarifa during the night. Whether this report was made in good faith or out of fear of admitting failure remains unknown, but this misinformation had serious consequences the next day.

== Opposing forces ==
A Spanish contemporary chronicle estimated Abu Hasan's army at 40,000 Muslim knights (fursān) and 400,000 infantry; the figures were considered greatly exaggerated by historian Joseph O'Callaghan. Another account suggested 53,000 knights and 600,000 infantry for the Moors. A third chronicler proposed 70,000 knights and 400,000 infantry for the Marinids and 7,000 knights and 700,000 infantry for Granada. Archbishop Gil de Albornoz claimed a combined Muslim force of 40,000 knights and 400,000 infantry. The lowest estimate comes from Rodrigo Yáñez's account, which stated that Abu Hasan deployed 60,000 men and that transporting the force across the Straits of Gibraltar took four months. O'Callaghan dismisses Yáñez's estimate. Granada had 7,000 knights, and the Marinids may have mobilized up to 60,000 men. A Christian militia likely fought for the Emir of Granada in the battle. One Marinid prince fought on the Castilian side.

The Castilians mustered 8,000 knights and 12,000 infantry. The Portuguese contributed 1,000 knights, and Tarifa had a garrison of 1,000 men who participated in the battle. Alfonso sent 3,000 Castilian knights to support the 1,000 Portuguese knights in attacking Yusuf's 7,000 Granadan knights on the left. The Castilian infantry consisted of municipal militias, stationed in the middle, and soldiers from Asturias and the Basque territories, armed and equipped with lances, crossbows, helmets, and shields, located next to Afonso IV's knights.

== Battle ==
The council of war decided that the Castilian King would attack the Sultan's main army, while the Portuguese host, reinforced by 3,000 Castilians, would engage Yusuf I. At nine o'clock on the morning of 30 October 1340, they moved out of camp, leaving 2,000 inexperienced militia to guard it. The strong Castilian vanguard was led by the Lara brothers, while the King himself rode in the main body. On the left were the missile troops from the Kingdom of León, led by Pedro Nuñez, and on the right, Alvar Pérez de Guzmán with a cavalry corps. Reinforcing the Portuguese forces were the Military Orders of Alcántara and Calatrava.

Abu Hasan left the Jara crossing undefended but deployed strong forces along the Salado. The Castilian vanguard met significant resistance; de Lara could not cross the shallow river. Alfonso reinforced them with 1,500 more knights, and the Salado was successfully crossed.

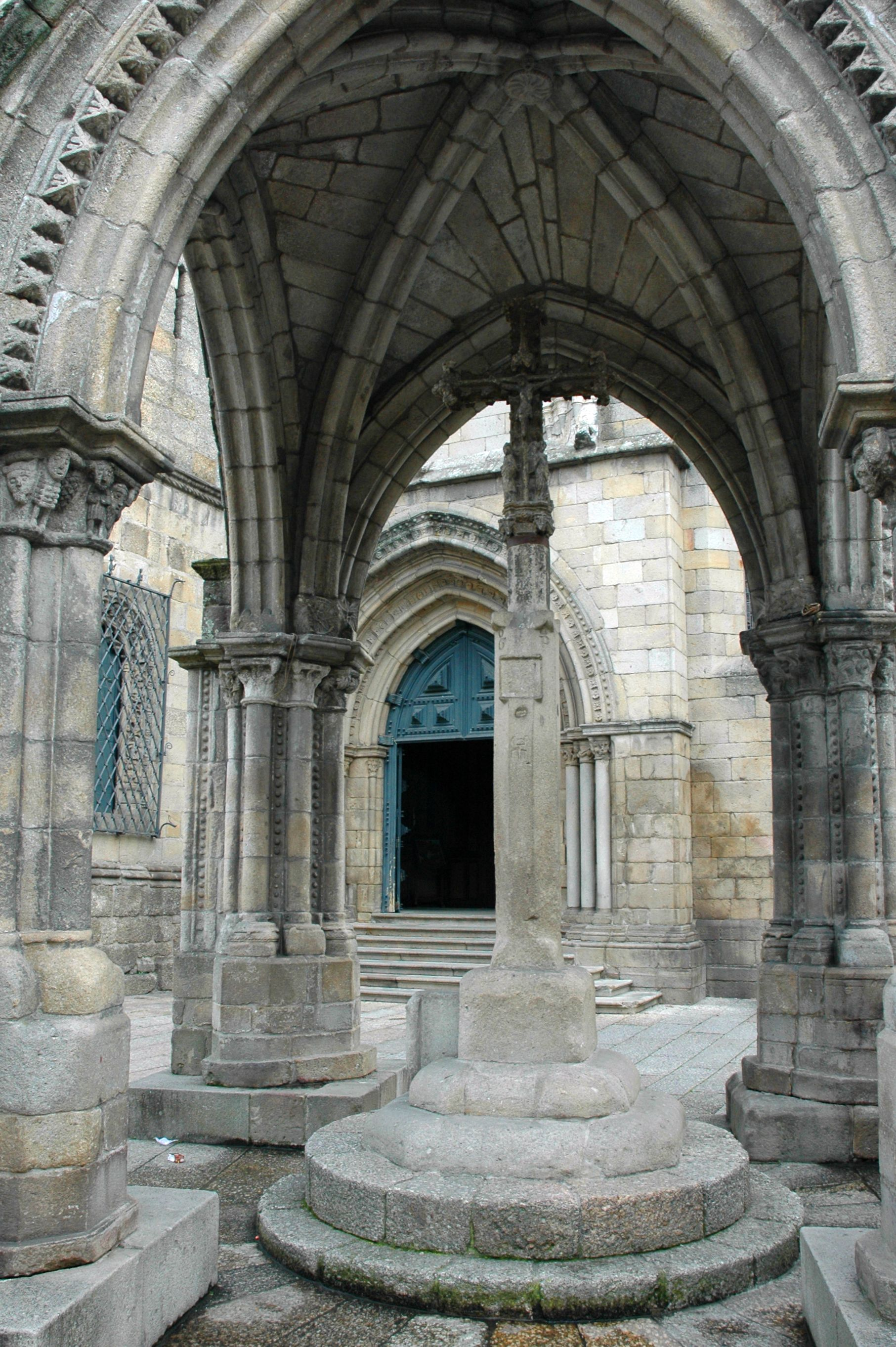
The Padrão do Salado, a monument in Guimarães commissioned by King Afonso IV of Portugal to celebrate the country’s victory at this battle

In the center, Juan Núñez de Lara and the Military Order of Santiago with 3,000 knights finally broke through the enemy line and crossed as well, riding up the hill where Abu Hasan's camp was clearly visible. The forces hidden in Tarifa also attacked the Sultan's camp simultaneously, and the troops defending it (about 3,000 horse and 8,000 foot) withdrew, half fleeing towards Algeciras and the other half joining the main struggle in the valley, where the Sultan's army was still largely intact.

Alfonso now found himself dangerously isolated, with the right wing at some distance and the vanguard attacking the enemy camp. Abu Hasan ordered a general attack, and the Castilian King was about to engage in hand-to-hand combat when the Archbishop of Toledo, Gil Álvarez Carrillo de Albornoz, grabbed his reins and stopped him. The timely arrival of the Castilian rearguard stabilized the situation, and when the forces that had been sacking the Sultan's camp advanced down the hill and engaged the enemy from the rear, Abu Hasan's surrounded army broke and fled towards Algeciras.

Meanwhile, the Portuguese military contingent had crossed the Río Salado, and when Pedro Nuñez reinforced them, the entire Granadian contingent broke and left the field. The battle lasted three hours, from 9 a.m. until noon.

The allied Castilian and Portuguese pursuit of the Muslims was relentless, ending at the Guadamecí River, 6 km from the battlefield, although many remained in the hills, looting the Sultan's rich camp. Little mercy was shown, and many of the Sultan's wives were killed, including his first wife Fatimah (daughter of the Sultan of Tunis) and Aysa (daughter of the noble Abu Yahya ibn Yaqub). Other relatives of Abu Hasan were taken captive, including his sister Umalfat, his son Abu Umar Tasufin, and his nephew Alí. Many notables were killed in the battle or the rout, such as Abu Tabit ibn Fath Allah, Abu Muyahid Gazi ibn al-Ka's, and Muhammad ben Yahya ben Abi Bakr, as well as the famous writer from Granada, Abdullah ben Salmun, and the popular imam Ibn al-Khatib.

Both Abu Hasan and Yusuf reached Algeciras; the Sultan took refuge at Gibraltar, and that same night crossed to Ceuta in a galley.

== Aftermath ==
The Marinids suffered a decisive defeat and retreated to Africa.

No Muslim army ever invaded the Iberian Peninsula again. Control of the Straits of Gibraltar was now in the hands of the Christians, specifically the Castilians and the Genoese. The war with Granada continued for ten more years, during which Alfonso XI made a few small territorial gains from the western part of Granada. Most importantly, the town of Algeciras, a valuable bridgehead held by the Marinids, was finally retaken after a two-year siege in 1344. This siege attracted volunteers from all over Europe due to extensive publicity. An attempt to recapture Gibraltar from the King of Granada was unsuccessful. However, Castile isolated the citadel from the rest of Muslim territory when peace was agreed in 1350, following the death of Alfonso XI in his camp during the Great Plague. Gibraltar would be captured by Castile in 1462.

== Sources ==
- O'Callaghan, Joseph F. (2011). The Gibraltar Crusade: Castile and the Battle for the Strait. Philadelphia, Pennsylvania: University of Pennsylvania Press. ISBN 978-0812223026.
- Hillgarth, J. N. (1976). The Spanish Kingdoms, 1250–1516. Vol. I. Clarendon Press.
