= List of science and technology articles by continent =

Animated, color-coded map showing various continents and regions. Depending on the convention and model, some continents may be consolidated or subdivided: for example, Eurasia is often subdivided into Europe and Asia (red shades), while North and South America are sometimes recognized as one American continent (green shades).

This is a list of Wikipedia science and technology articles by continent.

== Africa ==
- History of science and technology in Africa

=== North Africa ===
- Science and technology in Algeria
- Science and technology in Morocco

=== West Africa ===
- Science and technology in Cabo Verde

=== East Africa ===
- Science and technology in Malawi
- Science and technology in Tanzania
- Science and technology in Uganda
- Science and technology in Zimbabwe

=== Southern Africa ===
- Science and technology in Botswana
- Science and technology in South Africa

== Asia ==
- Science and technology in Asia

=== Eastern Asia ===
- History of science and technology in China
  - Science and technology of the Han dynasty
  - Science and technology of the Song dynasty
    - Song dynasty – technology, science, and engineering
  - Science and technology of the Tang dynasty
  - Science and technology in China
- History of science and technology in Japan
- Science and technology in Japan
- History of science and technology in Korea

=== Southern Asia ===
- History of science and technology in the Indian subcontinent
  - Science and technology in the Republic of India
- Science and technology in India
- Science and technology in Pakistan

=== Southeastern Asia ===
- Science and technology in Indonesia
- Science and technology in Malaysia
- Thailand National Science and Technology Development Agency
- Science and technology in the Philippines

=== Western Asia ===
- Science and technology in Armenia
- Science and technology in Israel
- Science and technology in Iran
  - Iran – Science and technology
- Science and technology in Turkey
- Timeline of science and engineering in the Islamic world
  - Science in the medieval Islamic world
  - Inventions of the Islamic Golden Age
  - Arab Agricultural Revolution
  - Science and Technology in the Ottoman Empire

== Europe ==
- Science and technology in Europe

=== Eastern Europe ===
- Science and technology in Bulgaria
- Timeline of Polish science and technology
- Science and technology in Romania
- Science and technology in Russia
  - Timeline of Russian inventions and technology records
  - Science and technology in the Soviet Union
- Science and technology in Ukraine

=== Northern Europe ===
- Science and technology in the United Kingdom

=== Southern Europe ===
- Science and technology in Albania
- Science and technology in Italy
- Science and technology in Portugal

=== Western Europe ===
- Science and technology in Belgium
  - Science and technology in Brussels
  - Science and technology in Flanders
- Science and technology in France
- Science and technology in Germany
- Science and technology in Switzerland

== North America ==
- Science and technology in Canada
  - Bibliography of science and technology in Canada
- Science and technology in Jamaica
- History of science and technology in Mexico
- Science and technology in the United States

== South America ==
- Science and technology in Argentina
- Science and technology in Brazil
- Science and technology in Colombia
- Science and technology in Venezuela

== See also ==
- Science and technology articles by decades
- Decades
- 1970s - 1980s - 1990s - 2000s - 2010s

- History of science and technology
- List of years in science
- Science, technology and society
