= Economy of Malawi =

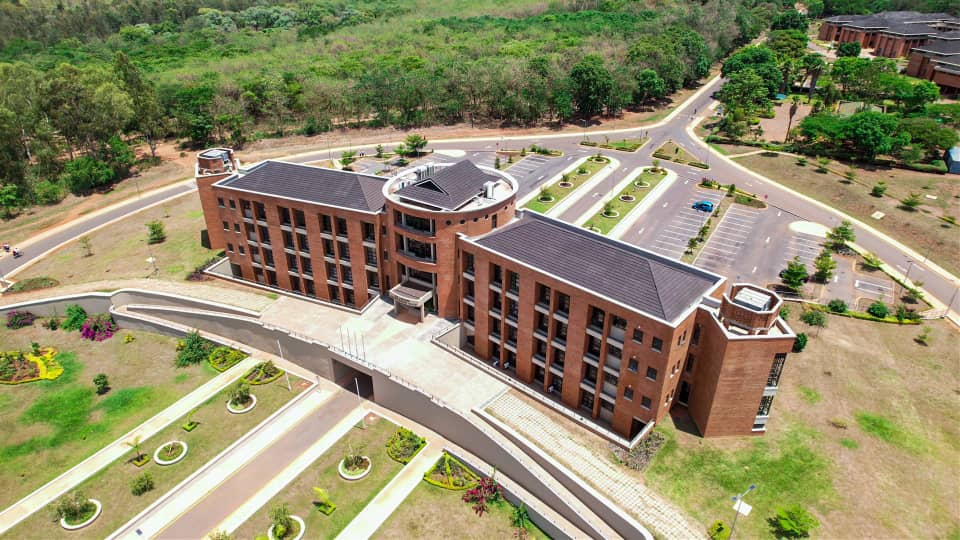
- Lilongwe University of Agriculture and Natural Resources
- Currency: Malawian kwacha (MWK)
- Fiscal year: 1 April – 31 March
- Trade organisations: AU, AfCFTA (signed), WTO, SADC, COMESA
- Country group: Least Developed; Low-income economy

Statistics
- GDP: ▲$13.96 billion (nominal; 2025); ▲$42.77 billion (PPP; 2025)
- GDP rank: 146th (nominal; 2025); 139th (PPP; 2025)
- GDP growth: 3.5% (2025)
- GDP per capita: ▲$580 (nominal; 2025); ▲$1,780 (PPP; 2025)
- GDP per capita rank: 187th (nominal; 2025); 181st (PPP; 2025)
- GDP per capita growth: -0.9% (2024)
- GDP by sector: agriculture 29.4%, industry 15.8%, services 56.1% (2016 est.)
- Inflation (CPI): 8.4% (2020 est.)
- Population below national poverty line: 51.5% (2016); 70.3% on less than $1.90/day (2016)
- Gini coefficient: 44.7 medium (2016)
- Human Development Index: ▲0.485 low (2018) (172nd); 0.346 IHDI (2018)
- Labour force: ▲8,156,049 (2019); 39.1% employment rate (2017)
- Labour force by occupation: agriculture: 76.9%, industry: 4.1%, services: 19% (2013 est.)
- Unemployment: 20.4% (2013 est.)

External
- Exports: $1.443 billion (2017 est.)
- Export goods: tobacco (55%), dried legumes (8.8%), sugar (6.7%), tea (5.7%), cotton (2%), peanuts, coffee, soy (2015 est.)
- Main export partners: 2017: Zimbabwe (13.1%); Mozambique (11.8%); Belgium (10.7%); South Africa (6.3%); Netherlands (5%); United Kingdom (4.7%); Germany (4.3%); United States (4.2%)
- Imports: $2.388 billion (2017 est.)
- Import goods: food, petroleum products, semi-manufactures, consumer goods, transportation equipment
- Main import partners: 2017: South Africa (20.7%); China (14.2%); India (11.6%); United Arab Emirates (7%); Netherlands (4.4%)
- FDI stock: $129.5 million (2014)
- Gross external debt: $1.861 billion (2017 est.)

Public finance
- Government debt: 50.8% of GDP (2013 est.)
- Foreign reserves: $364.2 million (31 December 2013 est.)
- Revenue: $1.347 billion (2013 est.)
- Spending: $1.4 billion (2013 est.)
- Economic aid: $1.174 million (2012)
- All values, unless otherwise stated, are in US dollars.

Malawi has a developing economy. It generates $7.522 billion by gross domestic product as of 2019, and is predominantly agricultural, with about 80% of the population living in rural areas. The landlocked country in south central Africa ranks among the world's poorest and least developed countries. Approximately 50% of the population lives below the national poverty line, with 25% living in extreme poverty.

In 2017, agriculture accounted for about one-third of GDP and about 80% of export revenue. The economy depends on substantial inflows of economic assistance from the IMF, the World Bank, and individual donor nations. The IMF and World Bank have spearheaded structural reforms in Malawi for decades.

== Sectors ==
In 2013, Malawi's manufacturing sector contributed 10.7% of GDP. The main industries are food processing, construction, consumer goods, cement, fertiliser, ginning, furniture production and cigarette production.

The government's attempts to diversify the agriculture sector and move up the global value chain have been seriously constrained by poor infrastructure, an inadequately trained work force and a weak business climate. In order to help companies adopt innovative practices and technologies, the National Export Strategy adopted in 2013 affords companies greater access to the outcome of international research and better information about available technologies; it also helps companies to obtain grants to invest in such technologies from sources such as the country's Export Development Fund and the Malawi Innovation Challenge Fund. In parallel, the government has raised its investment in research and development to 1% of GDP.

=== Agriculture ===
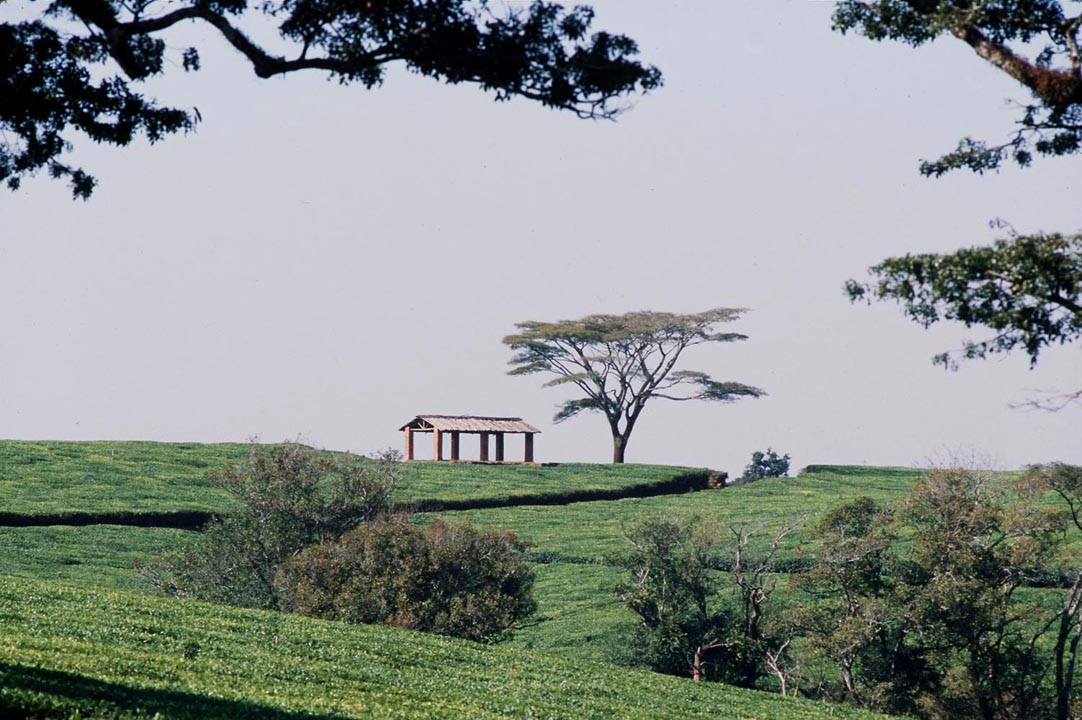
A Malawi tea estate

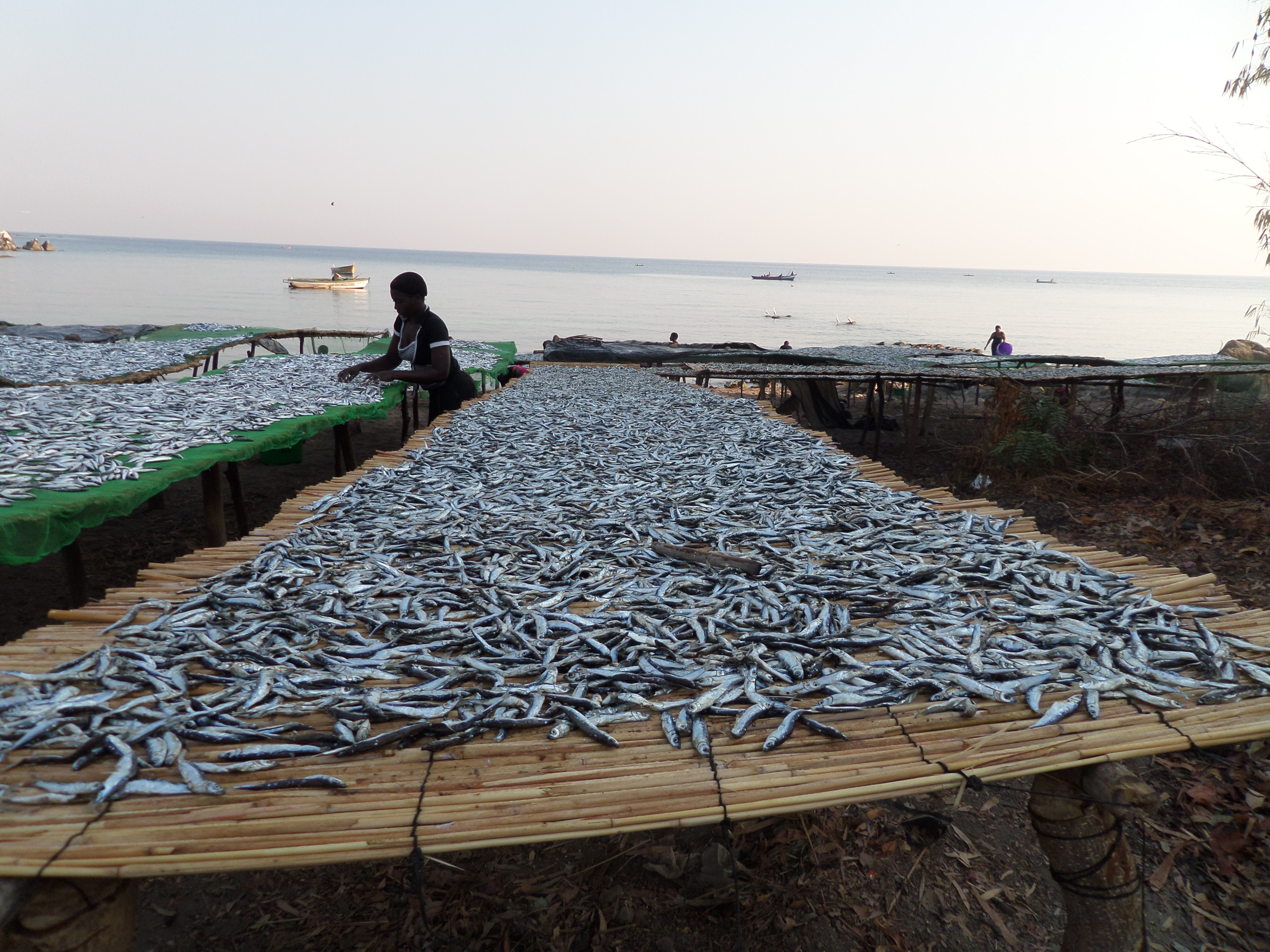
Dried fish on Likoma Island

Malawi's most important export crop is tobacco, which accounted for a third (30%) of export revenue in 2012. In 2000, the country was the tenth-largest producer in the world. The country's heavy reliance on tobacco places a heavy burden on the economy as world prices decline and the international community increases pressure to limit tobacco production. Malawi's dependence on tobacco is growing, with the product jumping from 53% to 70% of export revenues between 2007 and 2008.

The country also relies heavily on tea, sugarcane and coffee, with these three plus tobacco making up more than 90% of Malawi's export revenue. Tea was first introduced in 1878. Most of it is grown in Mulanje and Thyolo. Other crops include cotton, corn, potatoes, and sorghum; cattle and goats are also widely reared. Tobacco and sugar processing are notable secondary industries.

Traditionally Malawi has been self-sufficient in its staple food, maize (corn), and during the 1980s it exported substantial quantities to its drought-stricken neighbors. Nearly 90% of the population engages in subsistence farming. Smallholder farmers produce a variety of crops, including maize, beans, rice, cassava, tobacco, and groundnuts (peanuts). Financial wealth is generally concentrated in the hands of a small elite. Malawi's manufacturing industries are situated around the city of Blantyre.

Lake Malawi and Lake Chilwa provide most of the fish for the region. For many Malawians, fish is the most important source of proteins. Dried fish is not only consumed locally, but also exported to neighboring countries. Most fishing is done on small scale by hand. However, Maldeco Fisheries owns several commercial fishing boats and operates fish farms in the southern part of Lake Malawi.

Malawi has few exploitable mineral resources. A South-African Australian consortium exploits uranium at a mine near Karonga. Coal is being extracted in Mzimba District. Malawi's economic reliance on the export of agricultural commodities renders it particularly vulnerable to external shocks such as declining terms of trade and drought. High transport costs, which can comprise over 30% of its total import bill, constitute a serious impediment to economic development and trade. Malawi must import all its fuel products. Other challenges include a paucity of skilled labor, difficulty in obtaining expatriate employment permits, bureaucratic red tape, corruption, and inadequate and deteriorating road, electricity, water, and telecommunications infrastructure which hinder economic development in Malawi. However, recent government initiatives targeting improvements in the road infrastructure, together with private sector participation in railroad and telecommunications, have begun to render the investment environment more attractive.

The following are Malawi's top 20 agricultural production values and volumes for 2009. (Unofficial figures derived from FAO statistics)

Commodity	Production in International dollars (1000)	Production in tonnes	FAO source
Maize	462,330	3,582,500	
Cassava	404,764	3,823,240	
Tobacco	331,542	208,155	
Groundnuts	116,638	275,176	
Bananas (excluding plantains)	95,152	400,000	F
Sugar cane	82,093	2,500,000	F
Indigenous cattle meat	80,688	0	
Pigeon peas	80,274	184,156	
Beans, dry	75,706	164,712	
Fresh fruit	74,456	213,321	Im
Plantains	72,634	351,812	Im
Indigenous pig meat	68,788	0	
Tea	55,895	52,559	P
Indigenous goat meat	53,512	0	
Mangoes, mangosteens and guavas	49,527	82,659	Im
Cotton lint	39,017	27,300	F
Paddy rice	36,896	135,988	
Fresh vegetables	30,530	162,012	Im
Indigenous chicken meat	25,713	0	
Cow peas	18,073	72,082	

Key: F: FAO estimate, Im: FAO data based on imputation methodology, P: Provisional official data.

=== Food and beverages ===
Most fruits and vegetables are exported raw, while processed food is imported mainly from South Africa. Carlsberg opened its first brewery outside of Denmark in Blantyre in 1965. The brewery also bottles Coca-Cola products under licence. A mango processing plant for the export of fruit concentrate opened in Salima in 2013. Universal Industries operates several food factories in Blantyre, where it produces sweets, crisps, biscuits, milk powder, soy products and baby food. Coffee and tea are processed by half a dozen of different companies in the regions of Thyolo, Mulanje and around Mzuzu.

=== Forestry ===
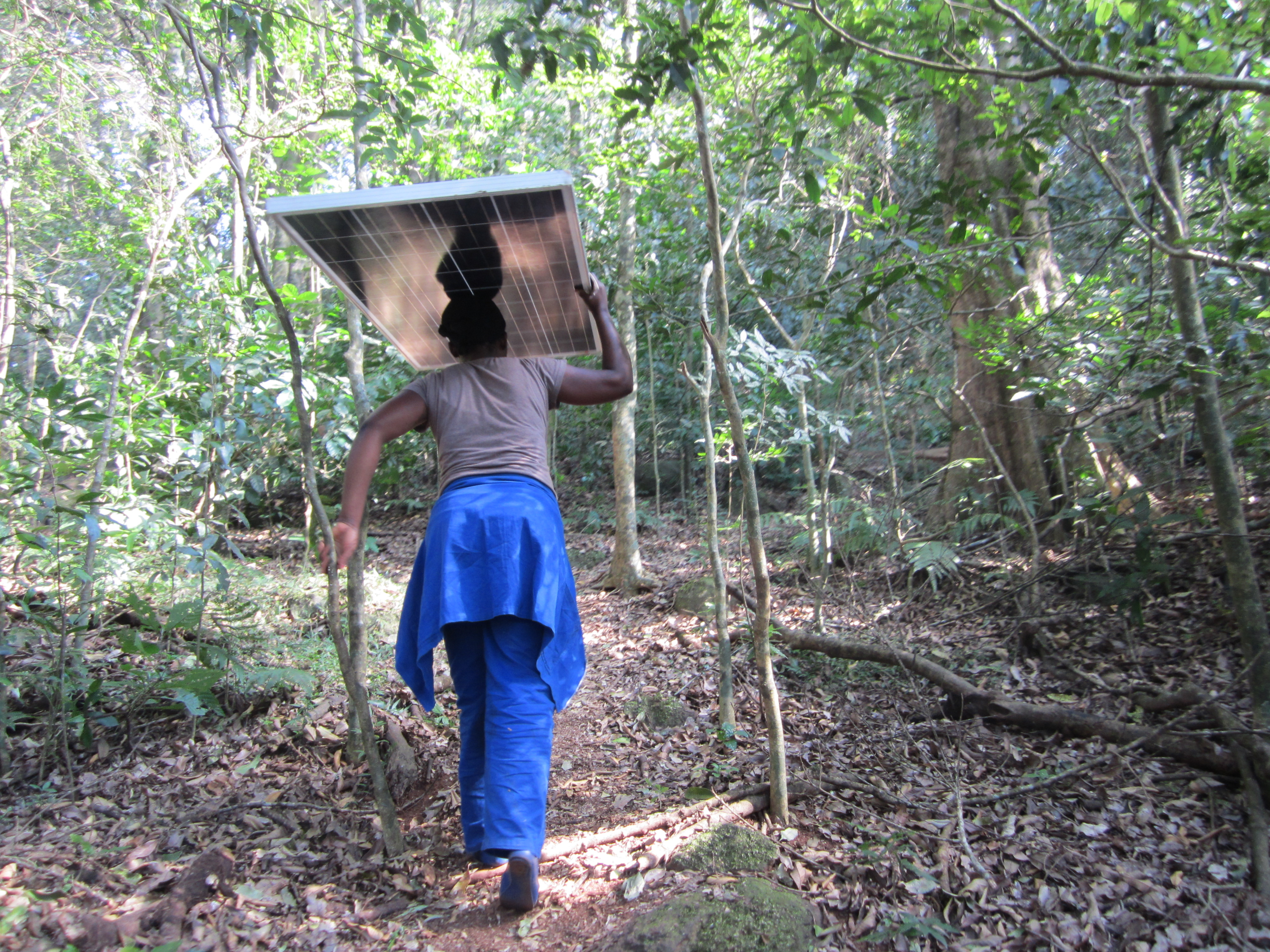
Lady carrying a solar panel.

Large man-made pine tree forests are located in the Viphya Mountains, around Mulanje and Zomba. Timber production for building materials and furniture is an important industry for these regions. However, most areas in Malawi suffer from deforestation due to illegal logging for charcoal production and the use of firewood.

=== Mining ===
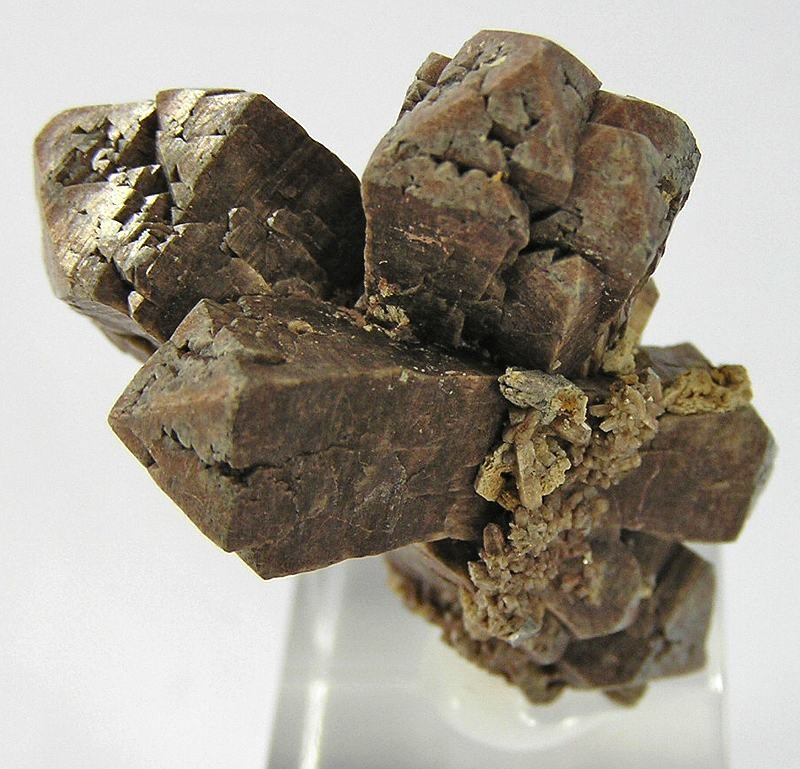
Zircon from Mount Malosa

The mining industry of Malawi, includes a number of gemstones and other minerals.

The value of mining is dominated by the extraction of fuel minerals, particularly uranium. Malawi's production of uranium has contributed 1% to the global production of this mineral. Since 2009, with new licenses granted to extract it from the Kayelekera uranium mine in Karonga District, in the northern region of the country, its production has contributed to an increase of Malawi's Gross Domestic Product (GDP) from 1% to 10% as of 2013. It is estimated that with increased emphasis on mineral extraction, the sector's contribution to GDP could be 20% by 2023. As of the financial year 2015–2016, the Government of Malawi reported that mining contributed less than 1%. This is attributed to suspension of production at Kayelekera Uranium Mine.

=== Services ===
The service sector accounts for 51.7% of Malawi's national GDP. Notable industries are tourism, retail, transport, education, health services, telecommunication and the banking sector. The Government of Malawi holds shares in many important companies, such as Malawian Airlines (51%) and Press Corporation Limited. Press Corporation Ltd. is the country's biggest company, with subsidiaries in the tobacco, banking, sugar, fishing, ethanol production, steel production, retail, telecommunication and petrol sectors.

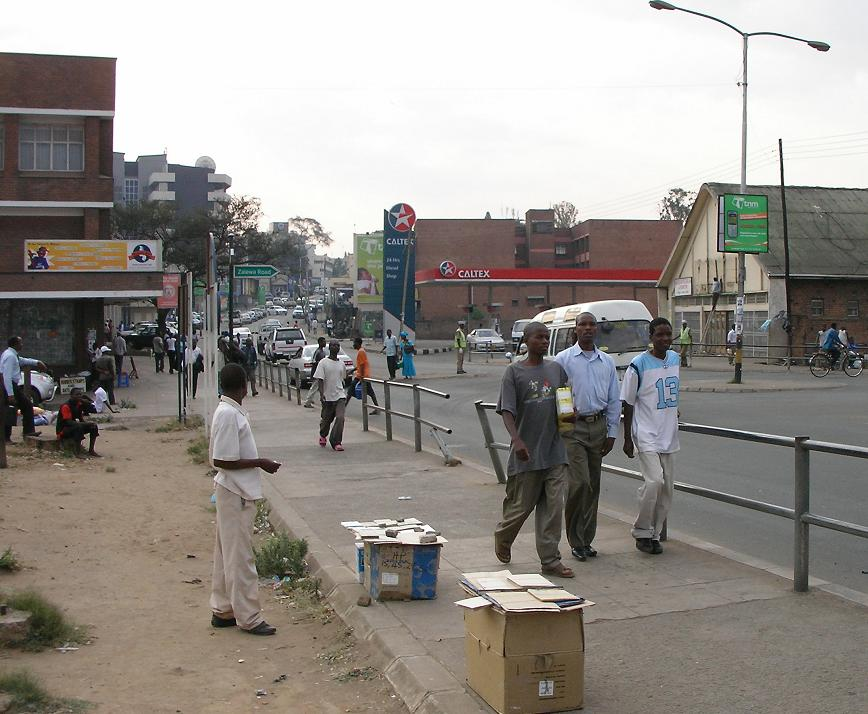
Roadside vendor in Blantyre.

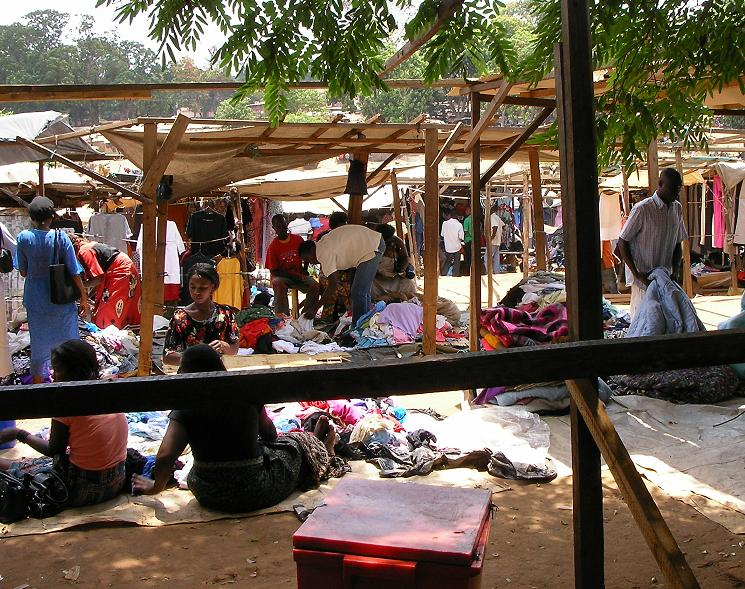
Market in Lilongwe.

==== Tourism ====
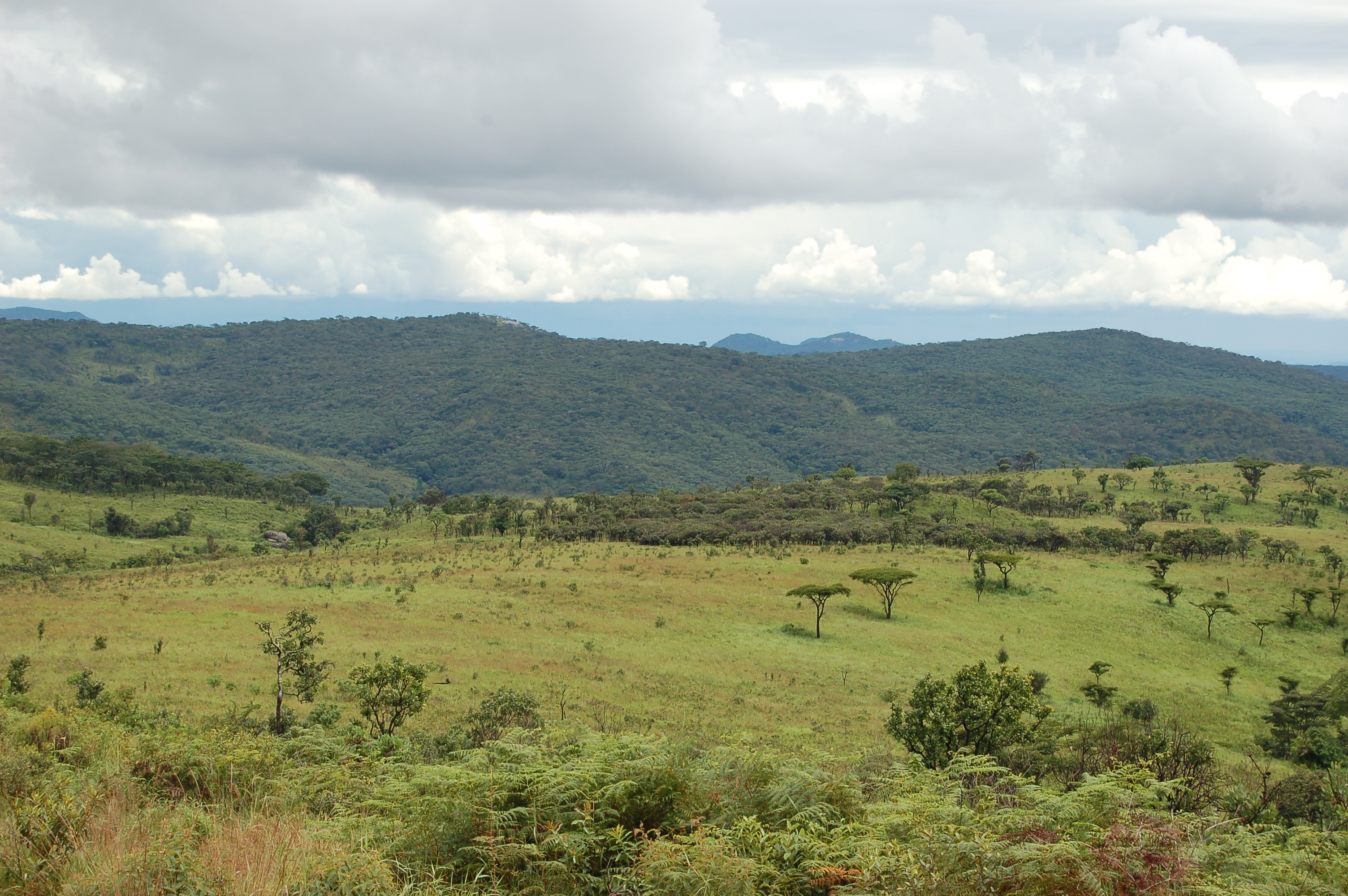
Nyika National Park

Malawi, officially known as the Republic of Malawi, is a country located in southeastern Africa. The country is also referred to as "The Warm Heart of Africa", due to the friendliness of the people.

Malawi has a variety of tourist attraction sites including Lake Malawi (29,600 km^{2}), several national parks, game reserves, and Mulanje Mountain. The tourism industry in Malawi has significantly grown since the mid-1970s, and the Malawian government is attempting to expand it further. The tourism industry was, however, significantly affected in the 1980s by an economic recession in South Africa—where most Malawian tourists come from. The sector was also greatly affected by the destabilisation of Zimbabwe but it has seen double-digit growth in recent years. Tourism contributed 4.5% to the national GDP in 2014 and provided 3.8% of all jobs.

=== Pharmaceutical companies ===
Malawi has four pharmaceutical companies. They manufacture a limited range of drugs, particularly those that are in great demand on the local market. These are Pharmanova Ltd., which is the biggest pharmaceutical manufacturer in Malawi, followed by SADM, Malawi Pharmacies (Pharmaceuticals Limited) and Kentam Products Limited.

== Infrastructure ==
=== Electricity ===
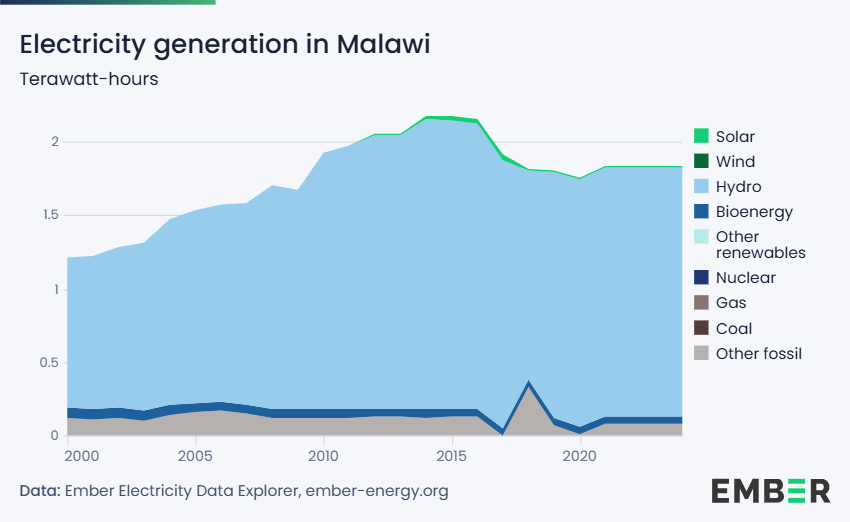
Electricity generation in Malawi in terawatt-hours

Malawi's sole power supplier is the state owned Electricity Supply Commission of Malawi (ESCOM), which generates almost all its power from hydroelectric plants along the Shire River whose installed capacity is approximately 351MW. About 15.6% of the country's population has access to electricity, according to 2023 World Bank figures.

In 2017 the country suffered from intermittent power outages as a result of an ongoing drought that halved power output as water levels of the Shire River dropped significantly. The river usually generates 300MW of electricity, accounting for 98% of Malawi's total supply. However, the drought reduced that capacity to 160MW, according to ESCOM.

=== Transport ===
Transportation in Malawi is poorly developed. The country of almost 23 million has 39 airports, 6 with paved runways and 33 with unpaved runways. It has 797 kilometres (495 miles) of railways, all narrow-gauge and about 45 percent of its roads are paved. Though it is landlocked, Malawi also has 700 km (435 mi) of waterways on Lake Malawi and along the Shire River.

=== Telecommunications ===
Communications in Malawi includes the country's postal, telephone, television, radio and internet services.

== International support ==
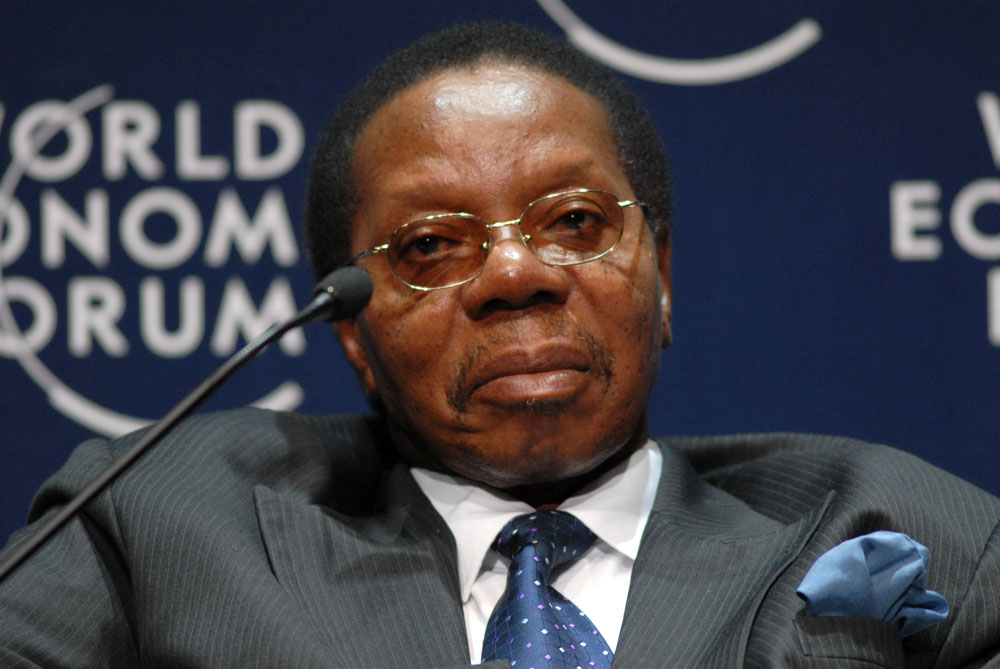
Former President Bingu wa Mutharika of Malawi spoke about the country's recent unilateral agricultural reforms at the World Economic Forum on Africa at the United Nations, September 2008.

Malawi has undertaken economic structural adjustment programs supported by the World Bank (IBRD), the International Monetary Fund (IMF), and other donors since 1981. Broad reform objectives include stimulation of private sector activity and participation through the elimination of price controls and industrial licensing, liberalization of trade and foreign exchange, rationalization of taxes, privatization of state-owned enterprises, and civil service reform. Malawi qualified for Heavily Indebted Poor Country (HIPC) debt relief and is in the process of refining its poverty reduction strategy.

Malawi has bilateral trade agreements with its two major trading partners, South Africa and Zimbabwe, both of which allow duty-free entry of Malawian products into their countries. The government faces challenges such as the improvement of Malawi's educational and health facilities — particularly important because of the rising rates of HIV/AIDS since 1986 — and environmental problems including deforestation, erosion, and overworked soils.

== Macro-economic trends ==
The following table shows the main economic indicators in 1980–2024. Inflation above 5% is in green.

Year	GDP (in bil. US$ PPP)	GDP per capita (in US$ PPP)	GDP (in bil. US$ nominal)	GDP growth (real)	Inflation (in Percent)	Government debt (Pct. of GDP)
1980	▲2.70	▲412	▲3.02	▲0.4%	▲19.2%	n/a
1985	▲3.88	▲503	▼2.76	▲4.6%	▲10.6%	n/a
1990	▲5.07	▲505	▲4.22	▲5.7%	▲11.9%	n/a
1995	▲6.45	▲605	▼3.41	▲13.8%	▲83.1%	n/a
2000	▲8.67	▲718	▲4.26	▲0.8%	▲29.6%	n/a
2001	▼8.50	▼689	▼4.18	▼ –4.1%	▲22.7%	n/a
2002	▲8.78	▼686	▲4.92	▲1.8%	▲14.7%	▲101.5%
2003	▲9.47	▲723	▼4.52	▲5.7%	▲9.6%	▼84.7%
2004	▲10.25	▲766	▲4.90	▲5.4%	▲11.4%	▼74.7%
2005	▲10.92	▲800	▲5.15	▲3.3%	▲15.5%	▼70.9%
2006	▲11.78	▲839	▲5.63	▲4.7%	▲13.9%	▼17.9%
2007	▲13.26	▲919	▲6.24	▲9.6%	▲7.9%	▲18.9%
2008	▲14.55	▲980	▲7.49	▲7.6%	▲8.7%	▲23.5%
2009	▲15.86	▲1,038	▲8.72	▲8.3%	▲8.4%	23.5%
2010	▲17.16	▲1,092	▲9.80	▲6.9%	▲7.4%	▼19.3%
2011	▲18.36	▲1,136	▲11.24	▲4.9%	▲7.6%	▲20.0%
2012	▲19.06	▲1,146	▼8.42	▲1.9%	▲21.3%	▲28.6%
2013	▲20.39	▲1,192	▼7.65	▲5.2%	▲28.3%	▲35.3%
2014	▲21.93	▲1,246	▲8.53	▲5.7%	▲23.8%	▼33.5%
2015	▲22.78	▲1,258	▲9.01	▲3.0%	▲21.9%	▲35.5%
2016	▲23.52	▲1,262	▼7.73	▲2.3%	▲21.7%	▲37.1%
2017	▲24.90	▲1,299	▲8.94	▲4.0%	▲11.5%	▲40.0%
2018	▲25.27	▼1,282	▲9.88	▲4.4%	▲9.2%	▲40.8%
2019	▲27.52	▲1,356	▲11.03	▲5.4%	▲9.4%	▲41.2%
2020	▲29.54	▲1,415	▲11.85	▲1.0%	▲8.6%	▲53.9%
2021	▲33.83	▲1,575	▲12.48	▲4.6%	▲9.3%	▲66.5%
2022	▲36.58	▲1,656	▲12.53	▲0.9%	▲20.8%	▲76.7%
2023	▲38.45	▲1,692	▲12.67	▲1.5%	▲28.8%	▲91.3%
2024	▲40.07	▲1,714	▼10.84	▲1.8%	▲30.6%	▼84.5%

== Economic indicators ==
Exports of Malawi by product category (2019) Chemical products Transportation Machines Mineral products Plastics and rubbers Metals Foodstuffs Precious metals Textiles Instruments Animal products Vegetable products Paper goods Footwear and headwear Miscellaneous Stone and glass Wood products Animal and vegetable bi-products Animal hides Arts and antiques Weapons

The following figures are taken from the CIA World Factbook, unless otherwise indicated.

GDP: purchasing power parity = $22.37 billion (2017 est.)

GDP – real growth rate: 4% (2017 est.)

GDP – per capita: purchasing power parity – $1200 (2017 est.)

GDP – composition by sector:
agriculture: 28.1%
industry: 15.8%
services: 56.1% (2016 est.)

Population below poverty line: 50.7% (2010 est.)

Inflation rate (consumer prices): 23% (2014 est.)

Labor force: 7 million (2013 est.)

Labor force – by occupation: agriculture 76.9%, industry and services 23.1% (2013 est.)

Unemployment rate: NA%

Budget:
revenues: $1.346 billion (2017 est.)
expenditures: $1.556 billion (2017 est.)

Public Debt 59.3% of GDP (2017 est.)

Industries: tobacco, tea, sugar, sawmill products, cement, consumer goods, cotton, consumer goods, uranium and coal mining

Industrial production growth rate: 2.8% (2013 est.)

Electricity – production: 1.973 billion kWh (2010 est.)

Electricity – consumption: 1.835 billion kWh (2010 est.)

Agriculture – products: tobacco, sugar cane, cotton, tea, maize, potatoes, cassava (tapioca), sorghum, pulses; cattle, goats

Exports: $1.427 billion (2013 est.)

Exports – commodities: tobacco, tea, sugar, cotton, coffee, peanuts, wood products, apparel, uranium and its compounds

Exports – partners: Canada 10.6%, Zimbabwe 9.3%, Germany 7.3%, South Africa 6.6%, Russia 6.5%, US 6.1%, China 4.2% (2012)

Imports: $2.42 billion (2013 est.)

Imports – commodities: food, petroleum products, semimanufactures, consumer goods, transportation equipment

Imports – partners: South Africa 27%, China 16.6%, India 8.7%, Zambia 8.5%, Tanzania 5.1%, US 4.3% (2012)

Current account balance – $280.1 million (2013 est.)

Debt – external: $1.556 billion (31 December 2013 est.)

Economic aid – recipient:

$575.3 million (2005)

Foreign direct investment – inflow $129.5 million (2014)

Currency: 1 Malawian kwacha (MK) = 100 tambala

Exchange rates: Malawian kwachas per US dollar −730.00 (20/June/2016), 460.00 (20/Jan/2015), 360.00 (6/Feb/2013), 165.961 (1/Sep/2011), 145.179 (2009), 135.96 (2006), 108.894 (2005), 108.898 (2004), 97.433 (2003), 76.687 (2002)

Fiscal year: 1 July – 30 June

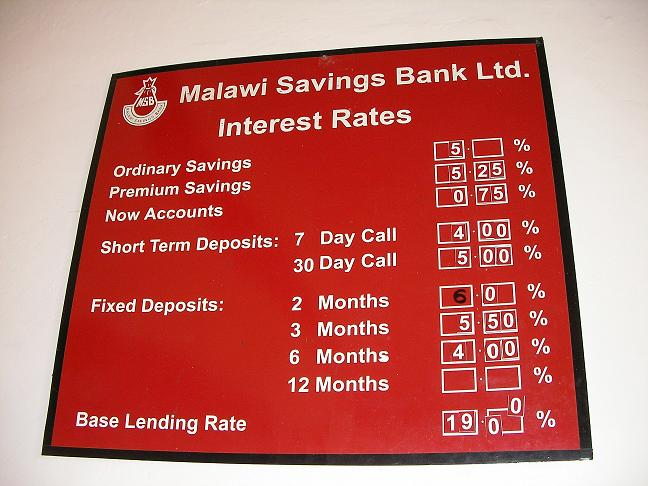
Interest rates advertised by Malawi Savings Bank in Nchalo, Malawi, on 30 September 2008.

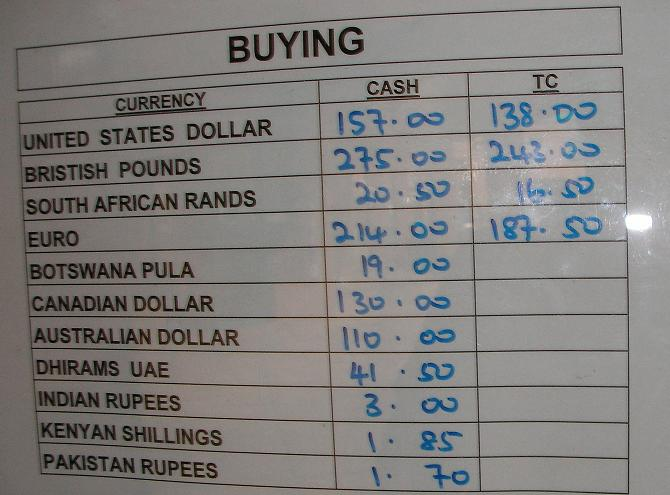
Exchange rates advertised by a currency trader in Lilongwe on 7 October 2008.

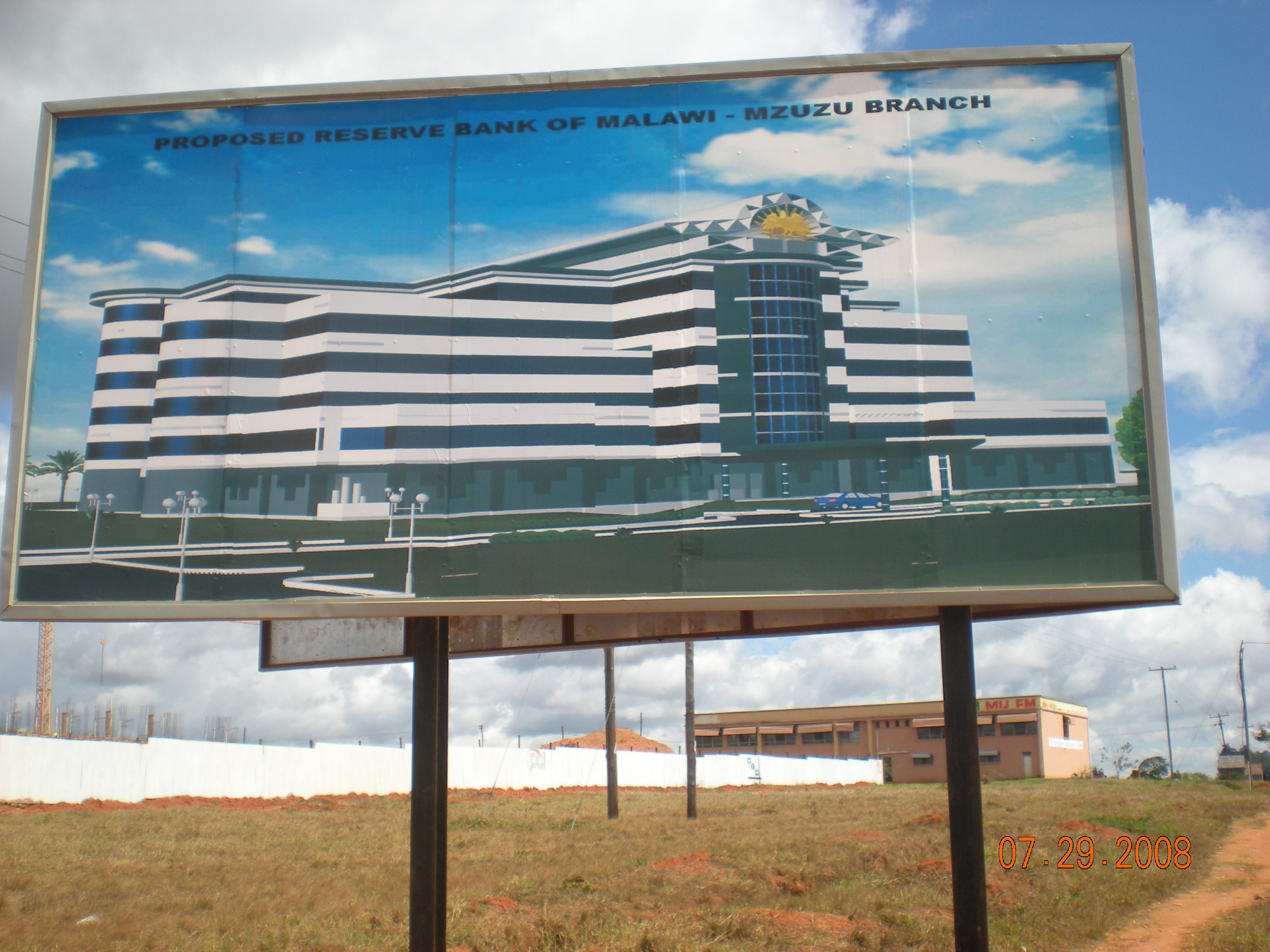
Reserve Bank of Malawi branch under construction in Mzuzu, a fast-growing city, in July 2008.

== See also ==
- Transportation in Malawi
- List of companies based in Malawi
- Science and technology in Malawi
- Economy of Mozambique
- Economy of South Africa
- Economy of Botswana
- Malawi and the International Monetary Fund
- United Nations Economic Commission for Africa
