= Science and technology in Zimbabwe =

This article examines trends and developments in science and technology in Zimbabwe since 2009.

== Socio-economic context ==
GDP in Southern African Development Community countries by economic sector, 2013 or closest year. Source: UNESCO Science Report: towards 2030 (2015)

Between 1998 and 2008, the Zimbabwean economy contracted by a cumulative 50.3%, causing GDP per capita to decline to less than US$400. In July 2008, inflation peaked at 231,000,000%. By this time, 90% of the population was unemployed, and 80% were living in poverty. Infrastructure had deteriorated, the economy had become more informal, and there were severe food and foreign currency shortages. The economic crisis was accompanied by a series of political crises, including a contested election in 2008, which resulted in the formation of a government of national unity in February 2009.

The economic crisis coincided with the implementation of the Fast-track Land Reform Program from 2000 onward, which compounded the decline in agricultural production by reducing the cropping area of traditionally large commercial crops such as wheat and maize. In parallel, FDI shrank after the imposition of economic sanctions and the suspension of IMF technical assistance due to the non-payment of arrears.

Hyperinflation was brought under control in 2009 after the adoption of a Multi-currency payment system and economic recovery program. Once stabilized, the economy grew by 6% in 2009, and foreign direct investment (FDI) in Zimbabwe increased slightly; by 2012, it amounted to US$392 million.

Zimbabwe continues to score poorly on governance indicators. In 2014, it ranked 156th (out of 175) in the Corruption Perceptions Index and 46th (out of 52) in the Ibrahim Index of African Governance. The economy remains unstable.

Following a change in government after elections were held in 2013, the Medium Term Plan 2011–2015 was replaced by the Zimbabwe Agenda for Sustainable Economic Transformation 2013-2018 (Masset ).

The African continent plans to create an African Economic Community by 2028, which would be built on the main regional economic communities, including the Southern African Development Community (SADC), to which Zimbabwe belongs.

== Industrialization ==
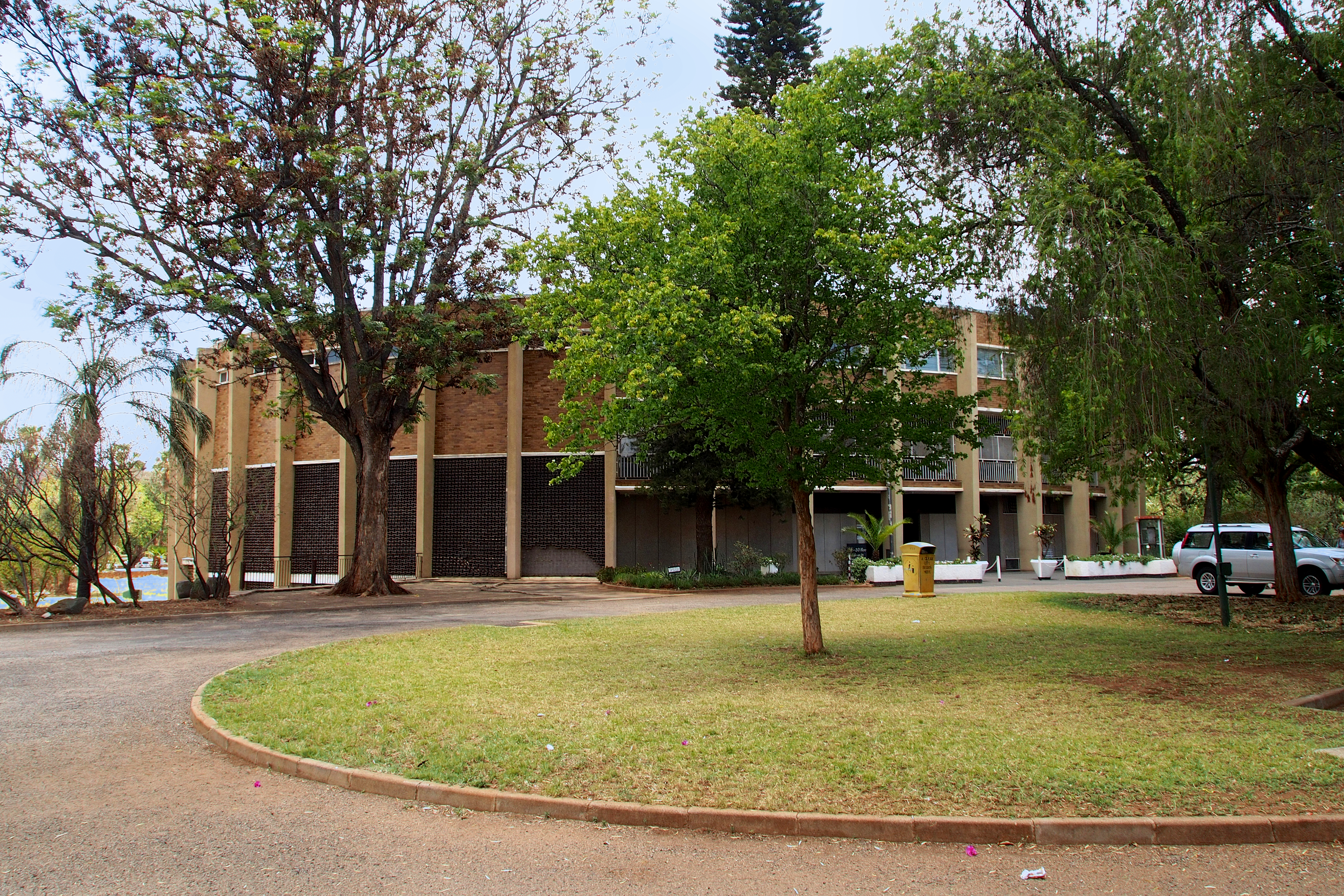
Natural History Museum in Bulawayo

The Zimbabwe Academy of Science (est. 2004) has recognized that the country's industrialization requires a national vision as to which separate materials should be targeted to obtain added value. This vision should be accompanied by the identification of specific technological skills, equipment and infrastructure required by the targeted industrial areas to accompany the process of value addition. Zimbabwe has an agro-based economy, with a growing mining sector: platinum, diamonds, tantalite, silicon, gold, coal, coal-bed, methane, among others. Skills development is needed in these areas to add value but this needs to be supported by matching equipment and appropriate policy instruments.

A poll conducted by the World Economic Forum in 2014 determined that lack of finance was a major impediment to promoting innovation and greater competitiveness in Zimbabwe's productive sector, along with policy instability and inadequate infrastructure. The outcome of this survey is consistent with the findings of a 2013 survey of the manufacturing sector conducted by the Confederation of Zimbabwe Industries.

== Policy environment ==
Zimbabwe has relatively well-developed national infrastructure and a long-standing tradition of promoting research and development (R&D), as evidenced by the levy imposed on tobacco-growers since the 1930s to promote market research.

The country also has a well-developed education system, with one in eleven adults holding a tertiary degree. Given the country's solid knowledge base and abundant natural resources, Zimbabwe has the potential to figure among the countries leading growth in sub-Saharan Africa. Zimbabwe was ranked 129th in the Global Innovation Index in 2025.

To do so, however, Zimbabwe will need to correct a number of structural weaknesses. For instance, it currently lacks the critical mass of researchers and engineers needed to trigger innovation. Although the infrastructure is in place to harness R&D to Zimbabwe's socio-economic development, universities and research institutions lack the requisite financial and human resources to conduct R&D and the current regulatory environment hampers the transfer of new technologies to the business sector.

Nor does the development agenda to 2018, the Zimbabwe Agenda for Sustainable Economic Transformation contains any specific targets for increasing the number of scientists and engineers, or the staffing requirements for industry and other productive sectors. The lack of coordination and coherence among governance structures has also led to a multiplication of research priorities and poor implementation of existing policies.

Zimbabwe is considered as having a fragile national innovation system.

Status of national innovation systems in the Southern Africa Development Community in 2015, in terms of their potential to survive, grow and evolve

Category	Country	Description
Fragile	Democratic Republic of Congo, Lesotho, Madagascar, Swaziland, Zimbabwe	Fragile systems tend to be characterized by political instability, be it from external threats or internal political schisms.
Viable	Angola, Malawi, Mozambique, Namibia, Seychelles, Tanzania, Zambia	Viable systems encompass thriving systems but also faltering ones, albeit in a context of political stability.
Evolving	Botswana, Mauritius, South Africa	In evolving systems, countries are mutating through the effects of policy and their mutation may also affect the emerging regional system of innovation.

Source of table: Mbula-Kraemer, Erika and Scerri, Mario (2015) Southern Africa. In: UNESCO Science Report: towards 2030. UNESCO, Paris, Table 20.5.

=== Second Science and Technology Policy ===
The Second Science and Technology Policy was launched in June 2012, after being elaborated with UNESCO assistance. It replaces the earlier policy dating from 2002 and has six main objectives:

- Strengthen capacity development in STI;
- Learn and utilize emerging technologies to accelerate development;
- Accelerate commercialization of research results;
- Search for scientific solutions to global environmental challenges;
- Mobilize resources and popularize science and technology; and
- Foster international collaboration in STI.

The Second Science and Technology Policy cites sectorial policies with a focus on biotechnology, information and communication technologies (ICTs), space sciences, nanotechnology, indigenous knowledge systems, technologies yet to emerge and scientific solutions to emergent environmental challenges. The policy makes provisions for establishing a National Nanotechnology Programmed.

Zimbabwe has a National Biotechnology Policy which dates from 2005. Despite poor infrastructure and a lack of both human and financial resources, biotechnology research is better established in Zimbabwe than in most sub-Saharan countries, even if it tends to use primarily traditional techniques.

The Second Science and Technology Policy asserts the government commitment to allocating at least 1% of GDP to GERD, focusing at least 60% of university education on developing skills in science and technology and ensuring that school pupils devote at least 30% of their time to studying science subjects.

=== Impact of ZimAsset on research ===
Following the elections of 2013, the incoming government replaced the Medium Term Plan 2011–2015 elaborated by its predecessor with a new development plan, the Zimbabwe Agenda for Sustainable Economic Transformation (ZimAsset, 2013–2018). One objective of ZimAsset is to rehabilitate and upgrade national infrastructure, including the national power grid, road and railway network, water storage and sanitation, buildings and ICT-related infrastructure.

In 2013, the Ministry of Science and Technology Development (dating from 2005) was disbanded and its portfolio relegated to the newly established Department of Science and Technology within the Ministry of Higher and Tertiary Education, Science and Technology Development.

In 2013, the government approved four national research priorities proposed by the Research Council of Zimbabwe:

- The social sciences and humanities;
- Sustainable environmental and resource management;
- Promoting and maintaining good health; and
- The national security of Zimbabwe.

== Financial investment in research ==
In 2009, the Zimbabwean Academy of Sciences estimated gross domestic expenditure on research and development (GERD) to be equivalent to 0.12% GDP. However, the authors of Zimbabwe's National Survey of Research and Development estimated GERD at US$76.3 million just three years later. The Ministry of Finance and Economic Development having estimated GDP at US$10 068 million for the same year, domestic research spending should thus have represented 0.76% of GDP in 2012.

The National Survey of Research and Development (2012) also provided a rough estimate of the share of research spending provided by the government sector (48%), the higher education sector (46%), foreign sources (3%), private non-profit organizations (2%) and the business enterprise sector (1%).

As a signatory and Party to the SADC Protocol on Science, Technology and Innovation (2008) since 2018, Zimbabwe had committed to raising GERD to at least 1% of GDP by 2020. This was an ambitious target, given that a national African Science, Technology and Innovation Indicators Survey concluded in 2015 that Zimbabwe’s GERD amounted to less than 0.001% of GDP.

== Researchers ==
Zimbabwe has a long research tradition dating back a century. However, the economic crisis has precipitated an exodus of university students and professionals in key areas of expertise (medicine, engineering, etc.) that is of growing concern. More than 22% of Zimbabwean tertiary students were completing their degrees abroad in 2012, compared to a 4% average for sub-Saharan Africa as a whole.

In 2012, there were 200 researchers (head count) employed in the public sector, one-quarter of whom were women. This is double the continental average (91 in 2013) but only one-quarter the researcher density of South Africa (818 per million inhabitants).

The government has created the Zimbabwe Human Capital Website to provide information for the diaspora on job and investment opportunities in Zimbabwe.

Despite the fact that human resources are a pillar of any research and innovation policy, the Medium Term Plan 2011–2015 did not discuss any explicit policy for promoting postgraduate studies in science and engineering. The scarcity of new PhDs in science and engineering fields from the University of Zimbabwe in 2013 was symptomatic of this omission.

Likewise, the Zimbabwe Agenda for Sustainable Economic Transformation contains no specific targets for increasing the number of scientists and engineers.

=== Academic teaching and research ===
Public expenditure on education in Southern Africa as a share of GDP, 2012 or closest year. Source: UNESCO Science Report: towards 2030 (2015)

Despite the turbulence of recent years, Zimbabwe's education sector remains sound. In 2012, 91% of young adult and teens aged 15–24 years were literate, 53% of the population aged 25 years or more had completed secondary education and 3% of adults held a tertiary qualification. The government is planning to establish two new universities with a focus on agricultural science and technology: Marondera and Manicaland State Universities.

Zimbabwe's investment in education was among the lowest in Southern Africa in 2010, 2% of GDP. However, 40% of this (0.4% of GDP) went on higher education.

== Linkages between academia and industry ==
Public–private linkages remain weak. With the exception of the long-standing tobacco industry and agricultural sector, there has traditionally been little collaboration between industry and academia in Zimbabwe. In 2014, the regulatory framework was hampering the transfer of technology to the business sector and the development of industrial R&D, despite the commercialization of research results being one of the major goals of the Second Science, Technology and Innovation Policy.

Scientific research output in terms of publications in Southern Africa, cumulative totals by field, 2008–2014. Source: UNESCO Science Report: towards 2030 (2015), Figure 20.6

The government has been analyzing new legislation that would promote local cutting and polishing of diamonds to create an estimated 1,700 new jobs. It has already slashed license fees for local cutting and polishing firms. Mining accounts for 15% of GDP and generates about US$1.7 billion in exports annually. Despite this, the government receives royalties of only US$200 million. In 2014, the entire stock of diamonds was being exported in raw form. The new legislation will require companies to pay a 15% value-added tax but they will incur a 50% discount if they decide to sell their diamonds to the Minerals Marketing Corporation of Zimbabwe.

== Trends in scientific output ==
Productivity is fairly low but the number of publications has grown. According to Thomson Reuters' Web of Science (Science Citation Index Expanded), scientific output rose from 173 articles in 2005 to 310 in 2014. The long-standing University of Zimbabwe is particularly active in research, producing more than 44% of Zimbabwe's scientific publications in 2013. I

Scientific publication trends in the most productive SADC countries, 2005-2014. Source: UNESCO Science Report: towards 2030 (2015), data from Thomson Reuters' Web of Science, Science Citation Index Expanded

In 2014, Zimbabwe counted 21 publications per million inhabitants in internationally cataloged journals, according to Thomson Reuters' Web of Science (Science Citation Index Expanded). This placed Zimbabwe sixth out of the 15 SADC countries, behind Namibia (59), Mauritius (71), Botswana (103) and, above all, South Africa (175) and the Seychelles (364). The average for sub-Saharan Africa was 20 scientific publications per million inhabitants, compared to a global average of 176 per million.

The past decade has seen a steep rise in the number of co-publications with foreign partners. These represented 75–80% of all Zimbabwean publications in the Web of Science over 2008-2014. Zimbabwean scientists co-authored articles mostly with South Africans over this period, followed by Americans, British, Dutch and Ugandan scientists

== Regional policy framework for science and technology ==
The SADC Protocol on Science, Technology and Innovation was adopted in 2008. Zimbabwe is not one of the four countries which had ratified this protocol by 2015, namely Botswana, Mauritius, Mozambique and South Africa. Ten of the 15 SADC countries must ratify the protocol for it to enter into force. The protocol promotes legal and political co-operation. It stresses the importance of science and technology for achieving 'sustainable and equitable socio-economic growth and poverty eradication'.

Scientific publications per million inhabitants in SADC countries in 2014. Source: UNESCO Science Report (2015), data from Thomson Reuters' Web of Science, Science Citation Index Expanded

Two primary policy documents operationalize the SADC Treaty (1992), the Regional Indicative Strategic Development Plan for 2005–2020, adopted in 2003, and the Strategic Indicative Plan for the Organ (2004). The Regional Indicative Strategic Development Plan for 2005–2020 identifies the region's 12 priority areas for both sectorial and cross-cutting intervention, mapping out goals and setting up concrete targets for each. The four sectoral areas are: trade and economic liberalization, infrastructure, sustainable food security and human and

social development. The eight cross-cutting areas are:

- poverty;
- combating the HIV/AIDS pandemic;
- gender equality;
- science and technology;
- information and communication technologies (ICTs);
- environment and sustainable development;
- private sector development; and
- statistics.

Targets include:

- ensuring that 50% of decision-making positions in the public sector are held by women by 2015;
- raising gross domestic expenditure on research and development (GERD) to at least 1% of GDP by 2015;
- increasing intra-regional trade to at least 35% of total SADC trade by 2008 (10% in 2008);
- increasing the share of manufacturing to 25% of GDP by 2015; and
- achieving 100% connectivity to the regional power grid for all member states by 2012.

A 2013 mid-term review of the Regional Indicative Strategic Development Plan for 2005–2020 noted that limited progress had been made towards STI targets, owing to the lack of human and financial resources at the SADC Secretariat to co-ordinate STI programs. Meeting in Maputo, Mozambique, in June 2014, SADC ministers of science, technology and innovation, education and training adopted the SADC Regional Strategic Plan on Science, Technology and Innovation for 2015–2020 to guide implementation of regional programs.

Concerning sustainable development, in 1999, the SADC adopted a protocol governing wildlife, forestry, shared water courses and the environment, including climate change, the SADC Protocol on Wildlife Conservation and Law Enforcement (1999). More recently, SADC has initiated a number of regional and national initiatives to mitigate the impact of climate change. In 2013, ministers responsible for the environment and natural resources approved the development of the SADC Regional Climate Change program. In addition, COMESA, the East African Community and SADC have been implementing a joint five-year initiative since 2010 known as the Tripartite Programme on Climate Change Adaptation and Mitigation, or The African Solution to Address Climate Change.

== See also ==
- Science and technology in Botswana
- Science and technology in Malawi
- Science and technology in Tanzania
- Science and technology in Uganda

== Sources ==
This article incorporates text from a free content work. Licensed under CC-BY-SA IGO3.0. Text taken from UNESCO Science Report: towards 2030, UNESCO.

- This article incorporates text from a free content work. Licensed under C-BY-SA 3.0 IGO. Text taken from UNESCO Science Report: the Race Against Time for Smarter Development., Schneegans, S., T. Straza and J. Lewis (eds), UNESCO.
