= Cotton in Malawi =

Cotton in Malawi is an important part of the agricultural history of Malawi. Cotton is not indigenous to the country, but was introduced into warmer lowland areas no later than the 17th century. Production in the late pre-colonial and early colonial period was limited but, from the early 20th century, it has been grown mainly by African smallholders in the south of the country. For a brief period during the First World War, cotton was the most valuable export crop, and it has remained an important earner of foreign exchange.

Throughout most of the colonial period and since independence, smallholder cotton growers have been subject to market regulation which prevented competition with estates owned by Europeans in the earlier period and by members of the Malawian political elite later. Regulations transferred resources away from smallholder cotton farmers and, where the rewards were meager, probably discouraged them from abandoning subsistence food cultivation, as there is the potential to grow much more cotton than is currently being produced.

== Pre-colonial period ==
In pre-colonial Malawi, cotton was grown in the Shire valley in the south from the 17th century, including a local variety called “Tonje Kadja” in the local Mang’anja language and an imported variety, “Tonje Manga”, which produced more cotton of better quality. Smaller quantities were grown in the Mchinji and Kasungu districts of Central Malawi and at the northern end of Lake Malawi. However, in most of the country, the climate was unsuitable for cotton growing, although cotton cloth was imported as a luxury item. Cotton growing in the Shire valley was disrupted by famine and local warfare in the 1860s but partly resumed, at least in the Lower Shire, in the next decade, although by the 1890s, the importation of cotton cloth produced in Europe had stifled local production.

== Colonial Nyasaland to 1934 ==
After a rapid rise from virtually nothing before 1908, cotton production for the whole protectorate was around 1,000 short tons a season in the years 1911/12 to 1917/18, but declined steeply until 1924. From 1925 to 1930, it rose from 2,909 short tons, although there was another slump in the early 1930s. Before the 1950s, almost all the saleable cotton crop was exported, and cotton accounted for 12% of the value of Nyasaland's exports in 1908 rising to 44% in 1917. However, in 1922 it had declined to 16%, in third place behind tobacco and tea exports. From 1925 to 1936, on average 80% of production was from the Lower Shire districts of Nsanje and Chikwawa, but production there later declined as parts of the area became permanently inundated.

=== Estate production ===
The history of colonial cotton production is divisible between its relatively unsuccessful introduction onto European-owned estates and more successful cultivation by Africans on their own land. In both cases, the initiative came from the British Cotton Growing Association (BCGA), a Lancashire-based manufacturers’ organisation that stimulated cotton production in the British Empire, initially by making cash advances to European settlers, but later by providing suitable cotton seed to be distributed to African farmers.

At first, European plantation agriculture was focused on the Shire Highlands and agriculture there first concentrated on coffee. An attempt in 1903 to grow Egyptian cotton there was unsuccessful, as it was more suitable for hotter areas, but from 1906, William Jervis Livingstone developed a hardier variety of Upland cotton, which he called Nyasaland Upland. Estate production rose significantly between 1908 and 1914. However, in the latter year, the BCGA ended its policy of making loans or advances, and many of the estates turned from growing cotton to tobacco. By 1930, almost no cotton in Nyasaland was grown on European estates.

Estate-grown cotton required intensive labour over its five or six month growing season and, to ensure that sufficient workers were available throughout this period, many estates, notably A L Bruce Estates and the African Lakes Corporation, exploited Mozambican immigrants who had no right to farm land collectively held by the local African people. These migrant workers were given labour tenancies under a system called thangata, which obliged them to work for several months without wages on estate land in lieu of rent for a plot the tenant could use for their own crops. As labour was required mainly in the rainy season, this left tenants little time to grow their food crops.

=== Smallholder production ===
From 1903, the BCGA provided limited amounts of Egyptian cotton seed to African farmers in the Upper Shire valley, but in 1905 the Association sent an expert to Nyasaland, who advocated wider seed distribution, building ginneries and providing markets in lowland areas suitable for growing Egyptian cotton by African farmers, although until 1914they were discouraged from growing cotton in upland areas where it might compete with the estates. In 1910, the BCGA built a ginnery and agreed to purchase part of the cotton crop. Production by Africans flourished along the Shire valley, where river and later rail transport was available, but it was often abandoned in areas were transport costs were high.

Disastrous floods in the Lower Shire in 1918 severely hit production there, and a post-war slump in cotton prices convinced many African farmers outside the Lower Shire valley to cease growing cotton. However, after 1924, production by African growers in the Lower Shire revived.

The expansion of cash crop production among the African smallholders in Nyasaland was followed by market regulation, as the Nyasaland government was concerned too few Africans would be available to work on European estates. Production in marginal areas was also discouraged by the colonial administration's 1910 Cotton Ordinance, which limited those who could issue seed to or purchase cotton from these farmers. After a boom in sales during the First World War ended, the BGCA ceased operations in several areas, generally those where transport was difficult. However, its position as preferred buyer was strengthened in 1923 and would have created a virtual monopoly for the Association, had it been possible to control the activities of middlemen. The BGCA remained the main buyer until 1931, when it ended its purchasing because of the losses it incurred. Middlemen were only brought under control after the Great Depression when prices began to stabilise and the 1934 Cotton Ordinance introduced and enforced tougher restrictions on them

== Colonial Nyasaland from 1935 ==
By 1936, the Colonial Office considered that, except for tea, European agriculture in Nyasaland had failed in economic terms and that indigenous farmers would be the producers of the future. This was particularly true of cotton, as most was grown on land belonging to African communities rather than by estate owners or their tenants.

Cotton production recovered from a recession in the early 1930s, and reached a peak of 9,737 short tons in 1935, remaining high until 1938, but collapsing in 1939 with the outbreak of the Second World War. Proportionally less cotton was produced in the Lower Shire, as much of the rich alluvial lands were inundated by rising river levels and land further from the river lost fertility through repeated crops being taken with little or no fertilizer applied. However, in 1935, the Zambezi Bridge was constructed, creating an uninterrupted rail link from Blantyre to the sea at Beira, and in the same year a northern railway extension to Lake Nyasa was completed, where a terminal for lake steamer services was developed. This reduced transport costs for cotton growers around the lake and promoted its cultivation there. However, cotton's relative importance as an export declined to 10% in 1941 and 7% in 1951. Between 1951 and 1960, the value of cotton exports averaged only 5% of the protectorate's total exports, and from 1954 it ranked in fourth place behind groundnuts. Exports had fallen from an average of 3,000 short tons to only 1,300 short tons in 1960, although more cotton was being used domestically.

Between 1931 and 1939, there was no monopolistic cotton buyer. However, the outbreak of the Second World War disrupted normal trading channels, and the colonial government adopted powers to purchase goods considered essential for the war effort at controlled prices. Although cotton production had been started to supply Lancashire's mills, from 1935 there was a drop in the proportion of cotton sent to Britain, which accelerated after 1939. During the war, most cotton was exported to South Africa, Australia and India, but by 1951, 80% was being sent to Britain.

Government controls were continued after the war, and a Cotton Board was formed in 1951, which was amalgamated in 1955 with two other produce boards to form the Agricultural Production and Marketing Board. With the withdrawal of the estates from cotton growing, their demands for labour and objections to smallholder competition became less important to the colonial government than its using the marketing boards as a source of revenue by paying low prices to African producers. However, government policies in the 1950s favoured the development of smallholder agriculture in general and, from the middle of that decade until the early 1970s, both under colonial rule and after independence, African smallholders enjoyed more freedom from onerous controls than before or since.

== Post-independence from 1963 ==
Total cotton production in 1963 was 4,800 short tons, and it remained at that level for the rest of the decade, then rose steadily to around 7,200 short tons in the 1970s and 10,600 tons in 1984. After that date, annual production fluctuated for almost a decade but then rose to a peak of 23,760 short tons in 1995, before falling back to around 11,000 short tons up to 2002. From 2003, the trend was generally upward until 2014, with peaks of 23,760 short tons in 1995 31,200, short tons in 2007 and 43,200 short tons in 2013, although it later declined to 30,000 metric tonnes (33,070 short tons) in 2017. Cotton has ranked as Malawi's fourth export by value after tobacco, tea and sugar since independence, and it is still generally grown by smallholder farmers, whose number as registered growers was almost 97,000 in 1993 and almost 217,000 in 2005. Although the trend in producer numbers and, to a lesser extent, areas planted were upward, there were significant annual variations, and it is estimated production could be doubled if cotton were grown in all suitable areas. The overall increase in cotton production was largely related to an increase in yields as more fertilizer was used.

In Malawi in 1989, the average cotton-grower's smallholding was 1.28 hectares, of which about half was used to grow cotton and the rest for food crops. In terms of purchasing power, producer prices rose gradually from 1963 to 1980, then stagnated until dropping back to their 1975 level in 1985, although this was partly offset by higher yields. Since a low point in 1993, producer prices grew steadily until 2009, then began to fluctuate greatly from year to year, being almost twice as high in 2012 as in 2013, when production was much higher.

Between independence in 1963 and 1972, the Malawi government actively supported the smallholder farming sector, as few European-owned estates remained. However, its disappointment with smallholder production brought about a change in government policy, which involved transferring land used by smallholders to the estate sector. Most of these new estates were medium-sized farms, not on the scale of former European-owned estates, leased on 99-year agricultural leases to senior officials and politicians of the ruling Malawi Congress Party: most attempts in the 1970s and 1980s to grow cotton on larger commercial farms failed, just as similar attempts on European estates had failed earlier.

The colonial-era Agricultural Production and Marketing Board was replaced by a Farmers Marketing Board (FMB) in 1962, which included growers’ representatives as members. The FMB was given wide powers to buy, sell and process farm products, to promote price stability and to distribute subsidised seed and fertilizer sales: until 1969 it operated on a not-for-profit basis. After that date the FMB and from 1972 its successor, the Agricultural Development and Marketing Corporation (ADMARC) operated a policy of underpaying smallholders and transferring resources away from them to the state and to the elite owning the newly created estates.

After food shortages in 1992 and the end of one-party rule in 1994, ADMARC was reformed and acted as the main provider for smallholders of fertilizer and seed at subsidised prices, and of local markets to sell their crops in at standard prices, as few private traders emerged. After further efforts to promote private trading, three large private companies and a few smaller ones entered the cotton-buying market, but these colluded to keep prices low. Most cotton was still exported, as the domestic clothing industry was very small. Liberalisation of Malawi's agricultural sector and the attempt to reduce ADMARC's influence after 2006 largely failed and by 2010, most cotton markets were again operated by ADMARC. This organisation is under the control of politicians, and this has led to perception that it does not act in the best interests of smallholders

== Sources ==
- J. A. Byfield, (2015). Producing for the War, in J. A. Byfield, C. Brown, T. Parsons and A Sikainga (editors) Africa and World War II. Cambridge University Press. ISBN 978-1-10763-022-2.
- C. A. Baker, (1962) Nyasaland, the History of its Export Trade. The Nyasaland Journal, Vol. 15, No.1, pp. 7–35.
- B Chinsinga, (2011). Agro-dealers, Subsidies and Rural Market Development in Malawi: A Political Economy Enquiry, Future Agricultures Working Paper 031.
- E. Green, (2002). “Kudzitetaza ku njala” - the Liberalisation of the Agricultural Markets and its Impact on the Smallholder Farmers: the Case of Malawi. Lund University, Department of Economic History.
- E. Green, (2007). Modern Agricultural History in Malawi: Perspectives on Policy-Choice Explanations, African Studies Review, Vol. 50, No. 3. pp. 115–133.
- E. Kagabhe, (2015). Analysis of Malawi's Cotton Trade 1991–2013. Economics Association of Malawi ECMA Research Symposium 2015.
- U Lele, N. van de Walle and M. Gbetibouo, (1989.) Cotton in Africa: Analysis of Differences in Performance, MADIA Discussion Paper No.7. Washington, the World Bank.
- J. McCracken, (2012). A History of Malawi, 1859-1966 Woodbridge, James Currey. ISBN 978-1-84701-050-6.
- G. Khombe, (2017). Cotton Production at Lowest Level. Cotton Council of Malawi press release.
- Malawi National Statistics Office, (2013). Cotton Production in Malawi. Lilongwe, Government Press.
- Malawi Department of Agriculture, (2006). Trade Statistics Report 2013. Zomba, National Statistics Office.
- E. C. Mandala, (1982). Peasant Cotton Agriculture, Gender and Inter-Generational Relationships: The LowerTchiri (Shire) Valley of Malawi, 1906–1940. African Studies Review, Vol. 25, No. 2/3, pp. 27–44.
- E. C. Mandala, (2005). The End of Chidyerano: A History of Food and Everyday Life in Malawi, 1860–2004. ISBN 978-0-32507-021-6.
- C. Ng'ong'ola, (1986), Malawi's Agricultural Economy and the Evolution of Legislation on the Production and Marketing of Peasant Economic Crops, Journal of Southern African Studies, Vol. 12, No. 2, pp. 240–62.
- S. Onyeiwu, (2000). Deceived by African Cotton: The British Cotton Growing Association and the Demise of the Lancashire Textile Industry. African Economic History, No. 28, pp. 89–121.
- J. Perry (1969). The growth of the transport network of Malawi- The Society of Malawi Journal, 1969 Vol. 22, No. 2, pp. 23–37.
- P. T. Terry, (1962). The Rise of the African Cotton Industry in Nyasaland], 1902 to 1918. The Nyasaland Journal, Vol. 15, No. 1, pp 59–71.
- L. White, (1987). Magomero: Portrait of an African Village, Cambridge University Press.

ISBN 0-521-32182-4
