= Malawi and the International Monetary Fund =

The International Monetary Fund (IMF) has operated in Malawi since 1965.

== History ==
Malawi joined the International Monetary Fund on July 19, 1965. Malawi has since concluded 13 arrangements (loans) with the fund. The first came on October 31, 1979 and the thirteenth on July 23, 2012. Among the 661,749 Special Drawing Rights agreed on these 13 loans, Malawi has drawn 493,679 SDRs, of which 149,741 SDRs are still pending. Malawi's quota amounts to 138.8 million Special Drawing Rights.

=== Constituency ===
Malawi belongs to Africa Group 1, the IMF's largest constituency, along with 22 other nations. The constituency as a whole yields 2.97 percent of the collective voting power within the fund and is egalitarian, unlike other large constituencies, As of 2017 Maxwell M. Mkwezalamba, Malawi's former Minister of Finance, serves as the constituency's Executive Director, a position that rotates among members.

=== Arrangements ===
On July 23, 2012, the IMF's Extended Credit Facility (ECF) approved a loan of 138,800 SDRs, of which Malawi has drawn 119.3 million. Malawi sought financial assistance from Fund, because the nation was facing a budget crisis. In July 2012, the ECF issued a loan of $156 million to prevent the depletion of the country's international reserves. Goals of the fund's intervention included reducing inflation, increasing foreign-exchange reserves, and enhancing financial services to improve the nation's balance of payments and encourage foreign investment. As a result of a drought caused by El Niño weather patterns, the Fund approved a 49.2 million dollar disbursement. Because of a reduction in maize production by about 12%, intervention was necessary to prevent maize price inflation. The United Nations World Food Programme estimated that the reduction in the production of maize and other crops has left over 6.5 million Malawians susceptible to food insecurity. The IMF approved this additional disbursement in order to alleviate the food shortage.

=== Heavily Indebted Poor Countries ===
Founded by the IMF and the World Bank in 1996, the Heavily Indebted Poor Countries organisation (HIPC) extended debt forgiveness to the world's most indebted nations. Among those 36 countries who met the requirements of this initiative include Malawi, Afghanistan and Haiti. Malawi was the 20th country to be approved as a participant in the initiative, and once approved, Malawi became eligible for further debt relief from the World Banks IDA, the IMF and the African Development Fund (AfDF) under the Multilateral Debt Relief Initiative (MDRI)."
