= Bibliography of science and technology in Canada =

This is a bibliography on the history of science and technology in Canada mainly compiled in 2011 from the Canadiana : the national bibliography with very few additions since then.

== Overviews ==
- G. Bruce Doern; Peter W. B. Phillips; David Castle (2016). Canadian Science, Technology, and Innovation Policy: The Innovation Economy and Society Nexus. McGill-Queen's University Press. ISBN 978-0-7735-4724-7.
- Edward Jones-Imhotep; Tina Adcock (2018). Made Modern: Science and Technology in Canadian History. UBC Press. ISBN 978-0-7748-3726-2.
- Council of Canadian Academies (2012). The State of Science and Technology in Canada, 2012. Council of Canadian Academies. ISBN 978-1-926558-47-9.

== Nuclear issues ==
- Atomic Energy Canada Limited (1997), Canada enters the nuclear age, McGill-Queen's University Press, ISBN 0-7735-1601-8
- Buckley, Brian (2000). Canada's early nuclear policy: fate, chance and character. McGill-Queen's Press - MQUP. ISBN 978-0-7735-2077-6.
- Clearwater, John (1998), Canadian nuclear weapons: the untold story of Canada's Cold War arsenal, Dundurn Press Ltd., ISBN 978-1-55002-299-5
- Doern, G. Bruce; Robert W. Morrison; Arslan Dorman (2001). Canadian nuclear energy policy: changing ideas, institutions, and interests. University of Toronto Press. ISBN 978-0-8020-4788-5.
- Eggleston, Wilfred, Canada's Nuclear Story *Toronto: Clarke Irwin, 1965)
- Richter, Andrew (2002), Avoiding Armageddon: Canadian military strategy and nuclear weapons, 1950-63, UBC Press, ISBN 978-0-7748-0888-0
- Steed, Roger G (2007), Nuclear Power in Canada and Beyond, General Store Pub. House, ISBN 978-1-897113-51-6

== Technological and industrial ==
- Avery, Donald H., The Science of War: Canadian Scientists and Allied Military Technology During the Second World War, University of Toronto Press, Toronto, 1998.
- Babaian, Sharon, Radio Communication in Canada: A Historical and Technological Survey, Transformation Series 1, National Museum of Science and Technology, Ottawa, 1992.
- Ball, Norman R., Mind, Heart, and Vision: Professional Engineering in Canada 1887 to 1987, National Museum of Science and Technology/Museums of Canada, Ottawa, 1987.
- Ball, Norman R. ed., Building Canada: A History of Public Works, University of Toronto Press, Toronto, 1988.
- Barris, Theodore (26 September 2015). Fire Canoe: Prairie Steamboat Days Revisited. Dundurn Press 2015. ISBN 9781459732100.
- Berger, Carl, Science, God, and Nature in Victorian Canada, University of Toronto Press, Toronto, 1983.
- Bliss, Michael, Northern Enterprise: Five Centuries of Canadian Business, McClelland and Stewart, Toronto, 1987.
- Bothwell, Robert, Nucleus: The History of Atomic Energy of Canada Limited, University of Toronto Press, Toronto, 1988.
- Brown, J.J., Ideas in Exile, McClelland and Stewart, Toronto, 1967.
- Bryden, John, Deadly Allies: Canada's Secret War 1937–1947, McClelland & Stewart, Toronto, 1989.
- Chisholm, Barbara, ed., Castles of the North: Canada's Grand Hotels, Lynx Images Inc., Toronto, 2001.
- Collins, Robert, A Voice from Afar: The History of Telecommunications in Canada, McGraw-Hill Ryerson, 1977.
- Dewalt, Bryan, Building a Digital Network in Canada: Data Communications and Digital Telephony, 1959–1990, Transformation Series 2, National Museum of Science and Technology, Ottawa, 1992.
- Dewalt, Bryan, Technology and Canadian Printing: A History from Lead Type to Lasers, Transformation Series 3, National Museum of Science and Technology, Ottawa, 1995.
- Eggleston, Wilfred, National Research in Canada: The NRC 1916–1966, Clarke Irwin, Toronto, 1978.
- Faucher, Philippe, Grands projets et innovations technologiques au Canada, Les presses de l'universite de Montréal, Montreal, 1999.
- Germain, Georges-Hebert, Le Genie Québécois: Histoire d'une conquete, Ordre des ingenieurs du Québec/Libre Expression, Montreal, 1995.
- Guillet, Edwin C., The Story of Canadian Roads, University of Toronto Press, Toronto, 1967.
- Harry, J., Smith, G., Lessard, Gilles, Forestry Resources Research in Canada, Science Council of Canada, Ottawa 1971.
- Hopps, John A., Passing Pulses: The Pacemaker and Medical Engineering: A Canadian Story, Publishing Plus Limited, Ottawa, 1995.
- Knowles Middleton, W.E., Radar Development in Canada: The Radio Branch of the National Research Council of Canada, 1939–1946, Wilfrid Laurier University Press, Waterloo, Ontario, 1981.
- Koppel, Ted, Powering the Future: the Ballard Fuel Cell and the Race to Change the World, John Wiley & Sons, Etobicoke, 1999.
- Lowther, William, Arms and the Man: Dr. Gerald Bull, Iraq and the Supergun, Doubleday Canada Limites, Toronto, 1991.
- MacDermot, H.E., One Hundred Years of Medicine in Canada 1867–1967, McClelland and Stewart, Toronto, 1967.
- Macpherson, Burgess, The Ships of Canada's Naval Forces 1910–1985, Collins, Toronto, 1981.
- McDonnell, The History of Canadian Railroads, New Burlington Books, London, 1985.
- McGrath, T.M., History of Canadian Airports, Lugus Publications, Ottawa, 1992.
- Madger, Ted, Canada's Hollywood: The Canadian State and Feature Films, University of Toronto Press, Toronto, 1993.
- Maginley, Collin, The Ships of Canada's Marine Services, Vanwell, St. Catharines, 2001.
- Mayer, Roy, Inventing Canada: One Hundred Years of Innovation, Raincoast Books, Vancouver, 1997.
- Mayer, Roy, Scientific Canadian: Invention and Innovation from Canada's national Research Council, Raincoast Books, Vancouver, 1999.
- Milberry, Larry, Aviation in Canada, McGraw-Hill Ryerson, Toronto, 1979.
- Millard, J. Rodney, The Master Spirit of the Age: Canadian Engineers and the Politics of Professionalism 1887–1922, University of Toronto Press, Toronto, 1988.
- Morton, Desmond, A Military History of Canada, Hurtig, Edmonton, 1990.
- Mouat, Jeremy, Metal Mining in Canada, 1840 −1950, Transformation Series 9, National Museum of Science and Technology, Ottawa, 2000.
- Muise, McIntosh, Coal Mining in Canada: A Historical and Comparative Overview, Transformation Series 5, National Museum of Science and Technology, Ottawa, 1996.
- Robertson, Heather, Driving Force, The McLaughlin Family and the Age of the Car, McClelland & Stewart, Toronto, 1995.
- Silversides, C.Ross, Broadaxe to Flying Shear: the Mechanization of Forest Harvesting East of the Rockies, Transformation Series 6, National Museum of Science and Technology, Ottawa, 1997.
- Smallman, B.N., et al., Agriculture Science in Canada, Science Council of Canada, Ottawa, 1970.
- Stewart, R.W., Dickie, L.M., Ad Mare: Canada Looks to the Sea—A Study on Marine Science and Technology, Science Council of Canada, Ottawa 1971.
- Süsskind, Charles. "technology." Grolier Multimedia Encyclopedia. 2008. Grolier Online. 23 Oct. 2008
- Taylor, Baskerville, A Concise Business History of Canada, Oxford University Press, Toronto, 1994.
- Thomson, Don W., Men and Mericians Volumes 1,2,3, Information Canada, Ottawa, 1966.
- Thomson, Malcolm, M., The Beginning of the Long Dash: A History of Timekeeping in Canada, University of Toronto Press, Toronto, 1978.
- Tremblay, Robert, Histoire des outils manuels au Canada de 1828 a 1960, Transformation Series 10, National Museum of Science and Technology, Ottawa, 2001.
- Warrington, Newbold, Chemical Canada: Past and Present, The Chemical Institute of Canada, Ottawa, 1970.
- Weir, E. Austin, The Struggle for National Broadcasting in Canada, McClelland & Stewart, Toronto, 1965.
- Westman, A.E.R., Chemistry and Chemical Engineering: A Survey of Research and Development in Canada, The Science Council of Canada, Ottawa, 1969.
- Wilson, Andrew, Background to Invention, Science Council of Canada, 1970.
- Wilson, Andrew, Research Councils in the Provinces: A Canadian Resource, Science Council of Canada, Ottawa, 1971.
- Wilson, Garth, A History of Shipbuilding and Naval Architecture in Canada, Transformation Series 4, National Museum of Science and Technology, Ottawa, 1994.
- Williams, Michael, Massey Ferguson Tractors, Blandford Press, London, 1987.
- Wright, J.W., A History of the Native Peoples of Canada: Volumes I(2001) & II(1999), Canadian Museum of Civilization, Ottawa.
- Zeller, Suzanne, Inventing Canada: Early Victorian Science and the Idea of a Transcontinental Nation, University of Toronto Press, Toronto, 1987.
- Scientia Canadensis

== Natural scientific research ==
- Ainley, Marianne Gosztonyi, ed., Despite All Odds: Essays on Canadian Women and Science, Vehicle Press, Montreal, 1990.
- Anstey, T.H., One Hundred Harvests: Research Branch Agriculture Canada 1886–1986, Research Branch Agriculture Canada, Historical Series No. 27, 1986.
- Appley, M.H., Rickwood, Jean, Psychology in Canada, Science Secretariat, Ottawa, 1967.
- Avery, Donald H., The Science of War: Canadian Scientists and Allied Military Technology During the Second World War, University of Toronto Press, Toronto, 1998.
- Babbitt, J.D. ed., Science in Canada: Selections from the Speeches of Dr. E.W.R. Steacie, University of Toronto Press, Toronto, 1965.
- Beltzner, Klaus P., Coleman, A. John, Edwards, Gordon G., Mathematical Sciences in Canada, Science Council of Canada, ottawa, 1976.
- Berger, Carl, Science, God, and Nature in Victorian Canada, University of Toronto Press, Toronto, 1983.
- Berger, Carl, Honour and the Search for Influence: A History of the Royal Society of Canada, University of Toronto Press, Toronto, 1996.
- Bliss, Michael, Northern Enterprise: Five Centuries of Canadian Business, McClelland and Stewart, Toronto, 1987.
- Bothwell, Robert, Nucleus: The History of Atomic Energy of Canada Limited, University of Toronto Press, Toronto, 1988.
- Bryden, John, Best-Kept Secret: Canadian Secret Intelligence in the Second World War, Lester Publishing, Toronto, 1993.
- Bryden, John, Deadly Allies: Canada's Secret War 1937–1947, McClelland & stewart, Toronto, 1989.
- Chapman, J.H., et al., Upper Atmosphere and Space Programmes in Canada, Science Secretariat, Ottawa, 1967.
- Chartrand, Duchesne, Gingras, Histoire des sciences au Québec, Boreal, Montreal, 1987.
- Doern, G. Bruce, Science and Politics in Canada, McGill-Queen's University Press, Toronto, 1972.
- Duchesne, R., La science et le pouvoir au Québec, Editeur officiel du Québec, Quebec, 1978.
- Eggleston, Wilfred, National Research in Canada: The NRC 1916–1966, Clarke Irwin, Toronto, 1978.
- Edmonds, Alan, Voyage to the Edge of the World, McClelland and Stewart, Toronto, 1973.
- Fillmore, Peter ed., Canadian Mathematical Society 1945–1995: Volume I—Mathematics in Canada, Canadian Mathematical Society, Ottawa, 1995.
- Gingras, Yves, Les origines de la recherche scientifique au Canada: Le cas des physiciens, Boreal, Montreal, 1991.
- Gingras, Yves, Pour l'avancement des sciences, Histoire de l'ACFAS 1923–1993, Boreal, Montreal, 1994.
- Gillmor, Don, I Swear By Apollo: Dr Ewen Cameron and the CIA-Brainwashing Experiments, Eden Press, Montreal, 1987.
- Harris, Robin, A History of Higher Education in Canada: 1663–1960, University of Toronto Press, Toronto, 1976.
- Harry, J., Smith, G., Lessard, Gilles, Forestry Resources Research in Canada, Science Council of Canada, Ottawa 1971.
- Hayes, F. Ronald, The Chaining of Prometheus: Evolution of a Power Structure for Canadian Science, University of Toronto Press, Toronto, 1973.
- Hopps, John A., Passing Pulses: The Pacemaker and Medical Engineering: A Canadian Story, Publishing Plus Limited, Ottawa, 1995.
- Jarrell, Richard, The Cold Light of Dawn: A History of Canadian Astronomy, University of Toronto Press, Toronto, 1988.
- Johnstone, Kenneth, The Aquatic Explorers: A History of the Fisheries Research Board of Canada, Fisheries Research Board/University of Toronto Press, Toronto, 1977.
- King, Christine, E.W.R. Steacie and Science in Canada, University of Toronto Press, Toronto, 1989.
- Knowles Middleton, W.E., Physics at the National Research Council of Canada, Wilfrid Laurier University Press, Waterloo, Ontario, 1979.
- Knowles Middleton, W.E., Radar Development in Canada: The Radio Branch of the National Research Council of Canada, 1939–1946, Wilfrid Laurier University Press, Waterloo, Ontario, 1981.
- Kruus, P., Basic Research, Science Council of Canada, Ottawa, 1971.
- Lamontagne, Maurice, Une politique scientifique canadienne, Volume I—Une analyse critique: Le passe et le present, Information Canada, Ottawa, 1971.
- Levere, Jarrell, A Curious Field Book: Science and Society in Canadian History, Oxford University Press, Toronto, 1974.
- Lithwick, Canada's Science Policy, Methuen, Toronto, 1969.
- MacDermot, H.E., One Hundred Years of Medicine in Canada 1867–1967, McClelland and Stewart, Toronto, 1967.
- OECD, Reviews of National Science Policy: Canada, OECD Publications, Paris, 1969.
- Ouellet, Cyrias, La vie des sciences au Canada Francais, Ministere des Affaires culturelles, Quebec, 1964.
- Rose, D.C. er al., Physics in Canada: Survey and Outlook, Science Secretariat, Ottawa, 1967.
- Royal Society of Canada, Fifty Years Retrospect, Canada 1882–1932, The Ryerson Press, Toronto, 1932.
- Smallman, B.N., et al., Agriculture Science in Canada, Science Council of Canada, Ottawa, 1970.
- Spalding, David, Into the Dinosaurs' Graveyard, Doubleday Canada, Toronto, 1999.
- Stewart, R.W., Dickie, L.M., Ad Mare: Canada Looks to the Sea—A Study on Marine Science and Technology, Science Council of Canada, Ottawa 1971.
- Taylor, Baskerville, A Concise Business History of Canada, Oxford University Press, Toronto, 1994.
- Thomson, Don W., Men and Mericians Volumes 1,2,3, Information Canada, Ottawa, 1966.
- Thomson, Malcolm, M., The Beginning of the Long Dash: A History of Timekeeping in Canada, University of Toronto Press, Toronto, 1978.
- Thistle, Mel, The Inner Ring: The Early History of the National Research Council of Canada, University of Toronto Press, Toronto, 1966.
- Wallace, W. Stewart ed., The Royal Canadian Institute Centennial Volume 1849–1949, Royal Canadian Institute, Toronto, 1949.
- Warrington, Newbold, Chemical Canada: Past and Present, The Chemical Institute of Canada, Ottawa, 1970.
- Westman, A.E.R., Chemistry and Chemical Engineering: A Survey of Research and Development in Canada, The Science Council of Canada, Ottawa, 1969.
- Wilson, Andrew, Research Councils in the Provinces: A Canadian Resource, Science Council of Canada, Ottawa, 1971.
- Zaslow, Morris, Reading the Rocks: The Story of the Geological Survey of Canada 1842–1972, Macmillan of Canada, Toronto, 1975.
- Zeller, Suzanne, Inventing Canada: Early Victorian Science and the Idea of a Transcontinental Nation, University of Toronto Press, Toronto, 1987.

== Invention ==
- Ainley, Marianne Gosztonyi, ed., Despite All Odds: Essays on Canadian Women and Science, Vehicle Press, Montreal, 1990.
- Anstey, T.Branch Agriculture Canada, Historical Series No. 27, 1986.
- Avery, Donald H., The Science of War: Canadian Scientists and Allied Military Technology During the Second World War, University of Toronto Press, Toronto, 1998.
- Babaian, Sharon, Radio Communication in Canada: A Historical and Technological Survey, Transformation Series 1, National Museum of Science and Technology, Ottawa, 1992.
- Babbitt, J.D. ed., Science in Canada: Selections from the Speeches of Dr. E.W.R. Steacie, University of Toronto Press, Toronto, 1965.
- Ball, Norman R., Mind, Heart, and Vision: Professional Engineering in Canada 1887 to 1987, National Museum of Science and Technology/Museums of Canada, Ottawa, 1987.
- Ball, Norman R. ed., Building Canada: A History of Public Works, University of Toronto Press, Toronto, 1988.
- Barris, Theodore, Fire Canoe: Prairie Steamboat Days Revisited, McClelland and Stewart, Toronto, 1977.
- Berger, Carl, Science, God, and Nature in Victorian Canada, University of Toronto Press, Toronto, 1983.
- Bothwell, Robert, Nucleus: The History of Atomic Energy of Canada Limited, University of Toronto Press, Toronto, 1988.
- Brown, J.J., Ideas in Exile, McClelland and Stewart, Toronto, 1967.
- Bryden, John, Deadly Allies: Canada's Secret War 1937 - 1947, McClelland & stewart, Toronto, 1989.
- Chapman, J.H., et al., Upper Atmosphere and Space Programmes in Canada, Science Secretariat, Ottawa, 1967.
- Collins, Robert, A Voice from Afar: The History of Telecommunications in Canada, McGraw-Hill Ryerson, 1977.
- Dewalt, Bryan, Building a Digital Network in Canada: Data Communications and Digital Telephony, 1959-1990, Transformation Series 2, National Museum of Science and Technology, Ottawa, 1992.
- Dewalt, Bryan, Technology and Canadian Printing: A History from Lead Type to Lasers, Transformation Series 3, National Museum of Science and Technology, Ottawa, 1995.
- Eggleston, Wilfred, National Research in Canada: The NRC 1916 - 1966, Clarke Irwin, Toronto, 1978.
- Faucher, Philippe, Grands projets et innovations technologiques au Canada, Les presses de l'université de Montréal, Montreal, 1999.
- Germain, Georges-Hebert, Le Génie Québécois: Histoire d'une conquête, Ordre des ingénieurs du Québec/Libre Expression, Montreal, 1995.
- Guillet, Edwin C., The Story of Canadian Roads, University of Toronto Press, Toronto, 1967.
- Harry, J., Smith, G., Lessard, Gilles, Forestry Resources Research in Canada, Science Council of Canada, Ottawa 1971.
- Hopps, John A., Passing Pulses: The Pacemaker and Medical Engineering: A Canadian Story, Publishing Plus Limited, Ottawa, 1995.
- Knowles Middleton, W.E., Radar Development in Canada: The Radio Branch of the National Research Council of Canada, 1939-1946, Wilfrid Laurier University Press, Waterloo, Ontario, 1981.
- Koppel, Ted, Powering the Future: the Ballard Fuel Cell and the Race to Change the World, John Wiley & Sons, Etobicoke, 1999.
- Lowther, William, Arms and the Man: Dr. Gerald Bull, Iraq and the Supergun, Doubleday Canada Limites, Toronto, 1991.
- MacDermot, H.E., One Hundred Years of Medicine in Canada 1867-1967, McClelland and Stewart, Toronto, 1967.
- Macpherson, Burgess, The Ships of Canada's Naval Forces 1910-1985, Collins, Toronto, 1981.
- McDonnell, The History of Canadian Railroads, New Burlington Books, London, 1985.
- McGrath, T.M., History of Canadian Airports, Lugus Publications, Ottawa, 1992.
- Madger, Ted, Canada's Hollywood: The Canadian State and Feature Films, University of Toronto Press, Toronto, 1993.
- Maginley, Collin, The Ships of Canada's Marine Services, Vanwell, St. Catharines, 2001.
- Mayer, Roy, Inventing Canada: One Hundred Years of Innovation, Raincoast Books, Vancouver, 1997.
- Mayer, Roy, Scientific Canadian: Invention and Innovation from Canada's national Research Council, Raincoast Books, Vancouver, 1999.
- Milberry, Larry, Aviation in Canada, McGraw-Hill Ryerson, Toronto, 1979.
- Millard, J. Rodney, The Master Spirit of the Age: Canadian Engineers and the Politics of Professionalism 1887 - 1922, University of Toronto Press, Toronto, 1988.
- Morton, Desmond, A Military History of Canada, Hurtig, Edmonton, 1990.
- Mouat, Jeremy, Metal Mining in Canada, 1840–1950, Transformation Series 9, National Museum of Science and Technology, Ottawa, 2000.
- Muise, McIntosh, Coal Mining in Canada: A Historical and Comparative Overview, Transformation Series 5, National Museum of Science and Technology, Ottawa, 1996.
- OECD, Reviews of National Science Policy: Canada, OECD Publications, Paris, 1969.
- Robertson, Heather, Driving Force, The McLaughlin Family and the Age of the Car, McClelland & Stewart, Toronto, 1995.
- Silversides, C.Ross, Broadaxe to Flying Shear: the Mechanization of Forest Harvesting East of the Rockies, Transformation Series 6, National Museum of Science and Technology, Ottawa, 1997.
- Smallman, B.N., et al., Agriculture Science in Canada, Science Council of Canada, Ottawa, 1970.
- Stewart, R.W., Dickie, L.M., Ad Mare: Canada Looks to the Sea - A Study on Marine Science and Technology, Science Council of Canada, Ottawa 1971.
- Taylor, Baskerville, A Concise Business History of Canada, Oxford University Press, Toronto, 1994.
- Thomson, Malcolm, M., The Beginning of the Long Dash: A History of Timekeeping in Canada, University of Toronto Press, Toronto, 1978.
- Tremblay, Robert, Histoire des outils manuels au Canada de 1828 a 1960, Transformation Series 10, National Museum of Science and Technology, Ottawa, 2001.
- Warrington, Newbold, Chemical Canada: Past and Present, The Chemical Institute of Canada, Ottawa, 1970.
- Weir, E. Austin, The Struggle for National Broadcasting in Canada, McClelland & Stewart, Toronto, 1965.
- Westman, A.E.R., Chemistry and Chemical Engineering: A Survey of Research and Development in Canada, The Science Council of Canada, Ottawa, 1969.
- Wilson, Andrew, Background to Invention, Science Council of Canada, 1970.
- Wilson, Andrew, Research Councils in the Provinces: A Canadian Resource, Science Council of Canada, Ottawa, 1971.
- Wilson, Garth, A History of Shipbuilding and Naval Architecture in Canada, Transformation Series 4, National Museum of Science and Technology, Ottawa, 1994.
- Williams, Michael, Massey Ferguson Tractors, Blandford Press, London, 1987.
- Zeller, Suzanne, Inventing Canada: Early Victorian Science and the Idea of a Transcontinental Nation, University of Toronto Press, Toronto, 1987.

== See also ==
- Bibliography of Canada
- Lists of books
- List of bibliographies
- Lists of important publications in science
