= Science and technology in Malawi =

Malawi is one of the least developed countries, but in 2014 it spent 1% of its gross domestic product (GDP) on research and development (R&D), making it have one of the highest ratios in Africa. The country has 93% of its population lacking access to electricity, 47% have improved sanitation, and one in four adults lacks any form of family planning.

The country's economy grew annually by 5.6% on average from 2003 to 2013. This makes it the sixth-fastest-growing economy in the Southern African Development Community (SADC). Between 2009 and 2013, GDP per capita rose by 6%, from US$713 to US$755 in purchasing power parity. It is projected that between 2015 and 2019, annual growth in GDP will range from 5% to 6%. Malawi's ratio of donor funding to capital formation rose over the period 2007–2012. The African continent plans to create an African Economic Community by 2028, which would be built on the main regional economic communities, including the SADC.

Malawi has one of the lowest levels of human development in the SADC. It is also one of three African countries that have been "making especially impressive progress for several Millennium Development Goals", along with Gambia and Rwanda, with regard to primary school net enrolment (83% in 2009) and gender parity at the primary school level. Only 0.81% of students were enrolled in university in 2011. The number of students choosing to study abroad increased by 56% between 1999 and 2012, but their proportion decreased from 26% to 18% over the same period. Malawi devoted 5.4% of its GDP to education in 2011. Of this, 1.4% of the GDP went to higher education. Between 2006 and 2012, the number of students enrolled in higher education almost doubled to 12,203.

Malawi was ranked 125th in the Global Innovation Index in 2025.

== Economy ==
GDP in Southern African Development Community countries by the economic sector in 2013 or the closest available year.

The economy of Malawi is predominantly agricultural. Over 80% of the population is engaged in subsistence farming, even though agriculture only contributes 27% of the GDP. The services sector accounts for more than half of GDP (54%), compared to 11% for manufacturing and 8% for other industries, including natural uranium mining. Malawi invests more in agriculture (as a share of GDP) than any other African country: 28% of GDP.

Agriculture accounts for 90% of export revenue. The three most important export crops are: tobacco, tea, and sugar cane. The tobacco sector alone accounted for half of the exports. Moreover, most products are exported in a raw or semi-processed state. Tobacco accounts for half of the country's exports (50%), natural uranium and its compounds for a further 10%, and raw sugar cane for 8%.

The government's attempts to diversify the agriculture sector have been constrained by poor infrastructure, an inadequately trained workforce, and its business climate.

=== National Export Strategy ===
In 2013, the government adopted a National Export Strategy to diversify the country's exports. Production facilities are to be established for a wide range of products within the three selected clusters: oil seed products, sugar cane products, and manufacturing. The government estimates that these three 'clusters' have the potential to represent more than 50% of Malawi's exports by 2027. The strategy also helps companies obtain grants to invest in technologies from sources such as the country's Export Development Fund and the Malawi Innovation Challenge Fund.

=== Fiscal incentives to attract foreign investors ===
Domestic expenditure on research in Southern Africa as a percentage of GDP in 2012 or the closest year.

Malawi's foreign direct investment (FDI) has been growing since 2011 due to a government reform of the financial management system and the adoption of the Economic Recovery Plan. In 2012, the majority of investors came from China (46%) and the UK (46%), with most FDI inflows going to infrastructure (62%) and the energy sector (33%). FDI in Malawi amounted to 3.2% of GDP in 2013.

The government has introduced a series of fiscal incentives to attract foreign investors, including tax breaks. In 2013, the Malawi Investment and Trade Centre put together an investment portfolio spanning 20 companies. Malawi's FDI inflows were recorded to be worth US$189 million in 2022, which is a 45.6 percentage point increase from US$129.5 million in 2021.

==== Malawi Innovation Challenge Fund ====
The Malawi Innovation Challenge Fund is a competitive facility through which businesses in Malawi's agricultural and manufacturing sectors can apply for grant funding for innovative projects. The first round of competitive bidding opened in April 2014. The fund is aligned with the three 'clusters': oil seed products, sugar cane products, and manufacturing. It provides a matching grant of up to 50% for innovative business projects. It is endowed with US$8 million from the United Nations Development Programme and the United Kingdom Department for International Development.

== Research and publications ==
Researchers (HC) in Southern Africa per million inhabitants in 2013 or the closest year

Despite being one of the poorest countries in the world, Malawi devoted 1.06% of GDP to gross domestic expenditure on research and development in 2010, according to a survey by the Department of Science and Technology, which makes it one of the highest ratios in Africa. This corresponds to US$7.8 per researcher. Malawi is considered to have a viable national innovation system by a UNESCO report.

In 2010, Malawi counted 123 researchers (in head counts) per million inhabitants, a median number for Southern Africa. This was a higher ratio than the average for sub-Saharan Africa as a whole: 91 researchers per million inhabitants. In Malawi, one in five researchers were women in 2010.

Scientific publication trends in the most productive SADC countries, 2005–2014

Between 2008 and 2014, scientists from Malawi collaborated most with their peers from the United States, followed by the UK, South Africa, and ex-aqueo Kenya and the Netherlands. In 2014, Malawian scientists had the third-largest output in Southern Africa in terms of articles catalogued in international journals. They published 322 articles in Thomson Reuters's Web of Science that year, almost triple the number in 2005, which had only 116 papers published. Only South Africa (9,309) and the United Republic of Tanzania (770) published more in that year.

The country's publication density was 19 publications per million inhabitants catalogued in international journals in 2014. This compares with 6 for Mozambique, 15 for the United Republic of Tanzania, 20 for Swaziland, 21 for Zimbabwe, 59 for Namibia, 71 for Mauritius, 103 for Botswana, and 364 for South Africa.

== Policies ==
=== Science ===
Scientific publications per million inhabitants in SADC countries in 2014

Malawi's first science and technology policy from 1991 was revised in 2002. Despite being approved, the 2002 policy has not been fully implemented, largely due to the lack of an implementation plan and an uncoordinated approach to the Systems Technology Institute. This policy has been under revision with UNESCO assistance to re-align its approaches with the second Malawi Growth and Development Strategy (2013).

Scientific research output in terms of publications in Southern Africa, cumulative totals by field, 2008–2014

The National Science and Technology Policy of 2002 envisaged the establishment of a National Commission for Science and Technology to advise the government and other stakeholders on science and technology-led development. Although the Science and Technology Act of 2003 made provision for the creation of this commission, it only became operational in 2011, with a secretariat resulting from the merger of the Department of Science and Technology and the National Research Council. The Science and Technology Act of 2003 also established a Science and Technology Fund to finance research and studies through government grants and loans. As of 2014, it was not yet operational.

The Secretariat of the National Commission for Science and Technology reviewed the Strategic Plan for Science, Technology and Innovation (2011–2015), but, as of early 2015, the revised policy had not yet met with Cabinet approval.

=== Education ===
In 2012, the Malawi University of Science and Technology (MUST) and the Lilongwe University of Agriculture and Natural Resources (LUANAR) planned to build the capacity of the Systems Technology Institute. LUANAR was delinked from the University of Malawi. This brings the number of public universities to four, along with the University of Malawi and Mzuzu University.

In December 2013, Malawi launched the Information and Communication Technology (ICT) Policy for Malawi to drive the deployment of ICTs in economic and productive sectors. A review of secondary school curricula in 2013 was also conducted. In May 2024, the MUST's 2024–2030 strategic plan was launched.

=== Policy framework ===
Malawi is not one of the four SADC countries that ratified the SADC Protocol on Science, Technology and Innovation (2008) by 2015. Ten of the 15 SADC countries must ratify the protocol for it to enter into force. As of 2015, only Botswana, Mauritius, Mozambique, and South Africa had done so. The protocol promotes legal and political cooperation. Two primary policy documents operationalize the SADC Treaty (1992), the Regional Indicative Strategic Development Plan for 2005–2020, adopted in 2003, and the Strategic Indicative Plan for the Organ (2004).

A 2013 mid-term review of the Regional Indicative Strategic Development Plan for 2005–2020 noted that limited progress had been made towards STI targets, owing to the lack of human and financial resources at the SADC Secretariat to coordinate the programmes. At a meeting in Maputo, Mozambique, in June 2014, SADC ministers adopted the SADC Regional Strategic Plan on Science, Technology and Innovation for 2015–2020 to guide the implementation of regional programmes.

In 1999, the SADC adopted a protocol governing wildlife, forestry, shared water courses, and the environment, including climate change, the SADC Protocol on Wildlife Conservation and Law Enforcement. In 2013, ministers responsible for the environment and natural resources approved the development of the SADC Regional Climate Change programme. In addition, COMESA, the East African Community, and SADC have been implementing an initiative since 2010 known as the Tripartite Programme on Climate Change Adaptation and Mitigation, or The African Solution to Address Climate Change.

== See also ==
- Science and technology in Botswana
- Science and technology in Tanzania
- Science and technology in Uganda
- Science and technology in Zimbabwe

== Sources ==
This article incorporates text from a free content work. Licensed under CC-BY-SA IGO. 3.0. Text taken from UNESCO Science Report: towards 2030, UNESCO.
