= Science and technology in Uganda =

Science and technology in Uganda refers to the growth within the technological industry in response to government efforts to develop a national innovation system, as well as any subsequent socioeconomic and cultural impacts of these endeavours.

In 2013, manufacturers contributed 10% of GDP, compared to 21% for the industry as a whole and 25% for agriculture. Half of GDP (54%) came from the services sector. In 2012, Uganda's main exports were all agricultural products: unroasted coffee (30.6%), cotton (5.6%) and tobacco (5.5%). In 2010, it spent less than 5% of GDP on agriculture, despite African countries having committed to the target of 10% when the African Union adopted the Maputo Declaration in 2003. They reiterated this goal in the Malabo Declaration adopted in Equatorial Guinea in 2014. In the latter declaration, they reaffirmed their 'intention to devote 10% of their national budgets to agricultural development and agreed to target such as doubling agricultural productivity, halving post-harvest loss and bringing stunting down to 10% across Africa. However, African leaders meeting in Equatorial Guinea failed to resolve the debate on establishing a common standard of measurement for the 10% target.

In 2013, Uganda was ranked 36th out of 52 countries on the Ibrahim Index of African Governance. Some 16% of the population had access to internet and 44% a mobile phone subscription in 2013. One in four (26%) Ugandans had access to sanitation, 42% to improved water and 15% to electricity in 2011. The government spent 4.3% of GDP on health and 1.9% of GDP on the military in 2013. Inflows of foreign direct investment amounted to 4.8% of GDP in 2013.

In 2014, the population was growing at a rate of 3.31% per year. In sub-Saharan Africa, only Niger (3.87% per year) and South Sudan (3.84%) recorded faster growth rates.

Public expenditure on education amounted to 3.3% of GDP in 2012. Of this, 11% (0.4% of GDP) was earmarked for higher education. Uganda has achieved universal primary education but only one-quarter of students attend secondary school (27% gross enrollment ratio in 2013) and 4.4% attend university. Uganda was ranked 124th in the Global Innovation Index in 2025

== Science policy framework ==
=== National science, technology and innovation policy ===
The National Science, Technology and Innovation Policy dates from 2009. Its overarching goal is to 'strengthen national capability to generate, transfer and apply scientific knowledge, skills and technologies that ensure sustainable utilisation of natural resources for the realisation of Uganda's development objectives.' The policy precedes Uganda Vision 2040, which was launched in April 2013 to transform 'Ugandan society from a peasant to a modern and prosperous country within 30 years,' in the words of the Cabinet. Uganda Vision 2040 vows to strengthen the private sector, improve education and training, modernize infrastructure and the underdeveloped services and agriculture sectors, foster industrialization and promote good governance, among other goals. Potential areas for economic development include oil and gas, tourism, minerals and information and communication technologies (ICTs).

The National Council for Science and Technology falls under the Ministry of Science, Technology and Innovation. The council's strategic objectives include:

- the rationalization of science and technology policy to boost technological innovation;
- enhancing the national system of research, intellectual property, product development and technology transfer;
- strengthening public acceptance of science and technology; and
- upgrading institutional research capacity.

The National Council for Science and Technology identified the following shortcomings in higher education in 2007:

- very few science degree programmes exist;
- enrolment in basic sciences is negligible;
- laboratories are generally scarce, under-equipped and obsolete;
- very limited funding exists for capital or recurrent expenses for training in science and engineering;
- almost all research funding comes from external (donor) sources, making it unsustainable and difficult to establish a national research programme to support a development-driven agenda;
- Despite the burgeoning enrolment, very little systematic attention is being paid to the development of domestic graduate education. Fewer than 500 professors in the entire country have PhDs and fewer than 10 new PhDs are awarded annually in sciences and engineering;
- fee policies and lack of adequate infrastructure for science and engineering encourage the expansion of undergraduate programmes in arts and humanities, resulting in a dwindling intake for courses in science and engineering and a general lack of interest in, and focus on, these areas;
- the universities and the general higher education, be it public or private, lack strategies to improve conditions for research.

=== Millennium Science Initiative ===
In 2007, the National Council for Science and Technology launched the Millennium Science Initiative (2007–2013), which was co-financed by the World Bank. At a time when the economy's formal sector was expanding rapidly and real investment was rising sharply, the Council considered that continued economic progress would require more and better use of knowledge and more and better qualified human resources for science and technology. To correct these shortcomings, the Millennium Science Initiative established a funding facility and an outreach programme. The funding facility provided competitive grants through three windows:

- top-end research involving both senior researchers and graduate students;
- the creation of undergraduate programmes in basic science and engineering; and
- support for cooperation with the private sector, which consisted of company internships for students and grants for technology platforms through which firms and researchers could collaborate on solving problems of direct interest to industry.

The Outreach Programme proposed a series of school visits by top scientists and researchers to change negative perceptions that deterred Ugandans from pursuing careers in science. A National Science Week was also established. In parallel, this second component sought to strengthen the institutional capacity of the National Council for Science and Technology and the Uganda Industrial Research Institute and, more generally, to improve policy implementation, evaluation and monitoring.

=== Presidential Initiative on Science and Technology ===
In July 2010, the Presidential Initiative on Science and Technology offered a further boost by creating a fund to foster innovation at Makerere University over the next five years. When President Museveni visited Makerere University in December 2009, he noticed that many undergraduate students had produced interesting prototypes of machines and implements, and that PhD students and senior researchers were working on inventions with potential for transforming rural Ugandan society but that innovation was being held back by the lack of modern research and teaching laboratories. After the visit, he decided to create a Presidential Innovations Fund endowed with UGX 25 billion (circa US$8.5 million) over five years to support innovation-related projects at the university's College of Engineering, Art, Design and Technology. The fund became operational in July 2010. It covered the cost of modernizing laboratories and the implementation of ten projects at the university. It also financed undergraduate science and engineering programmes, academia–private sector partnerships, student internships, science policy formulation and science popularization in schools and communities.

By 2014, the projects had developed:

- an academic records management system;
- more than 30 internet laboratories (ilabs) in the Department of Electrical and Computer Engineering;
- a business incubator, the Centre for Technology Design and Development;
- a Centre for Renewable Energy and Energy Conservation;
- more than 30 innovation clusters for metal, salt, coffee, milk, pineapple, etc.;
- appropriate irrigation;
- a vehicle design project (the Kiira EV car), which evolved into the Centre for Research in Transportation Technologies;
- makapads, the only sanitary wear for women in Africa made from natural materials (papyrus and paper), including for maternity use;
- a Community Wireless Resource Centre.

== Measures to promote innovation ==
=== Innovation hubs ===
Business incubation and innovation are being promoted by several Ugandan institutions, including the Uganda Industrial Research Institute and the Uganda Investment Authority. The latter is a parastatal agency which works in conjunction with the government to facilitate private sector investment. One of the authority's most flourishing sectors is ICT (Information and Communications Technology). This sector has seen major investment in recent years to develop Uganda's backbone infrastructure network, which consists of fibre-optic cables and related equipment, as well as mobile broadband infrastructure.

Uganda has an innovation hub named Hive Colab, which was launched in 2010 by AfriLabs and is headed by Barbara Birungi. It serves as a collaborative space to facilitate interaction among technology entrepreneurs, web and mobile app developers, designers, investors, venture capitalists and donors. Hive Colab provides facilities, support and advice to members to help them launch successful start-up enterprises. The hub offers a virtual incubation platform that is intended to assist entrepreneurial activity, particularly in rural areas. Its three programme focus areas are ICT and mobile technologies, climate technologies and agribusiness innovation.

Another incubator, the Consortium for enhancing University Responsiveness to Agribusiness Development Limited (CURAD), is a public–private partnership which targets young innovators in the agribusiness sector with the goal of generating new enterprises and employment. This non-profit company was launched in May 2014 and is based at Makerere University.

In September 2013, the government launched a Business Process Outsourcing Incubation Centre at the Uganda Bureau of Statistics House. The facility can accommodate 250 agents and is run by three private companies. The Government of Uganda has targeted this industry to address youth unemployment and stimulate investment in information-technology-enabled services.

=== Prizes ===
Since 2010, two annual prizes have incentivized innovation in Uganda. The first are the Community Innovations Awards, a competition for mobile apps that encourages university students to innovate in the areas of agriculture, health and education. Each year since 2012, Orange Uganda, a division of France Telecom, has sponsored this prize. Since 2010, the Uganda Communications Commission has also organized the Annual Communications Innovation Awards, which reward excellence in ICT innovation that contributes to national development goals. The prizes are awarded in several categories, including digital content, ICT for development, service excellence, business excellence and young ICT innovators.

=== Innovation and strategy firms ===
A new category of innovation and strategy firms such as Ortega Group are mushrooming in Uganda to complete the innovation ecosystem. Such firms are known as I&S firms.

== Research trends ==
=== Financial investment ===
Research funding climbed between 2008 and 2010 from 0.33% to 0.48% of GDP, according to the UNESCO Institute for Statistics. More than half of research expenditure (57.3%) came from abroad in 2010. The government contributed a further 21.9%, businesses 13.7%, higher education 1.0% and private non-profit organizations 6.0%.

The business enterprise sector's share of research funding progressed from 4.3% to 13.7% between 2008 and 2010 and spending on engineering rose from 9.8% to 12.2% of total research expenditure. This progression occurred to the detriment of agricultural research, which shrank from 53.6% to 16.7% of total spending.

Expenditure per researcher remained low in 2010 ($85 in purchasing power parity dollars) and amounted to just $7 per inhabitant.

=== Human capital ===
Researchers (HC) in Southern Africa per million inhabitants, 2013 or closest year

Enrolment in higher education rose from 92,605 to 140,087 between 2006 and 2011, in a context of strong population growth of 3.3% per year. In 2011, 4.4% of young Ugandans were enrolled at university. These figures cover students enrolled in post-secondary non-degree programmes, bachelor's, master's and PhD programmes. The government invested 0.4% of GDP in higher education in 2012, 11% of public education expenditure.

The number of researchers has climbed steadily over the past decade, even doubling between 2008 and 2010 in head counts from 1 387 to 2 823, according to the UNESCO Institute for Statistics. This represents a leap from 44 to 83 researchers per million inhabitants over the same period. One in four researchers is a woman.

=== Research output ===
The number of scientific publications tripled between 2005 and 2014 to 757 a year, according to Thomson Reuters' Web of Science (Science Citation Index Expanded). In 2014, Uganda had 19.5 publications per million inhabitants recorded in this international database. This places Uganda fifth in East and Central Africa for scientific output after Gabon, Cameroon, Kenya and the Republic of Congo. The average for sub-Saharan Africa in 2014 was 20 publications per million inhabitants and the global average 176 per million inhabitants

Ugandan research focuses on life sciences. Kenya and South Africa count among Uganda's top five research partners. Between 2008 and 2014, Uganda's main collaborators came from the United States (1,709 articles), United Kingdom (1,031 articles), Kenya (477 articles), South Africa (409 articles) and Sweden (311 articles).

== Regional economic communities ==
=== East African Community ===
==== Towards economic and scientific integration ====
Uganda is a member of the East African Community (EAC), along with Burundi, Kenya, Rwanda and Tanzania. The EAC's founding treaty of 1967 makes provision for co-operation among member states to develop science, technology and innovation. On 1 July 2010, the five EAC members formed a common market; the agreement provides for the free movement of goods, labour, services and capital. In 2014, Rwanda, Uganda and Kenya agreed to adopt a single tourist visa. Kenya, Tanzania and Uganda have also launched the East African Payment System.

The EAC Common Market Protocol (2010) makes provision for market-led research, technological development and the adaptation of technologies in the community, in order to support the sustainable production of goods and services and enhance international competitiveness. States are to collaborate with the East African Science and Technology Commission and other institutions to develop mechanisms for commercialising indigenous knowledge and ensuring intellectual property protection. Member states also undertake to establish a research and technological development fund for the purpose of implementing the provisions in the protocol. Other clauses include:

- promoting linkages among industries and other economic sectors within the EAC community;
- promoting industrial research and the transfer, acquisition, adaptation and development of modern technology;
- promoting sustainable and balanced industrialisation to cater for the least industrialised members;
- facilitating the development of micro-, small and medium-sized (SME) enterprises and promoting indigenous entrepreneurs; and
- promoting knowledge-based industries.

On 30 November 2013, the EAC countries signed a Monetary Union Protocol with the aim of establishing a common currency within 10 years. On 10 June 2015, the EAC, Southern African Development Community and the Common Market for Eastern and Southern Africa (COMESA) signed a Tripartite Free Trade Agreement. These agreements are part of a pan-African movement to create a free trade area and customs union in each regional economic community with a view to creating a pan-African Common Market by 2023 and an African Economic Community by 2028.

Increasingly, regional economic communities are also driving regional scientific integration. The Inter-University Council for East Africa (IUCEA) was formally integrated into the operational framework of the EAC by the East African Legislative Assembly in 2009 through the IUCEA Act. IUCEA has been entrusted with the mission of developing a Common Higher Education Area by 2015. In order to harmonise higher education systems in EAC countries, IUCEA established the East African Quality Assurance Network in 2011, which is in the process of developing a regional policy and an East African qualifications framework for higher education. IUCEA also established a partnership with the East African Business Council in 2011 to foster joint research and innovation by the private sector and universities and identify areas for curricular reform. The two partners organized the region's first forum for academia and private firms under the auspices of the EAC in Arusha in 2012 and a second with the East African Development Bank in Nairobi in 2013.

==== Centres of excellence in biomedical sciences ====
The East African Community (EAC) commissioned a study in 2011 which designated 19 centres of excellence from five EAC partner states. In October 2014, the 10th ordinary meeting of the EAC Sectoral Council of Ministers responsible for Health selected five of these centres for first-phase EAC funding, namely: the National Institute of Public Health (Burundi), Rift Valley Technical Training Institute (Kenya), University of Rwanda (formerly the Kigali Institute of Science and Technology), Uganda Industrial Research Institute and Taasisi ya Sanaa na Utamaduni Bagamoyo (Tanzania).

Complementing the EAC project, the African Development Bank (AfDB) approved bilateral loans in October 2014 amounting to US$98 million to finance the first phase of its own East Africa's Centres of Excellence for Skills and Tertiary Education in Biomedical Sciences programme. The AfDB project will contribute to developing a highly skilled labour force in biomedical sciences to meet the EAC's immediate labour market needs and support implementation of EAC's ‘free’ labour market protocols. One potential area for growth is medical tourism. The first phase of the AfDB project will support the creation of specialized centres of excellence in nephrology and urology in Kenya, cardiovascular medicine in Tanzania, biomedical engineering and e-health in Rwanda and oncology in Uganda. During the project's second phase, a centre of excellence will open in Burundi in nutritional sciences. The East Africa Kidney Institute will operate as part of the University of Nairobi and its teaching hospital, Kenyatta National Hospital. The other centres of excellence will be established at the University of Rwanda's College of Medicine and Health Sciences, the Uganda Cancer Institute and, in Tanzania, at Muhimbili University of Health and Allied Sciences. Some 140 master's and 10 PhD students will benefit from the programme, as well as 300 interns. The centres of excellence will be expected to collaborate with internationally renowned establishments to develop quality curricula, joint research, promote interuniversity exchanges and mentoring programmes and to give access to documentary resources.

=== Intergovernmental Authority on Development ===
Uganda is a member of the Intergovernmental Authority on Development (IGAD), a regional economic community grouping Djibouti, Eritrea, Ethiopia, Kenya, Somalia, Sudan and South Sudan. IGAD's flagship programme for the period 2013–2027 sets out to develop drought-resilient communities, institutions and ecosystems in the IGAD region by 2027. The six thrusts of IGAD's Drought Resilience programme are:

- Natural resources and environment;
- Market access, trade and financial services;
- Livelihoods support and basic social services;
- Research, knowledge management and technology transfer;
- Conflict prevention, resolution and peace-building; and
- Co-ordination, institutional development and partnership.

== Bilateral cooperation in science and technology ==
Uganda is one of a number of East and Central African countries that have entered into bilateral cooperation agreements with South Africa in science and technology. Since 2009, Uganda has been developing cooperation with South Africa in the fields of biosciences, space science and technology, mathematics, energy, environment, climate change and indigenous knowledge.

== Global Health Security Agenda ==
The Ebola epidemic in 2014 highlighted the challenge of mobilising funds, equipment and human resources to manage a rapidly evolving health crisis. In 2015, the United States of America decided to invest US$1 billion over the next five years in preventing, detecting and responding to future infectious disease outbreaks in 17 countries, within its Global Health Security Agenda. Uganda is one of these 17 countries. The others are: (in Africa) Burkina Faso, Cameroon, Côte d'Ivoire, Ethiopia, Guinea, Kenya, Liberia, Mali, Senegal, Sierra Leone and Tanzania; (in Asia): Bangladesh, India, Indonesia, Pakistan and Vietnam.

== Recent development ==
Uganda made its first official foray into space development on November 7, 2022, launching its first satellite. Named PearlAfricaSat-1, the new tool will be used for increased accuracy with regard to weather and geology, mineral mapping, agriculture monitoring and border security.

Even more ambitiously, the new Uganda satellite will conduct important health tech experiments aimed at 3-D biological printing of human tissue in space. This mission will also examine how "microgravity influences ovary function."

PearlAfricaSat-1has landed on the International Space Station and will be closely monitored from Kampala, the capital city of Uganda.

== See also ==
- Mbarara University of Science and Technology

== Sources ==
This article incorporates text from a free content work. Licensed under CC-BY-SA IGO 3.0. Text taken from UNESCO Science Report: towards 2030, 499-533, UNESCO, UNESCO Publishing.
