= Central Asia =

Subregion of the Asian continent

- Area: 4,003,451 km^{2} (1,545,741 sq mi)
- Population: 75,897,577 (2021) (16th)
- Population density: 17.43/km^{2} (45.1/sq mi)
- GDP (PPP): ▲$1.87 trillion (2026)
- GDP (nominal): ▲$706.89 billion (2026)
- GDP per capita: ▲$8,324 (2026; nominal) ▲$22,017 (2026; PPP)
- HDI: ▲0.818 (very high) (Note: 2023 data from 2025 report for "Europe and Central Asia" regional designation)
- Demonym: Central Asian
- Countries: 5 recognized: Kazakhstan; Kyrgyzstan; Tajikistan; Turkmenistan; Uzbekistan
- Languages: Dungan, Karakalpak, Kazakh, Koryo-mar, Kyrgyz, Mongolian, Russian, Tajik, Turkmen, Uyghur, Uzbek, and others
- Time zones: 2 time zones: UTC+05:00: Standard: Kazakhstan, Tajikistan, Turkmenistan, Uzbekistan; UTC+06:00: Standard: Kyrgyzstan
- Largest cities: List^{a}: (Kazakhstan) Aktöbe; (Uzbekistan) Andijan; (Kazakhstan) Almaty; (Turkmenistan) Ashgabat; (Kazakhstan) Astana; (Kyrgyzstan) Bishkek; (Tajikistan) Dushanbe; (Uzbekistan) Fergana; (Kazakhstan) Karagandy; (Uzbekistan) Namangan; (Uzbekistan) Samarkand; (Kazakhstan) Shymkent; (Uzbekistan) Tashkent
- UN M49 codes: 143 – Central Asia; 142 – Asia; 001 – World

Central Asia is a region of Asia consisting of Kyrgyzstan, Tajikistan, Turkmenistan, Uzbekistan, and most of Kazakhstan. The countries as a group are also colloquially referred to as the "-stans" as all have names ending with the Persian suffix "-stan" (meaning 'land') in both respective native languages and most other languages. The region is bounded by the Caspian Sea to the southwest, European Russia to the northwest, East Asia to the east, West Asia and South Asia to the south, and North Asia to the north. Together, the five Central Asian countries have a total population of around 76 million.

In the pre-Islamic and early Islamic eras (c. 1000 and earlier), Central Asia was inhabited predominantly by Iranian peoples, mainly by Eastern Iranian-speaking Bactrians, Sogdians, Chorasmians, and the semi-nomadic Scythians and Dahae. As the result of Turkic migration, Central Asia also became the homeland for the Kazakhs, Kyrgyzs, Tatars, Turkmens, Uyghurs, and Uzbeks; Turkic languages largely replaced the Iranian languages spoken in the area, with the exception of Tajikistan and areas where Tajik is spoken.

The Silk Road trade routes crossed through Central Asia, leading to the rise of prosperous trade cities. The region was a crossroads for the movement of people, goods, and ideas between Europe and the Far East. Most countries in Central Asia are still integral to parts of the world economy.

From the mid-19th century until near the end of the 20th century, Central Asia was incorporated into the Russian Empire, and later the Soviet Union, which led to Russians and other Slavs colonising the area. Modern-day Central Asia is home to a large population of descendants of European settlers, who mostly live in Kazakhstan: 7 million Russians, 500,000 Ukrainians, and about 170,000 Germans. During the Stalinist period, the forced deportation of Koreans in the Soviet Union resulted in a population of over 300,000 Koreans in the region.

Central Asia has historically been a region of geostrategic importance because of its location at the confluence of several power centres, in particular Russia and China. It has never been a cohesive power in its own right, rather it has served as a battleground for extra-regional influences. However, efforts to integrate economically have regained momentum since the death of Uzbek president Islam Karimov in 2016, with new initiatives like the Almaty–Bishkek Economic Corridor and the 'Silk Seven Plus' proposals gaining traction.

== Countries and territory ==
=== Historical definitions ===
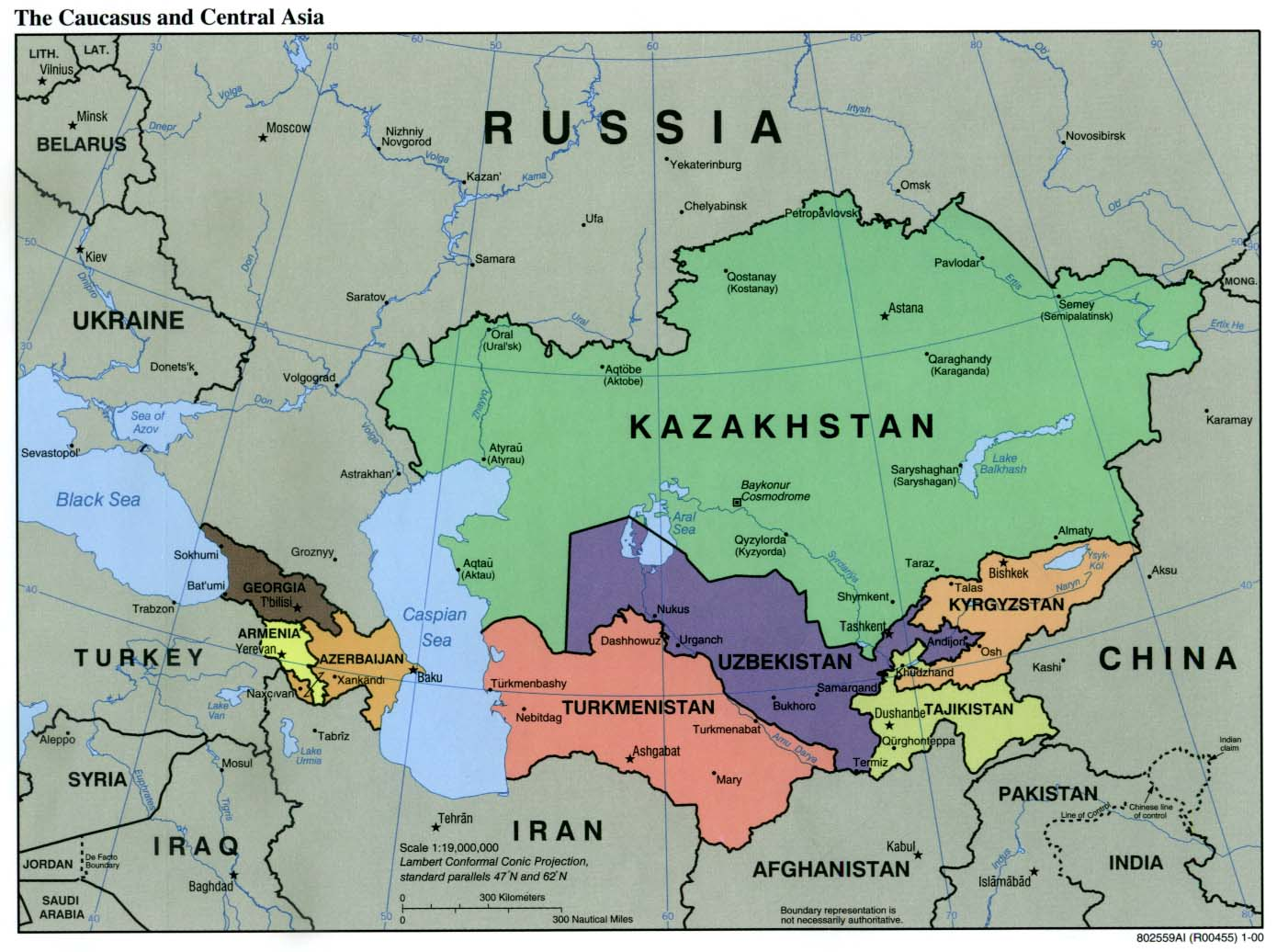
Political map of Central Asia and the Caucasus (2000)

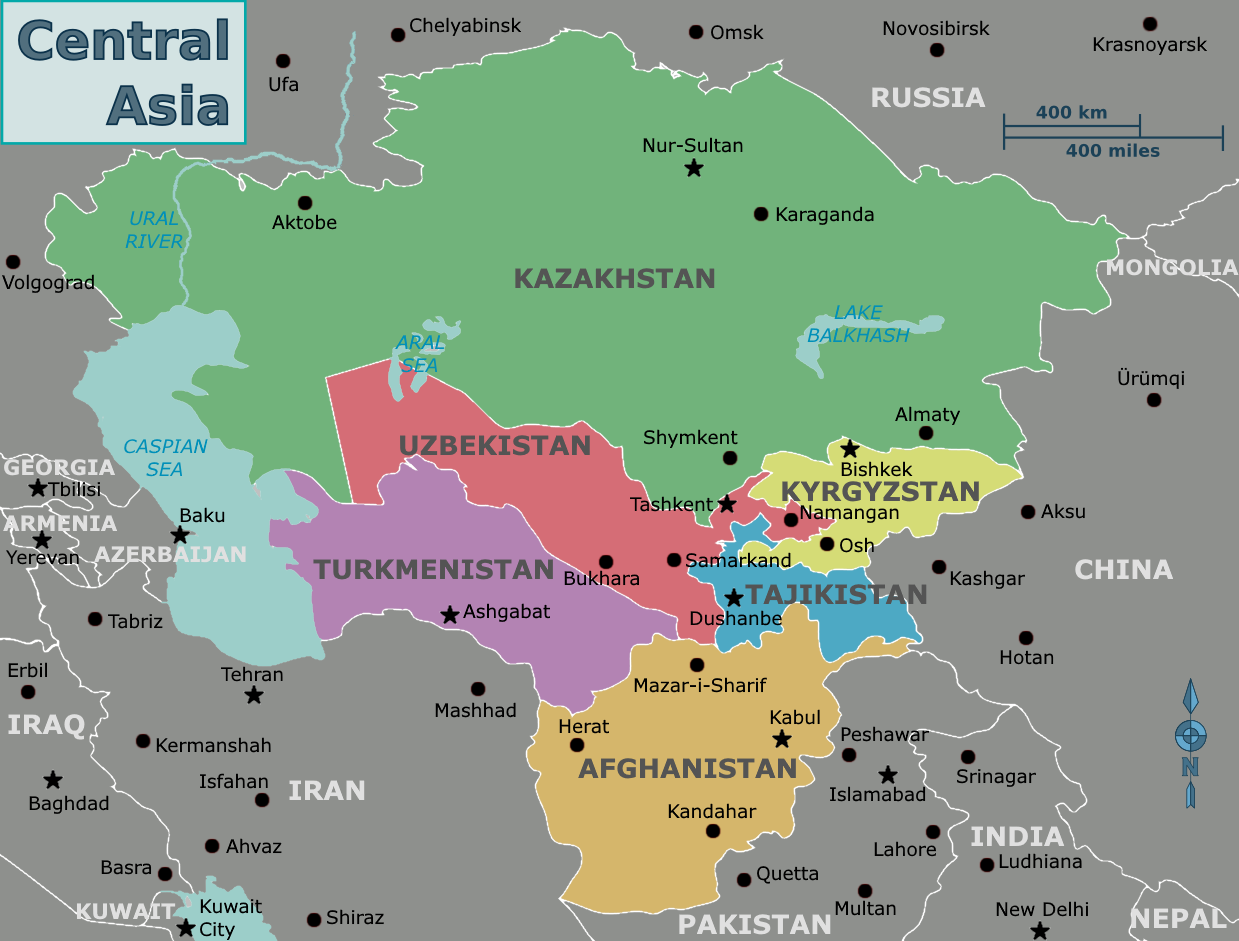
Political map of Central Asia including Afghanistan

One of the first geographers to mention Central Asia as a distinct region of the world was Alexander von Humboldt. The borders of Central Asia are subject to multiple definitions. Historically, political geography and culture have been two significant parameters widely used in scholarly definitions of Central Asia. Humboldt's definition comprised every country between 5° North and 5° South of the latitude 44.5°N. Humboldt mentions some geographic features of this region, which include the Caspian Sea in the west, the Altai mountains in the north and the Hindu Kush and Pamir mountains in the South. He did not give an eastern border for the region. His legacy is still seen: Humboldt University of Berlin, named after him, offers a course in Central Asian studies. The Russian geographer Nikolaĭ Khanykov questioned the latitudinal definition of Central Asia and preferred a physical one of all countries located in the region landlocked from water, including Afghanistan, Khorasan (Northeast Iran), Kyrgyzstan, Tajikistan, Turkmenistan, East Turkestan (Xinjiang), Mongolia, and Uzbekistan.

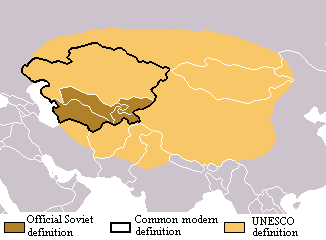
Three sets of possible boundaries for the Central Asia region (which overlap with conceptions of South and East Asia).

Russian culture has two distinct terms: Средняя Азия (Srednyaya Aziya or "Middle Asia", the narrower definition, which includes only those traditionally non-Slavic, Central Asian lands that were incorporated within those borders of historical Russia) and Центральная Азия (Tsentralnaya Aziya or "Central Asia", the wider definition, which includes Central Asian lands that have never been part of historical Russia). The latter definition includes Afghanistan and 'East Turkestan'.

The most limited definition was the official one of the Soviet Union, which defined Middle Asia as consisting solely of Kyrgyzstan, Tajikistan, Turkmenistan, and Uzbekistan, omitting Kazakhstan. Soon after the dissolution of the Soviet Union in 1991, the leaders of the four former Soviet Central Asian Republics met in Tashkent and declared that the definition of Central Asia should include Kazakhstan as well as the original four included by the Soviets. Since then, this has become the most common definition of Central Asia.

In 1978, UNESCO defined the region as "Afghanistan, north-eastern Iran, Pakistan, northern India, western China, Mongolia and the Soviet Central Asian Republics".

An alternative method is to define the region based on ethnicity, and in particular, areas populated by Eastern Turkic, Eastern Iranian, or Mongolian peoples. These areas include Xinjiang Uyghur Autonomous Region, the Turkic regions of southern Siberia, the five republics, and Afghan Turkestan. Afghanistan as a whole, the northern and western areas of Pakistan and the Kashmir Valley of India may also be included. The Tibetans and Ladakhis are also included. Most of the mentioned peoples are considered indigenous to the region. Central Asia is sometimes referred to as Turkestan.

=== Country data ===
The countries most commonly included in the Central Asia grouping are Kyrgyzstan, Tajikistan, Turkmenistan, Uzbekistan, and Kazakhstan.

Country	Area km^{2}	Population (2021)	Population density per km^{2}	Nominal GDP (2026)	GDP per capita (2026)	HDI (2023)	Capital	Official languages
Kazakhstan	2,724,900	19,196,465	6.3	▲$360.456 billion	▲$17,503	▲0.837	Astana	Kazakh, Russian
Kyrgyzstan	199,950	6,527,743	29.7	▲$23.606 billion	▲$3,202	▲0.720	Bishkek	Kyrgyz, Russian
Tajikistan	142,550	9,750,064	60.4	▲$20.418 billion	▲$1,939	▲0.691	Dushanbe	Tajik, Russian
Turkmenistan	488,100	6,341,855	11.1	▲$83.065 billion	▲$12,300	▲0.764	Ashgabat	Turkmen
Uzbekistan	448,978	36,024,900	69.1	▲$181.502 billion	▲$4,661	▲0.740	Tashkent	Uzbek

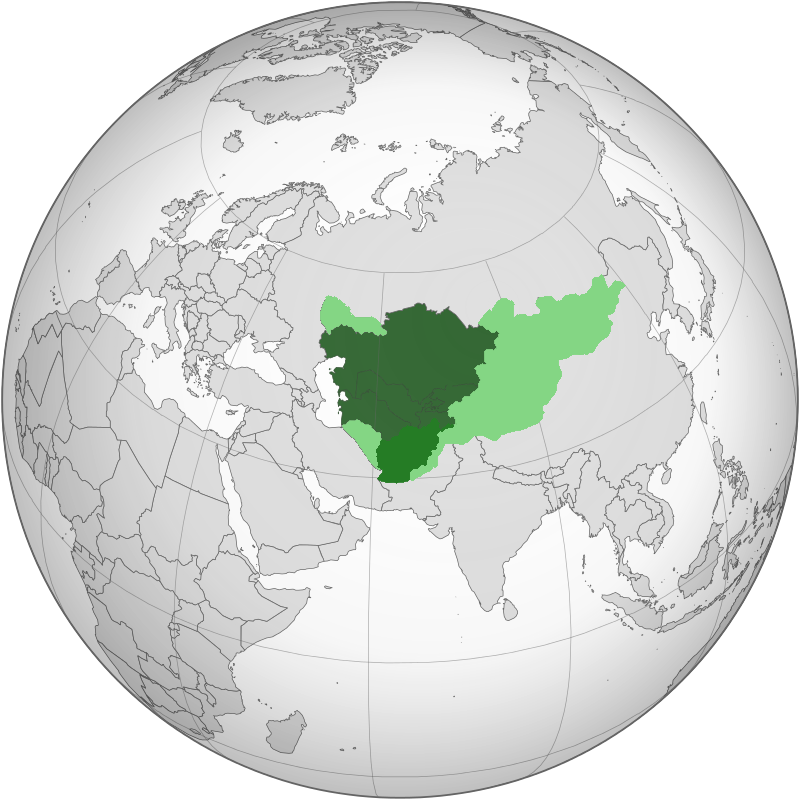
Expanded definition of Central Asia. Core definition that includes the five post-Soviet states in dark green. Afghanistan, the most commonly added country to Central Asia, in green. Regions that are sometimes considered part of Central Asia in light green.

== Geography ==
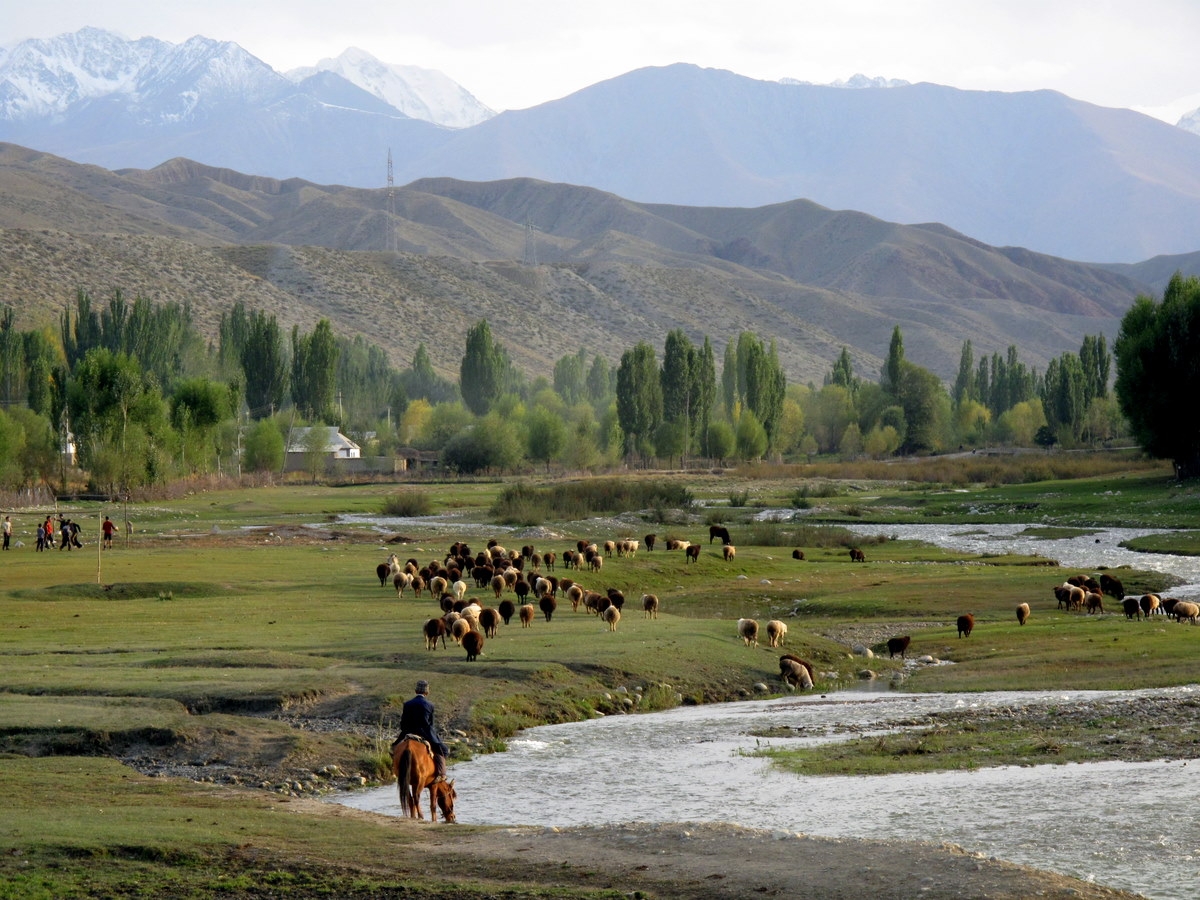
On the south shore of Issyk Kul lake, Issyk Kul Region

Central Asia is a region of varied geography, including high passes and mountains (Tian Shan), vast deserts (Kyzyl Kum, Taklamakan), and especially treeless, grassy steppes. The vast steppe areas of Central Asia are considered together with the steppes of Eastern Europe as a homogeneous geographical zone known as the Eurasian Steppe.

Much of the land of Central Asia is too dry or too rugged for farming. The Gobi Desert extends from the foot of the Pamirs, 77° E, to the Great Khingan (Da Hinggan) Mountains, 116°–118° E.

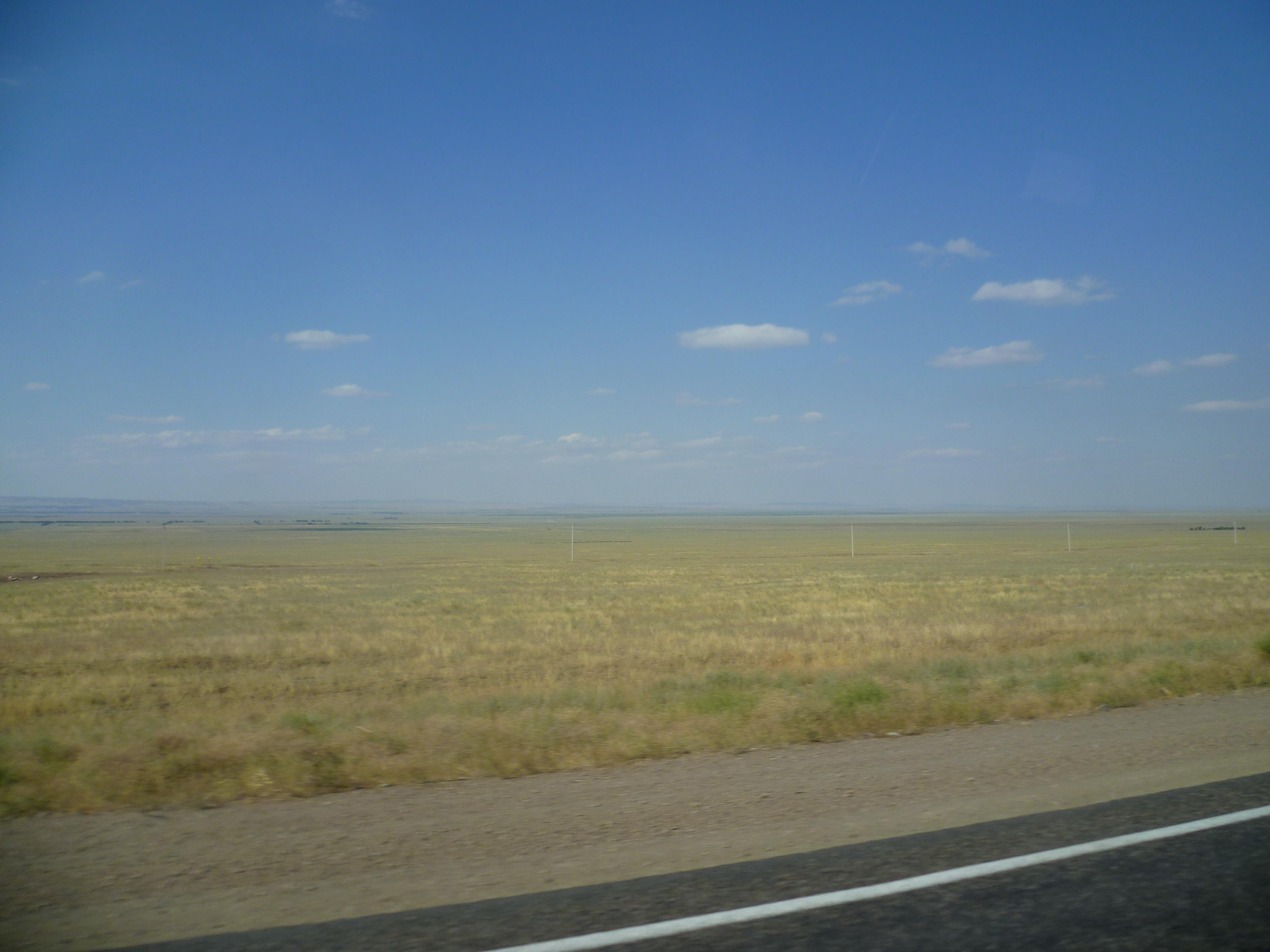
The Eurasian Steppe in Kazakhstan has a semi-arid, continental climate

Central Asia has the following geographic extremes:

- The world's northernmost desert (sand dunes), at Buurug Deliin Els, Mongolia, 50°18' N.
- The Northern Hemisphere's southernmost permafrost, at Erdenetsogt sum, Mongolia, 46°17' N.
- The world's shortest distance between non-frozen desert and permafrost: 770 km (480 mi).
- The Eurasian pole of inaccessibility.

A majority of the people earn a living by herding livestock. Industrial activity centers in the region's cities.

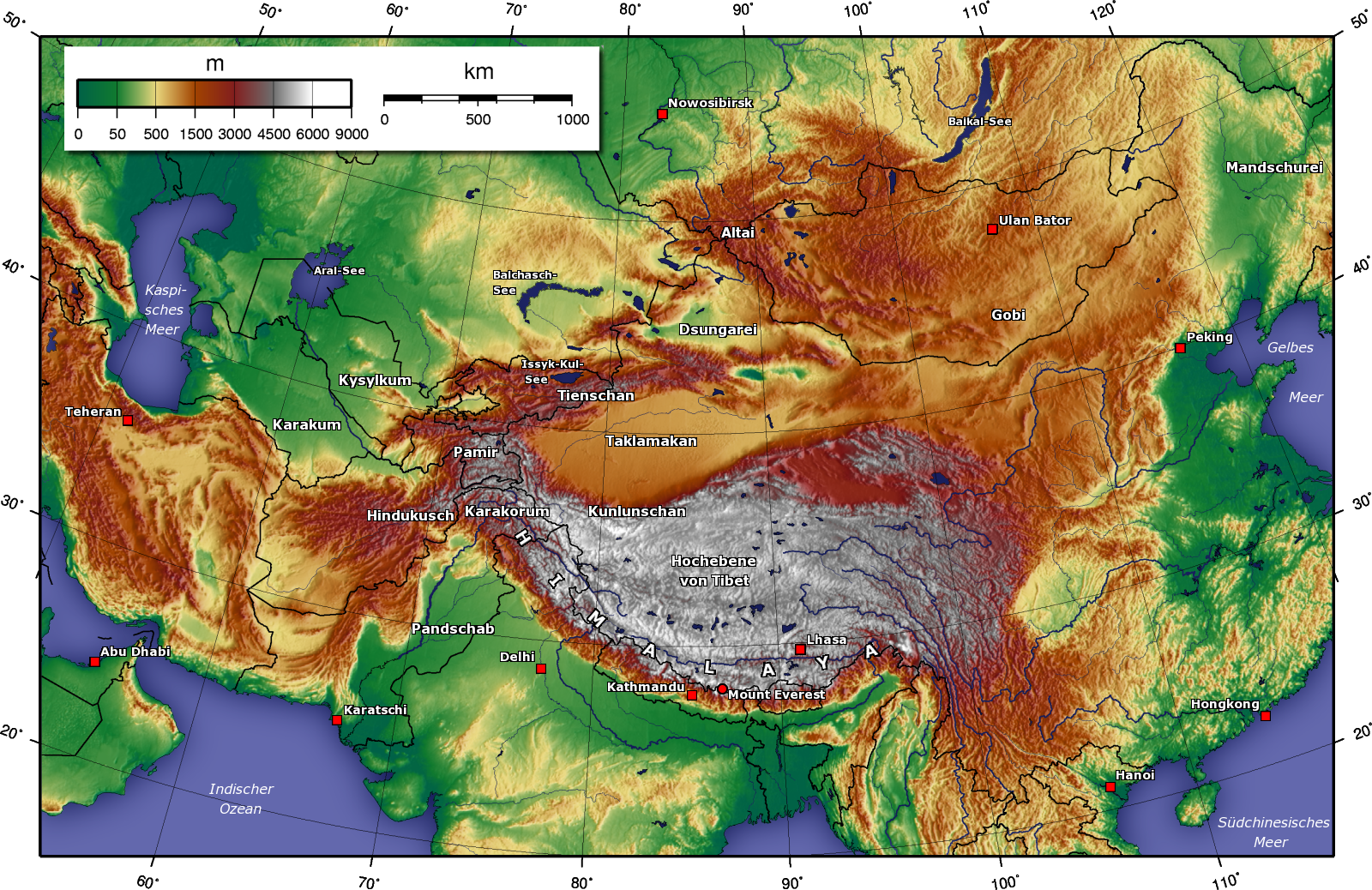
Topographic map of Central Asia.

=== Regions ===
Historical regions of Central Asia
on a map of Kazakhstan

Central Asia is bounded on the north by the forests of Siberia. The northern half of Central Asia (Kazakhstan) is the middle part of the Eurasian steppe. Westward the Kazakh steppe merges into the Russian-Ukrainian steppe and eastward into the steppes and deserts of Dzungaria and Mongolia. Southward the land becomes increasingly dry and the nomadic population increasingly thin. The south supports areas of dense population and cities wherever irrigation is possible. The main irrigated areas are along the eastern mountains, along the Oxus and Jaxartes Rivers and along the north flank of the Kopet Dagh near the Persian border. East of the Kopet Dagh is the important oasis of Merv and then a few places in Afghanistan like Herat and Balkh. Two projections of the Tian Shan create three "bays" along the eastern mountains.

Historical Regions of Central Asia
on a map of Uzbekistan

The largest, in the north, is eastern Kazakhstan, traditionally called Jetysu or Semirechye which contains Lake Balkhash. In the center is the small but densely populated Ferghana valley. In the south is Bactria, later called Tocharistan, which is bounded on the south by the Hindu Kush mountains of Afghanistan. The Syr Darya (Jaxartes) rises in the Ferghana valley and the Amu Darya (Oxus) rises in Bactria. Both flow northwest into the Aral Sea. Where the Oxus meets the Aral Sea it forms a large delta called Khwarazm and later the Khanate of Khiva. North of the Oxus is the less-famous but equally important Zarafshan River which waters the great trading cities of Bokhara and Samarkand. The other great commercial city was Tashkent northwest of the mouth of the Ferghana valley. The land immediately north of the Oxus was called Transoxiana and also Sogdia, especially when referring to the Sogdian merchants who dominated the silk road trade.

Historic cities of Central Asia
Kokand is one of the many towns that rose and fell in the Ferghana Valley

To the east, Dzungaria and the Tarim Basin were united into the Manchu-Chinese province of Xinjiang (Sinkiang; Hsin-kiang) about 1759. Caravans from China usually went along the north or south side of the Tarim basin and joined at Kashgar before crossing the mountains northwest to Ferghana or southwest to Bactria. A minor branch of the silk road went north of the Tian Shan through Dzungaria and Zhetysu before turning southwest near Tashkent. Nomadic migrations usually moved from Mongolia through Dzungaria before turning southwest to conquer the settled lands or continuing west toward Europe.

The Kyzyl Kum Desert or semi-desert is between the Oxus and Jaxartes, and the Karakum Desert is between the Oxus and Kopet Dagh in Turkmenistan. Khorasan meant approximately northeast Persia and northern Afghanistan. Margiana was the region around Merv. The Ustyurt Plateau is between the Aral and Caspian Seas.

To the southwest, across the Kopet Dagh, lies Persia. From here Persian and Islamic civilisation penetrated Central Asia and dominated its high culture until the Russian conquest. In the southeast is the route to India. In early times Buddhism spread north and throughout much of history warrior kings and tribes would move southeast to establish their rule in northern India. Most nomadic conquerors entered from the northeast. After 1800, western civilisation in its Russian and Soviet form penetrated from the northwest.

Names of historical regions

- Ariana
- Bactria
- Dahistan
- Khorasan
- Khwarazm
- Margiana
- Parthia
- Sogdia
- Tokharistan
- Transoxiana
- Turan
- Turkestan

=== Cities ===
Cities in Central Asia
City	Country	Population	Image	Information
Astana	Kazakhstan	1,006,574 (2017)		The capital and second largest city in Kazakhstan. After Kazakhstan gained its independence in 1991, the city and the region were renamed from Tselinograd to Aqmola. The name was often translated as "White Tombstone", but actually means "Holy Place" or "Holy Shrine". The "White Tombstone" literal translation was too appropriate for many visitors to escape notice in almost all guide books and travel accounts. In 1994, the city was designated as the future capital of the newly independent country and again renamed to the Astana after the capital was officially moved from Almaty in 1997. In 2019 the city was renamed to Nur-Sultan to honor the resigned president, but was reverted to Astana in 2022.
Almaty	Kazakhstan	1,713,220 (2017)		It was the capital of Kazakhstan (and its predecessor, the Kazakh SSR) from 1929 to 1998. Despite losing its status as the capital, Almaty remains the major commercial center of Kazakhstan. It is a recognised financial center of Kazakhstan and the Central Asian region.
Bishkek	Kyrgyzstan	1,027,200 (2019)		The capital and the largest city of Kyrgyzstan. Bishkek is also the administrative center of Chüy Region, which surrounds the city, even though the city itself is not part of the region, but rather a region-level unit of Kyrgyzstan.
Osh	Kyrgyzstan	243,216 (2009)		The second largest city of Kyrgyzstan. Osh is also the administrative center of Osh Region, which surrounds the city, even though the city itself is not part of the region, but rather a region-level unit of Kyrgyzstan.
Dushanbe	Tajikistan	780,000 (2014)		The capital and largest city of Tajikistan. Dushanbe means "Monday" in Tajik and Persian, and the name reflects the fact that the city grew on the site of a village that originally was a popular Monday marketplace.
Ashgabat	Turkmenistan	1,032,000 (2014)		The capital and largest city of Turkmenistan. Ashgabat is a relatively young city, growing out of a village of the same name established by Russians in 1818. It is not far from the site of Nisa, the ancient capital of the Parthians, and it grew on the ruins of the Silk Road city of Konjikala, which was first mentioned as a wine-producing village in the 2nd century BC and was leveled by an earthquake in the 1st century BC (a precursor of the 1948 Ashgabat earthquake). Konjikala was rebuilt because of its advantageous location on the Silk Road, and it flourished until its destruction by Mongols in the 13th century AD. After that, it survived as a small village until the Russians took over in the 19th century.
Bukhara	Uzbekistan	237,900 (1999)		The nation's fifth-largest city and the capital of the Bukhara Region of Uzbekistan. Bukhara has been one of the main centers of Persian civilisation from its early days in the 6th century BC, and, since the 12th century AD, Turkic speakers gradually moved in. Its architecture and archaeological sites form one of the pillars of Central Asian history and art.
Kokand	Uzbekistan	209,389 (2011)		Kokand (Uzbek: Qo'qon, Қўқон; Tajik: Хӯқанд; Persian: خوقند; Chagatai: خوقند; Russian: Коканд) is a city in Fergana Region in eastern Uzbekistan, at the southwestern edge of the Fergana Valley. It has a population of 192,500 (1999 census estimate). Kokand is 228 km southeast of Tashkent, 115 km west of Andijan, and 88 km west of Fergana. It is nicknamed "City of Winds", or sometimes "Town of the Boar".
Samarkand	Uzbekistan	596,300 (2008)		The second largest city in Uzbekistan and the capital of Samarqand Region. The city is most noted for its central position on the Silk Road between China and the West, and for being an Islamic center for scholarly study. It was here that the ruler Ulugh Beg (1394–1449) built a gigantic astronomical observatory.
Tashkent	Uzbekistan	2,571,668 (2020)		The capital and largest city of Uzbekistan. In pre-Islamic and early Islamic times, the town and the region were known as Chach. Tashkent started as an oasis on the Chirchik River, near the foothills of the Golestan Mountains. In ancient times, this area contained Beitian, probably the summer "capital" of the Kangju confederacy.

== Climate ==
Köppen–Geiger climate classification map at 1-km resolution for Central Asia (1991–2020)

Because Central Asia is landlocked and not buffered by a large body of water, temperature fluctuations are often severe, excluding the hot, sunny summer months. In most areas, the climate is dry and continental, with hot summers and cool to cold winters, with occasional snowfall. Outside high-elevation areas, the climate is mostly semi-arid to arid. In lower elevations, summers are hot with blazing sunshine. Winters feature occasional rain or snow from low-pressure systems that cross the area from the Mediterranean Sea. Average monthly precipitation is very low from July to September, rises in autumn (October and November) and is highest in March or April, followed by swift drying in May and June. Winds can be strong, producing dust storms sometimes, especially toward the end of the summer in September and October. Specific cities that exemplify Central Asian climate patterns include Tashkent and Samarkand, Uzbekistan, Ashgabat, Turkmenistan, and Dushanbe, Tajikistan. The last of these represents one of the wettest climates in Central Asia, with an average annual precipitation of over 560 mm (22 inches).

Biogeographically, Central Asia is part of the Palearctic realm. The largest biome in Central Asia is the temperate grasslands, savannas, and shrublands biome. Central Asia also contains the montane grasslands and shrublands, deserts and xeric shrublands and temperate coniferous forests biomes.

=== Climate change ===
2071–2100 Central Asia map under the worst climate change scenario. Mid-range scenarios are currently considered more likely

As of 2022, there has been a scarcity of research on climate impacts in Central Asia, even though it experiences faster warming than the global average and is generally considered to be one of the more climate-vulnerable regions in the world. Along with West Asia, it has already had greater increases in hot temperature extremes than the other parts of Asia, Rainfall in Central Asia had decreased, unlike elsewhere in Asia, and the frequency and intensity of dust storms had grown (partly due to poor land use practices). Droughts have already become more likely, and their likelihood is expected to continue increasing with greater climate change.

== Water ==
Major rivers of the region include the Amu Darya, the Syr Darya, Irtysh, the Hari River and the Murghab River. The five main river basins are the Amu Darya, Syr Darya, Balkhash-Alakol, Ob-Irtysh and Ural basins. Major bodies of water include the Aral Sea and Lake Balkhash. Together with the Caspian Sea, they form part of the huge west-central Asian endorheic system.

The Aral Sea Basin is the region's most important hydrological system, spanning about 1.5 million square kilometres and linking all five post-Soviet Central Asian states through the Amu Darya and Syr Darya river systems.

Water has long shaped the region's economic geography. Around 80% of Central Asia's water use is devoted to irrigation, and the Amu Darya and Syr Darya remain crucial for agriculture across the region.

At the same time, the mountainous upstream states of Kyrgyzstan and Tajikistan control most of the headwaters used for hydropower, while downstream states depend on summer releases for irrigation, creating a long-standing water-energy nexus in regional politics.

In addition to the better-known rivers and lakes, groundwater is an important part of Central Asia's water system. Major aquifers include those in the Aral Sea Basin and the north and south Talas aquifers along the Kazakh-Kyrgyz border.

=== Water scarcity ===
Located deep in the heart of the Eurasian continent, far from oceanic moisture, the region has faced significant challenges accessing and distributing water for several decades, in particular since the dissolution of the Soviet Union.

The Aral Sea and Lake Balkhash have shrunk significantly in recent decades due to the diversion of water from rivers that feed them for irrigation and industrial purposes. The shrinkage of the Aral Sea in particular has become one of the world's best-known environmental disasters, while falling levels in Lake Balkhash and the Caspian Sea have also raised concern.

Climate change is expected to intensify these pressures. Central Asia is warming faster than many other world regions, and the retreat of glaciers in the Tien Shan and Pamir mountains is expected to reduce long-term river flows. By 2050, people in the Amu Darya basin may be faced with severe water scarcity due to both climate and socioeconomic reasons. Some projections anticipate a 10-15% reduction in water resources in the basin by mid-century.

Population growth, inefficient irrigation and rising demand are also expected to worsen water scarcity. Central Asia's regional water deficit could grow by as much as 30% by 2050. World Bank research has further warned that worsening water stress and climate impacts could contribute to large-scale internal migration across Eastern Europe and Central Asia over the coming decades.

The uneven distribution of water resources between the countries has been a recurring source of interstate tension and local conflict. Central Asian states have known for decades that resolving the water deficit issue in the region requires collaboration, and there have been multilateral efforts to do so. The Interstate Commission of Water Coordination (ICWC), for example, was established in 1992 to manage transboundary water resources in the Aral Sea basin. However, a consensus on what needs to be done has proven hard to achieve.

== History ==
Although, during the golden age of Orientalism the place of Central Asia in the world history was marginalised, contemporary historiography has rediscovered the "centrality" of the Central Asia. The history of Central Asia is defined by the area's climate and geography. The aridness of the region made agriculture difficult, and its distance from the sea cut it off from much trade. Thus, few major cities developed in the region; instead, the area was for millennia dominated by the nomadic horse peoples of the steppe.

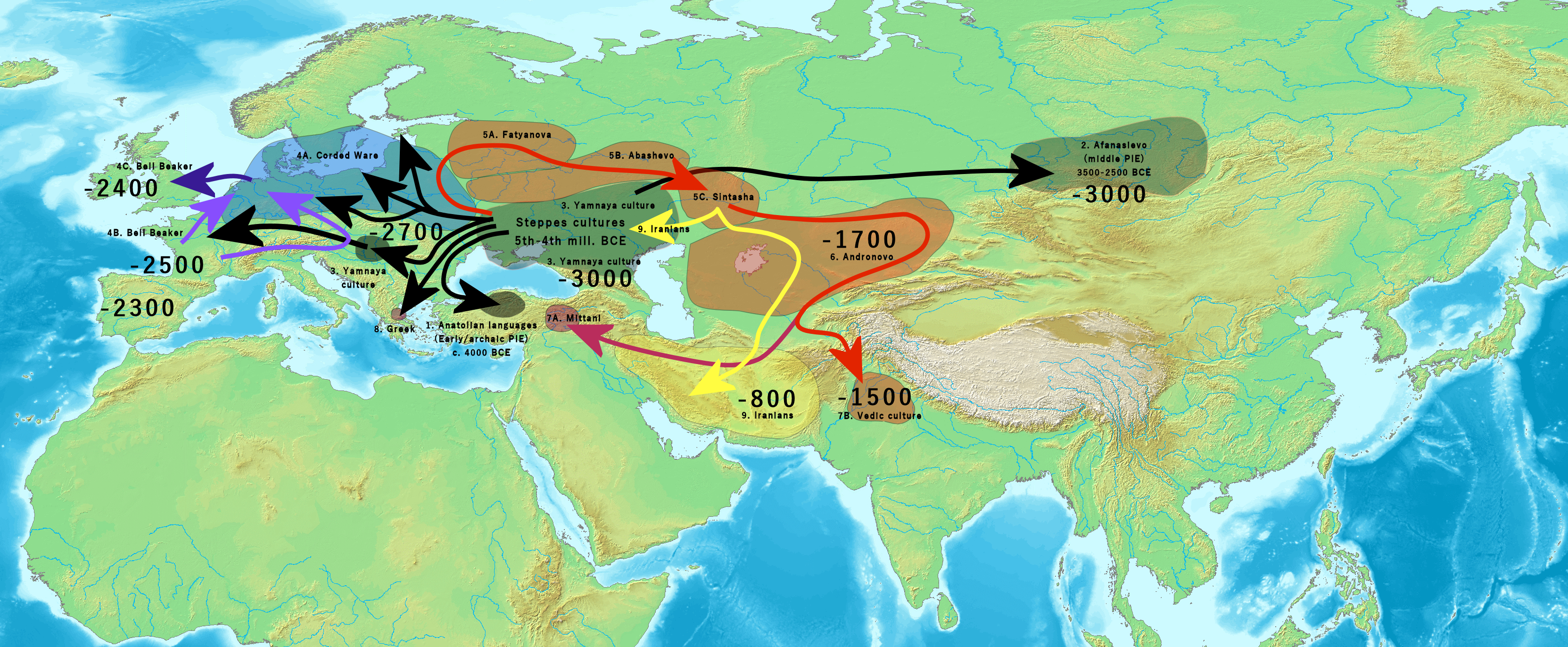
Early Indo-European migrations from the Pontic steppes and across Central Asia. The Andronovo culture existed in Central Asia in the 2nd millennium BC.

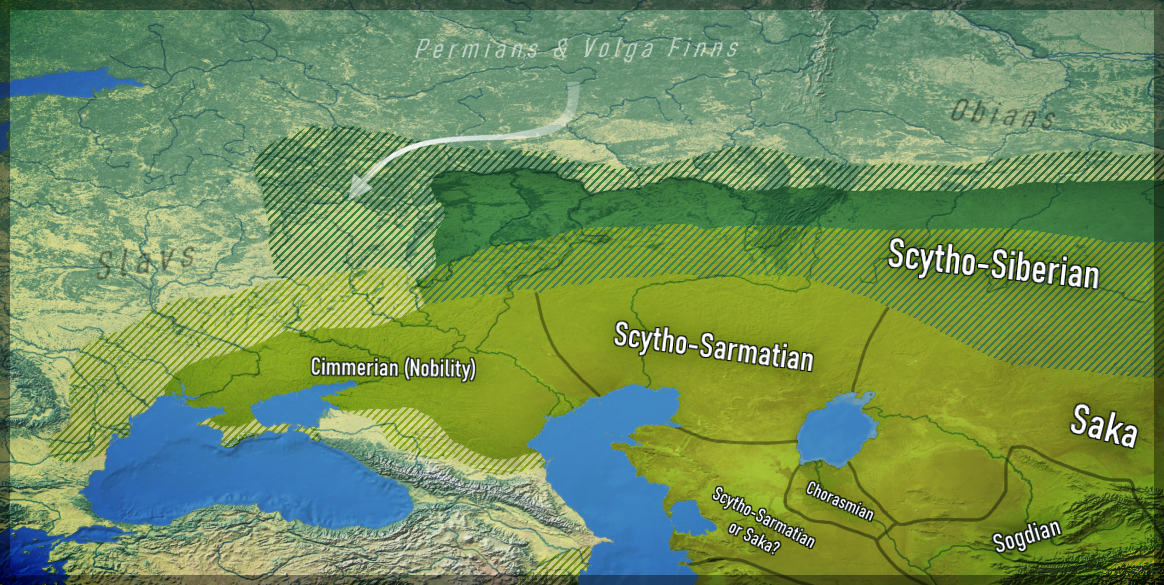
Various Iranic speaking populations in Central Asia during the Iron Age (highlighted in green)

Relations between the steppe nomads and the settled people in and around Central Asia were long marked by conflict. The nomadic lifestyle was well suited to warfare, and the steppe horse riders became some of the most militarily potent people in the world, limited only by their lack of internal unity. Any internal unity that was achieved was most probably due to the influence of the Silk Road, which traveled along Central Asia. Periodically, great leaders or changing conditions would organise several tribes into one force and create an almost unstoppable power. These included the Hun invasion of Europe, the Five Barbarians rebellions in China and most notably the Mongol conquest of much of Eurasia.

The Achaemenid Empire, did make deep inroads into Central Asia by founding cities and gaining control of the trading centres. Alexander the Great's conquests spread Hellenistic civilization all the way to Alexandria Eschate, established in 329 BC. The victory of the Mauryan Empire, under Ashoka The Great, in the Mauro-Seleucid War over the Hellenistic Seleucid Empire led to a brief but influencial Mauryan rule in the region, spreading Indian culture and religions there (mainly Hinduism and Buddhism). Around 250 BC, Bactria seceded from the Seleucid Empire and founded what is now known as the Greco-Bactrian Kingdom, which had extensive contacts with India and China until its end. The Kushan Empire thrived across a wide swath of the region from the 2nd century BC to the 4th century AD while blending Indian, Iranian and Hellenistic culture and traditions. The Gupta Empire also expanded and developed its trade routes with the Central Asian kingdoms and laid the spread of Hinduism, Buddhism and other Dharmic religions in the region.

During pre-Islamic and early Islamic times, Central Asia was inhabited predominantly by speakers of Iranian languages. Among the ancient sedentary Iranian peoples, the Sogdians and Chorasmians played an important role, while Iranian peoples such as Scythians and the later on Alans lived a nomadic or semi-nomadic lifestyle.

The main migration of Turkic peoples occurred between the 6th and 11th centuries, when they spread across most of Central Asia. The Eurasian Steppe slowly transitioned from Indo European and Iranian-speaking groups with dominant West-Eurasian ancestry to a more heterogeneous region with increasing East Asian ancestry through Turkic and Mongolic groups in the past thousands years, including extensive Turkic and later Mongol migrations out of Mongolia and slow assimilation of local populations. In the 8th century AD, the Islamic expansion reached the region but had no significant demographic impact. In the 13th century AD, the Mongol invasion of Central Asia by the Mongol Empire brought most of the region under Mongol influence, which had "enormous demographic success", but did not impact the cultural or linguistic landscape.

=== Invasion routes through Central Asia ===
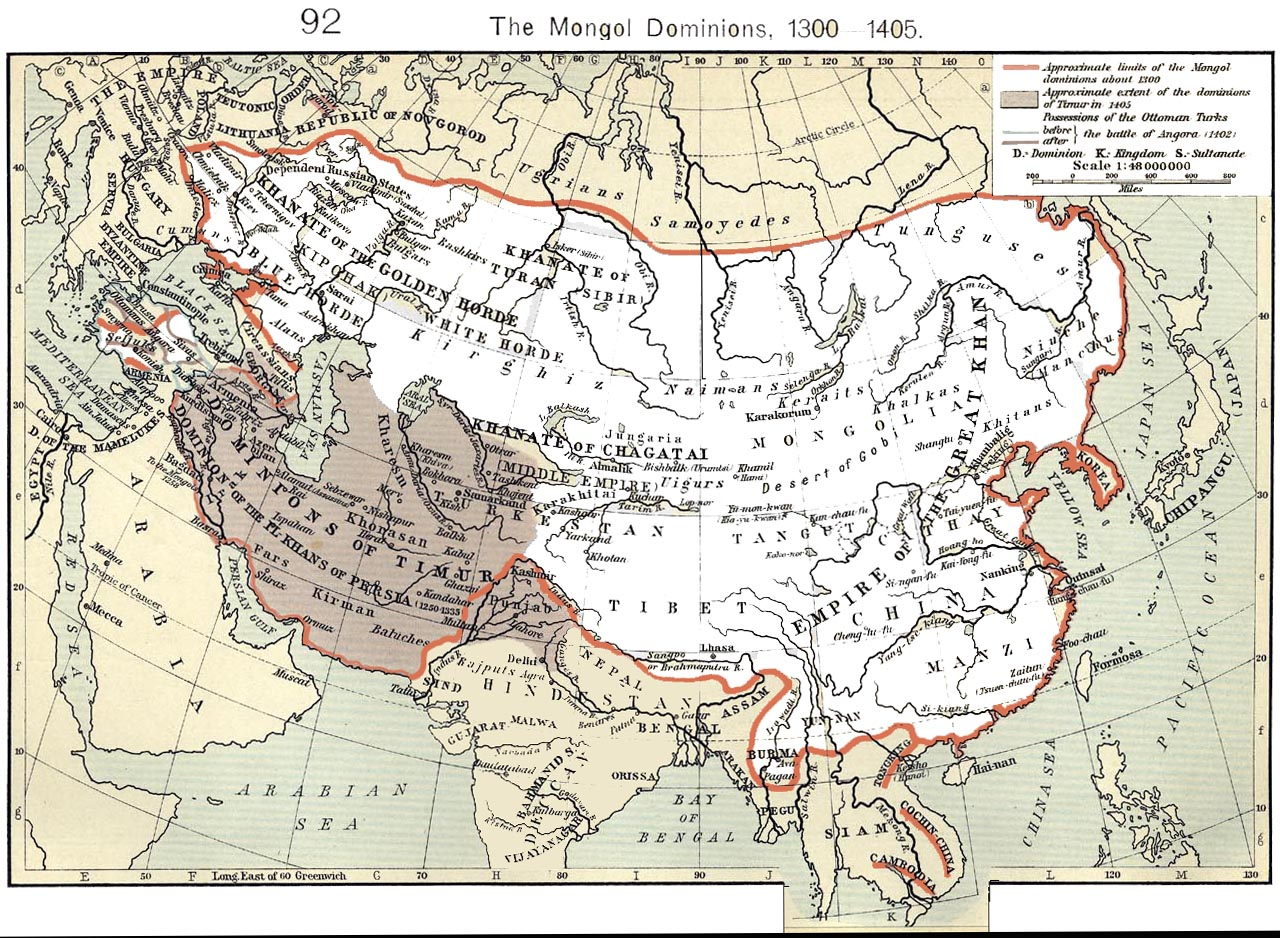
The Mongol Empire at its greatest extent. The gray area is the later Timurid Empire.

Once populated by Iranian peoples and other Indo-European speaking people, Central Asia experienced numerous invasions emanating out of Southern Siberia and Mongolia that would drastically affect the region. Genetic data shows that the different Central Asian Turkic-speaking peoples have between ~22% and ~70% East Asian ancestry (represented by "Baikal hunter-gatherer ancestry" shared with other Northeast Asians and Eastern Siberians), in contrast to Iranian-speaking Central Asians, specifically Tajiks, which display genetic continuity to Indo-Iranians of the Iron Age. Certain Turkic ethnic groups, specifically the Kazakhs, display even higher East Asian ancestry. This is explained by substantial Mongolian influence on the Kazakh genome, through significant admixture between blue eyes, blonde hair, the medieval Kipchaks of Central Asia and the invading medieval Mongolians. The data suggests that the Mongol invasion of Central Asia had lasting impacts onto the genetic makeup of Kazakhs.

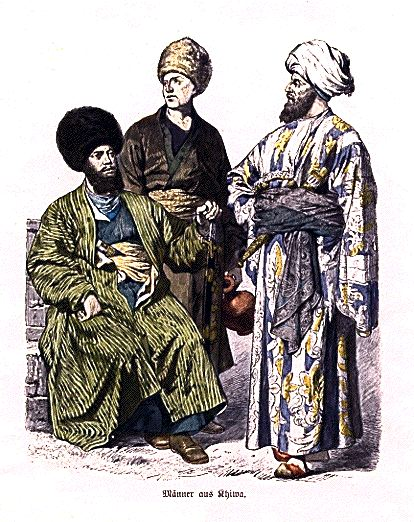
Uzbek men from Khiva, c. 1861–1880

According to recent genetic genealogy testing, the genetic admixture of the Uzbeks clusters somewhere between the Iranian peoples and the Mongols. Another study shows that the Uzbeks are closely related to other Turkic peoples of Central Asia and rather distant from Iranian people. The study also analysed the maternal and paternal DNA haplogroups and shows that Turkic speaking groups are more homogenous than Iranian speaking groups. Genetic studies analyzing the full genome of Uzbeks and other Central Asian populations found that about ~27-60% of the Uzbek ancestry is derived from East Asian sources, with the remainder ancestry (~40–73%) being made up by European and Middle Eastern components. According to a recent study, the Kyrgyz, Kazakhs, Uzbeks, and Turkmens share more of their gene pool with various East Asian and Siberian populations than with West Asian or European populations, though the Turkmens have a large percentage from populations to the east, their main components are Central Asian. The study further suggests that both migration and linguistic assimilation helped to spread the Turkic languages in Eurasia.

=== Medieval to modern history ===
Central Asia in 1636. The Dzungar Khanate was the last great nomadic empire in Central Asia.

The Tang dynasty of China expanded westwards and controlled large parts of Central Asia, directly and indirectly through their Turkic vassals. Tang China actively supported the Turkification of Central Asia, while extending its cultural influence. The Tang Chinese were defeated by the Abbasid Caliphate at the Battle of Talas in 751, marking the end of the Tang dynasty's western expansion and the 150 years of Chinese influence. The Tibetan Empire would take the chance to rule portions of Central Asia and South Asia. During the 13th and 14th centuries, the Mongols conquered and ruled the largest contiguous empire in recorded history. Most of Central Asia fell under the control of the Chagatai Khanate.

The dominance of the nomads ended in the 16th century, as firearms allowed settled peoples to gain control of the region. Russia, China, and other powers expanded into the region and had captured the bulk of Central Asia by the end of the 19th century. The Qing dynasty gained control of East Turkestan in the 18th century as a result of a long struggle with the Dzungars. The Russian Empire conquered the lands of the nomadic Kazakhs, Turkmens, Kyrgyz and Central Asian khanates in the 19th century. A major revolt known as the Dungan Revolt occurred in the 1860s and 1870s in the eastern part of Central Asia, and Qing rule almost collapsed in all of East Turkestan. After the Russian Revolution, the western Central Asian regions were incorporated into the Soviet Union. The eastern part of Central Asia, known as Xinjiang, was incorporated into the People's Republic of China, having been previously ruled by the Qing dynasty and the Republic of China. Mongolia gained its independence from China and has remained independent but became a Soviet satellite state until the dissolution of the Soviet Union. Afghanistan remained relatively independent of major influence by the Soviet Union until the Saur Revolution of 1978.

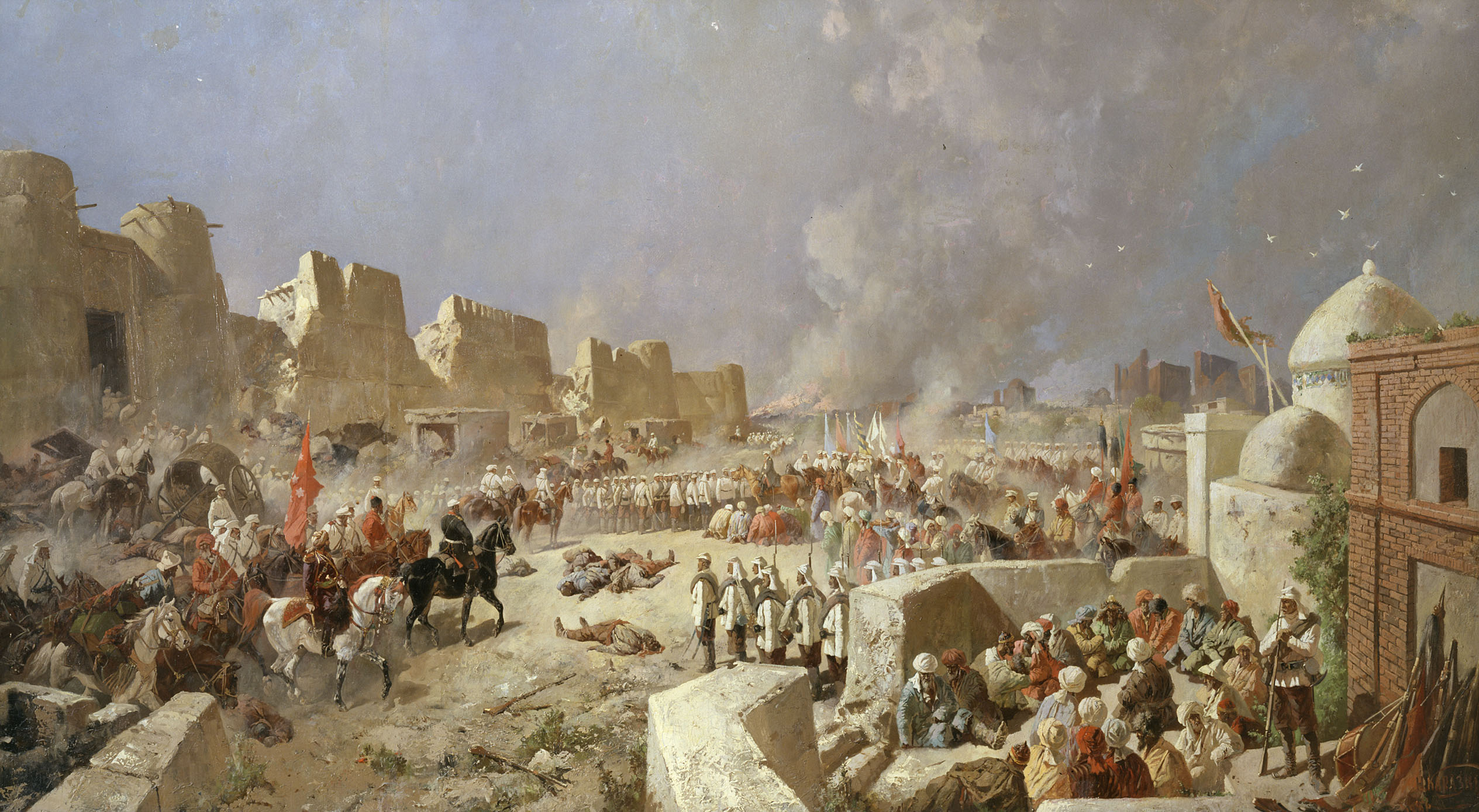
Russian troops taking Samarkand during the Russian conquest of Bukhara, 1868

The Soviet areas of Central Asia saw much industrialisation and construction of infrastructure, but also the suppression of local cultures, hundreds of thousands of deaths from failed collectivisation programmes, and a lasting legacy of ethnic tensions and environmental problems. Soviet authorities deported millions of people, including entire nationalities, from western areas of the Soviet Union to Central Asia and Siberia. According to Touraj Atabaki and Sanjyot Mehendale, "From 1959 to 1970, about two million people from various parts of the Soviet Union migrated to Central Asia, of which about one million moved to Kazakhstan."

=== After the collapse of the Soviet Union ===
With the collapse of the Soviet Union, five countries gained independence: Kazakhstan, Kyrgyzstan, Tajikistan, Turkmenistan, and Uzbekistan. The historian and Turkologist Peter B. Golden explains that without the imperial manipulations of the Russian Empire but above all the Soviet Union, the creation of said republics would have been impossible.

In nearly all the new states, former Communist Party officials retained power as local strongmen. None of the new republics could be considered functional democracies in the early days of independence. Kyrgyzstan, Kazakhstan, and Mongolia later made progress towards more open societies, unlike Uzbekistan, Tajikistan, and Turkmenistan, which have maintained many repressive Soviet-style tactics.

Beginning in the early 2000s, the Chinese government engaged in a series of human rights abuses against Uyghurs and other ethnic and religious minorities in Xinjiang.

== Geopolitics ==
=== Geostrategic location ===
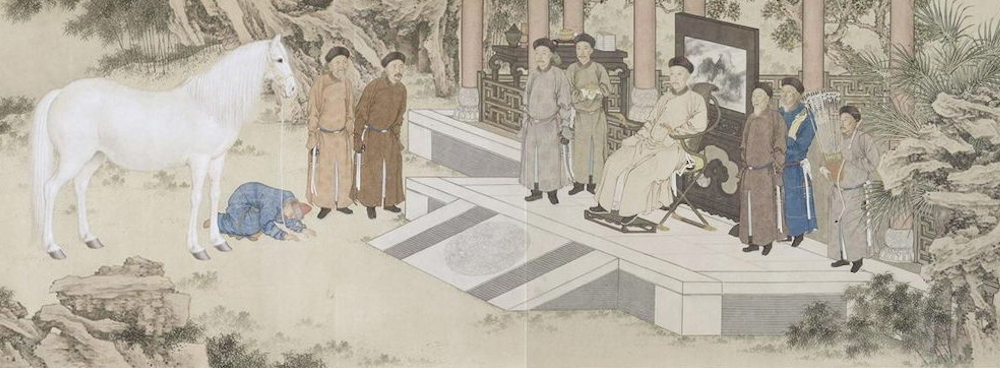
Tartar prostrating before Qianlong Emperor of China (1757).

Central Asia has long been a strategic location merely because of its proximity to several great powers on the Eurasian landmass. The region itself never held a dominant stationary population nor was able to make use of natural resources. Thus, it has rarely throughout history become the seat of power for an empire or influential state. Central Asia has been divided, redivided, conquered out of existence, and fragmented time and time again. Central Asia has served more as the battleground for outside powers than as a power in its own right.

Central Asia had both the advantage and disadvantage of a central location between four historical seats of power. From its central location, it has access to trade routes to and from all the regional powers. On the other hand, it has been continuously vulnerable to attack from all sides throughout its history, resulting in political fragmentation or outright power vacuum, as it is successively dominated.

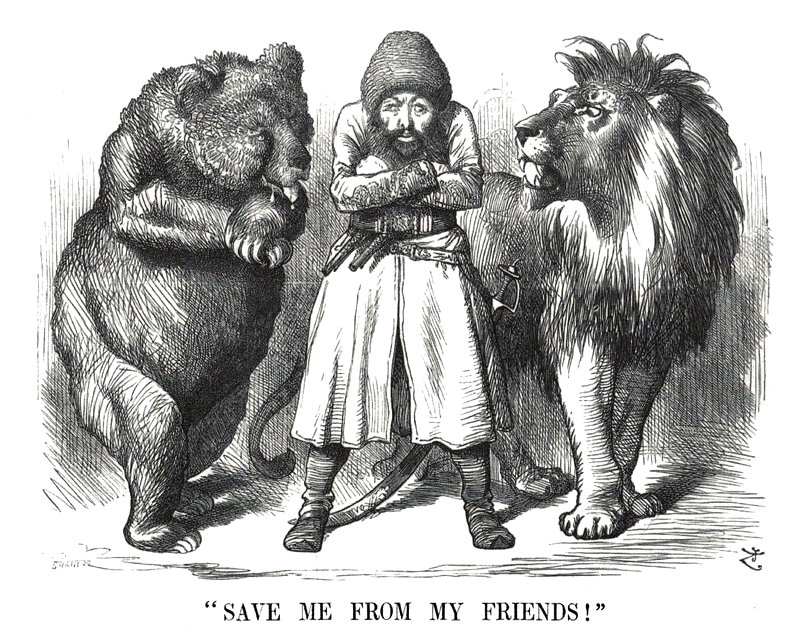
- Political cartoon from the period of the Great Game showing the Afghan Amir Sher Ali with his "friends" Imperial Russia and the United Kingdom (1878)
  To the North, the steppe allowed for rapid mobility, first for nomadic horseback warriors like the Huns and Mongols, and later for Russian traders, eventually supported by railroads. As the Russian Empire expanded to the East, it would also push down into Central Asia towards the sea, in a search for warm water ports. The Soviet Bloc would reinforce dominance from the North and attempt to project power as far south as Afghanistan.
- To the East, the demographic and cultural weight of Chinese empires continually pushed outward into Central Asia since the Silk Road period of Han dynasty. However, with the Sino-Soviet split and collapse of the Soviet Union, China would project its soft power into Central Asia, most notably in the case of Afghanistan, to counter Russian dominance of the region.
- To the Southeast, the demographic and cultural influence of India was felt in Central Asia, notably in Tibet, the Hindu Kush, and slightly beyond. From its base in India, the British Empire competed with the Russian Empire for influence in the region in the 19th and 20th centuries.
- To the Southwest, West Asian powers have expanded into the southern areas of Central Asia (usually Uzbekistan, Afghanistan, and Turkmenistan). Several Persian empires would conquer and reconquer parts of Central Asia; Alexander the Great's Hellenic empire would extend into Central Asia; two Islamic empires would exert substantial influence throughout the region; and the modern state of Iran has projected influence throughout the region as well. Turkey, through a common Turkic nation identity, has gradually increased its ties and influence as well in the region. Furthermore, since Uzbekistan announced their intention to join in April 2018, Turkey and all of the Central Asian Turkic-speaking states except Turkmenistan are together part of the Turkic Council.

=== Influence from neighboring countries ===
In the post–Cold War era, Central Asia is an ethnic cauldron, prone to instability and conflicts, without a sense of national identity, but rather a mess of historical cultural influences, tribal and clan loyalties, and religious fervor. Projecting influence into the area is no longer just Russia, but also Turkey, Iran, China, Japan, Pakistan, India, and the United States:

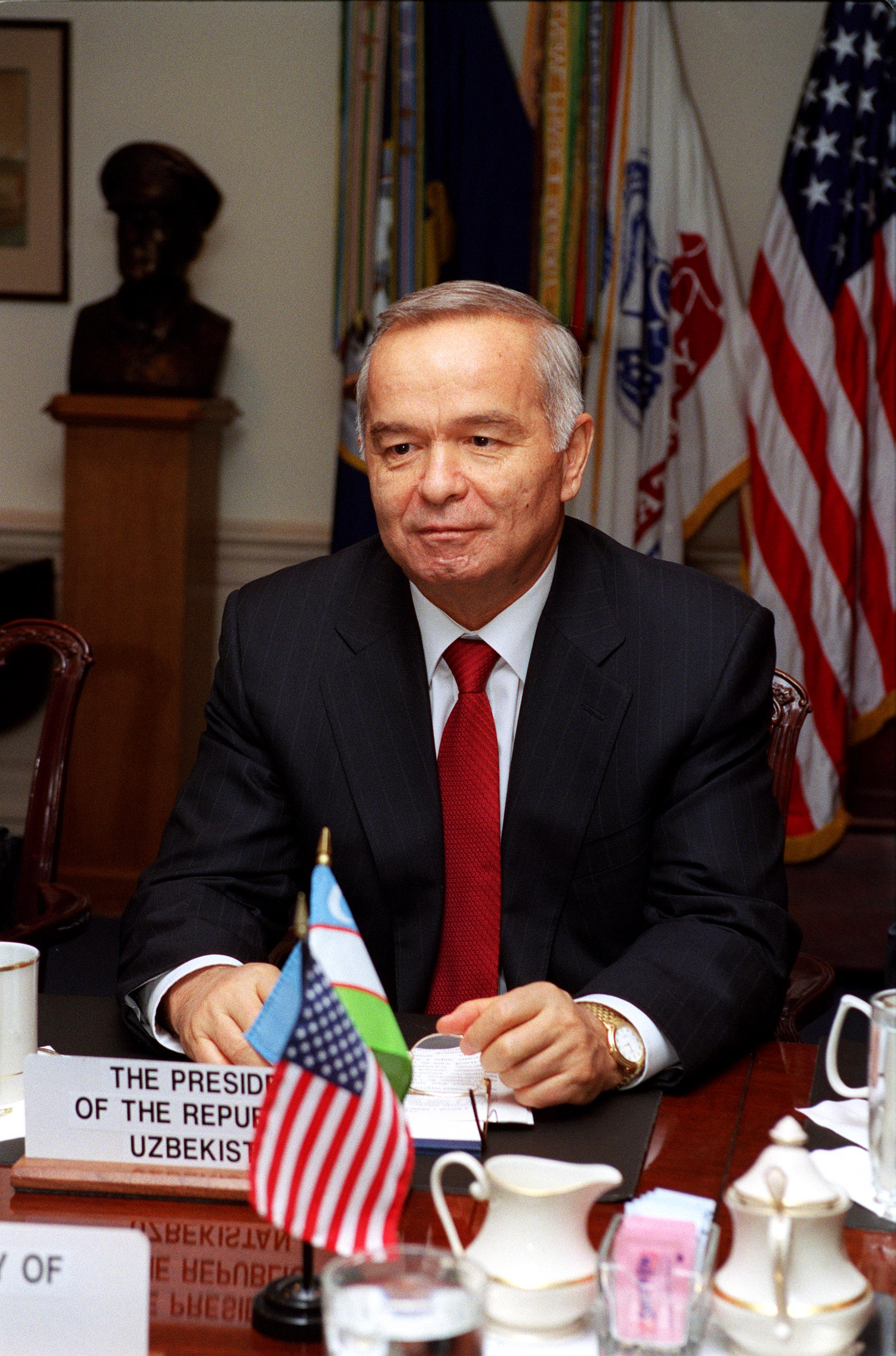
Islam Karimov (President, Uzbekistan) in the Pentagon, March 2002

- Russia continues to dominate political decision-making throughout the former SSRs; although, as other countries move into the area, Russia's influence has begun to wane though Russia still maintains military bases in Kyrgyzstan and Tajikistan.
- The United States, with its military involvement in the region and oil diplomacy, is also significantly involved in the region's politics. The United States and other NATO members were the main contributors to the International Security Assistance Force in Afghanistan during the Islamic Republic period and also exert considerable influence in other Central Asian nations.
- China has security ties with Central Asian states through the Shanghai Cooperation Organisation, and conducts energy trade bilaterally.
- India has geographic proximity to the Central Asian region and, in addition, enjoys considerable influence on Afghanistan. India maintains a military base at Farkhor, Tajikistan, and also has extensive military relations with Kazakhstan and Uzbekistan.
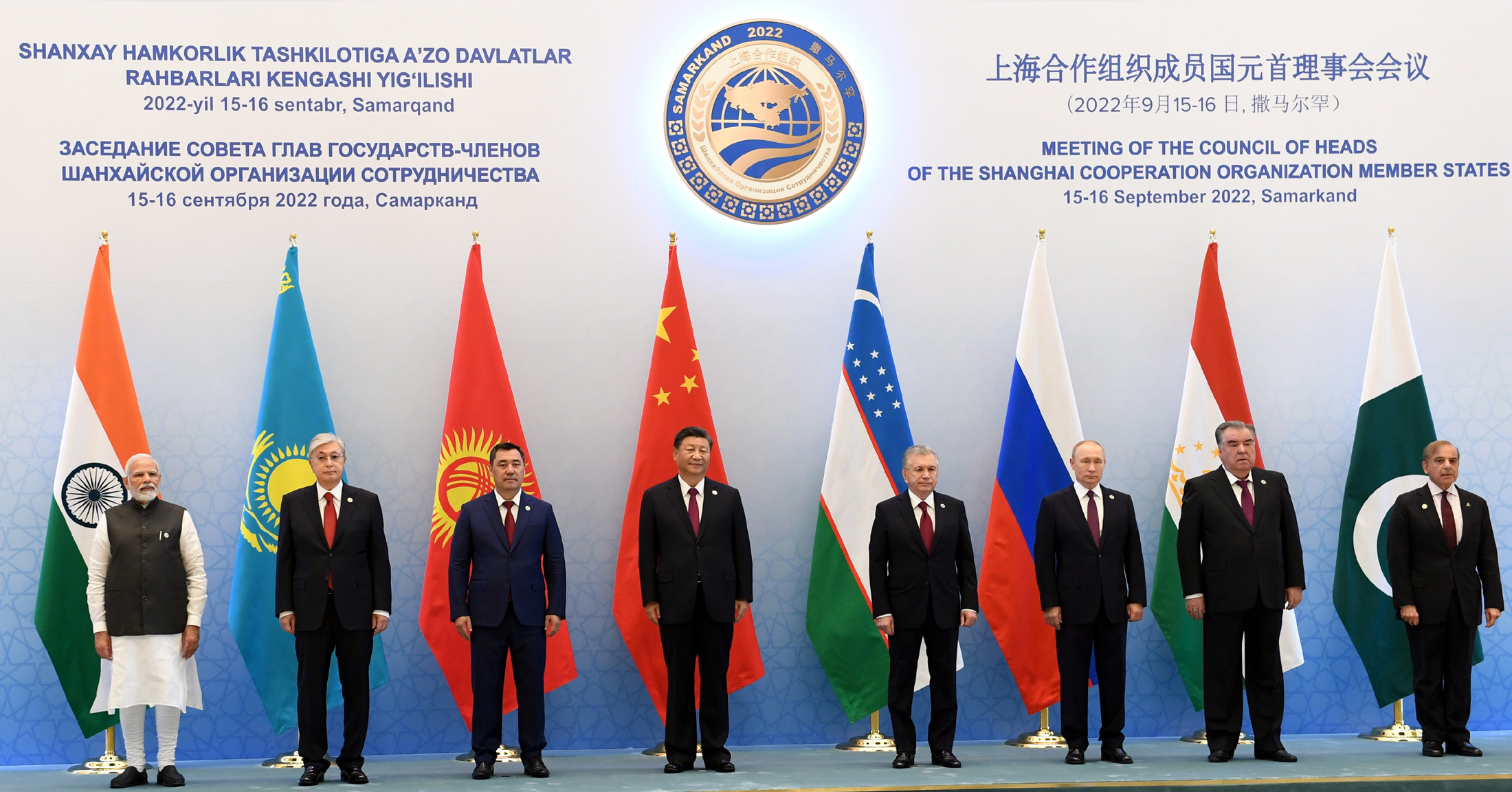
  Leaders present at the SCO summit in Samarkand, Uzbekistan, in 2022
- Turkey also exerts considerable influence in the region on account of its ethnic and linguistic ties with the Turkic peoples of Central Asia and its involvement in the Baku-Tbilisi-Ceyhan oil pipeline. Political and economic relations are growing rapidly (e.g., Turkey recently eliminated visa requirements for citizens of the Central Asian Turkic republics).
- Iran, the seat of historical empires that controlled parts of Central Asia, has historical and cultural links to the region and is vying to construct an oil pipeline from the Caspian Sea to the Persian Gulf.
- Pakistan, a nuclear-armed Islamic state, has a history of political relations with neighbouring Afghanistan and is termed capable of exercising influence. For some Central Asian nations, the shortest route to the ocean lies through Pakistan. Pakistan seeks natural gas from Central Asia and supports the development of pipelines from its countries. According to an independent study, Turkmenistan is supposed to be the fifth largest natural gas field in the world. The mountain ranges and areas in northern Pakistan lie on the fringes of Greater Central Asia; the Gilgit–Baltistan region of Pakistan lies adjacent to Tajikistan, separated only by the narrow Afghan Wakhan Corridor. Being located on the northwest of South Asia, the area forming modern-day Pakistan maintained extensive historical and cultural links with the central Asian region.
- Japan has an important and growing influence in Central Asia, with the master plan of the capital city of Astana in Kazakhstan being designed by Japanese architect Kisho Kurokawa, and the Central Asia plus Japan initiative designed to strengthen ties between them and promote development and stability of the region.

Russian historian Lev Gumilev wrote that Xiongnu, Mongols (Mongol Empire, Zunghar Khanate), and Turkic peoples (First Turkic Khaganate, Uyghur Khaganate) played a role to stop Chinese aggression to the north. The Turkic Khaganate had special policy against Chinese assimilation policy.

The region, along with Russia, is also part of "the great pivot" as per the heartland theory of Halford Mackinder, which says that the power which controls Central Asia—richly endowed with natural resources—shall ultimately be the "empire of the world". For example, the region is endowed with various mineral resources such as chromium, cobalt, zinc, copper, silver, lithium, lead, molybdenum, and many others making it a potential major global supplier of critical materials for clean energy technologies.

== Economy ==
GDP growth trends in Central Asia, 2000–2013. Source: UNESCO Science Report: towards 2030 (2015), Figure 14.1

GDP in Central Asia by economic sector, 2005 and 2013. Source: UNESCO Science Report: towards 2030, Figure 14.2

GDP per capita development in Central Asia, since 1973

Since gaining independence in the early 1990s, the Central Asian republics have gradually been moving from state-controlled economies to market economies. However, reform has been deliberately gradual and selective, as governments strive to limit the social cost and ameliorate living standards. All five countries are implementing structural reforms to improve competitiveness. Kazakhstan is the only CIS country to be included in the 2020 and 2019 IWB World Competitiveness rankings. In particular, they have been modernizing the industrial sector and fostering the development of service industries through business-friendly fiscal policies and other measures, to reduce the share of agriculture in GDP. Between 2005 and 2013, the share of agriculture dropped in all but Tajikistan, where it increased while industry decreased. The fastest growth in industry was observed in Turkmenistan, whereas the services sector progressed most in the other four countries.

Public policies pursued by Central Asian governments focus on buffering the political and economic spheres from external shocks. This includes maintaining a trade balance, minimizing public debt and accumulating national reserves. They cannot totally insulate themselves from negative exterior forces, however, such as the persistently weak recovery of global industrial production and international trade since 2008. Notwithstanding this, they have emerged relatively unscathed from the 2008 financial crisis. Growth faltered only briefly in Kazakhstan, Tajikistan and Turkmenistan and not at all in Uzbekistan, where the economy grew by more than 7% per year on average between 2008 and 2013. Turkmenistan achieved unusually high 14.7% growth in 2011. Kyrgyzstan's performance has been more erratic but this phenomenon was visible well before 2008.

The republics which have fared best benefited from the commodities boom during the first decade of the 2000s. Kazakhstan and Turkmenistan had abundant oil and natural gas reserves and Uzbekistan's own reserves made it more or less self-sufficient. However, by 2026, Uzbekistan was importing about 50% of its oil from Russia, and Kyrgystan even more than 90%, and Tajikistan was also heavily dependent on Russian fuel imports. As a result of the 2025–2026 Russian fuel crisis, the Kremlin imposed a fuel export ban in June 2026, gradually leading to a fuel crisis in most Central Asian countries and rising petrol prices as well, with only Kazakhstan capable of meeting most of its domestic demand.

In the early 21st century, Kyrgyzstan, Tajikistan and Uzbekistan all had gold reserves and Kazakhstan had the world's largest uranium reserves. Fluctuating global demand for cotton, aluminium and other metals (except gold) in the early 2010s hit Tajikistan hardest, since aluminium and raw cotton were its chief exports − the Tajik Aluminium Company was the country's primary industrial asset. In January 2014, the Minister of Agriculture announced the government's intention to reduce the acreage of land cultivated by cotton to make way for other crops. Uzbekistan and Turkmenistan were major cotton exporters themselves, ranking fifth and ninth respectively worldwide for volume in 2014.

Although both exports and imports grew significantly during 2000–2010, Central Asian republics countries remained vulnerable to economic shocks, owing to their reliance on exports of raw materials, a restricted circle of trading partners and a negligible manufacturing capacity. Kyrgyzstan had the added disadvantage of being considered resource poor, although it did have ample water. Most of its electricity was generated by hydropower.

The Kyrgyz economy was shaken by a series of shocks between 2010 and 2012. In April 2010, President Kurmanbek Bakiyev was deposed by a popular uprising, with former minister of foreign affairs Roza Otunbayeva assuring the interim presidency until the election of Almazbek Atambayev in November 2011. Food prices rose two years in a row and, in 2012, production at the major Kumtor gold mine fell by 60% after the site was perturbed by geological movements. According to the World Bank, 33.7% of the population was living in absolute poverty in 2010 and 36.8% a year later.

Despite high rates of economic growth in recent years, GDP per capita in Central Asia was higher than the average for developing countries only in Kazakhstan in 2013 (PPP$23,206) and Turkmenistan (PPP$14 201). It dropped to PPP$5,167 for Uzbekistan, home to 45% of the region's population, and was even lower for Kyrgyzstan and Tajikistan.

In 2018, Kazakhstan was leading the Central Asian region in terms of foreign direct investments. The Kazakh economy accounted for more than 70% of all the investment attracted in Central Asia.

In terms of the economic influence of big powers, China is viewed as one of the key economic players in Central Asia, especially after Beijing launched its grand development strategy known as the Belt and Road Initiative (BRI) in 2013.

The Central Asian countries attracted $378.2 billion of foreign direct investment (FDI) between 2007 and 2019. Kazakhstan accounted for 77.7% of the total FDI directed to the region. Kazakhstan is also the largest country in Central Asia accounting for more than 60 percent of the region's gross domestic product (GDP).

Central Asian nations fared better economically throughout the COVID-19 pandemic. Many variables are likely to have been at play, but disparities in economic structure, the intensity of the pandemic, and accompanying containment efforts may all be linked to part of the variety in nations' experiences. Central Asian countries were, however, in July 2022 expected to be hit the worst in the future. Only 4% of permanently closed businesses anticipated to return in the future, with huge differences across sectors, ranging from 3% in lodging and food services to 27% in retail commerce.

In 2022, experts assessed that global climate change is likely to pose multiple economic risks to Central Asia and may possibly result in many billions of losses unless proper adaptation measures are developed to counter growing temperatures across the region.

== International relations and regional integration ==
=== Multilateral diplomacy and security ===
The five Central Asian republics are members of a range of international and multilateral bodies concerned with peace, security, stability and diplomatic co-operation.

- United Nations (UN): All five countries are full members of the United Nations, which includes almost every sovereign nation in the world.
- Organization for Security and Co-operation in Europe (OSCE): All five republics are participating states alongside 52 other countries from North America, Europe and North Asia.
- Shanghai Cooperation Organisation (SCO): Kazakhstan, Kyrgyzstan, Tajikistan, and Uzbekistan are full members of this organization, alongside China, Russia, India, Pakistan, Iran and Belarus. Turkmenistan typically maintains a policy of neutrality but engages with the SCO.
- Commonwealth of Independent States (CIS): Kazakhstan, Kyrgyzstan, Tajikistan, and Uzbekistan are full members alongside Russia, Armenia, Azerbaijan and Belarus. Turkmenistan also holds associate member status, having moved from permanent membership in 2005.
- Conference on Interaction and Confidence-Building Measures in Asia (CICA): Kazakhstan, Kyrgyzstan, Tajikistan, and Uzbekistan are members alongside 24 other states across Asia and Africa, while Turkmenistan is an observer state.
- Collective Security Treaty Organization (CSTO): Kazakhstan, Kyrgyzstan, and Tajikistan are members along with Russia, Armenia, and Belarus. Uzbekistan and Turkmenistan are not currently members.
- Organization of Turkic States (OTS): Kazakhstan, Kyrgyzstan, and Uzbekistan are full members. Turkmenistan is an observer state.
- Organization of Islamic Cooperation (OIC): All five Central Asian nations are members, along with 52 other countries.

=== Regional economic cooperation ===
Kazakhstan, Kyrgyzstan, and Tajikistan are all members of the World Trade Organization (WTO), while Uzbekistan and Turkmenistan are in the process of joining or hold observer status. All five are also members of the Asian Infrastructure Investment Bank (AIIB).

The Central Asian republics are also members of a number of regional economic organizations, which aim to encourage trade and remove barriers.

- Eurasian Economic Union (EAEU): Kazakhstan and Kyrgyzstan are full members along with Russia, Armenia, and Belarus. Uzbekistan and Tajikistan have engaged in cooperation with the bloc, and Uzbekistan has held observer status since 2020.
- Economic Cooperation Organization (ECO): All five central Asian countries are members, with Turkey, Iran, Pakistan, Afghanistan and Azerbaijan.
- Central Asia Regional Economic Cooperation (CAREC): All five are members of the programme which also includes Afghanistan, Azerbaijan, China, Mongolia and Pakistan. The programme is led by the Asian Development Bank to encourage economic cooperation between members.

These regional groupings have all been set up under the leadership of external power centres like Beijing or Moscow. This is because historically, Central Asian states' economic ties with larger extra-regional neighbours like China or Russia have been of greater significance than ties to their regional neighbours, due to their reliance on trade with these superpowers' economies.

Central Asia remains the only region in the world without its own economic bloc. This lack of cohesion within the region has been described as “an underutilized resource,” which if addressed could provide “a significant boost to socio-economic development and strengthen cooperative relationships between local communities.”

Since the dissolution of the Soviet Union, the Central Asian republics have been conscious of the need for greater regional co-operation and integration between themselves in order to maintain and develop their transport networks and energy, communication and irrigation systems. Only Kazakhstan, Azerbaijan, and Turkmenistan border the Caspian Sea and none of the republics has direct access to an ocean, complicating the transportation of hydrocarbons, in particular, to world markets.

But economic integration has remained limited. There have been attempts to unify the region's economy in the past, like the short-lived Central Asian Union (CAU) which aimed to lower customs barriers and stimulate trade. Despite early enthusiasm, the organization – renamed the Central Asian Cooperation Organization (CACO) in 2001 – was ultimately undermined by the member states' failure to subordinate national interests to regional benefits and enduring leadership rivalries. With the admission of Russia as a member in 2004, the centre of gravity shifted away from Central Asia, and it was eventually merged into the Russian-led Eurasian Economic Community (EurAsEC).

Other initiatives have since been put forward, but efforts for economic integration have typically been dominated by extra-regional superpowers. For example, the Almaty–Bishkek Economic Corridor (ABEC) is a pilot for cross-border integration which aims to reduce travel time, aggregate agricultural produce for wholesale markets and create a single market for health, education, and tourism.

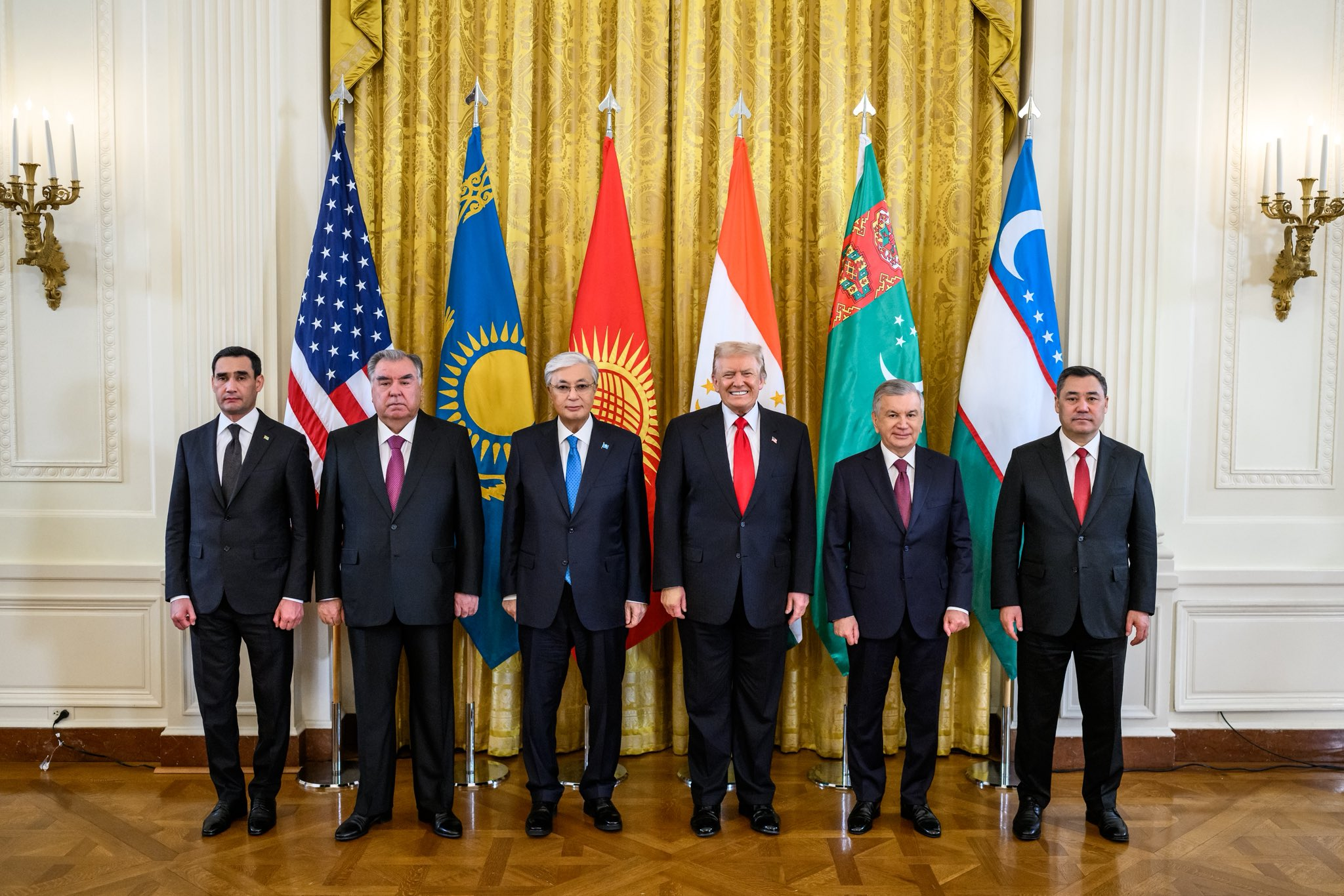
Central Asian foreign ministers at the White House for the C5+1 summit, 6 November 2025

The idea of a Central Asia-only union has regained momentum since the death of Uzbek president Islam Karimov in 2016, and is now back on the table. A proposal for a regional economic grouping called the 'Silk Seven Plus,' has been mooted in the region and is gaining traction in Washington, D.C. The grouping would comprise the five Central Asian republics plus Azerbaijan, Afghanistan and Pakistan, and follow the ASEAN model.

== Education, science, and technology ==
=== Modernisation of research infrastructure ===
Bolstered by strong economic growth in all but Kyrgyzstan, national development strategies are fostering new high-tech industries, pooling resources and orienting the economy towards export markets. Many national research institutions established during the Soviet era have since become obsolete with the development of new technologies and changing national priorities. This has led countries to reduce the number of national research institutions since 2009 by grouping existing institutions to create research hubs. Several of the Turkmen Academy of Sciences's institutes were merged in 2014: the Institute of Botany was merged with the Institute of Medicinal Plants to become the Institute of Biology and Medicinal Plants; the Sun Institute was merged with the Institute of Physics and Mathematics to become the Institute of Solar Energy; and the Institute of Seismology merged with the State Service for Seismology to become the Institute of Seismology and Atmospheric Physics. In Uzbekistan, more than 10 institutions of the Academy of Sciences have been reorganised, following the issuance of a decree by the Cabinet of Ministers in February 2012. The aim is to orient academic research towards problem-solving and ensure continuity between basic and applied research. For example, the Mathematics and Information Technology Research Institute has been subsumed under the National University of Uzbekistan and the Institute for Comprehensive Research on Regional Problems of Samarkand has been transformed into a problem-solving laboratory on environmental issues within Samarkand State University. Other research institutions have remained attached to the Uzbek Academy of Sciences, such as the Centre of Genomics and Bioinformatics.

Kazakhstan and Turkmenistan are also building technology parks as part of their drive to modernise infrastructure. In 2011, construction began of a technopark in the village of Bikrova near Ashgabat, the Turkmen capital. It will combine research, education, industrial facilities, business incubators and exhibition centres. The technopark will house research on alternative energy sources (sun, wind) and the assimilation of nanotechnologies. Between 2010 and 2012, technological parks were set up in the east, south and north Kazakhstan oblasts (administrative units) and in the capital, Astana. A Centre for Metallurgy was also established in the east Kazakhstan oblast, as well as a Centre for Oil and Gas Technologies which will be part of the planned Caspian Energy Hub. In addition, the Centre for Technology Commercialisation has been set up in Kazakhstan as part of the Parasat National Scientific and Technological Holding, a joint stock company established in 2008 that is 100% state-owned. The centre supports research projects in technology marketing, intellectual property protection, technology licensing contracts and start-ups. The centre plans to conduct a technology audit in Kazakhstan and to review the legal framework regulating the commercialisation of research results and technology.

Trends in research expenditure in Central Asia, as a percentage of GDP, 2001–2013. Source: UNESCO Science Report: 2030 (2015), Figure 14.3

Countries are seeking to augment the efficiency of traditional extractive sectors but also to make greater use of information and communication technologies and other modern technologies, such as solar energy, to develop the business sector, education and research. In March 2013, two research institutes were created by presidential decree to foster the development of alternative energy sources in Uzbekistan, with funding from the Asian Development Bank and other institutions: the SPU Physical−Technical Institute (Physics Sun Institute) and the International Solar Energy Institute. Three universities have been set up since 2011 to foster competence in strategic economic areas: Nazarbayev University in Kazakhstan (first intake in 2011), an international research university, Inha University in Uzbekistan (first intake in 2014), specializing in information and communication technologies, and the International Oil and Gas University in Turkmenistan (founded in 2013). Kazakhstan and Uzbekistan are both generalizing the teaching of foreign languages at school, in order to facilitate international ties. Kazakhstan and Uzbekistan have both adopted the three-tier bachelor's, master's and PhD degree system, in 2007 and 2012 respectively, which is gradually replacing the Soviet system of Candidates and Doctors of Science. In 2010, Kazakhstan became the only Central Asian member of the Bologna Process, which seeks to harmonise higher education systems in order to create a European Higher Education Area.

=== Financial investment in research ===
The Central Asian republics' ambition of developing the business sector, education and research is being hampered by chronic low investment in research and development. Over the decade to 2013, the region's investment in research and development hovered around 0.2–0.3% of GDP. Uzbekistan broke with this trend in 2013 by raising its own research intensity to 0.41% of GDP.

Kazakhstan is the only country where the business enterprise and private non-profit sectors make any significant contribution to research and development – but research intensity overall is low in Kazakhstan: just 0.18% of GDP in 2013. Moreover, few industrial enterprises conduct research in Kazakhstan. Only one in eight (12.5%) of the country's manufacturing firms were active in innovation in 2012, according to a survey by the UNESCO Institute for Statistics. Enterprises prefer to purchase technological solutions that are already embodied in imported machinery and equipment. Just 4% of firms purchase the license and patents that come with this technology. Nevertheless, there appears to be a growing demand for the products of research, since enterprises spent 4.5 times more on scientific and technological services in 2008 than in 1997.

=== Trends in researchers ===
Central Asian researchers by sector of employment (HC), 2013. Source: UNESCO Science Report: towards 2030 (2015), Figure 14.5

Kazakhstan and Uzbekistan count the highest researcher density in Central Asia. The number of researchers per million population is close to the world average (1,083 in 2013) in Kazakhstan (1,046) and higher than the world average in Uzbekistan (1,097).

Kazakhstan is the only Central Asian country where the business enterprise and private non-profit sectors make any significant contribution to research and development. Uzbekistan is in a particularly vulnerable position, with its heavy reliance on higher education: three-quarters of researchers were employed by the university sector in 2013 and just 6% in the business enterprise sector. With most Uzbek university researchers nearing retirement, this imbalance imperils Uzbekistan's research future. Almost all holders of a Candidate of Science, Doctor of Science or PhD are more than 40 years old and half are aged over 60; more than one in three researchers (38.4%) holds a PhD degree, or its equivalent, the remainder holding a bachelor's or master's degree.

Central Asian researchers by field of science, 2013. Source: UNESCO Science Report: towards 2030 (2015), Figure 14.4

Kazakhstan, Kyrgyzstan, and Uzbekistan have all maintained a share of women researchers above 40% since the fall of the Soviet Union. Kazakhstan has even achieved gender parity, with Kazakh women dominating medical and health research and representing some 45–55% of engineering and technology researchers in 2013. In Tajikistan, however, only one in three scientists (34%) was a woman in 2013, down from 40% in 2002. Although policies are in place to give Tajik women equal rights and opportunities, these are underfunded and poorly understood. Turkmenistan has offered a state guarantee of equality for women since a law adopted in 2007 but the lack of available data makes it impossible to draw any conclusions as to the law's impact on research. As for Turkmenistan, it does not make data available on higher education, research expenditure or researchers.

PhDs obtained in science and engineering in Central Asia, 2013 or closest year (UNESCO Science Report: towards 2030 (2015), Table 14.1)
	PhDs		PhDs in science				PhDs in engineering			
	Total	Women (%)	Total	Women (%)	Total	Women	Total	Women (%)	Total	Women
	Total	Women (%)	Total	Women (%)	Per million pop.		Total	Women (%)	Per million pop.	
Kazakhstan (2013)	247	51	73	60	4.4	2.7	37	38	2.3	0.9
Kyrgyzstan (2012)	499	63	91	63	16.6	10.4	54	63	–	–
Tajikistan (2012)	331	11	31	–	3.9	–	14	–	–	–
Uzbekistan (2011)	838	42	152	30	5.4	1.6	118	27.0		

Note: PhD graduates in science cover life sciences, physical sciences, mathematics and statistics, and computing; PhDs in engineering also cover manufacturing and construction. For Central Asia, the generic term of PhD also encompasses Candidate of Science and Doctor of Science degrees. Data are unavailable for Turkmenistan.

Central Asian researchers by field of science and gender, 2013 or closest year (UNESCO Science Report: towards 2030 (2015), Table 14.1)
	Total researchers (head counts)				Researchers by field of science (head counts)											
	Total researchers (head counts)				Natural Sciences		Engineering and technology		Medical and health sciences		Agricultural sciences		Social sciences		Humanities	
	Total	Per million pop.	Number of women	Women (%)	Total	Women (%)	Total	Women (%)	Total	Women (%)	Total	Women (%)	Total	Women (%)	Total	Women (%)
Kazakhstan (2013)	17,195	1,046	8,849	51.5	5,091	51.9	4,996	44.7	1,068	69.5	2,150	43.4	1,776	61.0	2 114	57.5
Kyrgyzstan (2011)	2,224	412	961	43.2	593	46.5	567	30.0	393	44.0	212	50.0	154	42.9	259	52.1
Tajikistan (2013)	2,152	262	728	33.8	509	30.3	206	18.0	374	67.6	472	23.5	335	25.7	256	34.0
Uzbekistan (2011)	30,890	1,097	12,639	40.9	6,910	35.3	4,982	30.1	3,659	53.6	1,872	24.8	6,817	41.2	6,650	52.0

=== Research output ===
Scientific publications from Central Asia catalogued by Thomson Reuters' Web of Science, Science Citation Index Expanded, 2005–2014, UNESCO Science Report: towards 2030 (2015), Figure 14.6

The number of scientific papers published in Central Asia grew by almost 50% between 2005 and 2014, driven by Kazakhstan, which overtook Uzbekistan over this period to become the region's most prolific scientific publisher, according to Thomson Reuters' Web of Science (Science Citation Index Expanded). Between 2005 and 2014, Kazakhstan's share of scientific papers from the region grew from 35% to 56%. Although two-thirds of papers from the region have a foreign co-author, the main partners tend to come from beyond Central Asia, namely the Russian Federation, USA, German, United Kingdom and Japan.

Five Kazakh patents were registered at the US Patent and Trademark Office between 2008 and 2013, compared to three for Uzbek inventors and none at all for the other three Central Asian republics, Kyrgyzstan, Tajikistan, and Turkmenistan.

Cumulative total of articles by Central Asians between 2008 and 2013, by field of science. Source: UNESCO Science Report: towards 2030 (2015), Figure 14.6

Kazakhstan is Central Asia's main trader in high-tech products. Kazakh imports nearly doubled between 2008 and 2013, from US$2.7 billion to US$5.1 billion. There has been a surge in imports of computers, electronics and telecommunications; these products represented an investment of US$744 million in 2008 and US$2.6 billion five years later. The growth in exports was more gradual – from US$2.3 billion to US$3.1 billion – and dominated by chemical products (other than pharmaceuticals), which represented two-thirds of exports in 2008 (US$1.5 billion) and 83% (US$2.6 billion) in 2013.

=== International cooperation in science and technology ===
The Central Asian states are also co-operating in the field of science and technology. For example, the Eurasian Economic Union is expected to encourage business ties and scientific mobility, since it includes provision for the free circulation of labour and unified patent regulations.

Kazakhstan and Tajikistan participated in the Innovative Biotechnologies Programme (2011–2015) launched by the Eurasian Economic Community, the predecessor of the Eurasian Economic Union, The programme also involved Belarus and the Russian Federation. Within this programme, prizes were awarded at an annual bio-industry exhibition and conference. In 2012, 86 Russian organisations participated, plus three from Belarus, one from Kazakhstan and three from Tajikistan, as well as two scientific research groups from Germany. At the time, Vladimir Debabov, scientific director of the Genetika State Research Institute for Genetics and the Selection of Industrial Micro-organisms in the Russian Federation, stressed the paramount importance of developing bio-industry. "In the world today, there is a strong tendency to switch from petrochemicals to renewable biological sources", he said. "Biotechnology is developing two to three times faster than chemicals."

Kazakhstan also participated in a second project of the Eurasian Economic Community, the establishment of the Centre for Innovative Technologies on 4 April 2013, with the signing of an agreement between the Russian Venture Company (a government fund of funds), the Kazakh JSC National Agency and the Belarusian Innovative Foundation. Each of the selected projects is entitled to funding of US$3–90 million and is implemented within a public–private partnership. The first few approved projects focused on supercomputers, space technologies, medicine, petroleum recycling, nanotechnologies and the ecological use of natural resources. Once these initial projects have spawned viable commercial products, the venture company plans to reinvest the profits in new projects. This venture company is not a purely economic structure; it has also been designed to promote a common economic space among the three participating countries. Kazakhstan recognises the role civil society initiatives have to address the consequences of the COVID-19 crisis.

Four of the five Central Asian republics have also been involved in a project launched by the European Union in September 2013, IncoNet CA. The aim of this project is to encourage Central Asian countries to participate in research projects within Horizon 2020, the European Union's eighth research and innovation funding programme. The focus of this research projects is on three societal challenges considered as being of mutual interest to both the European Union and Central Asia, namely: climate change, energy and health. IncoNet CA builds on the experience of earlier projects which involved other regions, such as Eastern Europe, the South Caucasus and the Western Balkans. IncoNet CA focuses on twinning research facilities in Central Asia and Europe. It involves a consortium of partner institutions from Austria, the Czech Republic, Estonia, Germany, Hungary, Kazakhstan, Kyrgyzstan, Poland, Portugal, Tajikistan, Turkey and Uzbekistan. In May 2014, the European Union launched a 24-month call for project applications from twinned institutions – universities, companies and research institutes – for funding of up to €10,000 to enable them to visit one another's facilities to discuss project ideas or prepare joint events like workshops.

The International Science and Technology Center (ISTC) was established in 1992 by the European Union, Japan, the Russian Federation and the US to engage weapons scientists in civilian research projects and to foster technology transfer. ISTC branches have been set up in the following countries party to the agreement: Armenia, Belarus, Georgia, Kazakhstan, Kyrgyzstan and Tajikistan. The headquarters of ISTC were moved to Nazarbayev University in Kazakhstan in June 2014, three years after the Russian Federation announced its withdrawal from the centre.

== Culture ==
=== Arts ===
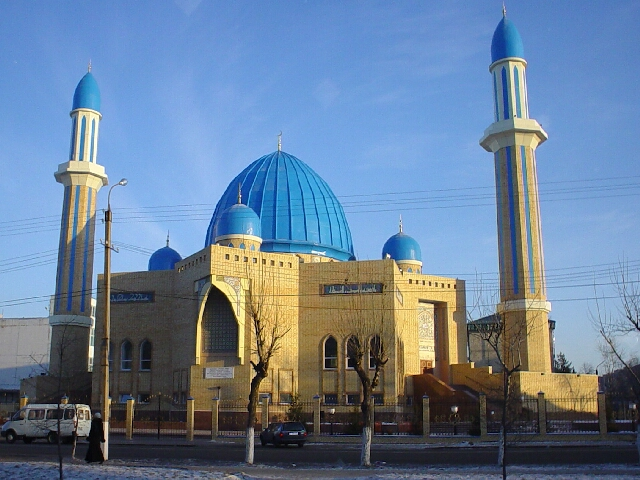
Mosque in Petropavlovsk, Kazakhstan

At the crossroads of Asia, shamanistic practices live alongside Buddhism. Thus, Yama, Lord of Death, was revered in Tibet as a spiritual guardian and judge. Mongolian Buddhism, in particular, was influenced by Tibetan Buddhism. The Qianlong Emperor of Qing China in the 18th century was Tibetan Buddhist and would sometimes travel from Beijing to other cities for personal religious worship.

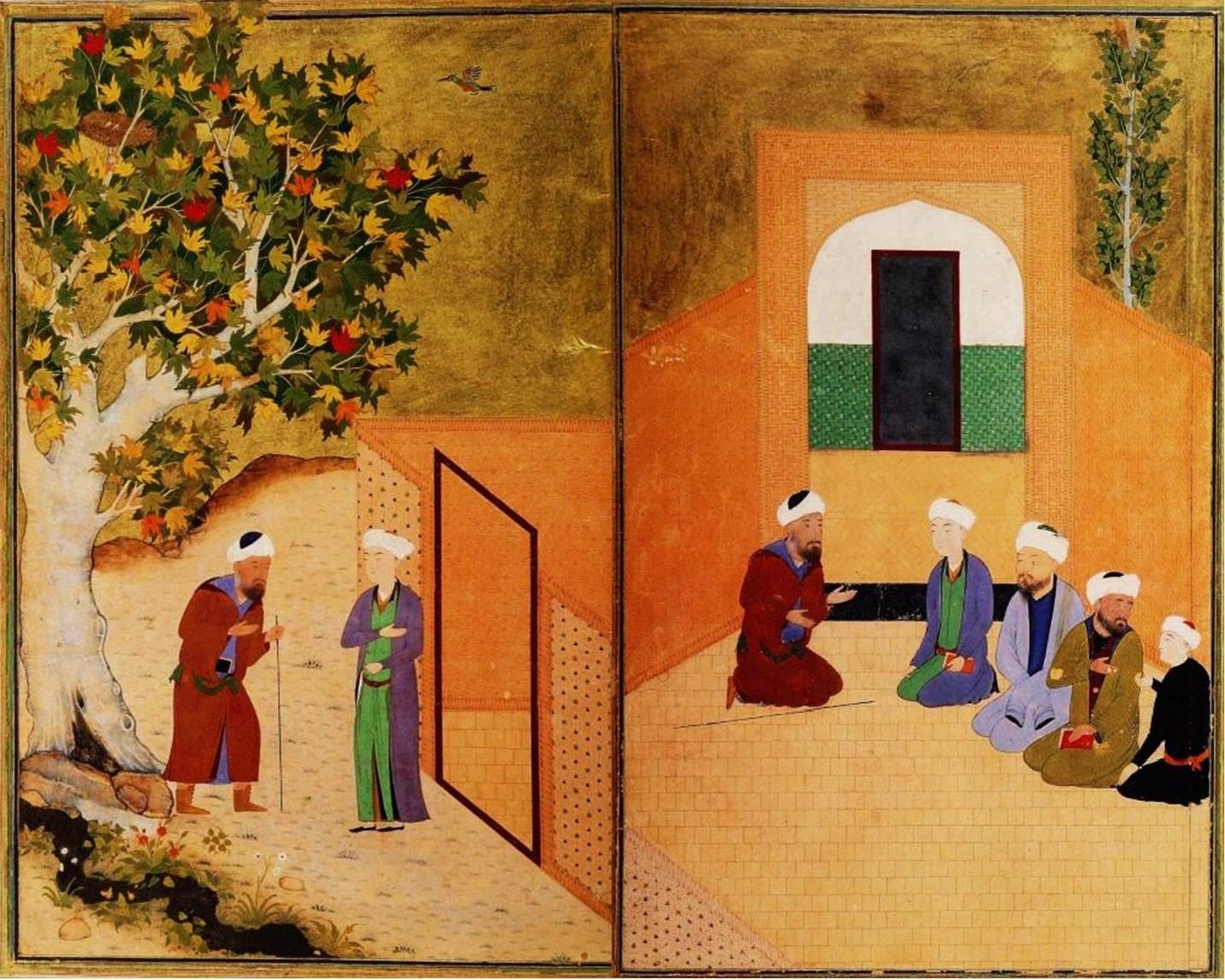
Saadi Shirazi is welcomed by a youth from Kashgar during a forum in Bukhara.

Central Asia also has an indigenous form of improvisational oral poetry that is over 1000 years old. It is principally practiced in Kyrgyzstan and Kazakhstan by akyns, lyrical improvisationalists. They engage in lyrical battles, the aytysh or the alym sabak. The tradition arose out of early bardic oral historians. They are usually accompanied by a stringed instrument—in Kyrgyzstan, a three-stringed komuz, and in Kazakhstan, a similar two-stringed instrument, the dombra.

Photography in Central Asia began to develop after 1882, when a Russian Mennonite photographer named Wilhelm Penner moved to the Khanate of Khiva during the Mennonite migration to Central Asia led by Claas Epp, Jr. Upon his arrival to Khanate of Khiva, Penner shared his photography skills with a local student Khudaybergen Divanov, who later became the founder of Uzbek photography.

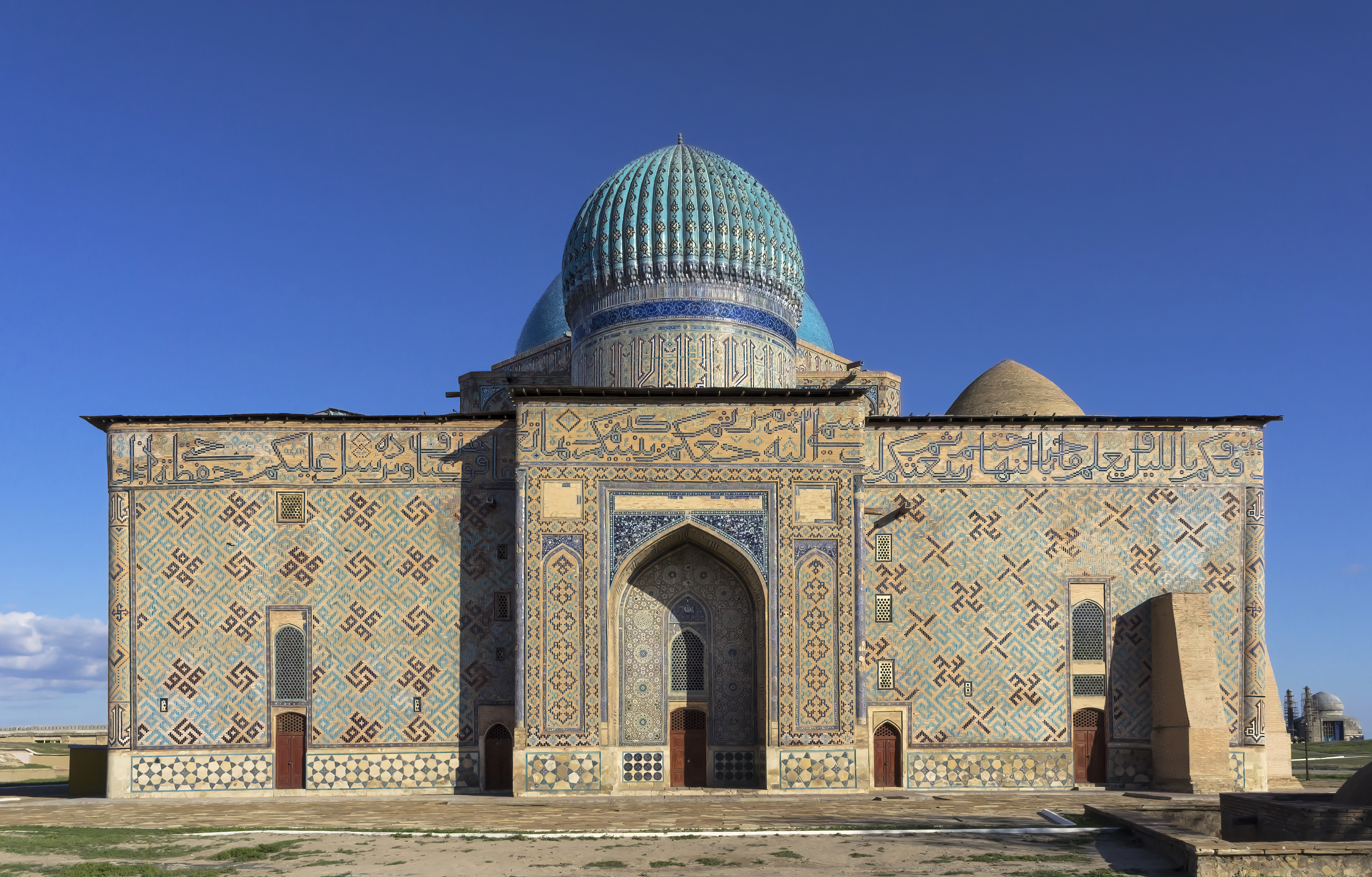
Mausoleum of Khoja Ahmed Yasawi in Hazrat-e Turkestan, Kazakhstan. Timurid architecture consisted of Persian art.

Some also learn to sing the Manas, Kyrgyzstan's epic poem (those who learn the Manas exclusively but do not improvise are called manaschis). During Soviet rule, akyn performance was co-opted by the authorities and subsequently declined in popularity. With the fall of the Soviet Union, it has enjoyed a resurgence, although akyns still do use their art to campaign for political candidates. A 2005 The Washington Post article proposed a similarity between the improvisational art of akyns and modern freestyle rap performed in the West.

As a consequence of Russian colonisation, European fine arts – painting, sculpture and graphics – have developed in Central Asia. The first years of the Soviet regime saw the appearance of modernism, which took inspiration from the Russian avant-garde movement. Until the 1980s, Central Asian arts had developed along with general tendencies of Soviet arts. In the 1990s, arts of the region underwent some significant changes. Institutionally speaking, some fields of arts were regulated by the birth of the art market, some stayed as representatives of official views, while many were sponsored by international organisations. The years of 1990–2000 were times for the establishment of contemporary arts. In the region, many important international exhibitions are taking place, Central Asian art is represented in European and American museums, and the Central Asian Pavilion at the Venice Biennale has been organised since 2005.

=== Sports ===
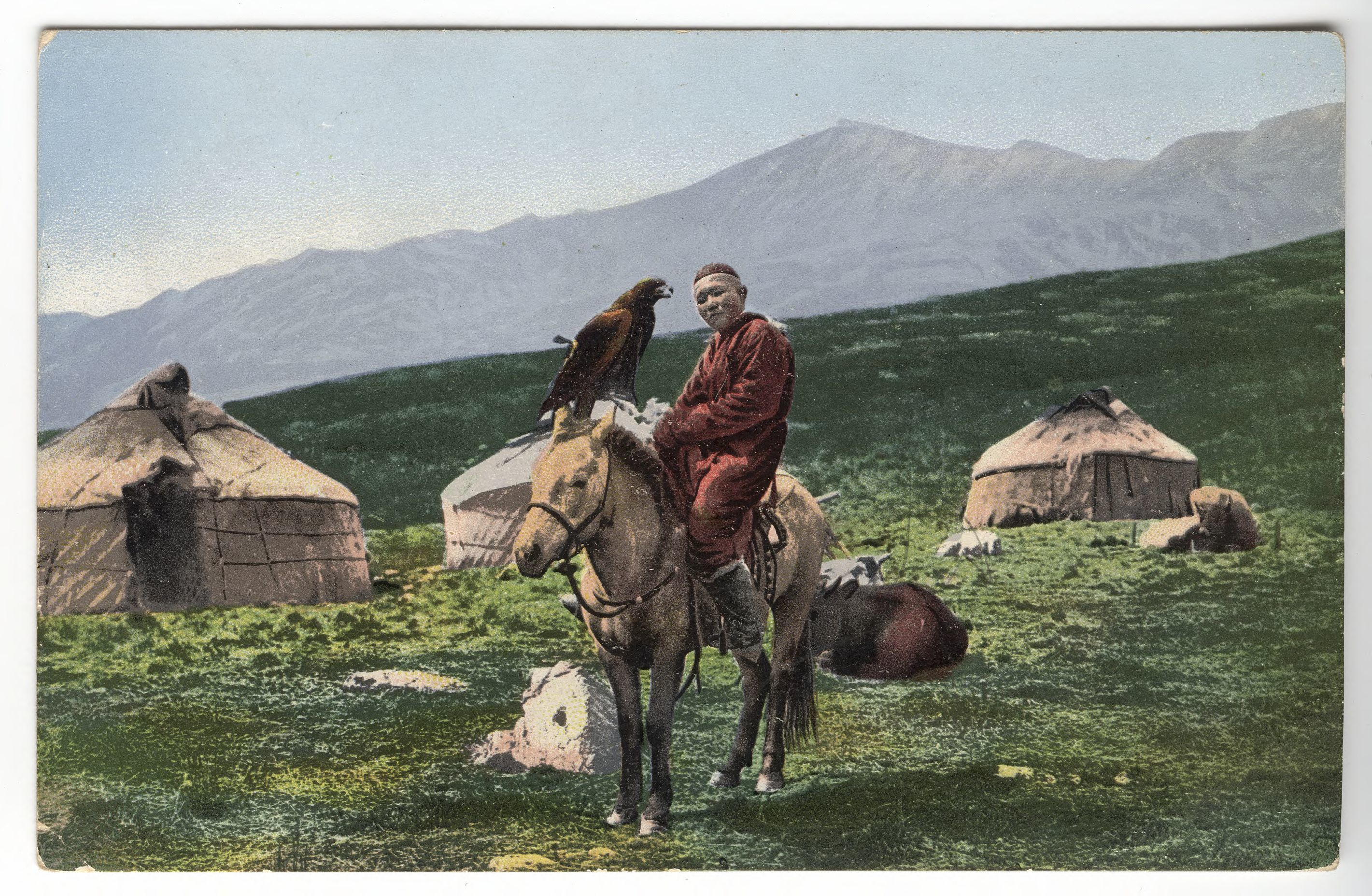
Kazakh man on a horse with golden eagle

Equestrian sports are traditional in Central Asia, with disciplines like endurance riding, buzkashi, dzhigit, and kyz kuu. The traditional game of buzkashi is played throughout the Central Asian region, the countries sometimes organise buzkashi competition amongst each other. The first regional competition among the Central Asian countries, Russia, Chinese Xinjiang, and Turkey was held in 2013. The first world title competition was played in 2017 and won by Kazakhstan.

Association football is popular across Central Asia. Most countries are members of the Central Asian Football Association, a region of the Asian Football Confederation. However, Kazakhstan is a member of the UEFA.

Wrestling is popular across Central Asia, with Kazakhstan having claimed 14 Olympic medals, Uzbekistan seven, and Kyrgyzstan three. As former Soviet states, Central Asian countries have been successful in gymnastics.

Mixed Martial Arts is one of more common sports in Central Asia, Kyrgyz athlete Valentina Shevchenko holding the UFC Flyweight Champion title.

Cricket is the most popular sport in Afghanistan. The Afghanistan national cricket team, first formed in 2001, has claimed wins over Bangladesh, West Indies and Zimbabwe.

Notable Kazakh competitors include cyclists Alexander Vinokourov and Andrey Kashechkin, boxer Vassiliy Jirov and Gennady Golovkin, runner Olga Shishigina, decathlete Dmitriy Karpov, gymnast Aliya Yussupova, judoka Askhat Zhitkeyev and Maxim Rakov, skier Vladimir Smirnov, weightlifter Ilya Ilyin, and figure skaters Denis Ten and Elizabet Tursynbaeva.

Notable Uzbekistani competitors include cyclist Djamolidine Abdoujaparov, boxer Ruslan Chagaev, canoer Michael Kolganov, gymnast Oksana Chusovitina, tennis player Denis Istomin, chess player Rustam Kasimdzhanov, and figure skater Misha Ge.

== Demographics ==
Population pyramid of Central Asia in 2023

Ethnic map of Central Asia. White areas are thinly-populated semi-desert. The three northwest-tending lines are the Syr Darya and Amu Darya Rivers flowing from the eastern mountains into the Aral Sea and in the south the irrigated north side of the Kopet Dagh mountains.

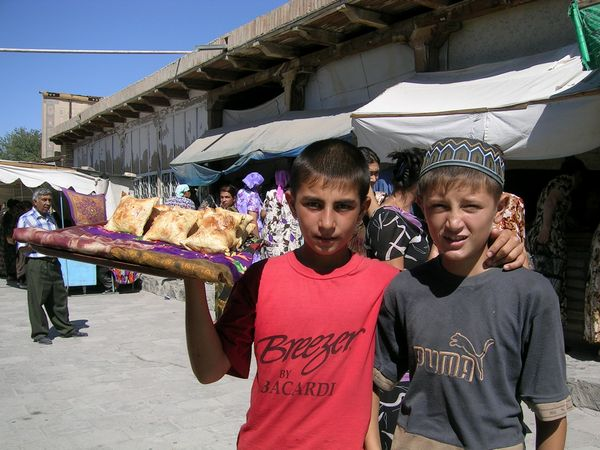
Uzbek children in Samarkand

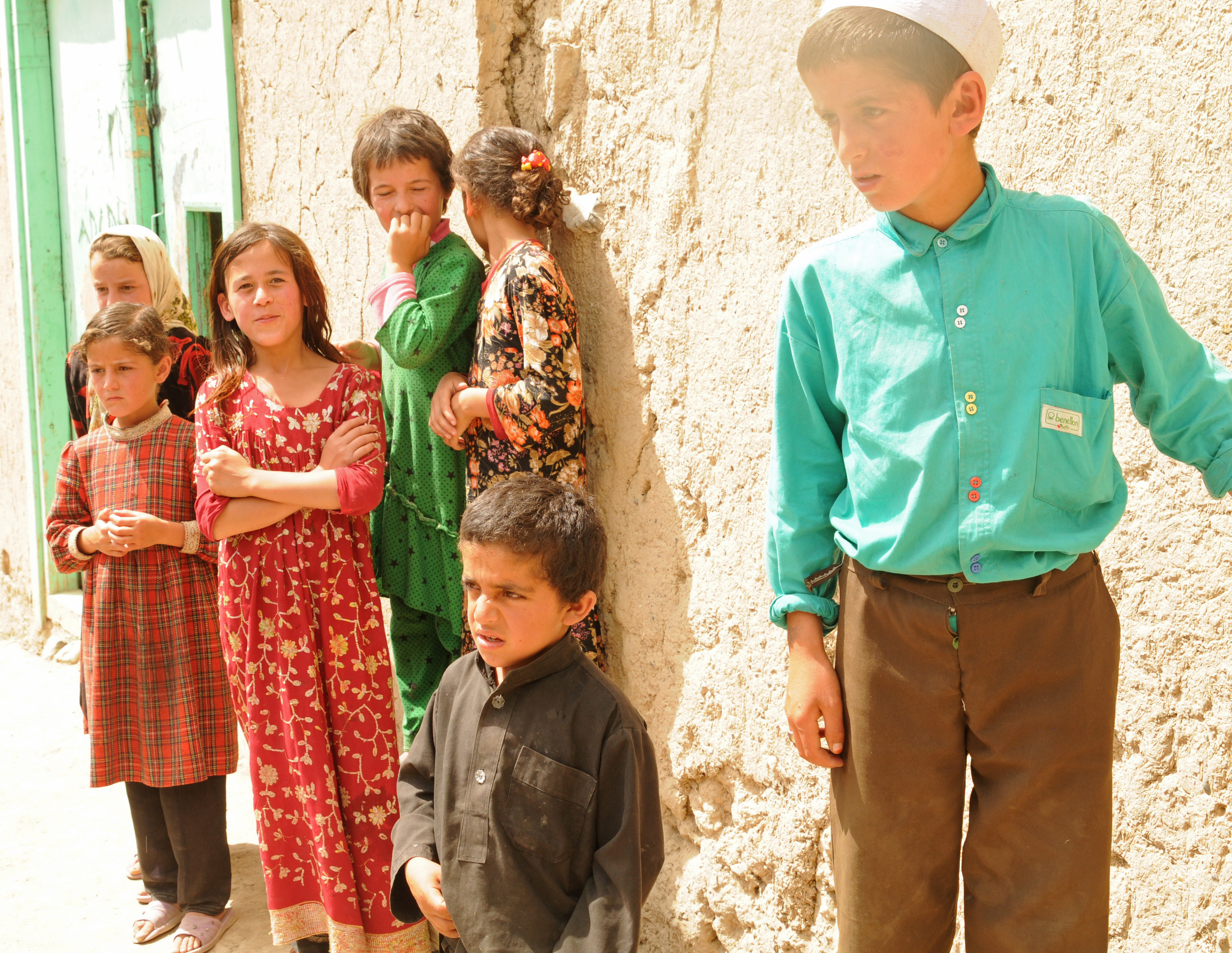
Children in Afghanistan

By a broad definition including Mongolia and Afghanistan, more than 90 million people live in Central Asia, about 2% of Asia's total population. Of the regions of Asia, only North Asia has fewer people. It has a population density of 9 people per km^{2}, vastly less than the 80.5 people per km^{2} of the continent as a whole. Kazakhstan is one of the least densely populated countries in the world.

=== Languages ===
Russian, as well as being spoken by around six million ethnic Russians and Ukrainians of Central Asia, is the de facto lingua franca throughout the former Soviet Central Asian republics. Mandarin Chinese has an equally dominant presence in Inner Mongolia, Qinghai, and Xinjiang.

The languages of the majority of the inhabitants of the former Soviet Central Asian republics belong to the Turkic language group. Turkmen is mainly spoken in Turkmenistan, and as a minority language in Afghanistan, Russia, Iran, and Turkey. Kazakh and Kyrgyz are related languages of the Kypchak group of Turkic languages and are spoken throughout Kazakhstan, Kyrgyzstan, and as a minority language in Tajikistan, Afghanistan and Xinjiang. Uzbek and Uyghur are spoken in Uzbekistan, Tajikistan, Kyrgyzstan, Afghanistan, and Xinjiang.

Middle Iranian languages were once spoken throughout Central Asia, such as the once prominent Sogdian, Khwarezmian, Bactrian and Scythian, which are now extinct and belonged to the Eastern Iranian family. The Eastern Iranian Pashto language is still spoken in Afghanistan and northwestern Pakistan. Other minor Eastern Iranian languages such as Shughni, Munji, Ishkashimi, Sarikoli, Wakhi, Yaghnobi and Ossetic are also spoken at various places in Central Asia. Varieties of Persian are also spoken as a major language in the region, locally known as Dari (in Afghanistan), Tajik (in Tajikistan and Uzbekistan), and Bukhori (by the Bukharan Jews of Central Asia).

Tocharian, another Indo-European language group, which was once predominant in oases on the northern edge of the Tarim Basin of Xinjiang, is now extinct.

Other language groups include the Tibetic languages, spoken by around six million people across the Tibetan Plateau and into Qinghai, Sichuan (Szechwan), Ladakh and Baltistan, and the Nuristani languages of northeastern Afghanistan. Korean is spoken by the Koryo-saram minority, mainly in Kazakhstan and Uzbekistan.

=== Religions ===
Religion in Central Asia
1. Islam 87.78 (85.3%)
2. Christianity 7.29 (7.08%)
3. Irreligion 6.44 (6.26%)
4. Folk religion 0.8 (0.78%)
5. Buddhism 0.4 (0.39%)
6. Others 0.21 (0.20%)
7. Judaism 0.02 (0.02%)

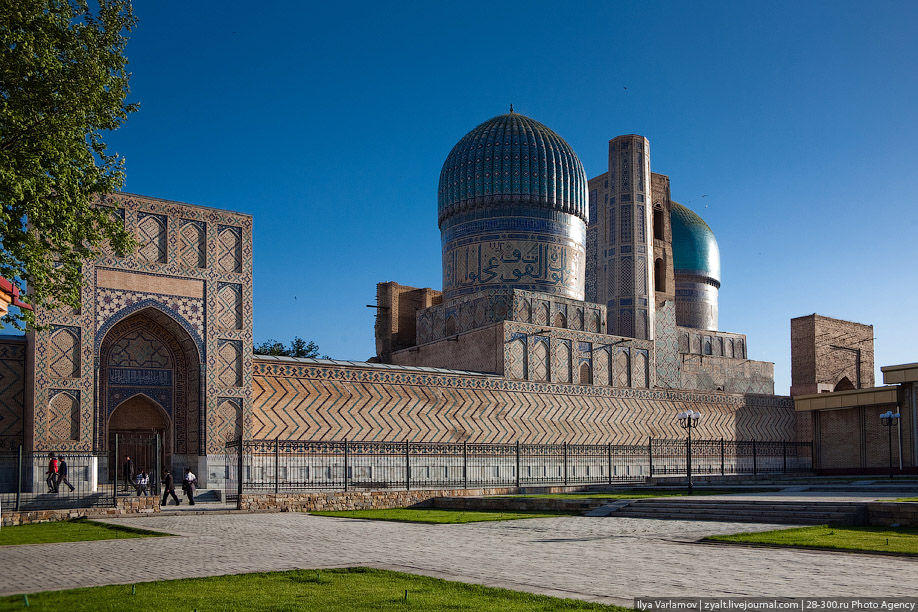
Bibi Khanym Mosque in Uzbekistan

Islam is the religion most common in the Central Asian Republics, Afghanistan, Xinjiang, and the peripheral western regions, such as Bashkortostan. Most Central Asian Muslims are Sunni, although there are sizable Shia minorities in Afghanistan and Tajikistan.

Buddhism and Zoroastrianism were the major faiths in Central Asia before the arrival of Islam. Zoroastrian influence is still felt today in such celebrations as Nowruz, held in all five of the Central Asian states. The transmission of Buddhism along the Silk Road eventually brought the religion to China. Amongst the Turkic peoples, Tengrism was the leading religion before Islam. Tibetan Buddhism is most common in Tibet, Mongolia, Ladakh, and the southern Russian regions of Siberia.

The form of Christianity most practiced in the region in previous centuries was Nestorianism, but now the largest denomination is the Russian Orthodox Church, with many members in Kazakhstan, where about 25% of the population of 19 million identify as Christian, 17% in Uzbekistan and 5% in Kyrgyzstan. Pew Research Center estimates indicate that in 2010, around 6 million Christians lived in Central Asian countries, the Pew Forum study finds that Kazakhstan (4.1 million) has the largest Christian population in the region, followed by Uzbekistan (710,000), Kyrgyzstan (660,000), Turkmenistan (320,000) and Tajikistan (100,000).

The Bukharan Jews were once a sizable community in Uzbekistan and Tajikistan, but nearly all have emigrated since the dissolution of the Soviet Union.

In Siberia, shamanistic practices persist, including forms of divination such as Kumalak.

Contact and migration with Han people from China has brought Confucianism, Daoism, Mahayana Buddhism, and other Chinese folk beliefs into the region.

Central Asia is where many integral beliefs and elements in various religious traditions of Judaism, Christianity, Islam, Buddhism.

Country	Population	Muslim		Christian		Irreligion		Folk Religion		Other Religion		Buddhist		Jewish	
Country	Population	Pop.	%	Pop.	%	Pop.	%	Pop.	%	Pop.	%	Pop.	%	Pop.	%
Uzbekistan	27,440,000	26,534,480	96.70%	631,120	2.30%	219,520	0.80%	10,000	<0.1%	10,000	<0.1%	10,000	<0.1%	10,000	<0.1%
Tajikistan	6,880,000	6,652,960	96.70%	110,080	1.60%	103,200	1.50%	0	<0.1%	0	<0.1%	0	<0.1%	0	<0.1%
Turkmenistan	5,040,000	4,687,200	93.00%	322,560	6.40%	25,200	0.50%	0	<0.1%	0	<0.1%	0	<0.1%	0	<0.1%
Kyrgyzstan	6,520,000	5,868,000	90.00%	521,600	8.00%	130,400	2.00%	0	0.00%	0	0.00%	0	0.00%	0	0.00%
Kazakhstan	18,745,000	12,990,285	69.30%	3,130,415	16.70%	2,493,085	13.30%	20,620	0.10%	18,745	0.10%	16,870	0.10%	3,400	0.02%
Total	64,625,000	55,535,690	85.94%	4,663,615	7.22%	4,158,860	6.44%	51,370	0.08%	136,105	0.21%	26,870	0.04%	10,000	0.02%

== See also ==
- Central Asia Regional Economic Cooperation Program
- Central Asian Football Federation
- Central Asian Games
- Central Asian Union
- Central Asians in ancient Indian literature
- Chinese Central Asia
- Chinese Turkestan
- Continental pole of inaccessibility
- Hindutash
- Inner Asia
- Mountains of Central Asia
- Russian Turkestan
