= Central Asia plus Japan =

Political initiative of Japan and Central Asia

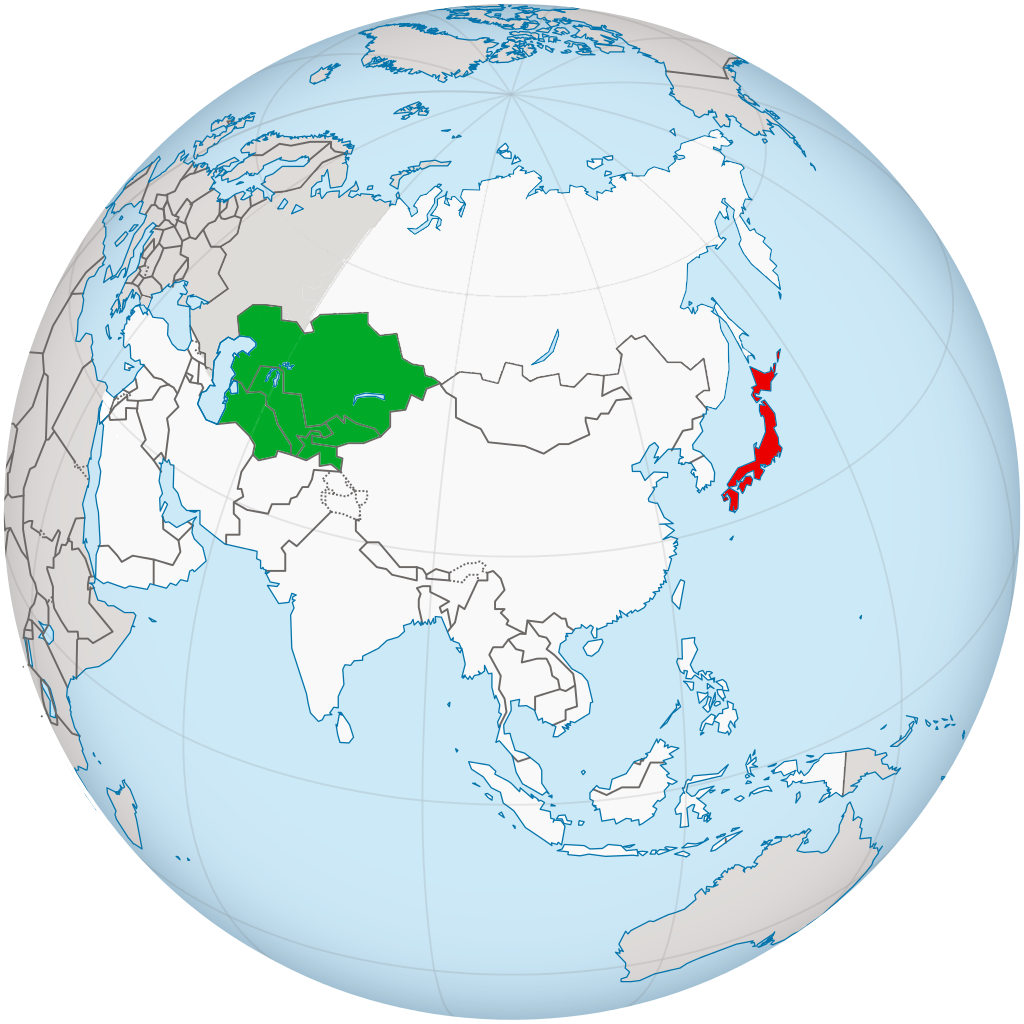

The Central Asia plus Japan dialogue is a political initiative between Japan and the Central Asian nations of Kazakhstan, Kyrgyzstan, Tajikistan, Turkmenistan and Uzbekistan, with the goal to create “a new framework for cooperation, thereby elevating relations between Japan and Central Asia to a new level”. The dialogue, according to the Japanese Foreign Ministry, is also meant to serve as a forum to promote inter-regional cooperation. Turkmenistan, maintaining its policy of neutrality, participates only as an observer.

== Participating Members ==
- Japan
- Kazakhstan
- Kyrgyzstan
- Tajikistan
- Uzbekistan
- Turkmenistan

== Initial declaration ==
The dialogue was formally declared on 28 August 2004 in Astana, Kazakhstan at a meeting of foreign ministers from the four participating Central Asian governments and Japan. A joint statement was issued which outlined the parties' views on four areas: fundamental principles and values, expansion of Japanese-Central Asian relations, intra-regional cooperation within Central Asia, and cooperation in the international arena. The statement also declared the dialogue's main objectives:

- The strengthening of peace, stability, and democracy in the Central Asian region
- The strengthening of the region’s economic foundations, the promotion of reform and the social development of the region, including the correction of intra-regional disparities
- The strengthening of intra-regional cooperation by the Central Asian countries
- The maintenance and development of good relations between Central Asia and neighboring regions as well as with the international community
- Cooperation between Japan and Central Asia with respect to both regional issues and issues having international dimensions.

The joint statement also outlined several areas of potential Japanese-Central Asian cooperation.

According to Kawaguchi, the first meeting was possible due to the efforts of current President of Kazakhstan Kassym-Jomart Tokayev, who in 2004 was the country’s foreign minister.

== Subsequent meetings ==
On 4 March 2005, the five countries met again in Tashkent, Uzbekistan, where "the participants reconfirmed the significance of the 'Central Asia plus Japan' Dialogue," and to "promote concrete cooperation... utilizing the framework of the Dialogue". On 5 June 2006 a meeting was held in Tokyo. There, the five countries agreed to continue to hold further meetings of foreign ministers in the future. They also discussed advancements in Japanese-Central Asian exchanges, and the challenges facing inter-regional cooperation, with Japan pledging further support in many areas. The Afghan foreign minister attended the meeting as a "guest".

Additionally, two "Intellectual Dialogues" have been held in Tokyo with the aim of expanding intellectual exchanges between the two regions.

The 4th meeting took place on 10 November 2012 in Tokyo. Foreign Minister of Kyrgyzstan Erlan Abdyldaev, Foreign Minister of Japan Koichiro Gemba, Foreign Minister of Kazakhstan Idrisov, Foreign Minister of Tajikistan Hamrohon Zarifi, Foreign Minister of Turkmenistan Rashid Meredov, Deputy Foreign Minister of Uzbekistan Vladimir Norov attended the event. During this meeting, the Government of Japan pledged US $700 million for the projects which will facilitate regional cooperation.

On 20 December 2025, the first leaders' level Summit of the "Central Asia plus Japan" Dialogue took place in Tokyo, chaired by Prime Minister Sanae Takaichi of Japan. It was attended by the Presidents of Kazakhstan, Kyrgyzstan, Tajikistan, Turkmenistan, and Uzbekistan, along with respective Ministers.

== Motivation and significance ==
Japan's efforts in creating the "Central Asia plus Japan" dialogue is part of its "Silk Road diplomacy", a term used for Japan's current Central Asia policy. This policy has two distinct goals: to further enhance bilateral relationships in the region, and to promote regional dialogue. The "Central Asia plus Japan" initiative is an attempt to encourage the latter. Former foreign minister Taro Aso gave four reasons for Japan's renewed interest in Central Asia:

- Given the growing regional influence of Islamic fundamentalism, Japan wants to help Central Asia not be a "weak link in the chain" of international order
- Central Asia's significant amounts of natural resources are too important to be ignored
- Japan's post-war experiences can serve as a guide for the newly independent states
- Japan has an important and growing influence in Central Asia

Aso also said, "Japan at this juncture can become a supporter that enhances momentum towards open regional cooperation... Japan hopes for a situation in which it can propose certain areas in which it is willing to cooperate; the Central Asian countries would then take that as an opportunity to enhance the ties and cooperation among themselves."

Analysts have said that Japanese efforts in the realm of regional integration and cooperation, especially with regard to Afghanistan, is helpful and complements the efforts of other groups such as the Shanghai Cooperation Organisation (SCO). It has also been suggested that the "Central Asia plus Japan" dialogue, along with the development of bilateral relations between Japan and the Central Asian countries, will help provide the region with an alternative to the growing influence of the SCO.

According to Almas Dissyukov (2019), today, the dialogue has developed its own structural elements that allow participants to discuss a broad and very rich agenda of mutually beneficial issues at the level of foreign ministers, senior officials, as well as representatives of business and academia. An early idea to hold summits between the leaders of Central Asia and Japan, however, has never been implemented.

== See also ==
- Foreign relations of Japan
- Geostrategy in Central Asia
- Post-Soviet Regional Organizations
