= Impact of the COVID-19 pandemic on science and technology =

Disruption to science, space and technology projects globally

The COVID-19 pandemic has affected innumerable scientific and technical institutions globally, resulting in lower productivity in a number of fields and programs. However, the impact of the pandemic has also led to the opening of several new research funding lines for government agencies around the world.

== Science ==
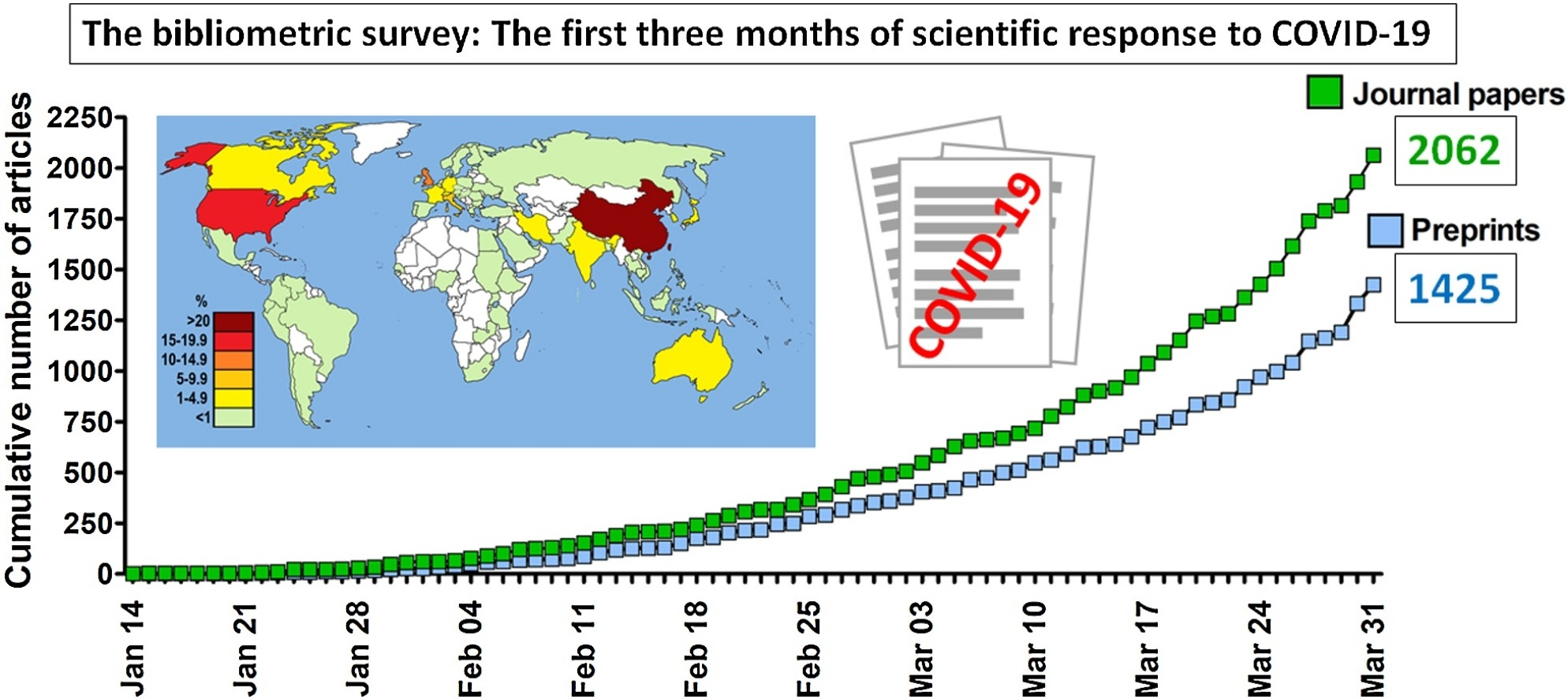
Overview of scholarly publications on COVID-19 and the pandemic in the first three months of 2020

As a result of the COVID-19 pandemic, new and improved forms of scientific communication have evolved. One example is the amount of data being published on preprint servers and the way it has been reviewed on social media platforms before being formally peer reviewed. Scientists are reviewing, editing, analyzing, and publishing manuscripts and data speedily. This intense communication may have enabled an unusual level of collaboration and efficiency among scientists. Francis Collins notes that while he has not seen research move faster, the pace of research "can still feel slow" during a pandemic. The typical research model was considered too slow for the "urgency of the coronavirus threat".

=== World Health Organization (WHO) ===
On the 4th of May, 2020, the World Health Organization (WHO) organized a telethon to raise US$8 billion from forty countries to support the rapid development of COVID-19 vaccines. WHO also announced the implementation of an international "solidarity trial" to simultaneously evaluate multiple vaccine candidates reaching phase II-III clinical trials. The "solidarity trial for treatments" is a multinational phase III-IV clinical trial, organized by WHO and its partners, to compare four untested treatments for hospitalized people with severe cases of COVID-19 disease. The trial was announced on March 18, 2020, and by April 21, 2020. Over 100 countries have participated in the trial. In addition, WHO is coordinating an international multisite randomized controlled trial—"solidarity trial for vaccines"—that will allow simultaneous assessment of the benefits and risks of different vaccine candidates being clinically tested in countries with high rates of COVID-19 disease. The WHO Vaccine Coalition prioritizes which vaccines to include in phase II and III clinical trials, and establishes harmonized phase III protocols for all vaccines that reach the pivotal testing phase.

The Coalition for Epidemic Preparedness Innovations (CEPI), which has established a US$2 billion global fund for rapid investment and development of vaccine candidates, indicated in April 2020 that a vaccine could be available under protocols of emergency use in less than 12 months, or by early 2021.

=== UNESCO ===
The seventh edition of the UNESCO Science Report, which monitors science policy and governance around the world, was in preparation as the COVID-19 pandemic began. As a result, the report documents some of the ways in which scientists, inventors, and governments used science to meet society's needs during the early stages of the pandemic. In the paper, What the COVID-19 Pandemic Reveals About the Evolving Landscape of Scientific Advice, the authors present five countries' case studies (Uruguay, Sri Lanka, Jamaica, Ghana, and New Zealand). The authors conclude, "Effective and trusted scientific advice is not simply a function of linkages with the policy-maker. It also involves an effective conversation with stakeholders and the public."

According to the World Health Organization, during the COVID-19 pandemic, Africa contributed 13% of the world's new or adapted technologies, such as robotics, 3D printing, and mobile phone apps. Many countries have accelerated their approval processes for research project proposals. For example, the innovation agencies of Argentina, Brazil, and Uruguay have issued calls for research proposals with an expedited approval process through early April 2020. Peru's two innovation agencies reduced their own response time to two weeks, as documented in the UNESCO Science Report (2021).

The UNESCO study of publication trends in 193 countries on the topic of new or re-emerging viruses that can infect humans covered the period from 2011 to 2019 and now provides an overview of the state of research prior to the COVID-19 pandemic. Global output on this broad topic increased by only 2% per year between 2011 and 2019, slower than overall global scientific publications. Growth was much higher in individual countries that had to use science to address other viral outbreaks during this period, such as Liberia to combat Ebola or Brazil to combat Zika fever. It remains to be seen whether or not the scientific landscape will shift toward a more proactive approach to health sciences after COVID-19.

=== National and intergovernmental laboratories ===
The United States Department of Energy federal scientific laboratories, such as the Oak Ridge National Laboratory, closed to all visitors and many employees; non-essential employees and scientists became remote workers. Contractors were also strongly advised to isolate their facilities and employees unless necessary. Overall, ORNL operations remain reasonably unaffected.

Lawrence Livermore National Laboratory was tasked by the White House Coronavirus Task Force to use most of its supercomputing capacity to continue the research on the virus stream, possible mutations, and other factors, while other projects were temporarily scaled back or indefinitely postponed.

The European Molecular Biology Laboratory (EMBL) closed all of its six sites in Europe (Barcelona, Grenoble, Hamburg, Heidelberg, Hinxton, and Rome). All EMBL site governments have implemented strict controls in response to the coronavirus. EMBL staff have been instructed to follow the advice of local authorities. Several staff members have been given permission to work at the sites to provide essential services such as animal facility maintenance or data services. All other staff were instructed to stay at home. EMBL also cancelled all visits to the sites by groups outside the staff. This includes physical attendance at the Heidelberg course and conference program, EMBL-EBI training courses, and all other seminars, courses, and public visits at all sites. Meanwhile, the European Bioinformatics Institute established a European COVID-19 platform for data/information exchange. The goal is to collect and share readily available research data to enable synergy, cross-fertilization, and use of different data sets with varying degrees of aggregation, validation, and/or completeness. The platform is envisioned to consist of two interconnected components, the SARS-CoV-2 data hubs, to organize the flow of SARS-CoV-2 outbreak sequence data and enable comprehensive open data exchange for the European and global research community, and a more comprehensive COVID-19 portal.

=== World Meteorological Organization ===
The World Meteorological Organization (WMO) has expressed concern about the effects of the pandemic on its monitoring system. Observations from the Aircraft Meteorological Data Relay program, which uses in-flight measurements from the fleets of 43 airlines, have been reduced by 50 to 80 percent depending on the region. Data from other automated systems have been virtually unaffected, although WMO has expressed concern that repairs and maintenance may be affected eventually. Manual observations, mainly from developing countries, have also seen a significant decrease.

=== Open science ===
The need to accelerate open scientific research prompted several civil society organizations to create an Open COVID-19 Pledge asking different industries to release their intellectual property rights during the pandemic to help find a cure for the disease. Several tech giants have joined the pledge, which includes the release of an Open COVID license. Long-time open access advocates such as Creative Commons have launched a myriad of calls and actions to promote open access in science as a key component to combat the disease. These include a public call for open access policies and a call to scientists to adopt zero embargo periods for their publications, applying a CC BY to their articles and a CC0 waiver for research data. Other organizations have challenged the current scientific culture, calling for more open and public science.

For studies and information on coronavirus that can contribute to citizen science through open science, many other online resources are available on other open science and open access websites, including an e-book chapter hosted by the medical collective EMCrit and portals run by Cambridge University Press, the Europe branch of the Scholarly Publishing and Academic Resources Coalition, The Lancet, John Wiley and Sons, and Springer Nature.

=== Medical research ===
A JAMA Network Open study examined trends in oncology clinical trials initiated before and during the COVID-19 pandemic. It was noted that pandemic-related declines in clinical trials raised concerns about the potential negative impact on the development of new cancer therapies and the extent to which these findings could be applied to other diseases.

== Computing and machine learning research and citizen science ==
In March 2020, the United States Department of Energy, National Science Foundation, NASA, industry, and nine universities pooled resources to access supercomputers from IBM combined with cloud computing resources from Hewlett Packard Enterprise, Amazon, Microsoft, and Google for drug discovery.

The COVID-19 High-Performance Computing Consortium also aims to predict the spread of disease, model possible vaccines, and study thousands of chemical compounds to develop a COVID-19 vaccine or therapy. As of May 2020, the Consortium has used up 437 petaFLOPS of computing power.

The C3.ai Digital Transformation Institute, another consortium of Microsoft, six universities (including the Massachusetts Institute of Technology, a member of the first consortium), and the National Center for Supercomputer Applications in Illinois, operating under the auspices of C3.ai, founded by Thomas Siebel, is pooling supercomputing resources for drug discovery, developing medical protocols, and improving public health strategies, and awarded large grants through May 2020 to researchers proposing to use AI for similar tasks.

In March 2020, the Folding@home distributed computing project launched a program to support medical researchers around the world. The first wave of the project will simulate potential target proteins of SARS-CoV-2 and the related SARS-CoV virus, which has already been studied.

In March, the Rosetta@home distributed computing project also joined the effort. The project uses volunteers' computers to model the proteins of the SARS-CoV-2 virus to discover potential drug targets or develop new proteins to neutralize the virus. The researchers announced that using Rosetta@home, they were able to "accurately predict the atomic-scale structure of an important coronavirus protein weeks before it could be measured in the lab."

In May 2020, the Open Pandemics—COVID-19 partnership was launched between Scripps Research and IBM's World Community Grid. The partnership is a distributed computing project that "will automatically run a simulated experiment in the background [of connected home PCs] that will help predict the efficacy of a particular chemical compound as a potential treatment for COVID-19."

Resources for informatics and scientific crowdsourcing projects on COVID-19 can be found on the internet or as apps. Some examples of such projects are listed below:

- The Eterna Open-Vaccine project allows video game players to "design an mRNA encoding a potential vaccine against the novel coronavirus."
- The EU-Citizen Science project provides "a selection of resources related to the current COVID-19 pandemic. It contains links to citizen science and crowdsourcing projects."
- The COVID-19 Citizen Science project is "a new initiative by University of California, San Francisco physician-scientists" that "will allow anyone in the world age 18 or over to become a citizen scientist advancing understanding of the disease."
- The CoronaReport digital journalism project is "a citizen science project which democratizes the reporting on the Coronavirus and makes these reports accessible to other citizens."
- The COVID Symptom Tracker is a crowdsourced study of symptoms of the virus. It has been downloaded two million times as of April 2020.
- The COVID Near you epidemiology tool "uses crowdsourced data to visualize maps to help citizens and public health agencies identify current and potential hotspots for the recent pandemic coronavirus, COVID-19."
- The We-Care project is a novel initiative by University of California, Davis researchers that uses anonymity and crowdsourced information to alert infected users and slow the spread of COVID-19.

The scientific community has held several machine learning competitions to identify false information related to the COVID-19 pandemic. Some examples are listed below:

- The First Workshop on Combating Online Hostile Posts in Regional Languages during Emergency Situation, co-located with the Association for the Advancement of Artificial Intelligence conference (AAAI-2021), focused on detecting fake news in English related to COVID-19. The data sources were various social media platforms such as Twitter, Facebook, and Instagram. Given a social media post, the objective of the shared task was to classify it as fake or real news. The winner of the task presented an ensemble approach based on fine-tuning COVID-Twitter-BERT models.
- The Sixth Workshop on Noisy User-generated Text: Identification of Informative COVID-19 English Tweets, aimed to automatically identify whether a COVID-19 related English tweet is informative or not. The organizers provided the research community with a new dataset of tweets for identification. The selection of tweets included information about suspected, confirmed, recovered, and death cases, as well as the location or travel history of cases. The winning solution for the workshop task presented a neural network ensemble consisting of the COVID-Twitter-BERT and RoBERTa language models.

== Space ==
=== NASA ===
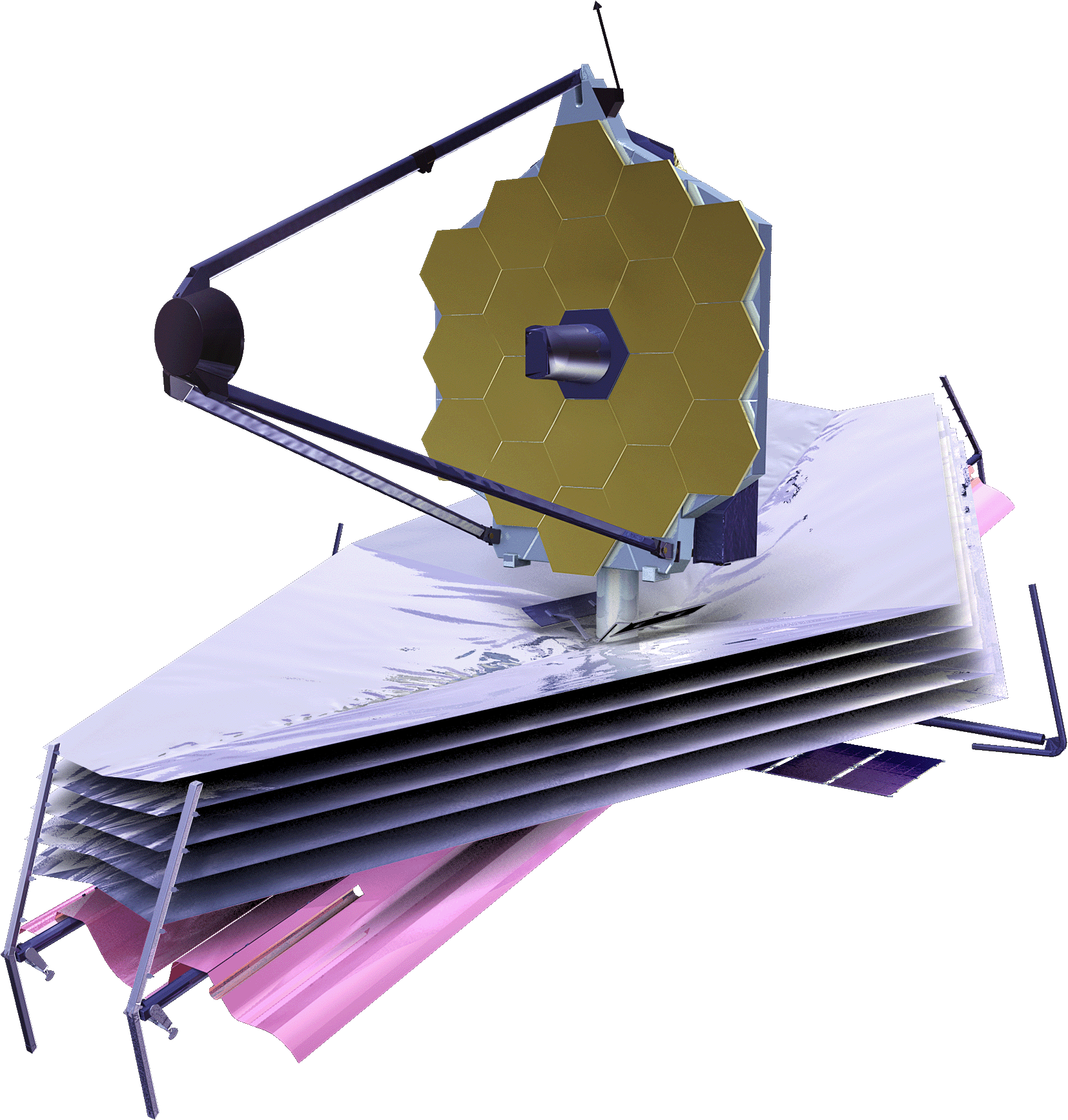
The launch of the James Webb Space Telescope was postponed to December 25, 2021.

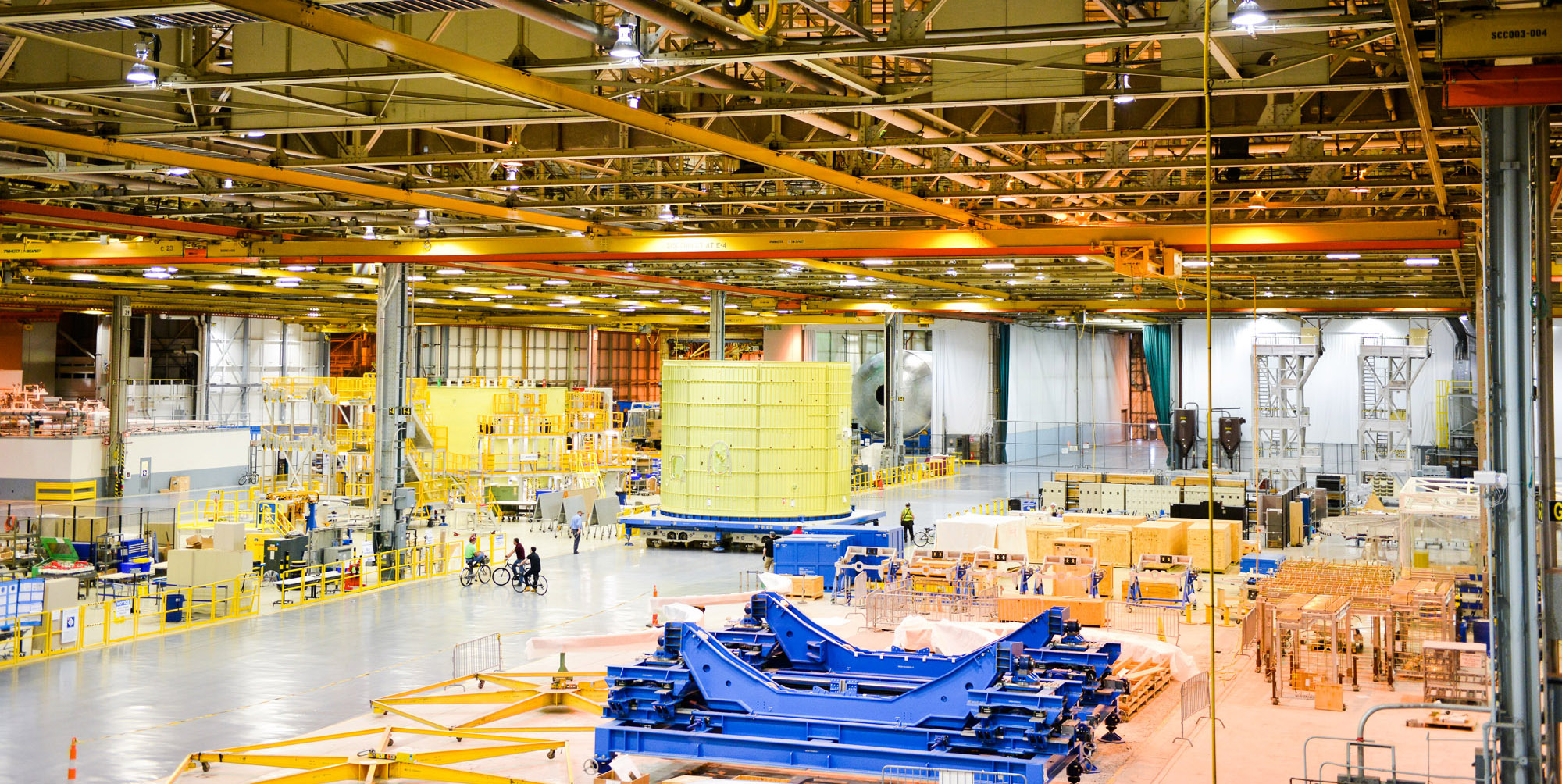
Components of the Space Launch System

NASA announced the temporary closure of all visitor complexes at its field centers until further notice and asked all non-critical personnel to work from home if possible. Production and manufacturing of the Space Launch System at the Michoud Assembly Facility was halted, and further delays occurred for the James Webb Space Telescope, although work resumed on June 3, 2020.

The majority of Johnson Space Center personnel transitioned to telecommunicating, and mission-critical personnel on the International Space Station were ordered to reside in the mission control room until further notice. Station operations were relatively unaffected, but astronauts on new expeditions are subject to longer more stringent pre-flight quarantine.

NASA's emergency response framework varied based on local virus cases around its agency's field centers. As of March 24, 2020, the following space centers had moved to Stage 4.

- Glenn Research Center in Ohio
- Plum Brook Station in Ohio
- Armstrong Flight Research Center in California
- Wallops Flight Facility in Virginia
- Goddard Institute for Space Studies in New York
- Goddard Space Flight Center in Maryland, which also reported its first COVID-19 positive employee case.

Two facilities were maintained at Stage 4 after reporting new cases of coronavirus: the Michoud Assembly Facility reported its first employee to test positive for COVID-19, and Stennis Space Center recorded the second case of a NASA community member with the virus. Kennedy Space Center maintained at Stage 3 after a workforce member tested positive. Due to the mandatory remote work policy already in place, the individual had not been on-site for more than a week before the onset of symptoms. On May 18, the Michoud facility began resuming work operations on the SLS, but so far remains in a Level 3 status.

At Level 4, mandatory remote work is in effect for all personnel except for limited personnel required for mission-critical work and to ensure and maintain the safety and security of the facility.

=== ESA ===
The European Space Agency (ESA) directed many of its science and technology facility personnel to telework whenever possible.

Developments, including increased restrictions by national, regional, and local authorities across Europe and the first positive COVID-19 test result among European Space Operations Centre personnel, led the agency to further restrict on-site personnel at its mission control centres.

ESA Director of Operations, Rolf Densing, strongly advised mission personnel to reduce activity on science missions, especially on interplanetary spacecraft.

The affected spacecraft had stable orbits and long-duration missions, so turning off their science instruments and placing them into a largely unattended safety configuration for a certain period of time would have a negligible impact on their overall mission performance.

Examples of such missions include:

- Cluster – A four-spacecraft mission launched in 2000, orbiting Earth to study our planet's magnetic environment and how it is forged by the solar wind, the stream of charged particles constantly released by the Sun;
- ExoMars Trace Gas Orbiter – Launched in 2016, the spacecraft orbited Mars, where it studied the planet's atmosphere and provided data relay for landers on the surface;
- Mars Express – Launched in 2003, the workhorse orbiter has been imaging the Martian surface and sampling the planet's atmosphere for more than a decade and a half;
- Solar Orbiter – ESA's newest science mission, launched in February 2020, was en route to its science operations orbit around the Sun.

ESA Science Director Günther Hasinger said: "It was a difficult decision, but the right one to take. Our greatest responsibility is the safety of people, and I know all of us in the science community understand why this is necessary."

The temporary reduction in on-site personnel will also allow the ESOC teams to focus on maintaining spacecraft safety for all other missions involved, especially the Mercury explorer BepiColombo, which is en route to the solar system's closest planet and would need on-site support during its planned April 10 2020 flyby of Earth. The difficult manoeuvre, which uses Earth's gravity to adjust BepiColombo's trajectory as it cruises towards Mercury, was performed by a very small number of engineers and with due regard to social distancing and other health and hygiene measures required by the current situation. Commissioning and initial checkout operations of the launched Solar Orbiter were temporarily suspended.

ESA plans to resume these operations in the near future, depending on the development of the coronavirus situation. In the meantime, Solar Orbiter will continue its journey towards the Sun, with the first Venus flyby to take place in December.

=== JAXA ===
The space and science operations of the Japan Aerospace Exploration Agency (JAXA) were virtually unaffected. However, all visits to their many field centers were suspended until April 30, 2020, to reduce contamination.

=== Commercial aerospace ===
Bigelow Aerospace announced on March 23, 2020, that it was laying off all its 88 employees. It said it would rehire the workers when pandemic restrictions were lifted. Tucson, Arizona-based World View announced on April 17, 2020, that it had terminated new business initiatives and laid off an unspecified number of employees to reduce cash outflows. The company also received rent deferrals from Pima County, Arizona.

OneWeb filed for bankruptcy on March 27, 2020, following a cash crunch due to difficulties in raising capital to complete construction and deployment of the remaining 90 percent of the network. The company had already laid off approximately 85 percent of its 531 employees, but said it would maintain operational satellite capabilities while the court restructures it and new owners for the constellation were sought.

Rocket Lab temporarily closed its launch site in New Zealand, but operations continued at its Wallops Flight Facility launch complex.

Major companies such as SpaceX and Boeing were not economically affected, except that they took extra precautions and security measures for their employees to limit the spread of the virus in their workplaces. As of April 16, 2020 Blue Origin said that it was continuing to hire staff, with about 20 more people added each week. ULA implemented an internal pandemic plan. Although some aspects of launch-related outreach were scaled back, the company made clear its intention to maintain its launch schedule.

== Telecommunications ==
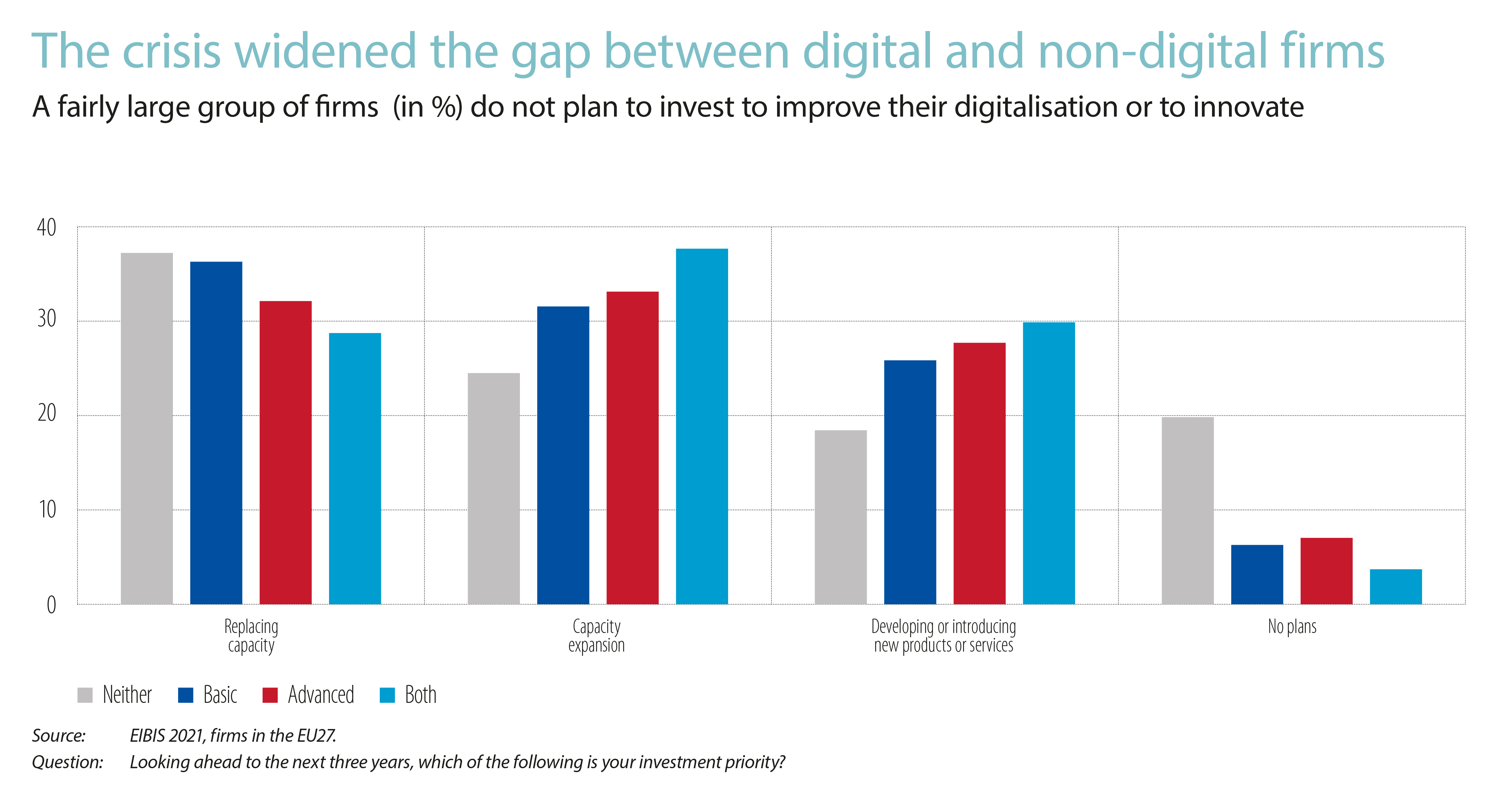
The pandemic resulted in a greater gap between digital and non-digital firms.

From 2019 to 2020, the proportion of EU enterprises employing advanced digital technology in their operations expanded dramatically. From 2020 to 2021, this percentage remained relatively stable, reaching 61% in 2021, compared to 63% in 2020 and 58% in 2019. The pandemic has caused a huge strain on internet traffic, with BT Group and Vodafone seeing a 60 and 50 percent increase in broadband usage, respectively. At the same time, Netflix, Disney+, Google, Amazon, and YouTube have considered reducing the quality of their videos to avoid overload. In addition, Sony has begun to slow down PlayStation game downloads in Europe and the United States to maintain the traffic levels.

Cellular service providers in mainland China reported significant declines in subscribers, partially due to inability of migrant workers to return to work as a result of the quarantine lockdowns; China Mobile saw a reduction of 8 million subscribers, while China Unicom had 7.8 million fewer subscribers, and China Telecom lost 5.6 million users.

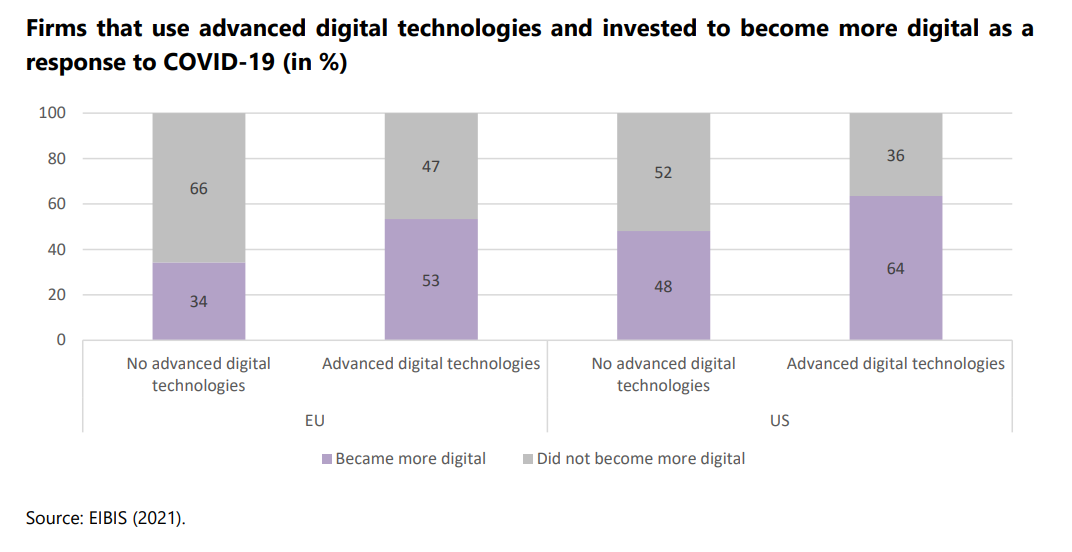
Firms that use advanced digital technologies and invested to become more digital as a response to COVID-19 (in %)

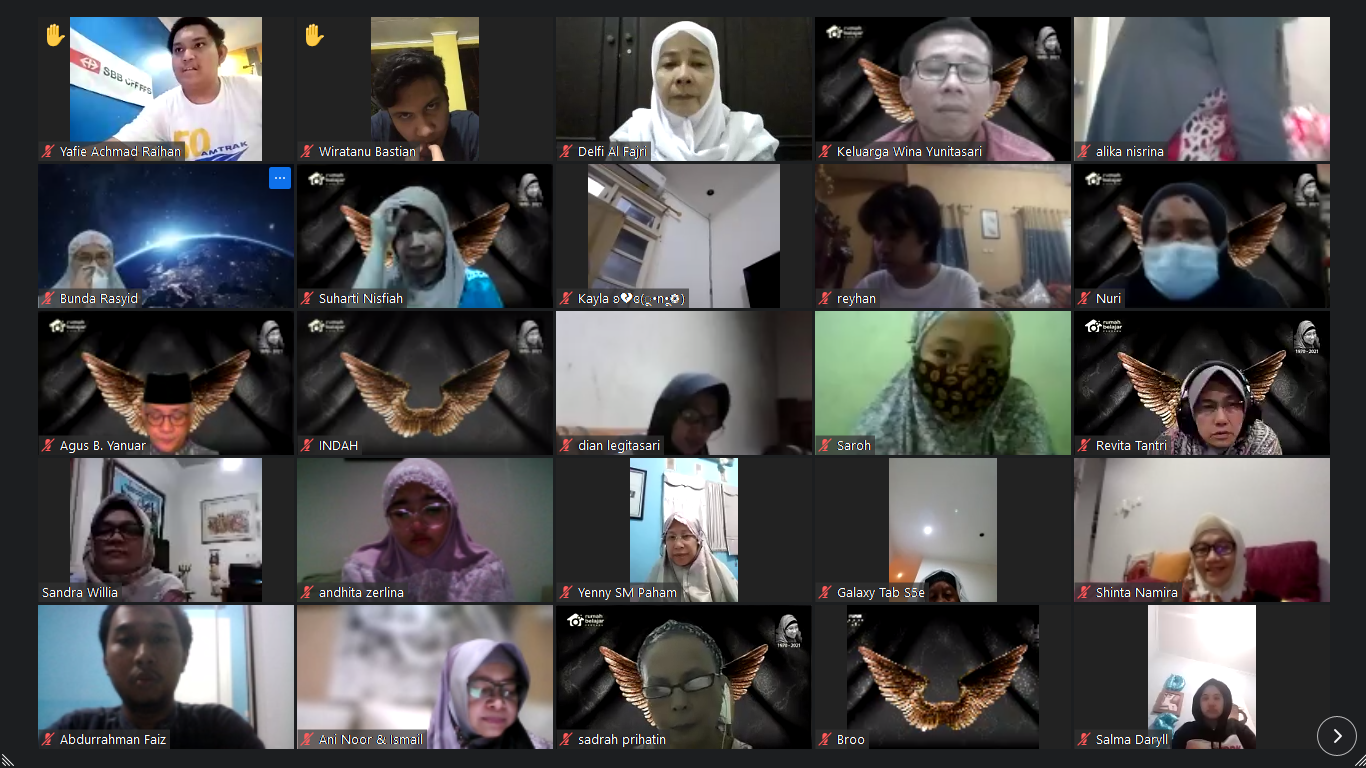
Zoom video meeting in 2021

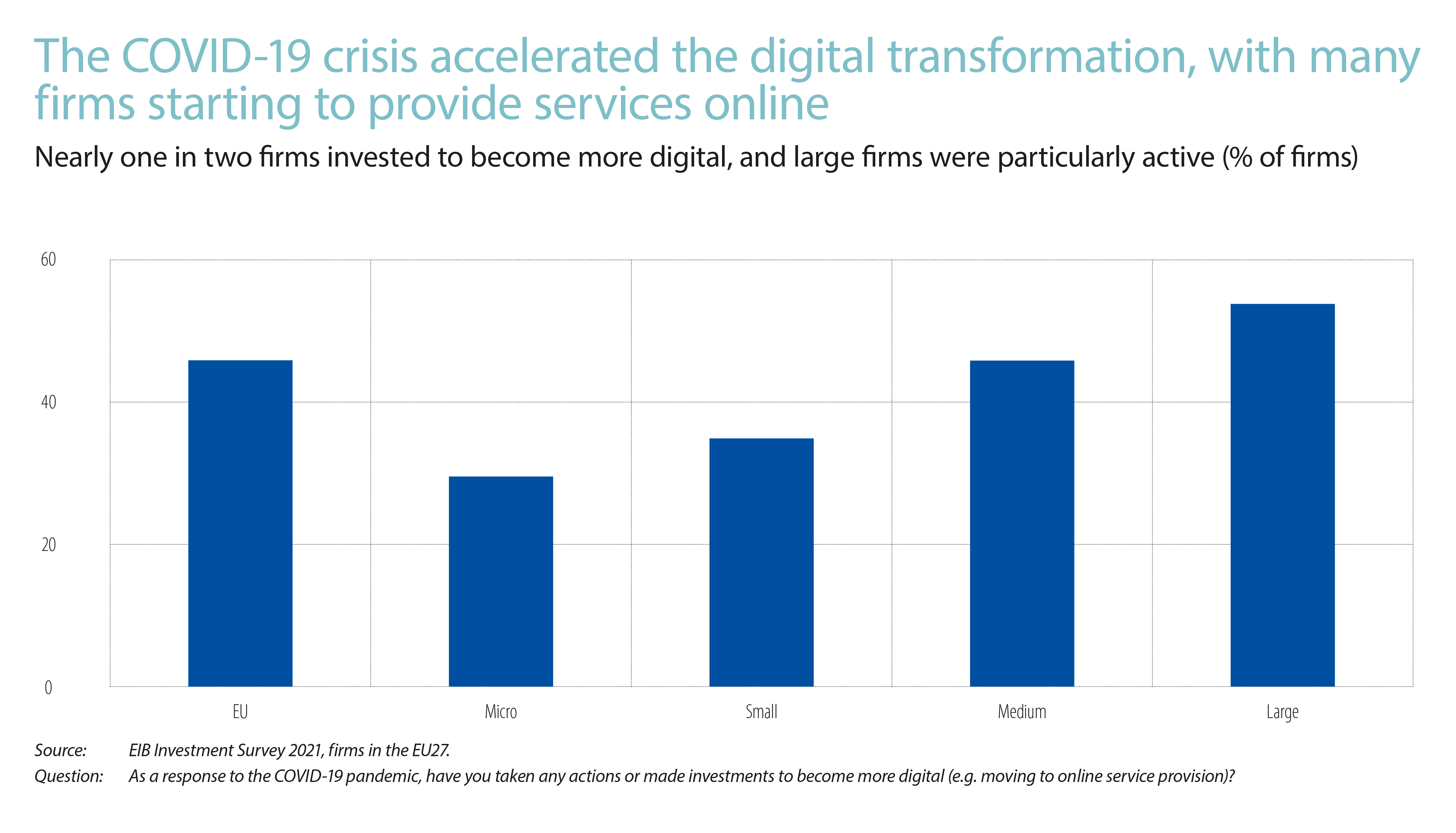
During the COVID-19 pandemic, many firms began providing services online.

Teleconferencing has been used to replace cancelled events as well as daily business meetings and social contacts. Teleconference companies such as Zoom Video Communications have seen a sharp increase in usage, accompanied by technical issues such as bandwidth overcrowding and social problems such as Zoombombing.

However, teleconferencing has also contributed to the development of distance education.

Thanks to this technology, virtual happy hours for "quarantinis" (mixed drinks) and even virtual dance parties have been organised.

A survey conducted in 2021 found that while the coronavirus outbreak has boosted overall digitization, it has also widened the digital divide, specifically across firms. Leading businesses advanced digitization more frequently, but some enterprises fell behind and were less likely to convert digitally during the pandemic. 53% of surveyed firms in the European Union had previously implemented advanced digital technology and invested more into other digital technologies. 34% of non-digital EU firms viewed the pandemic as a chance to begin investing in their digital transformation. According to the survey, 16% of EU enterprises regard to access to digital infrastructure to be a substantial barrier to investment.

A growing digital divide is also emerging - in the United States, despite non-digital enterprises being more dynamic than in the European Union, 48% of enterprises that were non-digital before to the pandemic utilized the crisis to begin investing in digital technologies, compared to 64% of firms that had previously implemented advanced digital

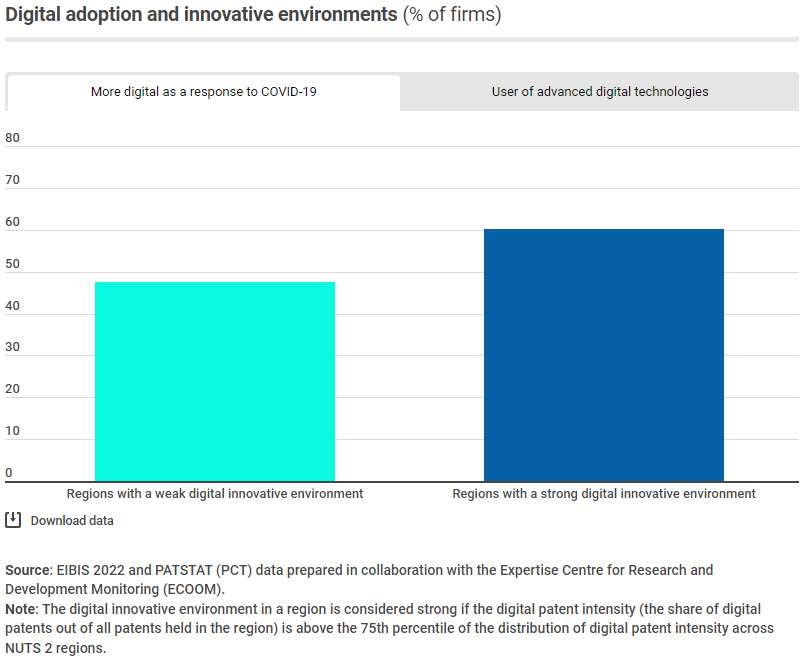
Firms in the EU became more digital as a response to COVID-19.

technology.

Digital infrastructure is essential for digital transformation. Many EU areas have the potential to enable investment in the digital transformation of firms by expanding access to faster internet. This influences organizations' decisions to go digital.

Across Europe, access to digital infrastructure is already increasing, with the great majority of homes now having access to broadband, but more has to be done to promote the spread of fast connections. There is a large proportion of enterprises citing digital infrastructure as a key barrier to investment and development across nations and regions.

One out of every five businesses in the region of Europe and Central Asia launched or grew their online business or distribution of products and services, while one out of every four businesses started or increased their remote operations.

The pandemic has also hastened corporate transformation, with over 30% of companies altering or transforming their

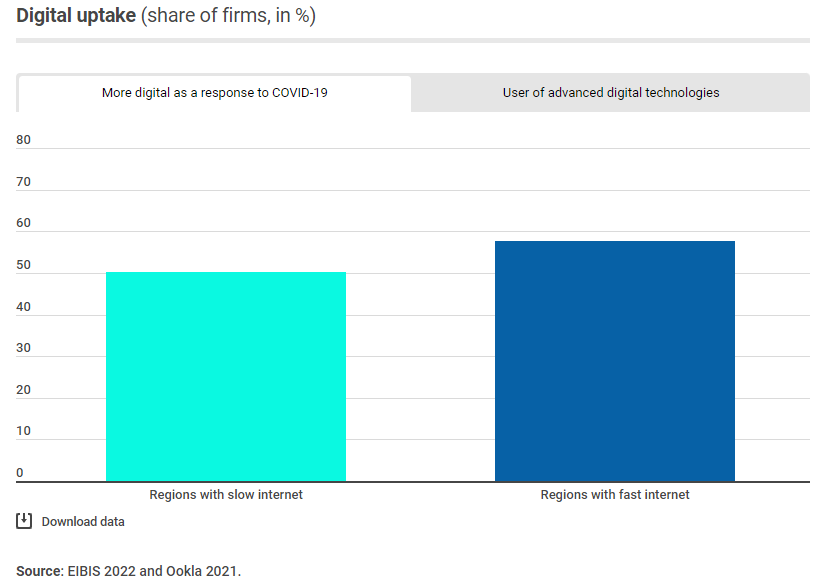
The difference between regions with slow internet vs fast internet (in the EU), and their digital uptake after the pandemic

output as a result of it. Chemical manufacturers and wholesalers were the first to respond, with one in three expanding online business activity, beginning or boosting delivery of products and services, increasing remote employment, and changing manufacturing.

Across sub-regions, Russian companies reported the highest rate of digital transformation, with more than half of them beginning or growing online activity, products delivery, and remote work.

Within Central, Eastern and Southeastern Europe, enterprises in Slovenia (48%) and Poland (44%), were the most innovative in 2022, while firms in Slovakia (14%), were the least innovative. 67% of enterprises in these regions deployed at least one sophisticated digital technology, the same as the current EU average (69%).

== See also ==
- Impact of the COVID-19 pandemic on education
- Impact of the COVID-19 pandemic on religion
- Impact of the COVID-19 pandemic on politics
- Impact of the COVID-19 pandemic on aviation
- Impact of the COVID-19 pandemic on cinema
