= UNESCO Science Report =

The UNESCO Science Report is a global monitoring report published regularly by the United Nations Educational, Scientific and Cultural Organization. Every five years, this report maps the latest trends and developments in national and regional policy landscapes, against the backdrop of shifting socio-economic, geopolitical and environmental realities. Each edition is typically released on 10 November, which is World Science Day for Peace and Development. The most recent edition was released on 11 June 2021.

== History ==
In 1987, the General Conference of UNESCO approved the launch of the Organization's first world reports, the World Communication Report, which first appeared two years later. In 1989, the General Conference approved the launch of the World Education Report, which appeared in 1991, 1993, 1995, 1998 and 2000.

The launch of these two reports created a momentum to generalize the world reports to all of UNESCO's fields of competence. The World Science Report (as the UNESCO Science Report was originally known) was the next title to appear, in 1993. The first World Information Report followed in 1997 then the World Social Science Report in 1999, as well as two World Culture Reports in 1998 and 2000. Two existing reports were merged to produce the World Communication and Information Report 1999−2000.

The World Science Report was first officially evoked in 1992 in the Preliminary Proposals by the Director-General concerning the Programme and Budget for 1994-1995. This document was submitted to UNESCO's Executive Board, which has 58 rotating member states and meets twice a year to monitor the implementation of UNESCO's programme. The document states that, 'on the basis of the lessons drawn from drafting and publishing the first UNESCO World Science Report, measures will be taken to refine and improve this undertaking'.

The World Science Report was initially an output of UNESCO's Science, Technology and Society programme. The World Science Report replaced the UNESCO journal Impact of Science on Society, which dated from the 1950s. Jacques Richardson, Head of UNESCO's Science and Society Section from 1972 to 1985 and former editor of Impact of Science on Society, observed in Sixty Years of Science at UNESCO (2006) that 'the publication of Impact continued until the early 1990s, when it was converted into the biennial World Science Report'. The editor of the first three World Science Reports (1993, 1996 and 1998) was Howard Moore, who had succeeded Jacques Richardson as editor of Impact of Science on Society. The first edition of the report reflects this influence, since the World Science Report 1993 included a section popularizing contemporary issues in basic sciences.

In 2000, the production of world reports was suspended pending the outcome of an external evaluation of UNESCO's policy with regard to world reports. The evaluation recommended to the Executive Board of UNESCO that, 'in the future, there should be one single UNESCO world report to be published every two years on a specific issue to be chosen by the organs [sic] of the Organization in an interactive way and presented to the General Conference for further debate, while the existing world reports should continue as analytical reports on the state of the art in education, the sciences, culture, and communication and information in four- to six-year intervals.'

Several of the existing reports were consequently revived, including the World Science Report, World Social Science Report (in 2010) and the World Education Report. The latter was renamed the Education for All Global Monitoring Report.

In order to avoid confusion with UNESCO's new series of thematic world reports, UNESCO's analytical report on the state of the global support system for science was renamed the UNESCO Science Report. Susan Schneegans was Coordinator and Editor in Chief of the series from 2003 to 2021.

In line with the recommendations of the external evaluation of UNESCO's policy with regard to world reports, the periodicity of the UNESCO Science Report was changed to five years in 2005 and the series adopted a stronger focus on monitoring global trends and developments not only in science and technology policy but also in innovation policy. The focus has been on demonstrating that science, technology and innovation policy and science governance do not evolve in a vacuum but, rather, are influenced by political, socio-economic and environmental factors and, in turn, influence these.

The five-year interval between reports reflects the fact that 'a quinquennial report has the advantage of being able to focus on longer-term trends, rather than becoming entrenched in descriptions of short-term annual fluctuations which, with respect to policy and science and technology indicators, rarely add much value'.

By 2024, four editions of the UNESCO Science Report had been published, in 2005, 2010, 2015 and 2021. The release of the latter edition was delayed to June 2021 to enable the report to analyse the initial impact of the Covid-19 pandemic on the world's science systems.

== Geographical coverage ==
Each edition has added geographic detail. The 2021 edition of the UNESCO Science Report provided data for 193 countries, with contributions from more than 70 authors from 52 countries. Published in June 2021, the seventh report in the series arrived at a crucial juncture, as countries were one-third of the way to the 2030 deadline for achieving their Sustainable Development Goals (SDGs). The report revealed that countries of all income levels shared a common agenda at this time for transitioning to digital and 'green' economies.

Themes covered in 2021 included our relationship with advanced technologies and the resources and energy they require, the Fourth Industrial Revolution, the effect of Brexit on science and technology and the status of women in science and Industry 4.0. For the first time, an analysis of scientific output broke down the broad field of cross-cutting strategic technologies into its sub-fields, such as artificial intelligence and robotics, energy and nanotechnology. The report found that the COVID-19 pandemic had energized knowledge production systems. This dynamic built on the trend towards greater international scientific collaboration, which bodes well for tackling this and other global challenges such as climate change and biodiversity loss. However, sustainability science was not yet mainstream in academic publishing by 2021, according to the report's assessment of output on 56 topics of priority for reaching the Sustainable Development Goals, even though countries were investing more than before in green technologies.

The 2021 edition concluded that countries would need to invest more in research and innovation, if they were to succeed in their dual digital and green transition. More than 30 countries had already raised their research spending between 2014 and 2018, in line with their commitment to the Sustainable Development Goals. Despite this progress, eight out of ten countries still devoted less than 1% of GDP to research in 2018, according to the UNESCO Institute for Statistics, perpetuating their dependence on foreign technologies.

The 2015 edition of the UNESCO Science Report had provided data on 189 countries and profiles of varying length of 140 countries. It contained three global chapters, 13 regional chapters and 11 chapters on individual countries, namely on: Brazil, Canada, China, India, Iran, Israel, Malaysia, Japan, the Republic of Korea, Russian Federation and United States of America.

Themes covered in 2015 include the recent reform of higher education in Afghanistan, West Africa's first Policy on Science and Technology (ECOPOST), science and technology in individual countries, including Brazil, Botswana, Kazakhstan, Malawi, Uganda, the United Republic of Tanzania, Zimbabwe and the Pacific Islands, biomedical research in the United States, challenges facing innovation in Malaysia, the anticipated effect of Brexit on science and technology, the status of female participation in scientific research and the development of South-South cooperation in science.

The UNESCO Science Report has evolved over the years and the report's geographical coverage has expanded. The 2015 edition of the UNESCO Science Report observed that, 'although most research and development is taking place in high-income countries, innovation is pervasive and is occurring in countries across the full spectrum of income levels'.

All the reports in the series are open access. They may be downloaded and purchased in various languages.

== Sources ==
This article incorporates text from a free content work. Licensed under CC-BY-SA IGO 3.0. Text taken from UNESCO Science Report: Towards 2030, UNESCO.
