= Science and technology in Pacific Island countries =

Science and technology in Pacific Island countries encompass a diverse range of activities and innovations that address the unique challenges faced by this geographically dispersed region. Despite limited resources and infrastructural constraints, Pacific Island nations have made notable progress in areas such as digital connectivity, agricultural innovation, and climate resilience. Advancements in mobile and internet technologies have improved access to information and services, while regional cooperation has fostered the development of research networks and shared scientific infrastructure. The application of emerging technologies, including nuclear science for agriculture and DNA monitoring for biosecurity, is increasingly shaping policy and development initiatives. However, the region continues to face obstacles such as data scarcity, limited research funding, and vulnerability to climate change, necessitating ongoing collaboration and investment to realize the full potential of science and technology for sustainable development.

== Socio-economic context ==
=== Trends ===
Pacific Island economies are mostly dependent on natural resources, with a tiny manufacturing sector and no heavy industry. In Fiji and Papua New Guinea, for instance, there is a need to adopt automated machinery and design in forestry and to improve training, in order to add value to exports.

Papua New Guinea experienced the strongest economic growth between 2005 and 2013 (60%), during the commodities boom. Even during the global financial and economic crisis of 2008–2009, its economy grew by 13%. Vanuatu saw the next strongest growth (35%) over this period, including 10% growth in 2008–2009. Growth was more pedestrian in the Marshall Islands (a cumulative 19%), Tuvalu (16%), Samoa (15%), Kiribati (13%), Fiji (12%) and Tonga (8%). The economies of the Federated States of Micronesia and Palau actually shrank over this nine-year period. Samoa, the Marshall Islands and Fiji all experienced recession in 2008 and 2009.

The trade balance is more skewed towards imports than exports, with the exception of Papua New Guinea, which has a mining industry. There is growing evidence that Fiji is becoming a re-export hub in the Pacific; between 2009 and 2013, its re-exports grew threefold, accounting for more than half of all exports by Pacific Island states. Samoa can also expect to become more integrated in global markets from now on, having joined the World Trade Organization in 2012. Fiji, Papua New Guinea and the Solomon Islands are also members of the World Trade Organization.

Pacific Island states make up a very small share of the South Pacific's high-tech exports. These exports receded between 2008 and 2013 by 46% for Fiji and by 41% for Samoa, according to the United Nations' Comtrade database. Fiji's high-tech exports were down from US$5.0 million to US$2.7 million and Samoa's from US$0.3 to US$0.2 million.

In 2013, the majority of Fijian high-tech exports were pharmaceutical products (84%), whereas Samoa exports mainly scientific instruments (86%) and Kiribati non-electrical machinery (79%). Armaments make up 92% of high-exports from the Solomon Islands.

=== Internet access ===
By 2013, one in three inhabitants of Fiji, Tonga and Tuvalu had Internet access. Growth in Internet access since 2010 has levelled out the disparity between countries to some extent, although connectivity remained extremely low in Vanuatu (11%), the Solomon Islands (8%) and Papua New Guinea (7%) in 2013.

Advances in mobile phone technology have clearly been a factor in the provision of Internet access to remote areas. The flow of knowledge and information through internet is likely to play an important role in the more effective dissemination and application of knowledge across the vast Pacific Island nations.

Mobile Internet penetration was the lowest (18%) of any region in the world in 2018 but this figure is expected to double by 2023. In this remote region, high-speed Internet access comes from laying an expensive undersea cable. Recent links have been created for Papua New Guinea (2020), the Solomon Islands (2020) and Tonga (2018).

Pacific countries are reshaping their social and economic environments to meet digital demands. To benefit from modern digital and other technological tools, regulatory bodies have adopted social media platforms and messaging systems in official protocols to disseminate disaster warnings in Samoa, Tonga, Fiji and Niue, as well as weather forecasts and information on climate change.

In 2015, the Pacific Islands Forum Leaders established an ICT Working Group made up of CROP agencies that is co-ordinated by the University of the South Pacific. However, no regional mechanism has since emerged in this area.

In the Boe Declaration on Regional Security, produced during the 2018 Pacific Islands Forum, Pacific leaders expanded the concept of security to include cybersecurity. Efforts are under way to assess cybersecurity capacity in Polynesia, Melanesia and Micronesia, in tandem with the United Nations International Telecommunication Union and other partners. Samoa has been the first to develop a National Cyber Security Strategy 2016–2021.

== Regional initiatives ==
=== Regional bodies addressing technological issues ===
Both the largest and smallest Pacific nations acknowledge that taking a regional approach to science and technology offers them greater opportunities for institutional development. This approach is encapsulated in the Framework for Pacific Regionalism (2014). All 14 nations have mandated the agencies attached to the Council of Regional Organisations of the Pacific (CROP) to conduct technical backstopping. CROP agencies partially fulfill the role that a science council might play in other regions. However, none of these agencies has a specific mandate or policy for science and technology.

Pacific Island states have established a number of regional bodies to address technological issues for sectorial development. Examples are the Council of Regional Organisations of the Pacific, such as the Pacific Community (SPC); Pacific Islands Forum Secretariat; and Secretariat of the Pacific Region Environmental Programme.

The Ministers of Education from Pacific Island countries signed a Ministerial communiqué on Pacific Science, Technology and Innovation in 2017, in which they committed to developing regional and national STI policies and roadmaps. However, no policy or roadmap has since been published for want of resources.

The 2014 Small Island Developing States (SIDS) Accelerated Modalities of Action Pathway (SAMOA Pathway) identified science and technology as being critical to SIDS’ sustainable development.

The need for research is being recognized at the regional level. The Pacific Community Centre for Ocean Science was established in New Caledonia in 2015, hosted by SPC. Construction of the Pacific Climate Change Centre was completed in Apia, Samoa in 2019 (see below).

=== Pacific–Europe Network for Science, Technology and Innovation ===
Logo for the PACE-Net Plus project

The establishment of the Pacific–Europe Network for Science, Technology and Innovation (PACE-Net Plus) goes some way towards filling the void in science policy, at least temporarily. Funded by the European Commission within its Seventh Framework Programme for Research and Innovation (2007–2013), this project has spanned the period 2013–2016 and thus overlaps with the European Union's Horizon 2020 programme.

The objectives of PACE–Net Plus are to reinforce the dialogue between the Pacific region and Europe in science, technology and innovation; to support biregional research and innovation through calls for research proposals; and to promote scientific excellence and industrial and economic competition. Ten of its 16 members come from the Pacific region and the remainder from Europe.

The Pacific partners are the Australian National University, Montroix Pty Ltd (Australia), University of the South Pacific, Institut Malardé in French Caledonia, National Centre for Technological Research into Nickel and its Environment in New Caledonia, South Pacific Community, Landcare Research Ltd in New Zealand, University of Papua New Guinea, Samoa National University and the Vanuatu Cultural Centre.

The other six partners are: the Association of Commonwealth Universities, the Institut de recherche pour le développement in France, the Technical Centre for Agricultural and Rural Cooperation, a joint international institution of the African, Caribbean and Pacific Group of States and the European Union, the Sociedade Portuguesa de Inovação, United Nations Industrial Development Organization and Leibniz Centre for Tropical Marine Ecology in Germany.

PACE-Net Plus focuses on three societal challenges:

- Health, demographic change and well-being;
- Food security, sustainable agriculture, marine and maritime research and the bio-economy; and
- Climate action, resource efficiency and raw materials.

PACE–Net Plus has organized a series of high-level policy dialogue platforms alternately in the Pacific region and in Brussels, the headquarters of the European Commission. These platforms bring together key government and institutional stakeholders in both regions, around STI issues.

A conference held in Suva (Fiji) in 2012 under the umbrella of PACE–Net Plus produced recommendations for a strategic plan for research, innovation and development in the Pacific. The conference report published in 2013 identified R&D needs in the Pacific in seven areas:

- health;
- agriculture and forestry;
- fisheries and aquaculture;
- biodiversity and ecosystem management;
- freshwater;
- natural hazards; and
- energy.

=== Pacific Islands University Research Network ===
Official PIURN logo

Noting the general absence of regional and national policies and plans for science, technology and innovation in the Pacific, the PACE–Net Plus conference established the Pacific Islands University Research Network to support intra- and inter- regional knowledge creation and sharing and to prepare succinct recommendations for the development of a regional policy framework for science, technology and innovation.

This formal research network will complement the Fiji-based University of the South Pacific, which has campuses in other Pacific Island countries.

=== Importance of data to inform policy ===
It was intended for the policy role of the Pacific Islands University Research Network to be informed by evidence gleaned from measuring capability in science, technology and innovation but the absence of data presents a formidable barrier. As of 2015, only Fiji had recent data on expenditure on research and development (R&D) and there were no recent data on researchers and technicians for any of the developing Pacific island countries.

Without relevant data, it will be difficult for developing Pacific Island states to monitor their progress towards Sustainable Development target 9.5, namely: Enhance scientific research, upgrade the technological capabilities of industrial sectors in all countries, in particular developing countries, including, by 2030, encouraging innovation and substantially increasing the number of research and development workers per 1 million people and public and private research and development spending. The two indicators chosen by the United Nations to measure progress are research and development expenditure as a proportion of GDP (9.5.1) and Researchers (in full-time equivalent) per million inhabitants (9.5.2).

Efforts to collate and co-ordinate regional and national data are growing. Such efforts include the PRISM database from the SPC Statistics for Development Division and the national and regional environmental data portals created by countries with the support of the Inform Project.

== National policy issues ==
=== Fiji ===
==== Higher education ====
Fiji, Papua New Guinea and Samoa all consider education to be one of the key policy tools for driving science, technology and innovation, as well as modernization. Fiji, in particular, has made a supreme effort to re-visit existing policies, rules and regulations in this sector. The Fijian government allocates a larger portion of its national budget to education than any other Pacific Island country (4.2% of GDP in 2011), although this is down from 6% of GDP in 2000. The proportion of the education budget allocated to higher education (0.5% of GDP) amounts to 13% of the public education budget. Scholarship schemes like National Toppers, introduced in 2014, and the availability of student loans have made higher education attractive and rewarding in Fiji.

According to an internal investigation into the choice of disciplines in school-leaving examinations (year 13), Fijian students have shown a greater interest in science since 2011. A similar trend can be observed in enrolment figures at all three Fijian universities.

Many Pacific Island countries take Fiji as a benchmark for education. The country draws education leaders from other Pacific Island countries for training and, according to the Ministry of Education, teachers from Fiji are in great demand in these countries.

One important initiative has been the creation of the Higher Education Commission (FHEC) in 2010, the regulatory body in charge of tertiary education in Fiji. FHEC has embarked on registration and accreditation processes for tertiary-level education providers to improve the quality of higher education in Fiji. In 2014, FHEC allocated research grants to universities with a view to enhancing the research culture among faculty.

==== Research and development ====
Fiji is the only developing Pacific Island country with recent data for gross domestic expenditure on research and development (GERD). The national Bureau of Statistics cites a GERD/GDP ratio of 0.15% in 2012. Private-sector research and development (R&D) is negligible. Between 2007 and 2012, government investment in R&D tended to favour agriculture. Scientists publish much more in geosciences and medical sciences than in agricultural sciences, however.

===== Agriculture =====
Food security has been given high priority in the Fiji 2020 Agriculture Sector Policy, as part of a shift from subsistence to commercial agriculture and agro-processing. Strategies outlined in Fiji 2020 include:

- modernizing agriculture in Fiji;
- developing integrated systems for agriculture;
- improving delivery of agricultural support systems;
- enhancing innovative agricultural business models; and
- strengthening the capacity for policy formulation.

Fiji has taken the initiative of shifting away from subsistence agriculture towards commercial agriculture and agro-processing of root crops, tropical fruits, vegetables, spices, horticulture and livestock. In 2013, the Ministry of Agriculture revived Fiji's Agricultural Journal in 2013, which had been dormant for 17 years.

In 2007, agriculture and primary production accounted for just under half of government expenditure on R&D, according to the Fijian National Bureau of Statistics. By 2012, this had risen to almost 60%. Scientists publish much more in the field of geosciences than in agriculture, though. Between 2008 and 2014, agriculture accounted for only 11 out of Fiji's 460 articles catalogued in Thomson Reuters' Web of Science (Science Citation Index Expanded), compared to 85 articles in geosciences.

The rise in government spending on agricultural research has come to the detriment of research in education, which dropped to 35% of total research spending between 2007 and 2012. Government expenditure on health has remained fairly constant, at about 5% of the total for research, according to the Fijian National Bureau of Statistics.

===== Health =====
Over the six years to 2012, government expenditure on health remained fairly constant but low in Fiji, at about 5% of the total for research, according to the Fijian National Bureau of Statistics. This may explain why medical sciences accounted for only 72 out of Fiji's 460 articles catalogued in Thomson Reuters' Web of Science (Science Citation Index Expanded) between 2008 and 2014.

The Fijian Ministry of Health is seeking to develop endogenous research capacity through the Fiji Journal of Public Health, which it launched in 2012. A new set of guidelines are now in place to help build endogenous capacity in health research through training and access to new technology. The new policy guidelines require that all research projects initiated in Fiji with external bodies demonstrate how the project will contribute to local capacity-building in health research.

===== Fisheries =====
The desire to ensure that fisheries remain sustainable is fuelling the drive to use science and technology to make the transition to value-added production. The fisheries sector in Fiji is currently dominated by the catch of tuna for the Japanese market. The Fijian government plans to diversify this sector through aquaculture, inshore fisheries and offshore fish products such as sunfish and deep-water snapper. Accordingly, many incentives and concessions are being offered to encourage the private sector to invest in these areas.

===== ICT sector =====
Fiji has shown substantial growth in access to Internet and mobile phone services. This trend has been supported by its geographical location, service culture, pro-business policies, English-speaking population and well-connected e-society. Relative to many other South Pacific Islands, Fiji has a fairly reliable and efficient telecommunications system with access to the Southern Cross submarine cable linking New Zealand, Australia and North America. A recent move to establish the University of the South Pacific Stathan ICT Park, the Kalabo ICT economic zone and the ATH technology park in Fiji should boost the ICT support service sector in the Pacific region.

=== Papua New Guinea ===
==== Higher education ====
In its Higher Education Plan III 2014–2023, Papua New Guinea sets out a strategy for transforming tertiary education and R&D through the introduction of a quality assurance system and a programme to overcome its limited R&D capacity.

==== Research and development ====
The National Vision 2050 was adopted in 2009. It has led to the establishment of the Research, Science and Technology Council. At its gathering in November 2014, the Council re-emphasized the need to focus on sustainable development through science and technology.

Vision 2050’s medium-term priorities are:

- emerging industrial technology for downstream processing;
- infrastructure technology for the economic corridors;
- knowledge-based technology;
- Science and engineering education; and
- to reach the target of investing 5% of GDP in R&D by 2050.

By 2016, the share of GDP invested in research and development measured just 0.03%.

Between 2008 and 2014, 82% of scientific articles from Papua New Guinea concerned the biological and medical sciences. Less than 10% of the country's 517 articles catalogued in Thomson Reuters' Web of Science (Science Citation Index Expanded) focused on geosciences.

In 2016, women represented 33.2% of the scientists in Papua New Guinea, on par with the global share.

Professor Teatulohi Matainaho serves as Chief Science Advisor to Papua New Guinea, appointed in 2013.

== Sustainable development ==
=== Disaster resilience ===
Countries around the Pacific Rim are seeking ways to link their national knowledge base to regional and global advances in science. One motivation for this greater interconnectedness is the region's vulnerability to geohazards such as earthquakes and tsunamis – the Pacific Rim is not known as the Ring of Fire for nothing. In 2009, Samoa suffered a submarine earthquake of a magnitude of 8.1 on the Richter Scale, the strongest earthquake recorded that year. The subsequent tsunami caused substantial damage and loss of life in Samoa, American Samoa, and Tonga.

The need for greater disaster resilience is inciting countries to develop collaboration in the geosciences.

=== Climate change ===
Climate change is a parallel concern, as the Pacific Rim is also one of the most vulnerable regions to rising sea levels and increasingly capricious weather patterns. In March 2015, for instance, much of Vanuatu was flattened by Cyclone Pam.

Climate change seems to be the most pressing environmental issue for Pacific Island countries, as it is already affecting almost all socio-economic sectors. The consequences of climate change can be seen in agriculture, food security, forestry and even in the spread of communicable diseases. Climate change mostly concerns marine issues, such as the growing frequency and severity of storms, rising sea levels and the increased salinity of soils and groundwater.

The Secretariat of the Pacific Community has initiated several activities to tackle problems associated with climate change. These cover a great variety of areas, including fisheries, freshwater, agriculture, coastal zone management, disaster management, energy, traditional knowledge, education, forestry, communication, tourism, culture, health, weather, gender implications and biodiversity. Almost all Pacific Island countries are involved in one or more of these activities.

The Seventh Pacific Islands Leaders Meeting with Japan in 2015 pledged to establish a Pacific Climate Change Centre. Construction of the centre was completed in Apia, Samoa, in 2019. A shared regional asset, the centre has four mutually reinforcing functions: knowledge brokerage; applied research; capacity-building; and innovation to promote climate change adaptation and mitigation. The government of Samoa, the Pacific Regional Environment Programme and the Japan International Cooperation Agency are all collaborating to deliver 12 courses for trainees from all Pacific Island countries and territories by 2022. The centre also houses a research node of Australia's University of Newcastle in partnership with the Pacific Regional Environment Programme; it has offered PhD scholarships since 2018 and hosts an ‘innovation incubator’. Research undertaken at the centre aligns with the four priority areas defined by the Pacific leaders, namely: climate change resilience; ecosystems and biodiversity protection; waste management; and environmental governance.

==== Pacific Adaptation to Climate Change ====
The first major scheme focusing on adaptation to climate change and climate variability dates back to 2009. Pacific Adaptation to Climate Change involves 13 Pacific Island nations, with international funding from the Global Environment Facility, as well as from the US and Australian governments.

==== Secretariat of the Pacific Region Environment Programme ====
Several projects related to climate change are also being co-ordinated by the United Nations Environment Programme, within the Secretariat of the Pacific Region Environmental Programme (SPREP). The aim of SPREP is to help all members improve their ‘capacity to respond to climate change through policy improvement, implementation of practical adaptation measures, enhancing ecosystem resilience to the impacts of climate change and implementing initiatives aimed at achieving low-carbon development’.

=== Samoa Pathway ===
The blueprint for the subregion's sustainable development over the coming decade is the Samoa Pathway, the action plan adopted by countries at the third United Nations Conference on Small Island Developing States in Apia (Samoa) in September 2014. The Samoa Pathway focuses on, inter alia, sustainable consumption and production; sustainable energy, tourism and transportation; climate change; disaster risk reduction; forests; water and sanitation, food security and nutrition; chemical and waste management; oceans and seas; biodiversity; desertification, land degradation and drought; and health and non-communicable diseases.[1]

=== Forestry ===
Forestry is an important economic resource for Fiji and Papua New Guinea. However, forestry in both countries uses low and semi-intensive technological inputs. As a result, product ranges are limited to sawed timber, veneer, plywood, block board, moulding, poles and posts and wood chips. Only a few limited finished products are exported. Lack of automated machinery, coupled with inadequately trained local technical personnel, are some of the obstacles to introducing automated machinery and design. Policy-makers need to turn their attention to eliminating these barriers, in order for forestry to make a more efficient and sustainable contribution to national economic development.

=== Energy ===
On average, 10% of the GDP of Pacific Island countries funds imports of petroleum products but in some cases this figure can exceed 30%. In addition to high fuel transport costs, this reliance on fossil fuels leaves Pacific economies vulnerable to volatile global fuel prices and potential spills by oil tankers.

Consequently, many Pacific Island countries are convinced that renewable energy will play a role in their socio-economic development. In Fiji, Papua New Guinea, Samoa and Vanuatu, renewable energy sources already represent significant shares of the total electricity supply: 60%, 66%, 37% and 15% respectively. Tokelau has even become the first country in the world to generate 100% of its electricity using renewable sources.

According to the Secretariat of the Pacific Community, renewable energy still represented less than 10% of total energy use in the 22 Pacific Island countries and territories in 2015. The Secretariat of the Pacific Community observed that, 'while Fiji, Papua New Guinea and Samoa are leading the way with large-scale hydropower projects, there is enormous potential to expand the deployment of other renewable energy options such as solar, wind, geothermal and ocean-based energy sources'.

International development partners are participating in several projects to develop renewable energy in the Pacific island states.

==== Cook Islands Renewable Energy Chart Implementation Plan ====
In the Cook Islands, for instance, the Asian Development Bank plans to supply electricity from renewable energy to all inhabited islands by 2020, within the Cook Islands Renewable Energy Chart Implementation Plan for 2012–2020. New solar photovoltaic power plants with lithium-ion batteries were being built on up to six islands of the Southern Group in 2014.

=== Fiji's Rural Electrification Fund ===
The Fiji Rural Electrification Fund will bring affordable solar power and battery storage to 300 rural communities that rely on diesel generators or are without electricity access. Initiated in 2018 and lasting ten years, this fund is a public–private partnership.

=== Vanuatu's National Green Energy Fund ===
To equip its National Energy Road Map 2016–2030, Vanuatu approved the National Green Energy Fund in 2016 with the goal of mobilising US$20 million to provide all households with access to electricity (primarily through individual solar systems) and to improve energy efficiency by 2030. In off-grid areas, households’ access to electricity increased from 9% in 2015 to 64.4% in 2017. The increase was attributed to investments in imported, plug-in solar home systems, supported by the Vanuatu Rural Electrification Project in 2016. However, the share of renewable energy in electricity generation declined from 29% to 18% over the same period, owing in part to a reduction in the use of biofuels in Vanuatu's largest electricity concession in Port Vila.

==== Pacific Centre for Renewable Energy and Energy Efficiency ====
In April 2014, Pacific Ministers for Energy and Transport agreed to establish the Pacific Centre for Renewable Energy and Energy Efficiency, 'a first for the Pacific'. The centre will become part of the United Nations Industrial Development Organization's network of regional Sustainable Energy for All Centres of Excellence, along with centres for the Caribbean Community, Economic Community of West African States, the Southern African Development Community and the East African Community.

The Pacific Centre for Renewable Energy and Energy Efficiency was established in Tonga in 2016 to advise the private sector on related policy matters, provide capacity-building and promote business investment. The centre facilitates a financial mechanism offering competitive grants for start-ups to spur the adoption of renewable energy by the business sector. The centre is part of the Global Network of Regional Sustainable Energy Centres and SIDS DOCK framework designed to attract international investment in the renewable energy sector.

==== Renewable Energy in Pacific Island Countries Developing Skills and Capacity programme ====
Efforts are under way to improve countries’ capacity to produce, conserve and use renewable energy. For example, the European Union has funded the Renewable Energy in Pacific Island Countries Developing Skills and Capacity programme (EPIC). Since its inception in 2013, EPIC has developed two master's programmes in renewable energy management and helped to establish two Centres of Renewable Energy, one at the University of Papua New Guinea and the other at the University of Fiji. Both centres became operational in 2014 and aim to create a regional knowledge hub for the development of renewable energy.

==== Adapting to Climate Change and Sustainable Energy programme ====
In February 2014, the European Union and the Pacific Islands Forum Secretariat signed an agreement for a programme on Adapting to Climate Change and Sustainable Energy worth €37.26 million which will benefit 15 Pacific Island states. These are the Cook Islands, Fiji, Kiribati, Marshall Islands, Federated States of Micronesia, Nauru, Niue, Palau, Papua New Guinea, Samoa, Solomon Islands, Timor-Leste, Tonga, Tuvalu and Vanuatu.

=== Inclusion of traditional knowledge ===
Limited freedom of expression and, in some cases, religious conservatism discourage research in certain areas but the experience of Pacific Island countries shows that sustainable development and a green economy can benefit from the inclusion of traditional knowledge in formal science and technology, as underlined by the Sustainable Development Brief prepared by the Secretariat of the Pacific Community in 2013.

=== Renewable energy targets ===
As part of their Nationally Determined Contributions under the Paris Agreement, the Pacific Island countries are building national renewable energy systems. All 14 countries now have energy strategies, although some extend only to 2020. Nearly all place a strong emphasis on electricity generation using renewable resources.

Progress towards targets for renewable electricity generation in Pacific Island countries, 2018
	Share of electricity generated from renewable sources, 2018 (%)	Target for share of renewables in electricity generation (%)	Timeline for target	Policy framework
Papua New Guinea	62.0	100	2030	National Energy Policy 2016–2020
Fiji	60.0	100	2036	in preparation; see National Energy Policy 2013–2020
Samoa	42.0	100	2017	Energy Sector Plan 2017–2022
Cook Islands	26.0	100	2020	Renewable Electricity Chart 2011–2020
Tuvalu	23.0	100	2020	Master Plan for Renewable Electricity and Energy Efficiency, 2012–2020
Vanuatu	22.0	100	2030	National Energy Road Map 2016–2030
Niue	14.0	80	2025	Strategic Energy Road Map 2015–2025
Tonga	10.0	50	2020	Energy Road Map 2010–2020
Nauru	2.0	50	2020	Energy Road Map 2018–2020
Palau	2.0	45	2025	National Energy Policy 2010–2020
Kiribati	17.0	40	2025	Integrated Energy Roadmap 2017–2025
Micronesia	5.0	30	2020	Energy Master Plans (2018)
Solomon Islands	6.0	20	2020	National Energy Policy (2014)
Marshall Islands	2.0	20	2020	Electricity Roadmap (2018)

== Scientific output in the region ==
=== Trends in scientific authorship ===
According to the Web of Science, Papua New Guinea had the largest number of publications (110) among Pacific Island states in 2014, followed by Fiji (106). Fijian research was concentrated in a handful of scientific disciplines, such as medical sciences, geosciences and biology. Nine out of ten scientific publications from Papua New Guinea focused on immunology, genetics, biotechnology and microbiology.

This pattern contrasts with the trend observed in the French territories of New Caledonia and French Polynesia, where there was a strong emphasis on geosciences: six to eight times the world average for this field.

=== Trends in international co-authorship ===
More than three-quarters of articles published by scientists from Pacific Island nations between 2008 and 2014 were signed by international collaborators, according to Thomson Reuters' Web of Science, Science Citation Index Expanded. International co-authorship was higher for Papua New Guinea and Fiji (90% and 83% respectively) than for New Caledonia and French Polynesia (63% and 56% respectively).

All countries counted North American partners among their top five partners. Fijian research collaboration with North American partners even exceeded that with India, even though a large proportion of Fijians are of Indian origin.

Research partnerships also involved Australia and countries in Europe. Surprisingly, there was little co-authorship with authors based in France, with the notable exception of Vanuatu. Some Pacific Island states counted their neighbours among their closest scientific collaborators, as in the case of the Solomon Islands and Vanuatu.

Many of the smaller Pacific Island states have a near-100% rate of co-authorship This extremely high rate can be a double-edged sword. According to the Fijian Ministry of Health, research collaboration often results in an article being published in a reputed journal but gives very little back in terms of strengthening health in Fiji. A new set of guidelines are now in place in Fiji to help build endogenous capacity in health research through training and access to new technology. The new policy guidelines require that all research projects initiated in Fiji with external bodies demonstrate how the project will contribute to local capacity-building in health research.

Top five foreign collaborators for South Pacific scientists, 2008-2014

	1st collaborator	2nd collaborator	3rd collaborator	4th collaborator	5th collaborator
Australia	USA (43 225)	UK (29 324)	China (21 058)	Germany (15 493)	Canada (12 964)
Fiji	Australia (229)	USA (110)	New Zealand (94)	UK (81)	India (66)
Micronesia, Fed States	USA (26)	Australia (9)	Fiji (8)	Marshall Islands (6)	New Zealand/ Palau (5)
New Zealand	USA (8 853)	Australia (7 861)	UK (6 385)	Germany (3 021)	Canada (2 500)
Papua New Guinea	Australia (375)	USA (197)	UK (103)	Spain (91)	Switzerland (70)
Samoa	USA (5)	Australia (4)	Ecuador/ Spain/ NZ/France/ Costa Rica/Fiji/ Chile/ Japan (1)	-	-
Solomon Islands	Australia (48)	USA (15)	Solomon Is (10)	UK (9)	Fiji (8)
Tonga	Australia (17)	Fiji (13)	New Zealand (11)	USA (9)	France (3)
Vanuatu	France (49)	Australia (45)	USA (24)	Solomon Islands/NZ/ Japan (10)	Japan (8)

Source: UNESCO Science Report: towards 2030 (2015), Figure 27.8. Data from Thomson Reuters' Web of Science, Science Citation Index Expanded, data treatment by Science Metrix

=== A need to focus on local goals ===
Countries are struggling to steer their scientific efforts toward sustainable development, at a time when the United Nations’ Sustainable Development Goals have taken over from the Millennium Development Goals in 2016. It has been suggested that countries could begin by encouraging their scientists to focus more on attaining local goals for sustainable development, rather than on publishing in high-profile international journals on topics that may be of lesser local relevance. The difficulty with this course of action is that the key metrics for recognizing scientific quality are publications and citation data. The answer to this dilemma most likely lies in the need to recognize the global nature of many local development problems. 'We are dealing with problems without boundaries and we underestimate the scale and nature of their consequences at our collective peril. As global citizens, the research and policy communities have an obligation to collaborate and deliver, so arguing for national priorities seems irrelevant'.

=== New scientific journals ===
In 2012, the Fijian Ministry of Health launched the Fiji Journal of Public Health, in an attempt to develop endogenous research capacity. In parallel, the Ministry of Agriculture revived Fiji's Agricultural Journal in 2013, which had been dormant for 17 years.

In addition, two regional journals were launched in 2009 as a focus for Pacific scientific research, the Samoan Medical Journal and the Papua New Guinea Journal of Research, Science and Technology.

== Sources ==
This article incorporates text from a free content work. Licensed under CC-BY-SA IGO 3.0. Text taken from UNESCO Science Report; towards 2030, UNESCO.

- This article incorporates text from a free content work. Licensed under C-BY-SA 3.0 IGO. Text taken from UNESCO Science Report: the Race Against Time for Smarter Development., Schneegans, S., T. Straza and J. Lewis (eds), UNESCO.
