= ECOWAS Policy on Science and Technology =

Science and technology policy

In 2011, the Economic Community of West African States (ECOWAS) adopted a Policy on Science and Technology (ECOPOST).

== An integral part of Vision 2020 ==
ECOPOST is an essential component of the sub region's Vision 2020 Development Plan. Vision 2020 lays out a plan for better governance, faster economic and monetary unification and increased Public-Private Partnerships (PPPs). It supports the planned harmonization of investment regulations in West Africa and advises pushing the establishment of a regional investment promotion agency "with vigour." Countries are being advised to support small and medium-sized enterprises (SMEs), as well as to expose traditional agriculture to modern technology, entrepreneurship and innovation, in order to boost production.

== A framework for national policies ==
ECOPOST provides a framework for member states wishing to improve or elaborate their own national policies and action plans for science, technology and innovation. Moreover, ECOPOST includes a mechanism for monitoring and evaluating the policy's implementation, an aspect often overlooked.

It does not neglect funding, rather it proposes creating a solidarity fund which would be managed by a Directorate within ECOWAS to help countries fund investment in key institutions and improve education and training; the fund would also be used to attract foreign direct investment. As of early 2015, the fund had not yet been established.

The regional policy advocates the development of a science culture in all sectors of society, including through science popularization, the dissemination of research results in local and international journals, the commercialization of research results, greater technology transfer, intellectual property protection, stronger university–industry ties and the enhancement of traditional knowledge.

ECOPOST encourages countries inter align to:

- raise gross domestic expenditure on research and development (GERD) to 1% of GDP, as recommended by the African Union in 2003; in 2013, research intensity averaged 0.3% in West Africa;
- define their own research priorities, so that researchers are working on topics of national interest rather than those proposed by donors;
- create a national S&T fund which would allocate funds to research projects on a competitive basis;
- establish science and innovation prizes;
- define a harmonized regional status for researchers;
- establish a national fund for local innovators which would also help them protect their intellectual property rights;
- adapt university curricula to local industrial needs;
- develop small research and training units in key industrial fields, such as lasers, fiber optics, biotechnology, composite materials and pharmaceuticals;
- equip research laboratories, including with information and communication technologies;
- establish science and technology parks and business incubators;
- help companies specializing in electronics to set up business in their country and develop the use of satellites and remote sensing for telecommunications, environmental monitoring, climatology, meteorology, etc.;
- develop a national capacity to manufacture computer hardware and design software;
- facilitate the spread of modern information technology infrastructure to foster teaching, training and research;
- incite the private sector to finance research and technology through tax incentives and related measures;
- create networks between universities, research institutions and industry to promote collaboration;
- foster clean, sustainable sources of energy and the development of local construction materials;
- establish national and regional databases on research and development activities.

== Context ==
=== Investment in research and development ===
ECOWAS countries still have a long way to go to reach the African Union's target of devoting 1% of GDP to gross domestic expenditure on research and development (GERD). Mali comes closest (0.66% in 2010), followed by Senegal (0.54% in 2010), according to the UNESCO Science Report (2015). They are trailed by Ghana (0.38% in 2010), Nigeria and Togo (0.22% in 2007 and 2012 respectively), Burkina Faso (0.20% in 2009), Gambia (0.13% in 2011) and Cabo Verde (0.07% in 2007). The strong economic growth experienced by the subregion in recent years owing to the commodity boom does, of course, make it harder to improve the GERD/GDP ratio, since GDP keeps rising. Several countries have increased their commitment to research in recent years. Mali devoted just 0.25% of GDP to research and development in 2009, for instance, and Senegal has increased its own research intensity from 0.37% in 2008.

Although the government is the main source of GERD, foreign sources contribute a sizeable chunk in Ghana (31%), Senegal (41%) and Burkina Faso (60%). Gambia receives nearly half of its GERD from private non-profit sources.

GERD tends to be spent mainly in either the government or university sectors, depending on the country, although only Ghana and Senegal have provided data for all four performing sectors. These data reveal that the share of GERD performed by the business enterprise sector in these two countries is negligible. This will need to change if the region is to raise its investment in research and development.

It would be hazardous to extrapolate to the entire subregion without recent data for more than seven countries, but the available data does suggest a shortage of qualified personnel. Only Senegal stands out, with 361 full-time equivalent researchers per million inhabitants in 2010, according to the UNESCO Institute for Statistics. Next come Cabo Verde (51), Burkina Faso (48), Ghana and Nigeria (39), Togo (36) and Mali (32). The data for Nigeria date from 2007, for Cabo Verde from 2011 and, for Togo, from 2012. The world average in 2014 was 176 per million inhabitants.

Despite policies promoting gender equality, women's participation in research remains low. Cabo Verde, Senegal and Nigeria have some of the best ratios: around one in three (Cabo Verde) and one in four researchers. Concerning the sector of employment, the surprise comes from Mali, where half (49%) of researchers were working in the business enterprise sector in 2010, according to the UNESCO Institute for Statistics.

=== Impact of science and technology in West Africa ===
The agriculture sector suffers from chronic underinvestment in West Africa. By 2010, only Burkina Faso, Mali, Niger and Senegal had raised public expenditure to 10% of GDP, the target fixed by the Maputo Declaration (2003). Gambia, Ghana and Togo were on the threshold of reaching this target. Nigeria devoted 6% of GDP to agriculture and the remaining West African countries less than 5%.

Other underdeveloped areas are the water, sanitation and electricity sectors, which hold potential for public–private partnerships. The situation is most urgent in Benin, Ghana, Guinea and Niger, where less than 10% of the population enjoyed improved sanitation in 2011. Although people have greater access to clean water than to sanitation, this basic commodity still eludes more than half of the population in most countries. Access to electricity varies widely, from 13% in Burkina Faso to 72% in Ghana (2011 figures).

Internet penetration has also been slow in West Africa, contrary to mobile phone subscriptions. As of 2013, 5% of the population or less had access to internet in Benin, Burkina Faso, Côte d'Ivoire, Guinea-Bissau, Liberia, Mali, Niger, Sierra Leone and Togo. Only Cabo Verde and Nigeria could provide one in three citizens with internet connections.

Why has the research sector had so little impact on technological progress in West Africa? Apart from obvious factors like underinvestment, this situation has resulted from the relatively low political commitment to science, technology and innovation on the part of individual countries. There is a lack of national research and innovation strategies or policies with a clear definition of measurable targets and the role to be played by each stakeholder; a lack of involvement by private companies in the process of defining national research needs, priorities and programmes; and a lack of institutions devoted to innovation that can make the link between research and development.

The low impact of science and technology in West Africa has also resulted from the differences in education systems, the lack of convergence among research programmes and the low level of exchanges and collaboration between universities and research institutions. The centres of excellence established since 2012 by the West African Economic and Monetary Union (WAEMU) and within a World Bank project should help to foster collaboration and the dissemination of research results, as well as a greater convergence among research programmes.

In education, the three-tiered degree system (bachelor's –master's–PhD) has now been generalized to most West African countries. In the case of WAEMU countries, this is largely thanks to the Support to Higher Education, Science and Technology Project, funded by a grant from the African Development Bank. Between 2008 and 2014, WAEMU invested US$36 million in this reform.

=== Moves to improve data collection ===
Countries are being encouraged to collaborate with the ECOWAS Commission to enhance data collection. Out of the 13 countries involved in the initial phase of the African Science, Technology and Innovation Indicators Initiative (ASTII), only four from ECOWAS countries contributed to the first data collection on research for the African Innovation Outlook (2011). These countries include Ghana, Mali, Nigeria, and Senegal. ASTII, launched in 2007 by the African Union's New Partnership for Africa's Development (NEPAD), aims to improve research data collection and analysis.

While ECOWAS had a stronger presence in the second African Innovation Outlook compared to the first edition, there is still room for more participation and reporting from member states. Only six of ECOWAS's nineteen member countries - Burkina Faso, Cabo Verde, Ghana, Mali, Senegal and Togo - contributed data on research and development activities. Notably missing was Nigeria, and just Ghana and Senegal provided complete information across all four assessed sectors of innovation performance. Broader involvement and reporting from within the economic community would shine a brighter light on trends and possibilities for advancement. Overall participation from ECOWAS members needs to increase to give a fuller picture of innovation in the region and where efforts could focus.

ECOWAS took actions in recent years to address weaknesses in technological application stemming from research. In 2013 and 2014, the organization held subregional workshops for member countries focused on science, technology and innovation metrics as well as drafting research proposals. These trainings aimed to build skills in evaluating innovation progress. Additionally, in 2012 ECOWAS research ministers adopted the ECOWAS Research Policy during a meeting in Cotonou, Benin. This helped lay out a unified strategy. Through workshops and new coordinating policies, ECOWAS has worked to tackle challenges limiting the societal impact of research activities in the subregion.

== Sources ==
This article incorporates text from a free content work. Licensed under CC-BY-SA IGO 3.0. Text taken from UNESCO Science Report: towards 2030, UNESCO, UNESCO Publishing.
