= E-society =

E-society, or "electronic society", is a society that consists of one or more e-Communities involved in the areas from e-Government, e-Democracy, and e-Business to e-Learning and e-Health, that use electronic information and communication technologies (ICT) in order to achieve a common interests and goals. Just as "e-mail" stands for "electronic mail" and signifies a transition of mail to electronic means, "e-Society" signifies a transition of society in general, and how one interacts and functions within it, towards a reliance on electronic means. The first areas of e-society that emerged were e-Learning and e-Business. Further development and challenges of e-Society depend on the use of new ICT technology and IoT in supporting smart media and smart information services.

The development of e-Society is relying and depending on the development of virtual reality (VR) technologies that insure interaction between participants of an e-Society in a more acceptable and tangible way. The development of (VR) and consequently the e-Society is based on improvement and balancing of participants’ interaction methods, hardware necessary for such interaction, content presentation and effort required for development and maintenance.
