= Research and development intensity =

Expenditures on a firm's research and development divided by its sales

Since the 1960s, private businesses in the U.S. have provided an increasing share of funding for research and development, as direct federal funding waned.

Research and development intensity (R&D intensity) is generally defined as expenditures by a firm on its research and development (R&D) divided by the firm's sales. There are two types of R&D intensity: direct and indirect. R&D intensity varies, in general, according to a firm's industry sector, product knowledge, manufacturing, and technology, and is a metric that can be used to gauge the level of a company's investment to spur innovation in and through basic and applied research. A further aim of R&D spending, ultimately, is to increase productivity (e.g., factor productivity) as well as an organization's salable output.

== Definition and aim of metric ==
Generally speaking, R&D is seen as a main driver of societal and business innovation. The OECD's Frascati Manual describes R&D as "creative work undertaken on a systematic basis in order to increase the stock of knowledge, including knowledge of man, culture and society, and the use of this stock of knowledge to devise new applications."

R&D expenditure and R&D intensity are two of the key indicators used to monitor resources devoted to science and technology worldwide. R&D intensity has been defined as "the ratio of expenditures by a firm on research and development to the firm's sales." William Leonard has described research intensity as "measured usually by ratios of scientific personnel to total employment or by R&D expenditures/sales" to gains in such variables as productivity, profits, sales, and asset status. R&D intensity is therefore a measure of a company's R&D spending toward activities aimed at expanding sector and product knowledge, manufacturing, and technology, and so aimed at spurring innovation in and through basic and applied research. Furthermore, it is aimed at increasing "factor productivity and salable output".

There are two types of R&D intensity, calculated as follows:

- Direct R&D intensity, calculated by dividing R&D expenditure by output
- Indirect R&D intensity, which quantifies the R&D expenditure embodied in the intermediate goods used in the production of another sector and can be calculated using Input-Output Tables

== In enterprises and companies ==
As the National Science Foundation explains: absolute levels of "R&D expenditures indicate the level of effort dedicated to producing future products and process improvements while maintaining current market share and increasing operating efficiency. By extension, such expenditures may reflect firms' perceptions of the market's demand for new and improved technology." However, R&D intensity is the most frequently used measure "to gauge the relative importance of R&D across industries and among firms in the same industry." Economic research on sixteen industries by William Leonard, "the relation [between investment and gains] appears two years after R&D spending and increases thereafter", although research intensity relates "less effectively" to "manpower ratios [ratios of scientific personnel to total employment]."

== Among sectors ==
R&D intensity differs between different sectors: high-tech sectors (such as aircraft & spacecraft, electrical equipment, and pharmaceuticals) are characterized by the highest R&D intensity, while low-tech sectors (such as food products, iron and steel, and textiles) usually have low R&D intensity. In fact, R&D intensity could be used as the sole indicator to identify high-tech sectors.

== By countries and regions ==
R&D intensity for a country or larger political or geographical entity is defined as its R&D expenditure as a percentage of gross domestic product (GDP) of the entity. Generally speaking, developed countries have higher R&D intensities than developing countries. As Eurostat noted in 2013, for a preceding period,

The European Union (EU) is currently lagging behind both the USA and Japan in terms of expenditure on R&D as a proportion of GDP, primarily due to slow relative growth in business R&D expenditure. The European Council set an overall target of 3% of GDP by the year 2010, with industry asked to contribute two thirds of this objective.

GERD can be broken down among four sectors of performance: business enterprise, higher education, government, and private not-for-profit institutions serving households (PNP).

The following is a list of countries by business research and development intensity as a percentage of value added in the industry, published by the WIPO in 2023.

* indicates "Science and technology in COUNTRY or TERRITORY" links.

Country	Business R&D intensity	Relative size
Israel *	6.02	
South Korea *	5.21	
United States *	3.59	
Belgium *	3.43	
Sweden *	3.41	
Japan *	3.40	
Switzerland *	3.31	
Austria	3.20	
Germany *	3.13	
Finland	2.96	
United Kingdom *	2.90	
Denmark *	2.89	
Iceland *	2.66	
China *	2.43	
Netherlands	2.30	
France *	2.18	
Singapore	2.16	
Slovenia	2.11	
Czech Republic	1.96	
Estonia	1.78	
Canada *	1.71	
Portugal *	1.70	
Australia *	1.66	
Norway	1.56	
United Arab Emirates	1.50	
Greece *	1.49	
New Zealand *	1.47	
Poland *	1.46	
Spain *	1.44	
Croatia	1.43	
Hungary *	1.39	
Italy *	1.33	
Turkey *	1.32	
Thailand *	1.21	
Brazil *	1.15	
Hong Kong	1.07	
Lithuania *	1.02	
Egypt *	1.02	
Slovakia *	0.98	
Luxembourg	0.98	
Serbia	0.97	
Ireland	0.96	
Malaysia *	0.95	
Russia *	0.94	
Iran *	0.79	
Bulgaria *	0.77	
Cyprus	0.77	
Latvia	0.76	
Rwanda	0.76	
Tunisia	0.75	
Jordan *	0.69	
Malta *	0.69	
Qatar *	0.68	
India *	0.65	
South Africa *	0.60	
Senegal	0.58	
Argentina *	0.55	
Algeria	0.53	
Belarus	0.48	
Saudi Arabia	0.46	
Romania *	0.46	
Ecuador	0.44	
Vietnam *	0.42	
Uruguay	0.42	
Kenya	0.41	
North Macedonia	0.38	
Montenegro	0.36	
Namibia	0.35	
Chile *	0.34	
Ukraine *	0.33	
Philippines	0.32	
Mozambique	0.31	
Mauritius	0.31	
Nigeria	0.28	
Indonesia *	0.28	
Brunei	0.28	
Oman	0.28	
Ethiopia *	0.27	
Costa Rica	0.27	
Mexico *	0.27	
Burkina Faso *	0.25	
Georgia	0.24	
Moldova	0.23	
Burundi	0.21	
Armenia *	0.21	
Colombia *	0.20	
Togo	0.20	
Bosnia and Herzegovina	0.19	
Panama	0.18	
Mali	0.17	
Pakistan *	0.16	
Peru	0.16	
El Salvador	0.16	
Uzbekistan *	0.16	
Azerbaijan *	0.15	
Paraguay	0.14	
Uganda *	0.14	
Kazakhstan *	0.12	
Cambodia *	0.12	
Sri Lanka *	0.12	
Nicaragua	0.11	
Bahrain *	0.10	
Tajikistan *	0.09	
Mongolia	0.09	
Kuwait *	0.08	
Kyrgyzstan *	0.08	
Ivory Coast *	0.07	
Honduras	0.06	
Guatemala	0.06	
Trinidad and Tobago *	0.05	
Myanmar	0.04	
Angola	0.03	
Madagascar	0.01	
Mauritania	0.01	

== See also ==
- Innovation
- Research and Development
- List of countries by research and development spending
