= Economy of Ivory Coast =

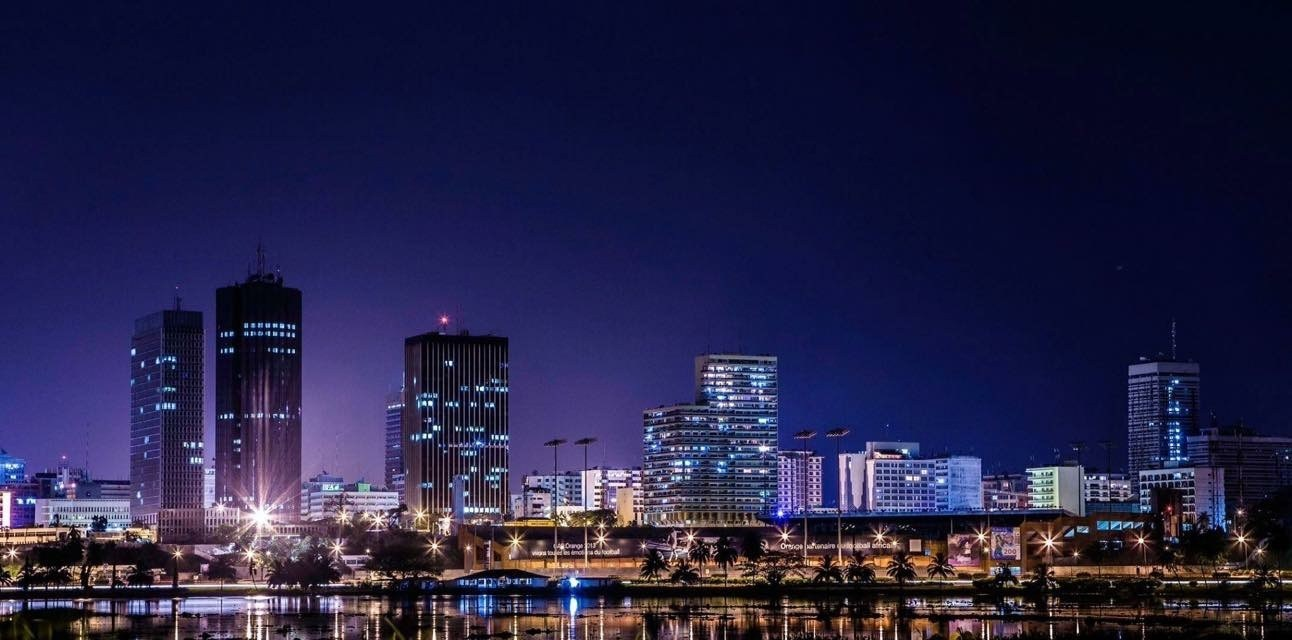
- Skyline of the Plateau district, the CBD of Abidjan, the economic capital of Côte d'Ivoire
- Currency: West African CFA franc (XOF, CFA)
- Fixed exchange rates: 655.957 CFA francs per euro
- Fiscal year: Calendar year
- Trade organisations: AU, AfCFTA, WTO, ECOWAS, WAEMU
- Country group: Developing/Emerging; Lower-middle income economy

Statistics
- Population: ▲29,344,847
- GDP: ▲$95.46 billion (nominal; 2025); ▲$264.99 billion (PPP; 2025)
- GDP rank: 75th (nominal; 2025); 72nd (PPP; 2024)
- GDP growth: 6.4% (2025f)
- GDP per capita: ▲$2,900 (nominal; 2025); ▲$8,060 (PPP; 2025)
- GDP per capita rank: 140th (nominal, 2021); 133rd (PPP, 2021)
- GDP per capita growth: 3.5% (2024)
- GDP by sector: agriculture: 20.1%; industry: 26.6%; services: 53.3%; (2017 est.)
- Inflation (CPI): 2.0% (2020 est.)
- Population below national poverty line: 39.5% (2018 est.); 81% on less than $8.30/day (2021)
- Gini coefficient: 41.5 medium (2015)
- Human Development Index: ▲0.582 medium (2023) (157th); 0.331 IHDI (2018)
- Labour force: ▲8,583,001 (2019); ▼54.2% employment rate (2017)
- Labour force by occupation: agriculture: 68% (2007 est.)
- Unemployment: 9.4% (2013 est.)
- Main industries: foodstuffs, beverages; wood products, oil refining, gold mining, truck and bus assembly, textiles, fertilizer, building materials, electricity

External
- Exports: ▲$16.326 billion (2018 est.)
- Export goods: cocoa beans, gold, rubber, refined petroleum, crude petroleum
- Main export partners: Netherlands 10.7%; United States 6.0%; France 5.9%; Malaysia 5.0%; Vietnam 4.9%; Mali 4.8%; Spain 4.8%; Switzerland 4.7%; Germany 4.7%; Burkina Faso 4.6%; (2019)
- Imports: ▲$14.248 billion (2018 est.)
- Import goods: crude petroleum, rice, frozen fish, refined petroleum, packaged medicines
- Main import partners: China 17.2%; Nigeria 13.5%; France 10.7%; USA 5.0%; India 4.3%; (2019)
- FDI stock: ▲$10.234 billion ( 2018 est.); Abroad: N/A ( 2018 est.)
- Current account: ▼ −$1.86 billion (2017 est.)
- Gross external debt: ▲$13.07 billion (31 December 2017 est.)

Public finance
- Government debt: 47% of GDP (2017 est.)
- Foreign reserves: ▲$6.257 billion (31 December 2017 est.)
- Budget balance: −4.2% (of GDP) (2017 est.)
- Revenue: 7.749 billion (2017 est.)
- Spending: 9.464 billion (2017 est.)
- Economic aid: recipient: ODA, $1 billion (1996 est.)
- Credit rating: Moody's; Ba3 (stable); Fitch; B+ (stable)
- All values, unless otherwise stated, are in US dollars.

Ivory Coast has a developing economy. It is stable and currently growing, in the aftermath of political instability in recent decades. The economy is largely market-based and depends heavily on the agricultural sector. Almost 70% of the Ivorian people are engaged in some form of agricultural activity. The economy grew 82% in the 1960s, reaching a peak growth of 360% in the 1970s, but this proved unsustainable and it shrank by 28% in the 1980s and a further 22% in the 1990s. This decline, coupled with high population growth, resulted in a steady fall in living standards. The gross national product per capita, now rising again, was about US$727 in 1996. It was substantially higher two decades before. Real GDP growth is expected to average 6.5% in 2024–25.

After several years of lagging performance, the Ivorian economy began a comeback in 1994, due to the devaluation of the CFA franc and improved prices for cocoa and coffee, growth in non-traditional primary exports such as pineapples and rubber, limited trade and banking liberalization, offshore oil and gas discoveries, and generous external financing and debt rescheduling by multilateral lenders and France. The 50% devaluation of franc zone currencies on 12 January 1994 caused a one-time jump in the inflation rate to 26% in 1994, but the rate fell sharply from 1996–1999. Moreover, government adherence to donor-mandated reforms led to a jump in growth to 5% annually in 1996–99. A majority of the population remains dependent on smallholder cash crop production.

== Infrastructure ==
In comparison to other developing countries, Ivory Coast has strong infrastructure. There is a network of more than 13,000 kilometres (8,000 mi) of paved roads; modern telecommunications services, including a public data communications network; cellular phones and Internet access; two active ports, one of which, Abidjan, is the most modern in West Africa; rail links (in the process of being upgraded) both within the country and to Burkina Faso; regular air service within the region and to and from Europe; and real estate developments for commercial, industrial, retail, and residential use. Ivory Coast's location and connections to neighboring countries makes it a preferred platform for foreigners to conduct West African business operations. The city of Abidjan is one of the most modern and liveable cities in the region.

The government's public investment plan accords priority to investment in human capital, and to provide for significant spending on the economic infrastructure needed to sustain growth.

In the new environment of government disengagement from productive activities and in the wake of recent privatizations, anticipated investments in the petroleum, electricity, water, and telecommunications sectors, and in part of the transport sector, will be financed without any direct government intervention.

Mean wages were $1.05 per man-hour in 2009.

== Agriculture ==
Ivory Coast produced, in 2018:

- 7.2 million tonnes of yam (3rd largest producer in the world, only behind Nigeria and Ghana)
- 5 million tons of cassava (14th largest producer in the world)
- 2.1 million tons of palm oil
- 2.1 million tons of rice
- 1.9 million tons of cocoa (largest producer in the world)
- 1.9 million tons of sugar cane
- 1.8 million tons of plantain (8th largest producer in the world)
- 1 million tons of maize
- 688 thousand tons of cashew nuts (3rd largest producer in the world, behind Vietnam and India)
- 461 thousand tons of natural rubber
- 397 thousand tons of banana
- 316 thousand tons of cotton

This is in addition to smaller productions of other agricultural products, like coffee (88 thousand tons) and pineapple (50 thousand tons).

Ivory Coast is among the world's largest producers and exporters of cocoa beans and palm oil. Consequently, the economy is highly sensitive to fluctuations in international prices for these products and to weather conditions. Despite attempts by the government to diversify the economy, it is still largely dependent on agriculture and related activities. Forced labor by children bought and sold as slaves are endemic in cacao production.

== Energy ==
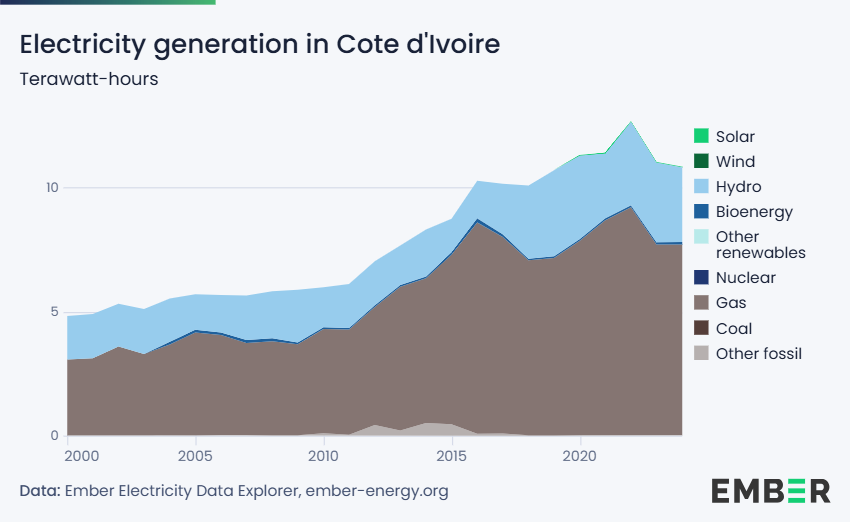
Electricity generation in Ivory Coast in terawatt-hours

Côte d'Ivoire's energy supply relies on several hydroelectric stations and gas-to-power plants that make use of the country's hydraulic and natural gas resources. Over recent years, the country has also sought to develop its solar industry and is setting up several solar PV plants to diversify its energy mix.

Côte d'Ivoire also holds oil and natural gas resources offshore, though production has remained small compared to other African neighbours such as Ghana or Nigeria. For example, in 2021, it only produced about 25,000 barrels of oil per day.

Since 2021, the Italian energy company Eni has made multiple oil and gas discoveries in the offshore Baleine Field and begun their development. In December 2024, its production facilities there entered their second phase, generating 70m cubic feet of gas and 60,000 barrels of oil per day.

== Mining ==
In 2019, the country was the 9th largest world producer of manganese.

In the production of gold, in 2017 the country produced 20.3 tons.

== Rubber ==
Ivory Coast has emerged as a significant player in the global rubber market. In 2022, the nation produced 1.55 million tonnes of natural rubber, surpassing Vietnam to become the world's third-largest producer. This significant increase from 815,000 tonnes in 2019 can be attributed to several factors, including a shift by Ivorian farmers from cacao to rubber cultivation. This shift is driven by the potential benefits of European sustainability regulations, which will take effect in 2025.

== Tourism ==
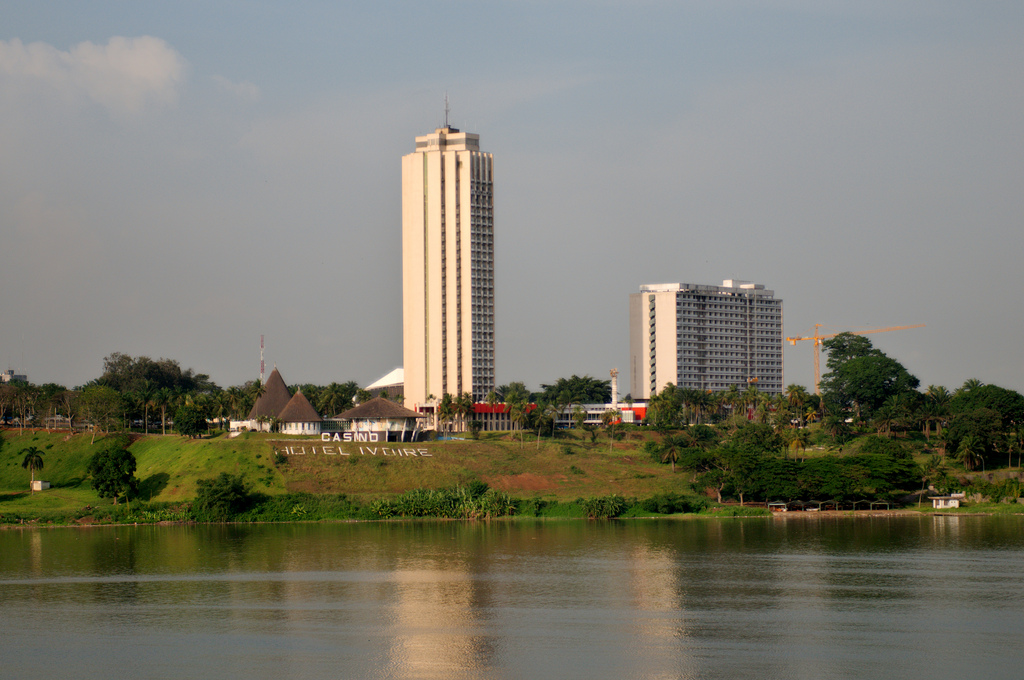
Hotel Ivoire in Abidjan includes a casino.

Ivory Coast has made progress in diversifying its economy, and since the 1970s, has steadily expanded the facilities offered to tourists. Resort lodgings in coastal areas have been developed. There are numerous hotels in Abidjan, including international chains such as Novotel and Sofitel.

== External trade and investment ==
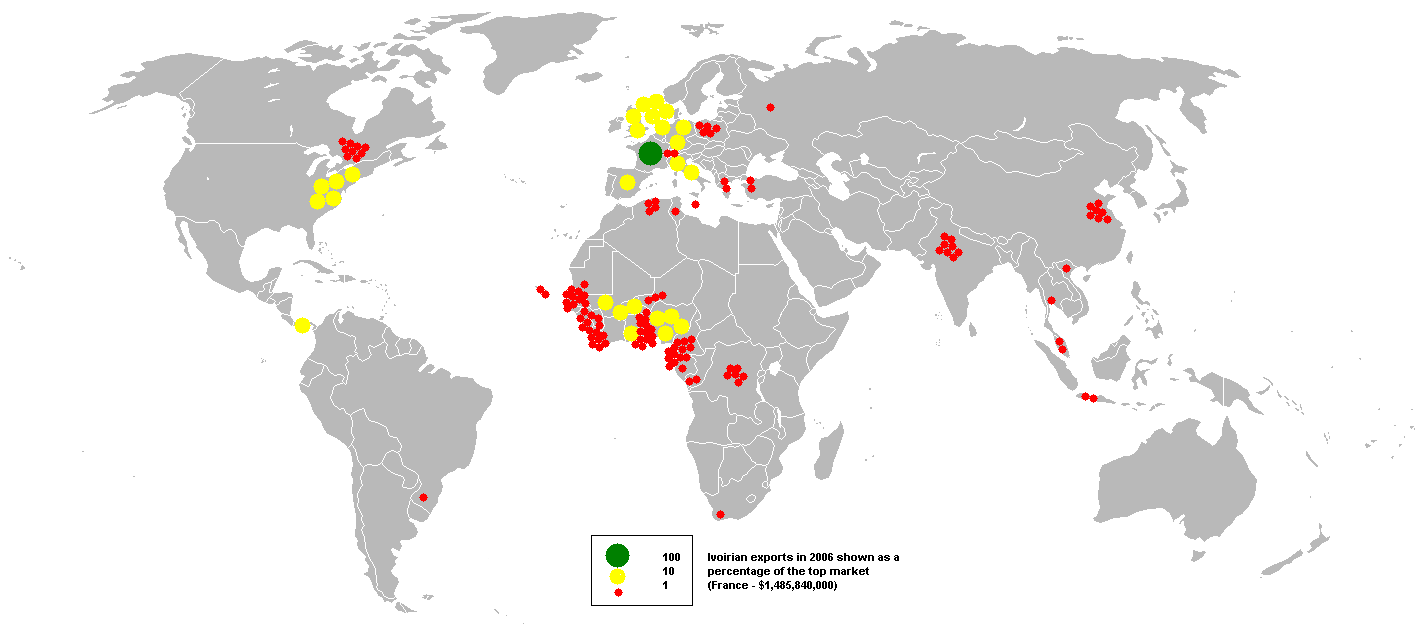
Ivoirian exports in 2006

Foreign direct investment (FDI) plays a key role in the Ivorian economy, accounting for between 40% and 45% of total capital in Ivorian firms. France is overwhelmingly the most important foreign investor. In recent years, French investment has accounted for about one-quarter of the total capital in Ivorian enterprises, and between 55% and 60% of the total stock of foreign investment capital.

The stock market capitalisation of listed companies in Ivory Coast was $2,327 million in 2005 by the World Bank.

In March 2025, Côte d'Ivoire was scheduled to carry out its first bond issue in CFA Francs on the international market.

Maritime cargo to or from Côte d'Ivoire must be covered by a bordereau de suivi des cargaisons (BSC), an electronic cargo tracking note administered by the Office ivoirien des chargeurs (OIC), the national shippers' council. It was introduced by Decree 95-820 of 29 September 1995 and covers maritime traffic in both directions; it is created online by the exporter or the export forwarder in the country of shipment before the goods move by sea, and is validated within 24 working hours of the request. Under a customs circular of 3 May 2006 it is a condition for the admissibility of a customs declaration.

Import and export formalities are processed through the Guichet Unique du Commerce Extérieur (GUCE), a single-window platform on which declarations and supporting documents are filed electronically.

== Economic data ==
=== Main indicators ===
The following table shows the main economic indicators in 1980–2026. Inflation below 5% is in green. Figures for 2025 include IMF estimates; figures for 2026 are IMF projections.

Year	GDP (in billion US$ PPP)	GDP per capita (in US$ PPP)	GDP (in billion US$ nominal)	GDP growth (real)	Inflation (in percent)	Government debt (in % of GDP)
1980	20.3	2,583	13.9	▲5.2%	▲8.8%	n/a
1985	▲26.9	▲2,871	▼9.5	▲3.6%	▲1.8%	n/a
1990	▲33.7	▲3,048	▲14.9	▼−1.1%	▼−0.7%	n/a
1995	▲40.1	▼2,879	▲15.2	▲5.6%	▲14.1%	n/a
2000	▲52.0	▲3,199	▼14.9	▼−2.1%	▲2.5%	74%
2005	▲58.3	▼3,116	▲23.6	▲1.7%	▲3.9%	▼58%
2006	▲61.0	▲3,170	▲24.6	▲1.5%	▲2.5%	▼58%
2007	▲63.8	▲3,221	▲28.2	▲1.8%	▲1.9%	▼54%
2008	▲66.7	▲3,273	▲33.6	▲2.5%	▲1.7%	▼51%
2009	▲69.3	▲3,306	▲33.7	▲3.3%	▲0.5%	▼47%
2010	▲71.5	▲3,319	▲34.4	▲2.0%	▲1.8%	▼46%
2011	▼69.5	▼3,133	▲35.5	▼−4.9%	▲4.9%	▲50%
2012	▲78.4	▲3,440	▲37.0	▲10.9%	▲1.3%	▼25%
2013	▲87.2	▲3,717	▲43.2	▲9.3%	▲2.6%	▼25%
2014	▲96.5	▲3,999	▲48.9	▲8.8%	▲0.5%	▲27%
2015	▲106.0	▲4,271	▼45.8	▲8.8%	▲1.1%	▲29%
2016	▲114.7	▲4,493	▲48.4	▲7.2%	▲0.8%	▲31%
2017	▲125.4	▲4,776	▲52.5	▲7.4%	▲0.7%	▲33%
2018	▲135.8	▲5,030	▲58.5	▲4.8%	▲0.6%	▲35%
2019	▲155.5	▲5,599	▲60.4	▲6.7%	▲0.8%	▲37%
2020	▲160.3	▲5,610	▲63.1	▲0.7%	▲2.3%	▲46%
2021	▲179.2	▲6,097	▲72.8	▲7.1%	▲4.2%	▲50%
2022	▲204.2	▲6,755	▼71.1	▲6.4%	▲5.2%	▲56%
2023	▲225.7	▲7,260	▲80.8	▲6.6%	▲4.4%	▲57%
2024	▲245.3	▲7,669	▲87.1	▲6.0%	▲3.4%	▲60%
2025	▲268.6	▲8,165	▲98.9	▲6.5%	▲0.1%	▼56%
2026	▲293.4	▲8,672	▲112.1	▲6.2%	▲1.8%	▼55%

=== Other data ===
GDP – composition by sector: agriculture: 17.4% industry: 28.8% services: 53.8% (2017 est.)

Labor force: 8.747 million (60% agricultural) (2017 est.)

Unemployment rate: 9.4% (2013 est.)

Population below poverty line: 46.3% (2015 est.)

Household income or consumption by percentage share: lowest 10%: 2.2% highest 10%: 31.8% (2008)

Distribution of family income – Gini index: 41.5 (2008)

Investment (gross fixed): 8.7% of GDP (2005 est.)

Budget: revenues: $7.121 billion, expenditures: $8.886 billion (2017 est.)

Agriculture – products: coffee, cocoa beans, bananas, palm kernels, corn, rice, manioc (tapioca), sweet potatoes, sugar, cotton, rubber; timber

Industries: foodstuffs, beverages; wood products, oil refining, gold mining, truck and bus assembly, textiles, fertilizer, building materials, electricity

Industrial production growth rate: 7% (2017 est.)

Electricity – production: 8.262 billion kWh (2015 est.)

Electricity – consumption: 5.669 billion kWh (2015 est.)

Electricity – exports: 872 million kWh (2015 est.)

Electricity – imports: 23 million kWh (2015 est.)

Oil – production: 30,000 bbl/day (2016 est.)

Oil – consumption: 20,000 bbl/d (3,200 m^{3}/d) (2003 est.)

Oil – exports: 34,720 bbl/day (2014 est.)

Oil – imports: 65,540 bbl/day (2014 est.)

Oil – proved reserves: 100 million bbl (1 January 2017 est.)

Natural gas – production: 2.063 billion cu m (2015 est.)

Natural gas – consumption: 2.063 billion cu m (2015 est.)

Natural gas – exports: 0 cu m (2013 est.)

Natural gas – imports: 0 cu m (2013 est.)

Natural gas – proved reserves: 28.32 billion cu m (1 January 2017 est.)

Current account balance: $-$490 million (2017 est.)

Exports: $11.08 billion (2017 est.)

Exports – commodities: cocoa, coffee, timber, petroleum, cotton, bananas, pineapples, palm oil, fish

Exports – partners: Netherlands 11.8%, US 7.9%, France 6.4%, Belgium 6.4%, Germany 5.8%, Burkina Faso 4.5%, India 4.4%, Mali 4.2% (2017)

Imports: $8.789 billion (2017 est.)

Imports – commodities: fuel, capital equipment, foodstuffs

Imports – partners: Nigeria 15%, France 13.4%, China 11.3%, US 4.3% (2017)

Reserves of foreign exchange and gold: $4.688 billion (31 December 2017 est.)

Debt – external: $12.38 billion (31 December 2017 est.)

Economic aid – recipient: ODA, $1 billion (1996 est.)

Currency (code): Communaute Financiere Africaine franc (XOF); note – responsible authority is the Central Bank of the West African States

Exchange rates: Communaute Financiere Africaine francs (XOF) per US dollar – 594.3 (2017 est.) 593.01 (2016 est.) 593.01 (2015 est.) 591.45 (2014 est.) 494.42 (2013 est.)

Fiscal year: calendar year

== See also ==
- Agriculture in Ivory Coast
- Pineapple production in Ivory Coast
- Transport in Ivory Coast
- Politics of Ivory Coast
- Departments of Ivory Coast
- Geography of Ivory Coast
- Demographics of Ivory Coast
- Economy of Africa
- Child labor in cocoa production
- United Nations Economic Commission for Africa
