= Science and technology in Ivory Coast =

In Ivory Coast, a country in West Africa, scientific output has been relatively modest. Scientists in Ivory Coast produced only 10 scholarly articles per million inhabitants in international journals in 2014, compared to a continental average of 20 per million. Between 2008 and 2014, scientists published mostly in biological sciences, followed by medical sciences, geosciences, agriculture and chemistry (in that order). The country also has few international collaborations, compared to the rest of the continent: whereas more than eight out of ten articles had a foreign co-author in most countries in 2014, the rate in Ivory Coast was 73%.

As of 2015, Ivory Coast did not have a dedicated policy for science, technology and innovation. Related policies are implemented by the Ministry of Higher Education and Scientific Research. The main planning body is the Directorate General of Scientific Research and Technological Innovation and its technical directorate.

Some targets of the National Development Plan require recourse to science and technology. The share of the National Development Plan to 2015 devoted to scientific research remains modest; within the section on greater wealth creation and social equity (63.8% of the total budget for the Plan), just 1.2% is allocated to scientific research.

The following structures foster innovation and technology transfer: the Department for the Promotion of Research and Technological Innovation, the Ivorian Organization for Intellectual Property, the Centre for the Demonstration and Promotion of Technologies, and the Ivorian Society of Tropical Technology. Research and innovation are promoted and funded by the National Agricultural Investment Programme (est. 2010), the Policy Support Programme for Scientific Research (est. 2007), the Interprofessional Fund for Agricultural Research and Advice (est. 2002), the National Fund for Scientific and Technological Research (yet to be established) and the Ivorian Fund for the Development of National Enterprises (est. 1999).

There are also several subregional centers that relate to Ivory Coast: the ECOWAS Centre for Renewable Energy and Energy Efficiency, the West African Biosciences Network, the five African Institutes for Mathematical Sciences, and the West Africa Institute.

Ivory Coast is a member of the Economic Community of West African States (ECOWAS), which adopted a Policy on Science and Technology (ECOPOST) in 2011. ECOPOST advocates the development of a more scientific culture in all sectors of society, including through science popularization, the dissemination of research results in local and international journals, the commercialization of research results, greater technology transfer, intellectual property protection, stronger university–industry ties, and the enhancement of traditional knowledge.

In 2015, the United States of America decided to invest US$1,000,000,000 over the next five years in preventing, detecting and responding to future infectious disease outbreaks in 17 countries, including Ivory Coast. This substantial investmret aimre to strregthre threcapacity of Ivory Coast and other nations to effectively combat the threats posed by infectious diseases and improve global health security.

== Socio-economic context ==
=== Access to basic services ===
In 2014, Ivory Coast had a population of 20.8 million that was growing at a rapid rate of 2.4% per year. Ivory Coast ranked 47th on the Ibrahim Index of African Governance. In 2011, three-quarters (76%) of the population had access to clean water, 59% to electricity, 15% to sanitation and just 2.6% access to Internet.

In 2013, the services sector contributed more than half (56%) of GDP, compared to 22% for agriculture and 22% for industry. Within industry, manufacturing contributed 13% of GDP, one of the highest ratios in West Africa. Three products accounted for more than half of exports: cocoa beans (32% of exports), petroleum and other oils (12%) and natural rubber (7%).

=== National Development Plan ===
Ivory Coast recorded economic growth of 8.7% in 2013 after entering recession in 2011 at the height of the political crisis engendered by President Laurent Gbagbo's decision to contest the electoral result. With the political crisis now over, the government of President Alassane Ouattara has vowed to restore the country to its former leading role in Sub-Saharan Africa. The National Development Plan for 2012–2015 has two primary objectives: to achieve double-digit growth by 2014 and to turn Ivory Coast into an upper middle-income country by 2020. A second national development plan was under preparation in 2015 for 2016–2020.

The budget for the National Development Plan to 2015 is broken down into five strategic areas: greater wealth creation and social equity (63.8%), provision of quality social services for vulnerable populations, particularly women and children (14.6%), good governance and the restoration of peace and security (9.6%), a healthy environment (9.4%) and the repositioning of Ivory Coast on the regional and international scenes (1.8%).

Key targets of the National Development Plan requiring recourse to science and technology include:

- rehabilitation of the railway linking Abidjan to Burkina Faso’s border, rehabilitation and extension of the ports of Abidjan and San Pédro, creation of a new airline company (infrastructure and transport);
- increasing the productivity of yam, banana plantain and manioc by at least 15% (agriculture).
- creation of two transformation units for iron and manganese and one for gold refining (mining).
- construction of the Soubré dam, electrification of 200 rural communities each year (energy).
- establishment and equipping of three technopoles to promote innovation, transformation of 50% of raw materials into value-added goods (industry and SMEs).
- expansion of the country’s fibre optic network, introduction of an re-education programme, establishment of cybercentres in every municipality (post and ICTs).
- construction and equipping of 25 000 classrooms, construction of four universities and a university village, rehabilitation of several existing universities (education).
- rehabilitation of hospitals and clinics, free health care for children under the age of five, free childbirth care and free emergency care (health).
- construction of latrines in rural areas, rehabilitation of sewage systems in Abidjan and Yamoussoukro (sanitation).
- connection of 30 000 low-income families each year to subsidized piped water (drinking water).
- rehabilitation of the lagoon and Cocody Bay in Abidjan and construction of a technopole to treat and recycle industrial and dangerous waste (environment).

== Science policy ==
As of 2015, Ivory Coast did not have a dedicated policy for science, technology and innovation (STI). Related policies are implemented by the Ministry of Higher Education and Scientific Research. The main planning body is the Directorate General of Scientific Research and Technological Innovation and its technical directorate. For its part, the Higher Council for Scientific Research and Technological Development serves as a forum for consultation and dialogue with stakeholders and research partners.

Research and innovation are promoted and funded by the National Agricultural Investment Programme (est. 2010), the Policy Support Programme for Scientific Research (est. 2007), the Interprofessional Fund for Agricultural Research and Advice (est. 2002), the National Fund for Scientific and Technological Research (yet to be established) and the Ivorian Fund for the Development of National Enterprises (est. 1999).

According to the African Biosafety Network of Expertise, Ivory Coast did not have any biosafety laws or confined field trials in 2013.

== Structures fostering technology transfer ==
The following structures foster innovation and technology transfer: the Department for the Promotion of Research and Technological Innovation, the Ivorian Organization for Intellectual Property and the Centre for the Demonstration and Promotion of Technologies. To this list should be added the Ivorian Society of Tropical Technology. Set up in 1979, this government centre promotes agro-industrial innovation and provides training in the preservation and transformation of crops (manioc, banana plantain, cashew nut, coconut, pineapple, etc.) into value-added goods such as soap and cocoa butter. Other key structures include the Pasteur Institute, Centre for Oceanological Research, National Centre for Agronomic Research, National Institute of Public Health, Centre for Ecological Research and the Centre for Economic and Social Research.

The National School of Statistics and Economics was designated a centre of excellence in 2012 by the West African Economic and Monetary Union (WAEMU). This label entitled it to two years of financial support from WAEMU.

== Research and development ==
=== Financial investment ===
According to the Ministry of Higher Education and Scientific Research, Ivory Coast devoted about 0.13% of its GDP to GERD in 2013. Apart from low investment, other challenges include inadequate scientific equipment, the fragmentation of research organizations and a failure to exploit and protect research results.

The share of the National Development Plan to 2015 devoted to scientific research remains modest. Within the section on greater wealth creation and social equity (63.8% of the total budget for the Plan), just 1.2% is allocated to scientific research. Twenty-four national research programmes group public and private research and training institutions around a common research theme. These programmes correspond to eight priority sectors for 2012–2015, namely: health, raw materials, agriculture, culture, environment, governance, mining and energy; and technology.

=== Human investment ===
In 2012, Ivory Coast counted 57 541 students at post-secondary diploma level, 23 008 first- and second-degree (bachelor's and master's) students and 269 PhD students. Enrolment in tertiary education suffered during the political crisis, halving from 9.03% of the 18-25-year cohort in 2009 to 4.46% in 2012.

Recent data are unavailable but, in 2005, there were a total of 1,269 researchers in full-time equivalents, corresponding to 73 per million inhabitants. Some 16% of researchers were women, a lower proportion than the 30% average for Sub-Saharan Africa.

=== Scientific output ===
Scientific output is relatively modest in Ivory Coast, with scientists producing 10 articles per million inhabitants in international journals in 2014, compared to a continental average of 20 per million. The language barrier may explain this trend at least in part, since Thomson Reuters' database tends to favour English-language journals. Between 2005 and 2014, Ivory Coast's scientific output almost doubled from 110 to 208, according to Thomson Reuters' Web of Science (Science Citation Index Expanded), a trend also observed in other West African countries. The production of scientific articles from Ivory Coast peaked in 2012 before declining slightly in 2014, no doubt as a result of the political crisis in the country. Between 2008 and 2014, scientists published most in biological sciences (427 articles), followed by medical sciences (302) then geosciences (114), agriculture and chemistry (78 each).

Ivory Coast is an exception in West Africa for the rate of international collaboration. Whereas more than eight out of ten articles had a foreign co-author in most countries in 2014, the rate in Ivory Coast was 73%. Between 2008 and 2014, Ivory Coast's main scientific partners were France (610 co-authored articles), the United States of America (183), Switzerland (162), the United Kingdom (109) and Burkina Faso (93). Ivory Coast is also the fifth-closest collaborator for Togo. Ivory Coast was ranked 110th in the Global Innovation Index in 2025.

== Regional science and technology policy ==
Ivory Coast is a member of the Economic Community of West African States (ECOWAS). In 2011, ECOWAS adopted a Policy on Science and Technology (ECOPOST). ECOPOST is an integral part of the subregion's development blueprint to 2020, entitled Vision 2020. Vision 2020 proposes a road map for improving governance, accelerating economic and monetary integration and fostering public–private partnerships. It endorses the planned harmonization of investment laws in West Africa and suggests pursuing ‘with vigour’ the creation of a regional investment promotion agency. Countries are urged to promote efficient, viable small and medium-sized enterprises and to expose traditional agriculture to modern technology, entrepreneurship and innovation, in order to improve productivity.

ECOPOST provides a framework for member states wishing to improve – or elaborate for the first time – their own national policies and action plans for science, technology and innovation. Importantly, ECOPOST includes a mechanism for monitoring and evaluating the policy’s implementation, an aspect often overlooked.

ECOPOST advocates the development of a science culture in all sectors of society, including through science popularization, the dissemination of research results in local and international journals, the commercialization of research results, greater technology transfer, intellectual property protection, stronger university–industry ties and the enhancement of traditional knowledge.

== Regional research centres ==
Ivory Coast should be able to take advantage of a number of subregional centres established in recent years.

=== Centre for Renewable Energy and Energy Efficiency ===
The United Nations Industrial Development Organization (UNIDO) established the ECOWAS Centre for Renewable Energy and Energy Efficiency (ECREEE) in Praia, the capital of Cape Verde, in 2010. The centre has been established within the United Nations' Sustainable Energy for All programme. The mission of the centre is to create favourable framework conditions for renewable energy and energy efficiency markets in the 15 member states of ECOWAS. Since its founding, there has been growing external demand for its services.

Two other centres in Sub-Saharan Africa will seek to replicate the ECREEE model. One will be established by UNIDO and the East African Community to serve Burundi, Kenya, Rwanda, Tanzania and Uganda. A second will serve the 15 Member States of the Southern Africa Development Community. Both centres should be fully operational by 2014. Other centres are being established within the same network in the Caribbean and Pacific.

=== West African Biosciences Network ===
From 2005 onwards, the New Partnership for Africa's Development set up four networks within the African Biosciences Initiative. The West African Biosciences Network has its hub at the Senegalese Institute for Agricultural Research in Dakar. The other networks are the Southern African Network for Biosciences, based at the Council for Scientific and Industrial Research in Pretoria (South Africa), the Northern Africa Biosciences Network based at the National Research Centre in Cairo (Egypt) and the Biosciences Eastern and Central Africa Network based at the International Livestock Research Institute in Nairobi (Kenya).

=== African Institutes for Mathematical Sciences ===
There are five African Institutes for Mathematical Sciences. These are situated in Cameroon (est. 2013), Ghana (est. 2012), Senegal (est. 2013), South Africa (est. 2003) and Tanzania (est. 2014). The one in Senegal teaches in both English and French. Each institute provides academic programmes in basic and applied mathematics, including cosmology, finance and computing, as well as interdisciplinary fields like bioinformatics. Each also provides community services.

The first institute was the brainchild of South African cosmologist Neil Turok. It is planned to develop 15 centres of excellence across Africa by 2023 within the Next Einstein Initiative, a name inspired by the idea that the next Einstein could come from Africa. The project is supported by numerous governments in Africa and Europe, as well as by the Government of Canada.

=== West Africa Institute ===
The West Africa Institute was established in Praia (Cape Verde) in 2010 to provide the missing link between policy and research in the regional integration process. The institute is a service provider, conducting research for regional and national public institutions, the private sector, civil society and the media. The think tank also organizes political and scientific dialogues between policymakers, regional institutions and members of civil society.

== Global Health Security Agenda ==
The Ebola epidemic in 2014 highlighted the challenge of mobilizing funds, equipment and human resources to manage a rapidly evolving health crisis. In 2015, the United States of America decided to invest US$1 billion over the next five years in preventing, detecting and responding to future infectious disease outbreaks in 17 countries, within its Global Health Security Agenda. Ivory Coast is one of these 17 countries. The others are: (in Africa) Burkina Faso, Cameroon, Ethiopia, Guinea, Kenya, Liberia, Mali, Senegal, Sierra Leone, Tanzania and Uganda; (in Asia): Bangladesh, India, Indonesia, Pakistan and Viet Nam.

== See also ==
- List of universities in Ivory Coast
- Félix Houphouët-Boigny University (Université Félix Houphouët-Boigny)
- Abidjan University (Université d'Abidjan)
- University of Cocody-Abidjan (Université de Cocody-Abidjan)
- National Polytechnic Institute Félix Houphouët-Boigny (Institut National Polytechnique Félix Houphouët-Boigny)
- University of Bouaké (Université de Bouaké)
- Jean Lorougnon Guédé University (Université Jean Lorougnon Guédé)
- University of Korhogo (Université de Korhogo)
- Alassane Ouattara University (Université Alassane Ouattara)
- University of Man (Université de Man)
- Nangui Abrogoua University (Université Nangui Abrogoua)
- Peleforo Gon Coulibaly University (Université Peleforo Gon Coulibaly)
- Felix Houphouet-Boigny Polytechnic Institute (Institut Polytechnique Félix Houphouët-Boigny)
- Felix Houphouet-Boigny University of Science and Technology (Université des Sciences et Technologies Félix Houphouët-Boigny)
- Houphouët-Boigny Institute for Rural Development (Institut Houphouët-Boigny pour le Développement Durable)
- INP-HB Yamoussoukro (Institut National Polytechnique Félix Houphouët-Boigny Yamoussoukro) Please note that this is not an exhaustive list, and there may be other universities, colleges, and higher education institutions in Ivory Coast as well.
