= Science and technology in Burkina Faso =

Science and technology in Burkina Faso summarizes trends in scientific education, research in policy in Burkina Faso since 2010, within the West Africa regional context.

== Socio-economic context ==
Burkina Faso is striving to achieve middle-income status by 2030. According to the World Bank, Gross domestic product (GDP) per capita has risen steadily over the past decade to $1,720 (in purchasing power parity dollars) by 2016, thanks to consistently strong economic growth that peaked at over 8% in 2010. After slowing to 4.3% per year in 2014, the economy returned to an annual growth rate of 6% in 2016. After declining to 1.9% in 2020 Burkina Faso's annual growth rate recovered to 6.9% in 2021 and is now at $918.15 USD.

The economy remains dominated by the services sector, which contributed almost half (48%) of the GDP in 2013. The manufacturing sector plays a modest role in the economy, contributing 6% of GDP. The top three export products in 2012 were cotton (44.9% of exports), gold in unwrought forms (29.4%) and gold in semi-manufactured forms (5.4%), according to the African Development Bank. Burkina Faso is one of a handful of West African countries which have raised public expenditure on agriculture to at least 10% of GDP, the target of the Maputo Declaration (2003), which was reasserted in 2014.

Burkina Faso had a population of 21,935,389 in 2022. The country is experiencing demographic growth at 3% annually. Life expectancy at birth was 63.44 in 2022.

Just 4.4% of the population had access to the Internet in 2014 but two-thirds of the population (67%) had a mobile phone subscription.

Burkina Faso is ranked 186th on the Human Development Index (2023) and 123rd on the Global Innovation Index (2025). Burkina Faso is a member of both the Economic Community of West African States (ECOWAS) and the West African Economic and Monetary Union (WAEMU).

== Education ==
=== Enrolment trends ===
The considerable efforts made in West Africa to reach the Millennium Development Goal of primary education for all are paying off, with the average enrolment rate having risen from 88% to 93% in the subregion between 2004 and 2012. According to the ECOWAS Annual Report (2012), enrolment has increased by as much as 20% since 2004 in four countries: Benin, Burkina Faso, Côte d'Ivoire and Niger.

By 2012, Burkina Faso had an 85% gross enrolment rate for primary education. This drops to 26% at secondary level and to 4.5% at tertiary level. Since 2009, enrolment rates have increased from 78%, 20% and 3.5% respectively in Burkina Faso. However, more than half of children were still not completing the primary cycle in 2012.

Burkina Faso has one of Africa's highest levels of public expenditure on higher education, at 0.93% of GDP in 2013, according to the UNESCO Institute for Statistics. This represents 22% of the education budget and is up from 0.74% of GDP in 2006 (19% of the education budget).

University student rolls doubled in Burkina Faso between 2007 and 2012. Burkina Faso has one of the subregion’s highest ratios of PhD students: one in 20 graduates goes on to enroll in a PhD. The number of PhDs in engineering fields remained low (58) in 2012 but there had been none at all five years earlier. Burkina Faso trains a much greater number of PhDs in the field of health than its neighbors. In 2012, one in three PhD candidates in health sciences was a women, compared to about one in five in science and engineering.

Before he died in December 2013, Nelson Mandela, a champion of education, lent his name to two graduate universities entrusted with the mission of producing a new generation of Africa-focused researchers, the African Institutes of Science and Technology in Tanzania and Nigeria. A third is planned for Burkina Faso.

Table: University student enrolment in Burkina Faso by field, in 2007 and 2012

| | Total | | | Science | | | Engineering, manufacturing and construction | | | Agriculture | | | Health | | |
| | Post-secondary | First and second degree | PhD | Post-secondary | First and second degree | PhD | Post-secondary | First and second degree | PhD | Post-secondary | First and second degree | PhD | Post-secondary | First and second degree | PhD |
| Burkina Faso, 2007 | 7 964 | 24 259 | 1236 | 735 | 3 693 | 128 | 284 | - | 0 | 100 | 219 | 2 | 203 | 1 892 | 928 |
| Burkina Faso, 2012 | 16 801 | 49 688 | 2405 | 1 307 | 8 730 | 296 | 2 119 | 303 | 58 | 50 | 67 | 17 | 0 | 2 147 | 1 554 |

Source: UNESCO Science Report: towards 2030 (2015), Table 18.4

Table: West African PhD students by field of science and engineering, 2007 and 2012 or closest year

| | Science | | Engineering, manufacturing and construction | | Agriculture | | Health | |
| | Total | Women | Total | Women | Total | Women | Total | Women |
| Burkina Faso, 2007 | 128 | 9 | 0 | 0 | 2 | 1 | 928 | 265 |
| Burkina Faso, 2012 | 296 | 48 | 58 | 12 | 17 | 2 | 1 554 | 551 |
| Ghana, 2008 | 52 | 8 | 29 | 2 | 32 | 3 | 6 | 1 |
| Ghana, 2012 | 176 | 28 | 57 | 9 | 132 | 45 | 69 | 23 |
| Mali, 2008 | 26 | 2 | 19 | 3 | 3 | 0 | 0 | 0 |
| Mali, 2011 | 82 | 14 | 36 | 7 | 23 | 5 | 0 | 0 |
| Niger, 2011 | 21 | 3 | 1 | 0 | 6 | 2 | 213 | 26 |

Source: UNESCO Science Report: towards 2030 (2015), Table 18.5

=== Designated centres of excellence ===
In 2012, the West African Economic and Monetary Union (WAEMU) designated 14 centres of excellence in the region. This label entitles these institutions to financial support from WAEMU for a two-year period. Four of these are in Burkina Faso: International Institute of Water and Environmental Engineering, Higher Institute of Population Sciences, International Centre for Research and Development into Animal Husbandry in Subtropical Zones and the Centre for Research in Biological and Food Science and Nutrition.

In April 2014, the World Bank launched the African Centres of Excellence project. Eight governments are to receive a total of almost US$150 million in loans to fund research and training at 19 of the subregion’s best universities. One of the selected centres of excellence is the International Institute of Water and Environmental Engineering in Burkina Faso. The Association of African Universities has received World Bank funding for the purpose of co-ordinating the project and knowledge-sharing among all 19 participating universities. Burkina Faso will be receiving $8 million in loans, the same amount as Benin, Cameroon and Togo. Nigeria will be receiving US$70 million, Ghana US$24 million, Senegal US$16 million and Gambia US$2 million.

Within the framework of its Policy on Science and Technology (ECOPOST), ECOWAS intends to establish several centres of excellence of its own on a competitive basis.

== Trends in science policy ==
In January 2011, the government created the Ministry of Scientific Research and Innovation. Up until then, management of science, technology and innovation had fallen under the Department of Secondary and Higher Education and Scientific Research. Within this ministry, the Directorate General for Research and Sector Statistics is responsible for planning. A separate body, the Directorate General of Scientific Research, Technology and Innovation, co-ordinates research. This is a departure from the pattern in many other West African countries where a single body fulfils both functions. It is a sign of the government's intention to make science and technology a development priority.

In 2012, Burkina Faso adopted a National Policy for Scientific and Technical Research, the strategic objectives of which are to develop R&D and the application and commercialization of research results. The policy also makes provisions for strengthening the ministry’s strategic and operational capacities. One of the key priorities is to improve food security and self-sufficiency by boosting capacity in agricultural and environmental sciences. The creation of a centre of excellence at the International Institute of Water and Environmental Engineering in Ouagadougou within the World Bank project cited above provides essential funding for capacity-building in these priority areas.

A dual priority is to promote innovative, effective and accessible health systems. The growing number of doctoral candidates in medicine and related fields is a step in the right direction. The government wishes to develop, in parallel, applied sciences and technology and social and human sciences. To complement the national research policy, the government has prepared a National Strategy to Popularize Technologies, Inventions and Innovations (2012) and a National Innovation Strategy (2014).

Other policies also incorporate science and technology, such as that on Secondary and Higher Education and Scientific Research (2010), the National Policy on Food and Nutrition Security (2014) and the National Programme for the Rural Sector (2011).

In 2013, Burkina Faso passed the Science, Technology and Innovation Act establishing three mechanisms for financing research and innovation, a clear indication of high-level commitment. These mechanisms are the National Fund for Education and Research, the National Fund for Research and Innovation for Development and the Forum of Scientific Research and Technological Innovation. Funding comes from the national budget and various annual subsidies: 0.2% of tax revenue, 1% of mining revenue and 1% of the revenue from operating mobile phone licenses. The funds also benefit from royalties on sales from the results of research and the patent license agreement concerning inventions funded by the public purse. The creation of national funds for research and development is one of the recommendations of ECOPOST.

The other most important actors in research are the National Centre for Scientific and Technological Research, Institute for the Environment and Agricultural Research, National Agency for Biodiversity, National Council for Phytogenetic Resources Management and the Technical Secretariat for Atomic Energy. Responsibility for technology transfer and the popularization of research results falls to the National Agency for the Promotion of Research Results and the National Centre for Scientific and Technological Research.

== Research trends ==
=== Financial investment in research ===
ECOWAS countries still have a long way to go to reach the African Union’s target of devoting 1% of GDP to gross domestic expenditure on research and development (GERD). Mali comes closest (0.66% of GDP in 2010), followed by Senegal (0.54% of GDP in 2010) and Ghana (0.30% of GDP in 2010). Burkina Faso devoted 0.20% of GDP to research in 2009. The strong economic growth experienced by the subregion in recent years makes it harder to improve the GERD/GDP ratio, since GDP keeps rising.

Although the government is the main source of research expenditure in West Africa, foreign sources contribute a sizeable chunk in Ghana (31%), Senegal (41%) and Burkina Faso (60%).

=== Human investment in research ===
In 2010, Burkina Faso counted 48 researchers (in full-time equivalents) per million inhabitants. This compares with 39 per million in Ghana (2010) and Nigeria (2007) and 361 per million in Senegal (2010). In Burkina Faso, almost half of researchers (46%) are employed in the health sector.

Table: Researchers (full-time equivalents) in Burkina Faso, 2010

| Total researchers | | | By field of science and share of women | | | | | | | | | | | |
| Numbers | Per million population | Women (%) | Natural Sciences | Women (%) | Engineering | Women (%) | Medical and Health Sciences | Women (%) | Agricultural Sciences | Women (%) | Social Sciences | Women (%) | Humanities | Women (%) |
| 742 | 48 | 21.6 | 98 | 12.2 | 121 | 12.8 | 344 | 27.4 | 64 | 13.7 | 26 | 15.5 | 49 | 30.4 |

Source: UNESCO Science Report: towards 2030 (2015), Table 18.5

=== Research output ===
When it comes to scientific publications, West Africa has not progressed as quickly as the rest of the continent since 2005. Output remains low, with only Gambia and Cabo Verde publishing more than 50 articles per million inhabitants in 2014, while Burkina Faso was at 16 per million inhabitants. The average for sub-Saharan Africa was 20 and the global average was 176 per million inhabitants.

Burkina Faso was ranked 124th in the Global Innovation Index in 2023.

Burkina Faso is among the top closest collaborators for the following West African countries: Côte d'Ivoire, Mali, Senegal and Togo. Between 2008 and 2014, the top collaborators for scientists from Burkina Faso came from France, the United States, the United Kingdom, Belgium and Germany.

== Regional science and technology policy ==
Burkina Faso is a member of the Economic Community of West African States (ECOWAS). In 2011, ECOWAS adopted a Policy on Science and Technology (ECOPOST). ECOPOST is an integral part of the subregion's development blueprint to 2020, entitled Vision 2020. Vision 2020 proposes a road map for improving governance, accelerating economic and monetary integration and fostering public–private partnerships. It endorses the planned harmonization of investment laws in West Africa and suggests pursuing ‘with vigour’ the creation of a regional investment promotion agency. Countries are urged to promote efficient, viable small and medium-sized enterprises and to expose traditional agriculture to modern technology, entrepreneurship and innovation, in order to improve productivity.

ECOPOST provides a framework for member states wishing to improve – or elaborate for the first time – their own national policies and action plans for science, technology and innovation. Importantly, ECOPOST includes a mechanism for monitoring and evaluating the policy’s implementation, an aspect often overlooked.

ECOPOST advocates the development of a science culture in all sectors of society, including through science popularization, the dissemination of research results in local and international journals, the commercialization of research results, greater technology transfer, intellectual property protection, stronger university–industry ties and the enhancement of traditional knowledge.

== Regional research centres ==
Burkina Faso hosts the African Biosafety Network of Expertise. It is also a member of several regional research centres which have been set up since 2010.

=== Centre for Renewable Energy and Energy Efficiency ===
The United Nations Industrial Development Organization (UNIDO) established the ECOWAS Centre for Renewable Energy and Energy Efficiency (ECREEE) in Praia, the capital of Cabo Verde, in 2010. The centre has been established within the United Nations' Sustainable Energy for All programme. The mission of the centre is to create favourable framework conditions for renewable energy and energy efficiency markets in the 15 member states of ECOWAS. Since its founding, there has been growing external demand for its services.

Two other centres in sub-Saharan Africa will seek to replicate the ECREEE model. One will be established by UNIDO and the East African Community to serve Burundi, Kenya, Rwanda, Tanzania and Uganda. A second will serve the 15 Member States of the Southern Africa Development Community. Both centres should be fully operational by 2014. Other centres are being established within the same network in the Caribbean and Pacific.

=== West African Biosciences Network ===
From 2005 onwards, the New Partnership for Africa's Development set up four networks within the African Biosciences Initiative. The West African Biosciences Network has its hub at the Senegalese Institute for Agricultural Research in Dakar. The other networks are the Southern African Network for Biosciences, based at the Council for Scientific and Industrial Research in Pretoria (South Africa), the Northern Africa Biosciences Network based at the National Research Centre in Cairo (Egypt) and the Biosciences Eastern and Central Africa Network based at the International Livestock Research Institute in Nairobi (Kenya).

=== African Institutes for Mathematical Sciences ===
There are five African Institutes for Mathematical Sciences. These are situated in Cameroon (est. 2013), Ghana (est. 2012), Senegal (est. 2013), South Africa (est. 2003) and Tanzania (est. 2014). The one in Senegal teaches in both English and French. Each institute provides academic programmes in basic and applied mathematics, including cosmology, finance and computing, as well as interdisciplinary fields like bioinformatics. Each also provides community services.

The first institute was the brainchild of South African cosmologist Neil Turok. It is planned to develop 15 centres of excellence across Africa by 2023 within the Next Einstein Initiative, a name inspired by the idea that the next Einstein could come from Africa. The project is supported by numerous governments in Africa and Europe, as well as the Government of Canada.

=== West Africa Institute ===
The West Africa Institute was established in Praia (Cabo Verde) in 2010 to provide the missing link between policy and research in the regional integration process. The institute is a service provider, conducting research for regional and national public institutions, the private sector, civil society and the media. The think tank also organizes political and scientific dialogues between policy-makers, regional institutions and members of civil society.

== Global Health Security Agenda ==
The Ebola epidemic in 2014 highlighted the challenge of mobilizing funds, equipment and human resources to manage a rapidly evolving health crisis. In 2015, the United States of America decided to invest US$1 billion over the next five years in preventing, detecting and responding to future infectious disease outbreaks in 17 countries, within its Global Health Security Agenda. Burkina Faso is one of these 17 countries. The others are: (in Africa) Cameroon, Côte d'Ivoire, Ethiopia, Guinea, Kenya, Liberia, Mali, Senegal, Sierra Leone, Tanzania and Uganda; (in Asia): Bangladesh, India, Indonesia, Pakistan and Viet Nam.

== Sources ==
This article incorporates text from a free content work. Licensed under CC-BY-SA IGO 3.0. Text taken from UNESCO Science Report: towards 2030, 471-497, UNESCO, UNESCO Publishing.
