= Science and technology in Iceland =

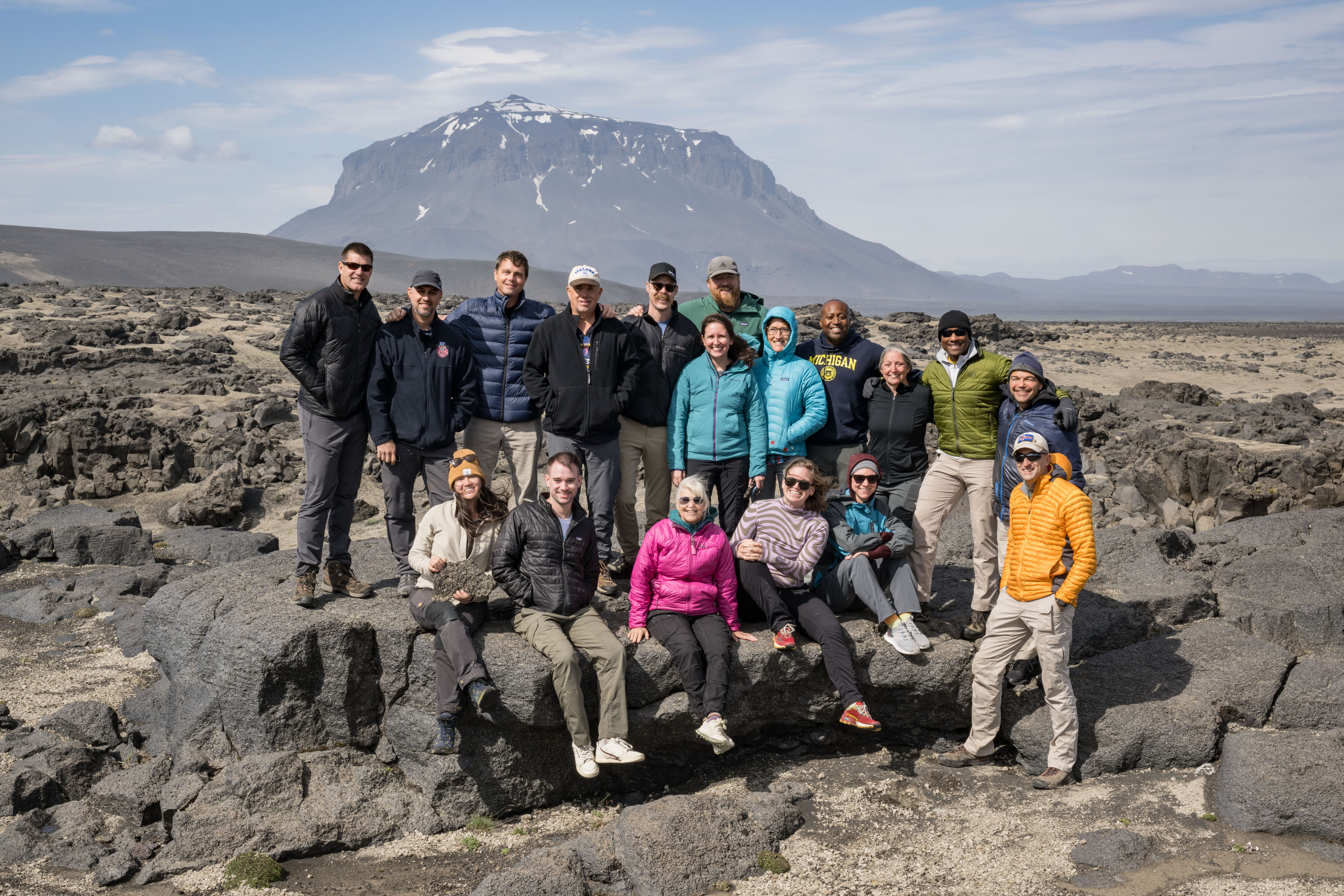
The Artemis II crew astronauts, their backups, and the geology training field team in Iceland

Science and technology in Iceland is well developed with the presence of several universities and research institutes.

According to the Global Innovation Index, Iceland was the 24th most innovative country in the world in 2025

== Government policy ==
Science and technology in Iceland are regulated by the Science and Technology Policy Council, which is chaired by the Prime Minister. In 2021, the government spent 28 billion ISK on research, a 130% increase over spending in 2017.

== See also ==
- Economy of Iceland
- Education in Iceland
