= Science and technology in Uzbekistan =

Science and technology in Uzbekistan examines government efforts to develop a national innovation system and the impact of these policies.

== Economic context ==
=== Economic performance ===
Since gaining independence in 1991, Uzbekistan and the other four Central Asian republics have gradually been moving from a state-controlled economy to a market economy. All five countries have pursued public policies which focus on buffering the political and economic spheres from external shocks. This includes maintaining a trade balance, minimizing public debt, and accumulating national reserves. The republics cannot totally insulate themselves from negative exterior forces, however. Particularly significant is the persistently weak recovery of global industrial production and international trade since 2008.

Although both exports and imports have grown impressively over the past decade, the republics remain vulnerable to economic shocks, owing to their reliance on exports of raw materials, a restricted circle of trading partners, and a negligible manufacturing capacity.

Uzbekistan emerged relatively unscathed from the 2008 financial crisis, consistently recording economic growth of over 7% from 2007 onwards. The country is more or less self-sufficient in oil and natural gas and is a major exporter of cotton. Against a background of strong economic growth, the national development strategy is focusing on nurturing new high-tech industries and orienting the economy towards export markets.

Whereas Kyrgyzstan, Tajikistan, and Kazakhstan have been members of the World Trade Organization since 1998, 2013, and 2015 respectively, Uzbekistan and Turkmenistan have adopted a policy of self-reliance. Symptomatic of this policy is the lesser role played by foreign direct investment in Uzbekistan. It contributed just 1.6% of GDP in 2015, after peaking at 4.2% of GDP in 2010. In Uzbekistan, the state controls virtually all strategic sectors of the economy, including agriculture, manufacturing, and finance, with foreign investors being relegated to less vital sectors, tourism for example.

Funding for strategic economic sectors

Uzbekistan's anti-crisis package for 2009−2012 helped it to rebound from the 2008 financial crisis by injecting funds into strategic economic sectors. For the period up to 2015, these sectors were the energy, oil and gas industries; the chemical, textile and automobile industries; non-ferrous metals; engineering; pharmaceuticals; high-quality processing of agricultural products; and construction materials.

Each of these sectors tends to involve large companies equipped with design bureaux and laboratories. There are also specialized state institutions which actively promote innovation. These include the Agency for Technology Transfer (since 2008), which transfers technology to the regions, the Scientific and Technical Information State Unitary Enterprise (since 2009), and the Intellectual Property Agency of Uzbekistan (since 2011).

=== Modernization of the economy ===
GDP in Central Asia by economic sector, 2005 and 2013. Source: UNESCO Science Report: towards 2030, figure 14.2.

Like its Central Asian neighbours, Uzbekistan has been modernizing the industrial sector and fostering the development of service industries through business-friendly fiscal policies and other measures, to reduce the share of agriculture in GDP. Between 2005 and 2013, the share of agriculture dropped from 28% to 19% of GDP in Uzbekistan.

One of these measures has been the creation, by decree, of free industrial zones (FIZ) to foster the modernization of all economic sectors. The Navoi region became the first FIZ in December 2008. It was followed by Angren in the Tashkent region in April 2012 and Djizak in the Sirdary region in March 2013. The enterprises established in these FIZ have already produced some inventions and are involved in public−private partnerships through which they co-finance projects in innovation with the Fund for the Reconstruction and Development of Uzbekistan, set up in May 2006.

== Science and technology ==
=== Research priorities ===
In 2012, the Committee for the Co-ordination of Science and Technology Development formulated eight priorities for research and development (R&D) to 2020, based on the needs of industry.

The first of these priorities is to construct an innovative economy by strengthening the rule of law. Innovation is perceived as a means of democratizing society in Uzbekistan. The ultimate goal of the ongoing legal reform is to harness innovation to solving socio-economic problems and enhancing economic competitiveness. The contours of a draft law on innovation and innovative activity were first outlined in the presidential decree of January 2011 devoted to deepening democratic reforms, including by strengthening the status of local representatives. This draft bill also sets out to create an effective mechanism for the testing, deployment and commercial development of promising scientific work. It outlines additional incentives and rewards for enterprises that develop innovative projects, especially in high-tech industries. In 2014, the draft law was subjected to public scrutiny to encourage debate.

The second and third research priorities to 2020 concern energy and resource savings, as well as the development of renewable energy use. In March 2013, two research institutes were created by presidential decree to foster the development of alternative energy sources, with funding from the Asian Development Bank and other institutions: the SPU Physical−Technical Institute (Physics Sun Institute) and the International Solar Energy Institute.

Meanwhile, the Institute for Comprehensive Research on Regional Problems of Samarkand has been transformed into a problem-solving laboratory on environmental issues within Samarkand State University. This is part of a reform instituted by decree in February 2012 by the Cabinet of Ministers. In all, more than 10 institutions of the Academy of Sciences are being re-organized, in order to re-orient academic research towards problem-solving and ensure continuity between basic and applied research. Another institute affected by the reform is the Mathematics and Information Technology Research Institute, which has been subsumed under the National University of Uzbekistan.

Information and communication technologies are one of the eight research priorities to 2020. According to the Thomson Reuters’ database, Uzbek research in computer sciences generated just four papers in international journals between 2008 and 2014.

The fifth research priority to 2020 encompasses agriculture, biotechnology, ecology and environmental protection and the sixth medicine and pharmacology. The seventh centres on chemical technologies and nanotechnologies and the eighth on Earth sciences, with a focus on geology, geophysics, seismology and raw mineral processing.

=== National Development Strategy 2017–2021 ===
The National Development Strategy 2017–2021 articulates the science development agenda. It identifies as priority areas for reform the commercialization of research results and the creation of new research laboratories and advanced technology centres. Research institutes and universities are to be encouraged to engage in public–private partnerships to establish technoparks.

The Ministry of Innovative Development (MoID) was created in November 2017 to lead the implementation of STI policies. This move reflects the new government policy placing innovation at the heart of the development process.

Other key ministries are supporting this transformation, notably the Ministry of the Economy and Industry and the Ministry for Development of Information Technologies and Communications.

Several presidential decrees specify concrete measures to overhaul the science and research system, including funding for research institutes. For example, the presidential decree of November 2017 (#3365) has approved the Programme for Strengthening the Infrastructure of R&D Organizations and Stimulating Innovation by 2021.

This programme earmarks US$32.3 million for renovating research institutes, purchasing scientific and laboratory equipment and supplying consumables. It includes a set of supporting activities in five broad areas: improving the efficiency of research institutes and deepening their integration with university research; attracting young scientists; developing stronger science–industry collaboration; improving intellectual property protection and technology transfer services; and ensuring access to international research databases and information.

=== A specialist university ===
Central Asian researchers by sector of employment (HC), 2013. Source: UNESCO Science Report: towards 2030 (2015), figure 14.5.

A university specializing in ICTs opened its doors to students in October 2014. Inha University in Tashkent is the result of collaboration with Inha University in the Republic of Korea, on which its academic programmes will be modelled. Initially, 70 students were selected for the Department of Information and Communication Engineering and a further 80 for the Department of Computer Science and Engineering. All lectures are being given in English.

=== Science-industry ties ===
The Uzbek national innovation system is still in its formative years. There is at best a tenuous relationship between science and industry and almost no commercialization of research results. State support (financial, material and technical) for innovation is provided directly to specific programmes and projects, rather than to the individual research institutions and hierarchical structures. One of the most effective elements of this approach is the principle of equity financing, which allows for a flexible combination of budgetary funds with funding from industry and the regions. This is designed to ensure that there is a demand for the research being undertaken and that the results will lead to products and processes. It also creates bridges between the public research sector and industrial enterprises.

==== Annual innovation fair ====
Researchers and industrialists can also discuss ideas at Uzbekistan's annual innovation fairs. Between 2008 and 2014, more than 2 300 contracts for experimental development were signed at these fairs for an investment of more than 85 billion Uzbek soms (UZS), equivalent to US$37 million. The products resulting from these contracts have ‘generated USS 680 billion (almost US$ 300 million), providing US$7.8 million in import substitution’, according to the report. One-quarter (26%) of the proposals vetted concerned biotechnologies, 19% new materials, 16% medicine, 15% oil and gas, 13% energy and metallurgy and 12% chemical technologies.

=== Research funding, 2015–2019 ===
Chronic underfunding for R&D is one of the country's biggest challenges. Currently, financial support is geared towards the creation of start-ups, technology transfer and training. There are also indirect policy instruments, such as fiscal incentives for companies in technology parks.

MoID has now begun reforming the science funding system. Prior to the ministry's inception in 2017, the government would fund research projects initiated by the scientific community once per year through a cumbersome procedure. Now, calls for proposals are announced online every two months and research grants are awarded on a competitive basis, taking into account the needs of the national economy.

Project funding used to cover researchers’ salaries, primarily. MoID has tripled the size of the average grant to about US$80 000 and at least 50% of allocated funds are now used by beneficiaries to purchase research equipment. The ministry has also increased funding for field expeditions and laboratories for regional universities, in an attempt to diversify research topics and expand the geographical coverage of scientific facilities.

This implies that more funding is going to institutions that do not fall under the National Academy of Sciences. MoID manages an Innovation Development Fund that is financed through an allocation from the innovation budget of state-owned enterprises. Established by presidential decree in 2018, this fund supports the creation of new research institutes and universities, the registration of patents, short-term scientific trips and schemes to attract foreign scientists.

The ministry has also launched short-term (three-month) foreign internships for researchers. A total of 300 researchers went abroad in 2018–2019 and a further 250 in 2020.

The ministry is also supporting bilateral research projects with research institutions in Belarus, China, Germany, India, the Russian Federation and Turkey. Although these higher levels of public financial support are welcome, more could be done to improve the mechanisms for fund distribution, commercialization and industry–science collaboration. There are examples of successful commercialization in the past, such as the locally produced medicines developed by research institutes, but companies struggle to introduce new or improved products that require an overhaul of production lines because this disrupts the ongoing production process and often requires heavy investment in new equipment.

Currently, research institutes receive three types of funding: core funds to maintain and upgrade facilities and equipment; funding for targeted research in priority areas; and competitive grant funding, which may target basic or applied research or innovation. Innovation grants, which specifically target commercialization, represent only about 2% of total grant funding. It is, thus, hardly surprising that research institutes would like to see innovation grants make up a much greater share of total grant funding to bridge the existing technological gap and cover additional costs related to marketing, intellectual property protection and so on.

The Academy of Sciences is leading the process to develop open laboratories. This is a positive development, since shared use of laboratory infrastructure helps research institutes to spread costs and ensure compliance with international standards, a prerequisite for expanding export markets and increasing protection from low-quality products produced abroad, such as poor-quality drugs.

=== Regulation of artificial intelligence and data protection ===
On 15 April 2025, Uzbekistan’s Legislative Chamber of the Oliy Majlis reviewed and approved in its first reading a bill aimed at regulating artificial intelligence (AI) and enhancing the protection of personal data. The proposed legislation introduces legal accountability for the misuse of personal information when AI technologies are involved, particularly through digital platforms and media.

The bill defines artificial intelligence in legal terms and outlines national policy directions for its development and use. Key provisions include mandatory labeling of AI-generated content and restrictions on applications that may violate personal freedoms, human dignity, or public health. The legislation also establishes penalties for unauthorized data processing and dissemination using AI.

This regulatory move comes amid rising global investment in AI, valued at $154 billion in 2023 with projections to increase tenfold by 2030, and growing concern in Uzbekistan over privacy risks, especially the spread of deepfakes. In 2024, incidents involving fake AI-generated content surged from 1,129 reported cases in 2023 to 3,553. If enacted, the bill would represent a significant effort by the Uzbek government to balance technological innovation with ethical and legal safeguards.

== Research trends ==
Trends in research expenditure in Central Asia, as a percentage of GDP, 2001−2013. Source: UNESCO Science Report: 2030 (2015), figure 14.3.

=== Financial investment in research ===
In the region, research spending has hovered around the 0.2–0.3% mark for the past decade but, in 2013, Uzbekistan boosted its own commitment to 0.41% of GDP, distancing Kazakhstan on 0.18%. Not to be outdone, Kazakhstan has vowed to raise its own research effort to 1% by 2015, according to the State Programme for Accelerated Industrial and Innovative Development. The world average for research effort was 1.7% of GDP in 2013.

In 2018, Uzbekistan devoted 0.13% of GDP tor research and development.

=== Investment in human capital ===
==== Education and training ====
Uzbekistan is generalizing the teaching of foreign languages at school, in order to facilitate international ties. In December 2012, a presidential decree focused on improving proficiency in foreign languages, beginning with the 2013/2014 academic year. English teaching, in particular, will be introduced into secondary schools and certain university courses will be taught in English, especially engineering and specialized areas, such as law and finance, in order to foster international information exchange and scientific co-operation. In parallel, universities are to be given greater access to international multimedia resources, specialized literature, newspapers and magazines.

In order to improve training, the Academy of Sciences created the first cross-sectorial youth laboratories in 2010, in promising fields such as genetics and biotechnology; advanced materials; alternative energy and sustainable energy; modern information technology; drug design; and technology, equipment and product design for the oil and gas and chemical industries. These fields were chosen by the academy to reflect the strengths of Uzbek science. The Academy of Sciences has also revived the Council of Young Scientists.

In July 2012, a presidential decree abolished the system of Candidate of Science and Doctor of Science degrees inherited from the Soviet system, replacing it with the three-tier degree system consisting of bachelor's, master's and PhD degrees. Whereas those with a bachelor's degree used to be barred from postgraduate studies under the old system, they will now be able to apply for a course leading to a master's degree. This should incite young people to study science. In 2014, about 30% of the younger generation held no degree qualification at all.

Table: PhDs obtained in science and engineering in Central Asia, 2013 or closest year

	PhDs		PhDs in science				PhDs in engineering			
	Total	Women (%)	Total	Women (%)	Total per million population	Women PhDs per million population	Total	Women (%)	Total per million population	Women PhDs per million population
Kazakhstan (2013)	247	51	73	60	4.4	2.7	37	38	2.3	0.9
Kyrgyzstan (2012)	499	63	91	63	16.6	10.4	54	63	–	–
Tajikistan (2012)	331	11	31	–	3.9	–	14	–	–	
Uzbekistan (2011)	838	42	152	30	5.4	1.6	118	27.0	–	–

Source: UNESCO Science Report: towards 2030 (2015), Table 14.1

Note: PhD graduates in science cover life sciences, physical sciences, mathematics and statistics, and computing; PhDs in engineering also cover manufacturing and construction. For Central Asia, the generic term of PhD also encompasses Candidate of Science and Doctor of Science degrees. Data are unavailable for Turkmenistan.

Central Asian researchers by field of science, 2013. Source: UNESCO Science Report: towards 2030 (2015), figure 14.4.

==== Researchers ====
In 2014, Uzbekistan had a population of 33.3 million, compared to 16.6 million for Kazakhstan. The two most populous countries of Central Asia logically count the most researchers: just over 30 000 for Uzbekistan and 17 000 for Kazakhstan (in head counts), compared to a little over 2 000 for each of Kyrgyzstan and Tajikistan. This corresponds to a researcher density of 1,097 (per million population in head counts) for Uzbekistan and 1,046 for Kazakhstan (in head counts), compared to a global average of 1,083 (in full-time equivalents).

By 2018, researcher density had dropped to 980 (head counts).

Women make up 41% of Uzbek researchers, one of the highest ratios in the world. This is a legacy of the former Soviet Union, which laid great store by education. Four in ten PhDs (42%) are held by women, a figure close to the global average (43%). Women are almost as present in engineering as in science, accounting for 30% of PhDs in scientific disciplines and 27% of those in engineering. In the business sector, four out of ten researchers are women.

Share of Uzbek women among researchers in the business enterprise sector, 2013 or closest year. Source: UNESCO Science Report: towards 2030, figure 3.4.

In 2011, three-quarters of Uzbek researchers were employed in higher education and just 6% in the business enterprise sector. With most university researchers nearing retirement, this imbalance imperils Uzbekistan's research future. Almost all holders of a Candidate of Science, Doctor of Science or PhD are more than 40 years old and half are over the age of 60. Nearly one in four researchers (38.4%) holds a PhD, or its equivalent, and the remainder a bachelor's or master's degree.

Table: Central Asian researchers by field of science and gender, 2013 or closest year

		Total researchers (head counts)			Researchers by field of science (head counts)											
		Total researchers (head counts)			Natural Sciences		Engineering and technology		Medical and health sciences		Agricultural sciences		Social sciences		Humanities	
	Total researchers	Per million pop.	Number of women	Women (%)	Total	Women (%)	Total	Women (%)	Total	Women (%)	Total	Women (%)	Total	Women (%)	Total	Women (%)
Kazakhstan 2013	17 195	1 046	8 849	51.5	5 091	51.9	4 996	44.7	1 068	69.5	2 150	43.4	1 776	61.0	2 114	57.5
Kyrgyzstan 2011	2 224	412	961	43.2	593	46.5	567	30.0	393	44.0	212	50.0	154	42.9	259	52.1
Tajikistan 2013	2 152	262	728	33.8	509	30.3	206	18.0	374	67.6	472	23.5	335	25.7	256	34.0
Uzbekistan 2011	30 890	1 097	12 639	40.9	6 910	35.3	4 982	30.1	3 659	53.6	1 872	24.8	6 817	41.2	6 650	52.0

Source: UNESCO Science Report: towards 2030 (2015), Table 14.1

Scientific publications from Central Asia catalogued by Thomson Reuters' Web of Science, Science Citation Index Expanded, 2005–2014, UNESCO Science Report: towards 2030 (2015), figure 14.6.

=== Research output ===
Since 2012, Uzbekistan has ceded its lead to Kazakhstan for the number of published scientific articles, according to Thomson Reuters’ Web of Science, Science Citation Index Expanded. Even taking population into account, Kazakhstan's output is now much higher than that of its neighbour, with 36 articles per million inhabitants, compared to 11 for Uzbekistan. The majority of scientific papers focus on physics (35%) and chemistry (21%), a pattern also found in Kazakhstan.

Since 2006, the rate of international collaboration has remained steady, at 60–64% of articles. Uzbek scientists collaborate mostly with their Russian counterparts but they also count German, American, Italian and Spanish scientists among their closest partners.

In December 2013, Prof. Ibrokhim Abdurakhmonov from the Uzbek Centre of Genomics and Bioinformatics was named ‘researcher of the year’ by the International Cotton Advisory Committee for a ‘gene knockout technology’’ he had developed with biologists from the Texas A&M University (USA) and the US Department of Agriculture’s Office of International Research Programs who had also provided much of the funding. The research done by Prof. Abdurakhmonov and his American partners could potentially have a multibillion-dollar impact on the global cotton industry and help cotton farmers fend off growing competition from synthetic fibres.

Cumulative total of articles by Central Asians between 2008 and 2013, by field of science. Source: UNESCO Science Report: towards 2030 (2015), figure 14.6.

Uzbekistan was ranked 79th in the Global Innovation Index in 2025.

== International cooperation in science ==
Uzbekistan and the other four Central Asian republics belong to several international bodies, including the Organization for Security and Co-operation in Europe, the Economic Cooperation Organization and the Shanghai Cooperation Organisation. They are also members of the Central Asia Regional Economic Cooperation (CAREC) Programme, which also includes Afghanistan, Azerbaijan, China, Mongolia and Pakistan. In November 2011, the 10 member countries adopted the CAREC 2020 Strategy, a blueprint for furthering regional co-operation. Over the decade to 2020, US$50 billion is being invested in priority projects in transport, trade and energy to improve members’ competitiveness. The landlocked Central Asian republics are conscious of the need to co-operate in order to maintain and develop their transport networks and energy, communication and irrigation systems. Only Kazakhstan and Turkmenistan border the Caspian Sea and none of the republics has direct access to an ocean, complicating the transportation of hydrocarbons, in particular, to world markets.

Uzbekistan is one of the four Central Asian republics that have been involved in a project launched by the European Union in September 2013, IncoNet CA. The aim of this project is to encourage Central Asian countries to participate in research projects within Horizon 2020, the European Union's eighth research and innovation funding programme. The focus of this research projects is on three societal challenges considered as being of mutual interest to both the European Union and Central Asia, namely: climate change, energy and health. IncoNet CA builds on the experience of earlier projects which involved other regions, such as Eastern Europe, the South Caucasus and the Western Balkans. IncoNet CA focuses on twinning research facilities in Central Asia and Europe. It involves a consortium of partner institutions from Austria, the Czech Republic, Estonia, Germany, Hungary, Kazakhstan, Kyrgyzstan, Poland, Portugal, Tajikistan, Turkey and Uzbekistan. In May 2014, the European Union launched a 24-month call for project applications from twinned institutions – universities, companies and research institutes – for funding of up to €10, 000 to enable them to visit one another's facilities to discuss project ideas or prepare joint events like workshops.

== Sources ==
This article incorporates text from a free content work. Licensed under CC-BY-SA IGO 3.0. Text taken from UNESCO Science Report: towards 2030, 365-387, UNESCO, UNESCO Publishing.

This article incorporates text from a free content work. Licensed under CC BY-SA 3.0 IGO Text taken from UNESCO Science Report: the Race Against Time for Smarter Development, UNESCO, UNESCO publishing. To learn how to add open license text to Wikipedia articles, please see this how-to page. For information on reusing text from Wikipedia, please see the terms of use.
