= African Biosafety Network of Expertise =

The African Biosafety Network of Expertise describes a continental network hosted by Ouagadougou, Burkina Faso.

== Origin ==
The African Biosafety Network of Expertise was launched on 23 February 2010 with the signing of a host agreement between the New Partnership for Africa's Development (NEPAD) and the Government of Burkina Faso.

It was conceptualized in Africa's Science and Technology Consolidated Plan of Action (2005) and fulfils the recommendation of the High-Level African Panel on Modern Biotechnology, entitled Freedom to Innovate. The network is funded by the Bill and Melinda Gates Foundation.

== Mission and activities ==
The network serves as a resource for regulators dealing with safety issues related to the introduction and development of genetically modified organisms. In addition to providing regulators with access to policy briefs and other relevant information online in English and French, the network organizes national and subregional workshops on specific topics. For instance, one-week biosafety courses for African regulators were run by the network in Burkina Faso in November 2013 and in Uganda in July 2014, in partnership with the University of Michigan (US). Twenty-two regulators from Ethiopia, Kenya, Malawi, Mozambique, Tanzania, Uganda, and Zimbabwe took part in the latter course.

In April 2014, the network ran a training workshop in Nigeria at the request of the Federal Ministry of Environment for 44 participants drawn from government ministries, regulatory agencies, universities, and research institutions. The aim was to strengthen the regulatory capacity of institutional biosafety committees. This training was considered important to ensure continued regulatory compliance for ongoing confined field trials and multilocation trials for Maruca-resistant cowpea and biofortified sorghum. The workshop was run in partnership with the International Food Policy Research Institute's Program for Biosafety Systems.

From 28 April to 2 May 2014, Togo's Ministry of Environment and Forest Resources organized a stakeholders' consultative workshop to validate Togo's revised biosafety law. Around 60 participants took part, including government officials, researchers, lawyers, biosafety regulators and civil society representatives; the workshop was chaired by a member of the National Biosafety Committee. The aim of the draft bill was to align Togo's biosafety law signed in January 2009 with international biosafety regulations and best practices, especially the Nagoya Kuala Lumpur Supplementary Protocol on Liability and Redress that Togo had signed in September 2011. The validation workshop was a critical step before the new bill could be tabled at the National Assembly for adoption later that year.

In June 2014, the network organized a four-day study tour to South Africa for ten regulators and policy-makers from Burkina Faso, Ethiopia, Kenya, Malawi, Mozambique, and Zimbabwe. The main objective was to allow them to interact directly with their peers and industrial practitioners in South Africa. The study tour was organized under the auspices of the NEPAD Planning and Coordinating Agency, in partnership with the Southern Africa Network for Biosciences (SANBio).

== Sources ==
This article incorporates text from a free content work. Licensed under CC-BY-SA IGO 3.0. Text taken from UNESCO Science Report: towards 2030, 475, UNESCO, UNESCO Publishing.
