= West Africa Institute =

- Headquarters: Persia; Cabo Verde
- Services: Research and policy dialogue
- Fields: Research; Policy analysis
- Affiliations: West African Economic and Monetary Union; UNESCO; Ecobank; Government of Cabo Verde

The West Africa Institute was established in Praia, Cabo Verde in 2010 to provide the missing link between policy and research in the regional integration process.

== Origin ==
The idea emerged from 15 research workshops organized in each of the 15 member states of the Economic Community of West African States (ECOWAS) on the theme of regional integration by UNESCO’s programme for the Management of Social Transformations.

In 2008, the Summit of Heads of State and Government of ECOWAS in Ouagadougou (Burkina Faso) unanimously endorsed the idea to create the West Africa Institute In 2009, UNESCO’s General Conference established the West Africa Institute as one of its category 2 institutes, which means that it functions under the auspices of UNESCO. A year later, the Government of Cabo Verde passed a law establishing the institute in the capital. The institute is the fruit of a public– private partnership involving ECOWAS, the West African Economic and Monetary Union, UNESCO, the pan-African Ecobank and the Government of Cabo Verde.

== Mission ==
The West Africa Institute is a service provider, conducting research for regional and national public institutions, the private sector, civil society and the media. The think tank also organizes political and scientific dialogues between policy-makers, regional institutions and members of civil society.

There are ten research themes:

- the historical and cultural bases of regional integration;
- citizenship;
- governance;
- regional security;
- economic challenges to market integration in West Africa;
- new information and communication technologies;
- education;
- the problem of shared resources (land, water, minerals, coastal and maritime security);
- funding of non-governmental organizations in West Africa; and
- migration.
