= Pineapple production in Ivory Coast =

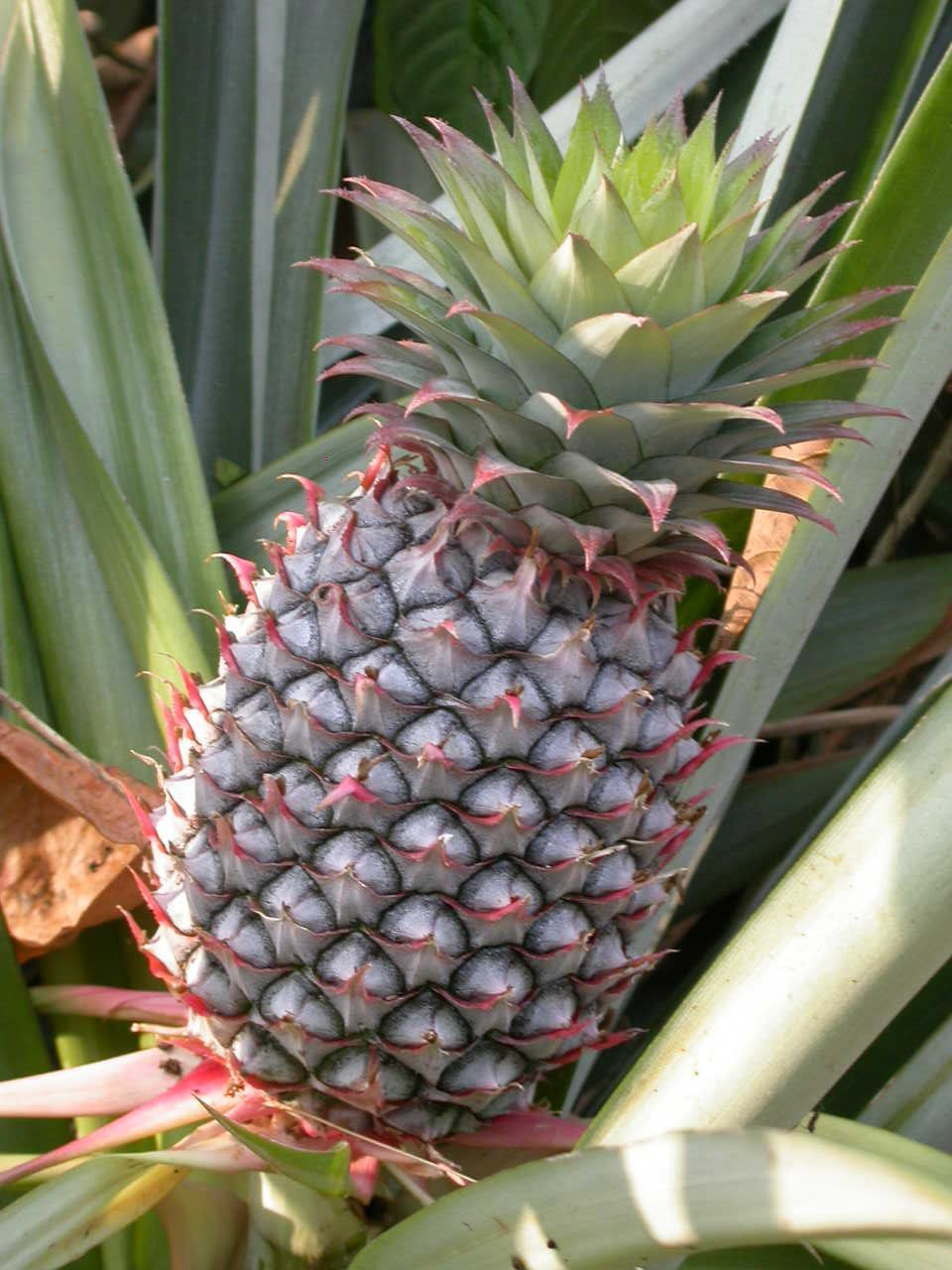
A pineapple, on its parent plant

Ivory Coast dominates the fresh pineapple trade. The export of pineapple products began during Ivory Coast's colonial period, when two processing plants were established with foreign help.

== History ==
When Ivory Coast gained independence, the export of pineapple products was less than half that of banana products. During the 1960s and 1970s, exports grew steadily, and by the early 1970s, the number of pineapple exports had surpassed the number of banana exports. In the 1980s, Thailand began competing with Ivory Coast, pushing world prices downward. Economic reforms in Ivory Coast reduced subsidies for several state enterprises and closed others, including Corfruitel, the parastatal in charge of marketing fruits, such as pineapples. At this time, most pineapple exports were canned pineapples or pineapple juice. For the reasons highlighted above, exports of these two products had practically disappeared by 1990.

At this time, much of the Ivorian pineapple industry switched over to fresh pineapple. In a very advantageous move, it exported these to Europe by sea-freight, using the same refrigerated freighters used for bananas. Ivory Coast once quasi-monopolised the world market on fresh pineapples, although it no longer enjoys that status once Costa Rica, Honduras, Ghana and other suppliers began developing their share of the industry.

== Farming and production ==
Ivory Coast is Europe's leading pineapple source, supplying over 200,000 tons of fresh fruit a year, or 60% of the European market. On the world scale, Ivory Coast is second only to Costa Rica. Combined, the two produce over 50% of the world's pineapples.

== Products ==
=== Cristelor ===
The Société fruitière du Bandama company created the popular drink Cristelor in 1983. Described as a delice d'ananas petillant, ("sparkling pineapple delight"), it is popularly called "pineapple champagne". The company's director, Jean Konan Banny, claimed the idea "came to [him when he thought] to make a wine from pineapples" and was named after his granddaughter, Cristel. He also proposed an alcoholic version of the drink.

== Research ==
In 1987, scientists at the Institute of Research on Energy Renewal (IREN) studied how to create ethanol from pineapples in Ivory Coast.
