= Richy Hughes =

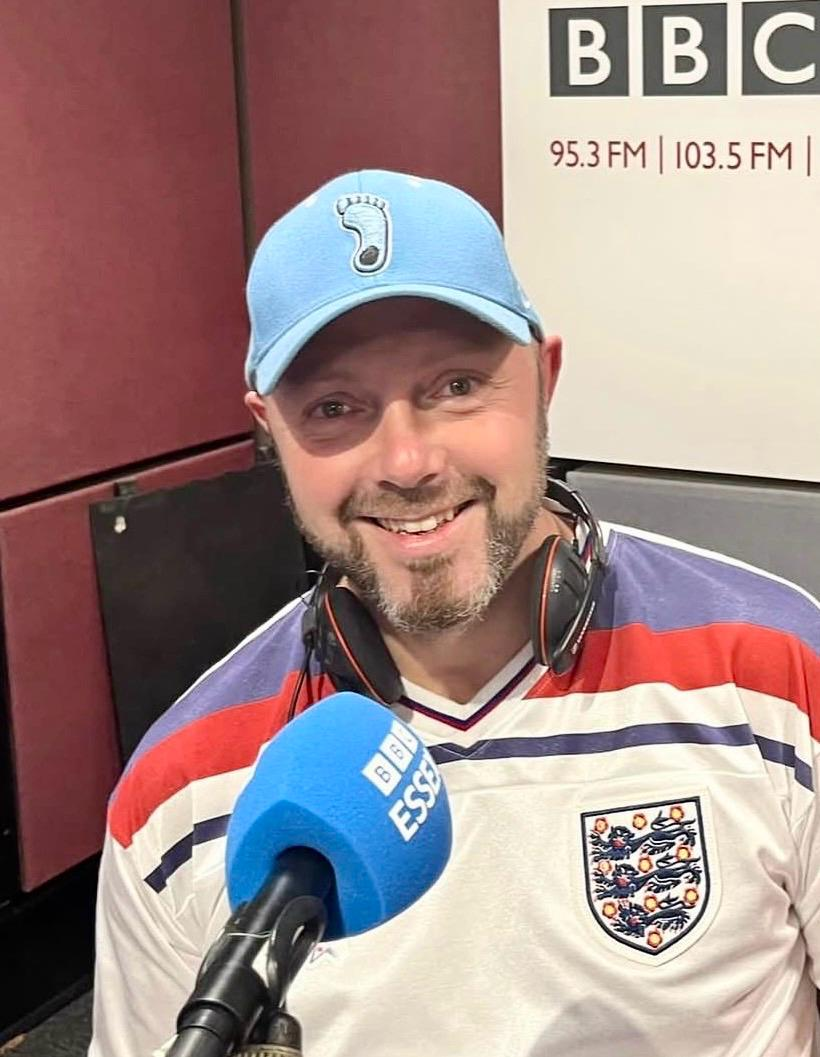
- Hughes in 2022

Background information
- Born: Richard Paul Hughes; July 5, 1974 (age 52); Orsett, England
- Origin: London, England
- Genres: Musical theatre
- Occupations: Lyricist, Bookwriter, Theatre Maker
- Years active: 2012-present
- Website: www.richyhughes.com

Richy Hughes is an English musical theatre lyricist and theatre maker from Thurrock, England.

== Early life ==
Born in 1974, Hughes attended Coopers' Company and Coborn School in Upminster, Essex. He regularly wrote and performed end of year revues, and won the school's Prize for Art in 1992. He went on to study Illustration at the Kent Institute of Art and Design.

From an early age Hughes was an active member of the amateur dramatics scene in his home town of Thurrock, starring in numerous roles including Sidney Carton in a musical premiere of A Tale of Two Cities, Riff in West Side Story, and Billy Bigelow in Carousel.

In 1999, he founded a youth theatre company known as Arts Factory.

== Career ==
=== Early career ===
Hughes' break into professional theatre came in 2012, when he entered a song into an open submission for A Song Cycle For Soho at the Soho Theatre. The comic song, titled "It's What He Would’ve Wanted", written with composer Scott Dean, tells the story of ‘Jimmy The Fox’ whose corpse is ‘borrowed’ from the undertakers on the eve of his funeral for one last bender in Soho.

In 2012, he joined the Book, Music, Lyrics professional writers’ workshop. Here he honed his lyric-writing craft under the tutelage of such esteemed theatre practitioners as Jeremy Sams, Charles Hart, Tim Sutton, David Firman, Mark Warman, George Stiles and Anthony Drewe.

=== 2015: Mr Popper's Penguins ===
Hughes' first professional commissions came after producer Kenny Wax attended a showcase of Book, Music, Lyrics alumni. Wax was impressed with Hughes' lyrics and invited him to collaborate on a new family musical adaptation of children's book Mr Popper's Penguins. The production premiered at The Lowry in Manchester in 2015 and has had runs at the Criterion Theatre in London's West End, the New Victory Theater in New York City, and the Seattle Children's Theatre, as well as extensive US and UK tours. The show was co-produced by Pins & Needles Productions, Kenny Wax Family Entertainment, and TC Beech, with songs written in collaboration with composer Luke Bateman.

=== 2017: Superhero ===
At the Book, Music, Lyrics workshop, Hughes met composer Joseph Finlay and bookwriter Michael Conley, his collaborators on Superhero, which premiered at Southwark Playhouse in June 2017. The song "Don't Look Down", taken from the show, won The Stiles and Drew Best New Song Prize in 2015 at an event at the Wyndham's Theatre, produced by Mercury Musical Developments and hosted by Elaine Paige. The show received the 2018 Offie for best new musical. Micheal Rouse received the 2018 Offie for Best Actor in a Musical for his portrayal of Colin Bradley.

=== 2019–2022: Oi Frog and Friends and "Stick Another Star on the Shirt" ===
In 2019, Hughes and Pins & Needles Productions adapted Kes Gray and Jim Field's best-selling children's book series Oi Frog and Friends for the stage. This time, Hughes played a key role in the development and writing of the script with his co-collaborators Emma Earle, Zoe Squire and Luke Bateman, as well as writing lyrics. The production premiered at Frensham Heights in October 2019 before going on to a critically acclaimed run at the Lyric Theatre in the West End. In 2020, the show was nominated for the Laurence Olivier Award for Best Family Show.

In 2022, Hughes co-wrote a charity song for the Jeff Astle Foundation titled "Stick Another Star on the Shirt", in support of the England national team at the 2022 World Cup. Written alongside Luke Bateman and Scott Dean under the name The 12th Man, the project was launched at the Thameside Theatre in Grays, Essex, and distributed on major streaming platforms in October 2022. Promotional activity included a community music video featuring local participants, an appearance on Good Morning Britain, and the commissioning of a mural visited by England midfielder Declan Rice.

=== 2026: The Boy Who Harnessed the Wind ===
In 2025, Hughes was announced as the book writer and lyricist for The Boy Who Harnessed the Wind, a stage musical based on the 2009 memoir of the same name by William Kamkwamba and Bryan Mealer, and the 2019 film adaptation by Chiwetel Ejiofor. The production, developed by the Royal Shakespeare Company, is set to premiere at the Swan Theatre, Stratford-upon-Avon in February 2026 before beginning a run at @sohoplace in London in April 2026. The production will be directed by Lynette Linton with music by Tim Sutton.

== Personal life ==
Hughes currently lives in Orsett, Essex, with his wife, Nikki, and their two children.

In May 2022 Hughes appeared on the fifth series of ITV game show Beat the Chasers.

== Musical theatre credits ==
- Mr Popper's Penguins (2015) - lyrics
- Superhero (2017) - lyrics
- Oi Frog and Friends (2019) - lyrics & book
- The Boy Who Harnessed the Wind (2026) - lyrics & book

== Awards and nominations ==
Year	Song/Musical	Award	Composer	Result	Ref.
2014	Pushy	Stiles and Drewe Best New Song Prize	Ed Bell	Finalist	
2015	Don't Look Down (from Superhero)	Stiles and Drewe Best New Song Prize	Joseph Finlay	Winner	
2015	The Original Headline Act For Christmas	Xmas Factor Best Song	Ed Bell	Finalist	
2017	The Beautiful Game	Xmas Factor All Stars Best Song	Darren Clark	Winner	
2018	Superhero	Offie for Best New Musical	Joseph Finlay	Winner	
2020	Oi Frog and Friends	Laurence Olivier Award Best Family Show	Luke Bateman	Nominated	
