= The Boy Who Harnessed the Wind (musical) =

2026 musical

- A New Musical
- West End production poster
- Music: Tim Sutton
- Lyrics: Tim Sutton; Richy Hughes
- Book: Richy Hughes
- Basis: Memoir The Boy Who Harnessed the Wind by: William Kamkwamba; Bryan Mealer; Film The Boy Who Harnessed the Wind by Chiwetel Ejiofor
- Premiere: 10 February 2026: Swan Theatre, Stratford-upon-Avon
- Productions: 2026 Stratford-upon-Avon; 2026 West End

The Boy Who Harnessed the Wind is a musical based on the 2009 memoir of the same name by William Kamkwamba and Bryan Mealer, and the 2019 film adaptation by Chiwetel Ejiofor. Music and lyrics are by Tim Sutton, and book and lyrics are by Richy Hughes.

== Production ==
=== Stratford-upon-Avon and West End (2026) ===
The musical made its world premiere as part of the Royal Shakespeare Company's season, running at the Swan Theatre, Stratford-upon-Avon, from 10 February until 28 March 2026. It was directed by Lynette Linton. Full casting was announced on 21 November 2025. Following the Stratford run, the musical transferred to @sohoplace in London's West End running from 12 April to 18 July 2026.

== Cast and characters ==
Character	Stratford-upon-Avon	West End
Character	2026	
William Kamkwamba	Alistair Nwachukwu	Alistair Nwachukwu
Trywell Kamkwamba	Sifiso Mazibuko	Sifiso Mazibuko
Agnes Kamkwamba	Madeline Appiah	Madeline Appiah
Annie Kamkwamba	Tsemaye Bob-Egbe	Tsemaye Bob-Egbe
Mike Kachigunda/Blessings	Owen Chaponda	Owen Chaponda
Chief Wimbe	McCallam Connell	McCallam Connell
Jeremiah Kamkwamba/Patience	Eddie Elliott	Eddie Elliott
Charity/Hyena	Shaka Kalokoh	Shaka Kalokoh
Gilbert Mofat	Idriss Kargbo	Idriss Kargbo
Khamba	Yana Penrose	Yana Penrose
