= Peter Redmond (roboticist) =

Irish roboticist and TV host

Peter Redmond is an Irish robotics engineer and special effects technician. He is known for his participation in television robotics competitions, the development of a Rubik's Cube-solving robot, and his appearances in science and technology outreach.

== Career ==
=== RuBot II ===
Redmond developed RuBot II, a humanoid robot capable of solving a Rubik's Cube. In 2008, it was recognised by the Guinness World Records as the fastest Rubik's Cube-solving robot, completing the puzzle in approximately 23 seconds. The robot was exhibited internationally at events such as ArtBots and the World Maker Faire.

RuBot II was the subject of coverage in technology publications including Gizmodo, SlashGear, and Technovelgy.

=== Intellectual Property and Research Spinouts ===
Redmond is listed as a co-inventor on a patent titled "Method and system for recovery of 3D scene structure and camera motion from a video sequence."

He has also been involved in projects such as WingWatch and Endodex, which originated from research conducted at Trinity College Dublin. WingWatch is an obstacle detection and collision warning system designed for large vehicles during ground manoeuvres. Endodex is a system developed to assist in the assessment of colonoscopy performance using video and motion analysis.

=== Robot Wars ===
Redmond was a founding member of Team Diotoir, which competed in the BBC television series Robot Wars. Diotoir, known for its red and black polka-dot synthetic fur, appeared in multiple UK and international competitions. The robot returned for the Robot Wars: World Series revival in 2018, representing Ireland.

Redmond later established Robo Riots, a live combat robotics event held in Dublin. The event has been covered by national media and includes robots from Robot Wars alongside machines built by independent teams.

=== Television Work ===
Redmond appeared on RTÉ's series Big Life Fix, which aired in 2020.

He has also made multiple appearances on Ireland AM, a morning television programme on Virgin Media One, where he has demonstrated robotics projects including RoboRiots.

In 2009, Discovery Channel Canada's programme Daily Planet aired a segment on his robotics work, including RuBot II and the WingWatch system. He was also featured on the Japanese television series I See The World (世界を見つける), which aired a segment focusing on RuBot II.

== Public engagement ==
Redmond has participated in outreach initiatives such as Dublin Maker and the Kildare Science Festival. He has given talks at educational and technical events including the Drogheda Arts Festival. In 2015, he gave a talk at the Bal Robotov exhibition in Moscow, a public robotics event.

In 2025, Redmond was reported to have won the District 71 humorous speech contest organised by Toastmasters International.
