= Supa Team 4 =

- Supa Team 4 cover poster
- Genre: Superhero; Action comedy
- Created by: Malenga Mulendema
- Voices of: Zowa Ngwira; Namisa Mdlalose; Kimani Arthur; Nancy Sekhokoane; Pamela Nomvete; John McMillan; Linda Sokhulu
- Opening theme: Sampa the Great
- Composers: Kevin Riepl; Andy Sturmer; Shawn Patterson
- Countries of origin: South Africa; France; United Kingdom
- Original language: English
- No. of seasons: 2
- No. of episodes: 16

Production
- Executive producers: Malenga Mulendema; Anthony Silverston; Mike Buckland; Tom van Waveren; Edward Galton; Amy Keating Rogers; Louise de Stael
- Producers: Ciara Breslin; Ceri Barnes
- Production companies: Superprod Studio; Cake Entertainment; Triggerfish Animation Studios

Original release
- Network: Netflix
- Release: July 20 – December 21, 2023

Supa Team 4 is a superhero animated television series created by Malenga Mulendema for Netflix. It was co-produced by Triggerfish Animation Studios and Cake Entertainment, and animated at Superprod Studio. Season 1 premiered on July 20, 2023 and Season 2 premiered on December 21, 2023. It has been described as the first original African animated series on the streaming platform.

== Synopsis ==
Four teenage girls in a neo-futuristic city, Lusaka, are recruited by now-retired secret agent, who want to save the world, while sticking to a budget. In the process, these girls juggle their school lives and being superheroes who fend off supervillains, turning from four friends into a superhero team, Supa Team 4.

== Characters ==
=== Main characters ===
- Linda Sokhulu as Kumbukani / Mama K (Lion), a former secret agent, who assembles Team 4, with the help of T.O.M.I. Her code name was Mkango.
- Pamela Nomvete as Ntsiki Lukhele, a friend of Mama K.
- Zowa Ngwira as Komana Mwiinga/ K-Bongo, a brilliant inventor who creates a carbon capture machine to create clean air and energy to help her father, who has severe asthma. She utilizes a high-tech bow and arrow as her special weapon. She is a member of Team 4.
- Namisa Mdlalose as Monde / M-Kozo, a girl who is close with her sister, and deemed "bringer of peace" by Mama K. She mainly uses a high-tech baton similar to her majorette one as her special weapon, and it can be doubled as a shield. She is a member of Team 4.
- Kimani Arthur as Temwe / T-Mlilo, an excitable girl who is a bit of a delinquent with a perpetual appetite, and has a high-tech ribbon wand as her special weapon. She is a member of Team 4.
- Nancy Sekhokoane as Zee / Za-Mpezi, a tall, athletic girl who is a star on the futbol team at Kamiji Secondary School. She mainly uses high-powered futbol balls as her special weapon. She is a member of Team 4.

=== Secondary characters ===
- Daniel "KStar" Lyapa as Chipo, the girls' classmate who has a crush on Komana.
- Chipo Chung as Likando, Monde's older sister and love interest of Mr. Magedzee but then broke up with him and keeps the Supa Team 4's secret. She also became the new mayor of Lusaka in the season 2 finale.
- Abubakar Salim as Principal Nkwashi, the principal of Kamiji Secondary School.
- Gary Martin as Chomps the Goat, a pet of Mama K.
- Celine Tshika as Marjory, the captain of the school majorette team.
- Sne Dladla as:
  - Geoffrey the Reporter, a local news journalist in Lusaka.
  - Mayor Sikazwe, the mayor of Lusaka who citizens believe is "corrupt". He was arrested for stealing money in the season 2 finale.
- Melvin Alusa as:
  - Prosper, the dad of Komana.
  - Ba Saasa, an old vitumbuwa vendor that Temwe frequently buys food from.
- Alanagh Nicoll as Triplets
- Thabe Ntebe as T.O.M.I., also known as "Technical Operations Management Interface", an artificial intelligence assistant who helps Mama K throughout the series.

=== Minor ===
- John Kani as Uncle Chi (Rhino), a friend of Mama K.
- Lily Banda as Towela (Leopard), a friend of Mama K and mother of Limbani, who lost her memories in the flashback. She regains her memories in the season 2 finale.
- Yinka Awoni as Chicken Man
- Alanagh Nicoll as Chawezi
- Ludo Lukwele as:
  - Sepiso
  - KSS Player 1
- Ashley Zhangazha as Vendor 1
- Sparky Xulu as Vendor 2
- Sarah Faust as:
  - Chicken
  - Female Goat
- Nalukui Mufungulwa Muchindu as:
  - Lunch Lady
  - Mom
  - Woman
  - Generic Woman
- Tshamano Sebe as:
  - Mr. Sibanda / Garbage Man
  - Person 1
  - Generic Man
  - Bad Teeth Man
- Chi Mhende as Himself
- Alanagh Nicholl as Boy

=== Villains ===
- John McMillan as Limbani / Lee Magedzee / Bad Magz, the series villain. He is the owner of his tech company and son of Towela. His true identity is revealed to the audience in the season one finale, and revealed to everyone else in the season 2 finale.
- Ashley Zhangazha as Storm Drain, a supervillain with the ability to control the weather that Team 4 defeats in the first episode.
- Sparky Xulu as Locust Pocus, a robotic engineer supervillain who controls robotic insects.
- Sne Dladia as Snap Back, a rapping supervillain who uses mind control to hypnotize his victims.
- Yinka Awoni as Alley Gator, a half man, half reptile supervillain, who is also in a romantic relationship with Professor Greenthumbs.
- Chi Mhende as Sunblock, a former vlogger turned supervillain with the ability to use her tech and steal sunlight after her vlog kept getting bad reviews.
- Abena Ayivor as Professor Greenthumbs, a scientist supervillain who can control plants and is in a romantic relationship with Alley Gator.
- Lucian Msamati as Chusi

== Episodes ==
=== Series overview ===
Series overview
| Season | Episodes | Originally released |
|---|---|---|
| 1 | 8 | July 20, 2023 |
| 2 | 8 | December 21, 2023 |

=== Season 1 (2023) ===
| No. overall | No. in season | Title | Directed by | Written by | Original release date |
|---|---|---|---|---|---|
| 1 | 1 | "Team 4 in the Byu Byu" | Dave Osborne | Ng'endo Mukii & Voline Ogutu | July 20, 2023 |
Monde, Temwe, Zikomo, and Komana save the day from a renegade tornado, and are recruited, by Mama K, to be superheroes, with all four forming "Team 4", with super suits she created. They take down a supervillain, Storm Drain, and receive public praise. In the end of the episode, an unnamed shadowy figure speaks and vows to unleash his power on Lusaka.
| 2 | 2 | "Hanger Management" | Dave Osborne | Khadidiatou Diouf | July 20, 2023 |
Temwe fails a test, but Monde, Zikomo, and Komana are able to ensure the school's principal doesn't punish her. All four are tasked by Mama K at stopping metal-eating locusts. Temwe becomes hangry and takes down some bugs with her ribbon wand, causing them to realize they are actually robotic and aren't actual insects. After she gets suspended from school, Mama K tells her she shouldn't be hot-headed, while Monde tries to calm her down. Later, they are all called to stop the locusts at the Kafue Gorge, and face the villain Locus Pocus. They make Temwe hangry, allowing them to defeat the villain, and commit themselves to helping her find "balance" in the future.
| 3 | 3 | "The Zee" | Dave Osborne | Vanessa Kanu | July 20, 2023 |
Zee practices her soccer shot, with the help of Monde, Komana, and Temwe, but the Principal says she needs to get a score in the game for the school. Later, they save the Mayor, who is hypnotized by Snap Back and almost falls off a building. He ends up hypnotizing all of them but Monde, but thanks to Mama K, they get out of it, save the Mayor, and stop Snap Back. Zee wins the game for her school, but her popularity gets to her head. Storm Drain is released by Bad Magz, to go after Zee. They fight a villain named Alley Gator, but the other members of Team 4 are annoyed with Zee's attitude. Lee Magedzee, owner of Magedzee Power Corporation (MPC), celebrates one year of the local wind farm, and Storm Drain attacks. Zee faces him and realizes that they can only defeat him as a team, together.
| 4 | 4 | "The Monde Challenge" | Jerry Forder | Maame Boateng | July 20, 2023 |
Bad Magz says he needs to bring in more villains to take down Team 4. Mama K tells them that they need to work together and to be vigilant. Monde and her sister, Marjory, reminisce about where they used to live, with Monde admitting she is homesick. At the Remove the Rubbish event, Monde does her dance, but flubs it so badly, that her other members of Team 4 are worried about her. After the event, Sibanda is recruited by Bad Magz to "change" Lusaka. Later, Monde distances herself from Zikomo, Temwe, and Komana. She decides to fight the villain on her own, Waste Man, but the others come to help, apologizing for treating her badly. They defeat him and it turns out he is Sibanda and is being mind-controlled. In the closing ceremony of the Remove the Rubbish event, Monde does the dance well, impresses everyone, putting the spotlight on her.
| 5 | 5 | "Smart Art" | Dave Osborne | Omotunde Akiode | July 20, 2023 |
Geoffrey from Zambia News reports that the upgrade to the solar power station for Lusaka has been completed, with desperation for solar power, something Bad Magz wants to exploit. He gets Snap Back to steal solar panels for him and free the vlogger, Sunny. Lee Magedzee gives Komana a scholarship for her inventions. Zikomo, Temwe, and Monde try to stop Snap Back, but he ends up hypnotizing Zee, because her earpiece isn't working. In art class, Temwe, Komana, and Zee draw circles, but Komana isn't into it. She later does a presentation to the school principal in an attempt to convince him that she can drop art class. She fails at this, but Chipo later helps her. This is interrupted when they are called by Mama K to stop Sunny, who is blocking the sun with solar panels, but they are unable to stop her at first. Working together, they are able to divert the power she is generating back to the city, and defeat her. Komana develops "smart art", but gets no distinction, but Lee Magedzee praises it.
| 6 | 6 | "Missing Kid" | Dave Osborne & Jerry Forder | Tshepo Moche | July 20, 2023 |
The girls of Team 4 offer to help Mama 4, but she turns them down, and tasks them with watching Chomps. They go to the secret base and Monde comes up with a plan, trying to get Zee, Temwe, or Komana to watch the goat, as she needs to study for a test. Mama K meets with Rhino, who tells him about a special box found in Towela's house. Later, Monde tries to pass off the goat to Temwe, and the goat causes a ruckus in her room. Then, she passes off the goat to Zee, and it goes in the pen with the other goats, until she realizes what the goat is doing. Zee then does the same, dropping it off at Komana's house, but she refuses to accept it. Later, the Alley Gator is taking down power lines, but Team 4 struggles to fight him as Chomps is there, until he disappears. They search for the goat everywhere but she comes in with Mama K. It is revealed that the goat was trained as a spy.
| 7 | 7 | "Herstory" | Jerry Forder | Gloria Huwiler | July 20, 2023 |
Alley Gator fights Team 4 and they catch up stealing avocados from the marketplace, until Storm Drain shows up. The villains escape and Mama K's drone follows another drone watching the scene, but it also flees. When they go down to the base for a briefing, Mama K is evasive and tells them to go home, making Monde and Temwe suspicious, while Zee and Komana don't feel the same way. They have five Mama K tea and biscuits, so she will reveal the truth to them, with each of them encouraging her. She shows them about Chusi and believes he is back in Lusaka, while revealing her real name. She tells the story of when she was a leader of a secret crime-fighting team at IAZ (Intelligence Agency of Zambia) and the spies who worked with her, with Chusi stealing top-secret information. Later, Chusi confronts them, causing him to wipe the memory of Mama K's comrade, Towela, and blind her other comrade, Rhino. Later, Mama K refuses to let Team 4 help her take down Chusi, but they convince her otherwise.
| 8 | 8 | "Brain Power Part One" | Jerry Forder | Vanessa Kanu | July 20, 2023 |
Chusi demands that Alley Gator dig in the ground for Zambinite and tasks Professor Greenthumbs. She resolves to get their gear so they can find out who is behind Team 4. Temwe is called to the Principal's office for skipping class and threatens her, saying she will be banned from volunteering with Mama K if she fails her chemistry test. She then believes that the school principal is Chusi. Team 4 goes to the park, where they meet Professor Greenthumbs, who is controlling a few trees, and she steals Temwe's glove. Mama K tells them they can't always depend on their gear and tells them to get creative, with Komana building her a new glove. Temwe tells the other girls that the Principal is Chusi, but Zee and Komana don't believe him. Chusi studies the globe taken from Temwe in hopes of undermining Team 4. Temwe tries to "prove" the Principal is Chusi, but is unsuccessful. Team 4 tracks down the baobob tree to an abandoned mine. The Principal talks to Mama K and tells her that Temwe should be at school rather than volunteering there, saying she reminds him of himself when he was her age. The plant monster that Professor Greenthumbs activates defeats Team 4 and pulls them inside the mine, with their super suits deactivated in the process. In a final scene, the man that the girls believe is Chusi takes off his mask and shows his face to the audience, revealing that he is Mr. Magedzee.

=== Season 2 (2023) ===
| No. overall | No. in season | Title | Directed by | Written by | Original release date |
|---|---|---|---|---|---|
| 9 | 1 | "Brain Power Part Two" | Valentina Ventimiglia | Tshepo Moche | December 21, 2023 |
The four protagonists wake up and are in the abandoned mine, tied up by Professor Greenthumbs. They work in a crafty way so the villains cannot uncover their identities. Mama K, who was skeptical of the Principal, arrives as they leave the mine. Greenthumbs tied up, left for the police, and Bad Magz flies away, but not before he takes a photo of Mama K's van. Later, when analyzing the photo, he sees an intriguing ring on her finger, which piques his interest.
| 10 | 2 | "Zee vs. Tee" | Jerry Forder | Malenga Mulendema | December 21, 2023 |
Zee and Temwe begin competing with one another and swap lives to see how difficult each other's lives are. At first, both find it easy, but as time goes on, they understand the other person's situation. Meanwhile, Komona helps Monde overcome her worries, which have made have issues with focusing on anything. Later, Bad Magz tracks down the owner of the ring: Chi. He attempts to subdue him and fails, with Chi fleeing. However, he picks up a computer and disk, and sees that it is a gold mine of information.
| 11 | 3 | "Click Bait" | Valentina Ventimiglia | Khadidiatou Diouf | December 21, 2023 |
Team 4 saves people before they fall into the rubble and the news announcer is glad Team 4 is there to save the day. Bad Magz chastises Ally-Gator for digging too close to the surface, causing cracks, and is told to dig deeper to find Zambinite. Marjory gives Komana an invite because she let her cheat off her chemistry test, but Komana denies it. Temwe tries to get an invite. Ally Gator finds the Zambinite, but Bad Magz has to wait for the hack to the computer he stole. Team 4 goes to the site of more sinkholes in downtown Lusaka, but Temwe goes off to a concert. Bag Magz doesn't like this, so he calls in the "exterminator." Temwe gets in the party thanks to a disguise. Marjory tries to stop Click from leaving the party. The rest of Team 4 save people and don't hear from Temwe because she is at the concert. Temwe gets on stage with Click, but Marjory is incensed. Later, Temwe's teammates arrive at the party and are surprised to see Locus Pocus. They struggle to fight the locusts until they fire a confetti cannon at him and tie him up. Temwe promises to not let anyone get between them again. Click later seeks out Temwe and says he won't stop until he finds her. Later, it is revealed the Greenthumbs was broken out of prison to process the Zambinite.
| 12 | 4 | "Majorette Problem" | Jerry Forder | Voline Ogutu | December 21, 2023 |
Monde rushes because the Rocking Gemstones are auditioning for the National Majorette Competition. There are divided views on Team 4 on campus. Bad Magz fails to crack the disk he found and Greenthumbs tells him they have hit a roadblock with the Zambinite. Monde goes to harsh practice, with the Principal putting a lot of pressure on Marjory. After her friends encourage her, she agrees to become the captain of the team, surprising Marjory. Bad Magz, after hearing that the Zambinite is combustible, decides the Zambinite needs to be frozen so it doesn't overheat. All of the performers join Monde and abandon Marjory. Mama K is unnerved when she learns that Chi's computer, blueprints, and disc are gone. Monde says that even though Marjory bullies them, it isn't right to bully Marjory back. Later, Monde has a heart-to-heart with Majory. Storm Drain strains to keep freezing the Zambinite, which gives off a bad smell before the energy is extracted. Greenthumbs calls on Ally Gator for help in disposing waste from the processing of Zambinite. Later, Snap Back appears so that the field can be cleared, which he does with a hypnotic rap. Marjory raps back at him so that the performers can be saved and is later joined by Monde. Snap Back escapes, Snap Back is arrested, and Marjory apologizes to Team 4. Bad Magz breaks into the code after many attempts.
| 13 | 5 | "Sisters Before Misters" | Jerry Forder | Ng'endo Mukii | December 21, 2023 |
Temwe runs through a food market, as she is tired after a chemistry test. They run into Monde's sister, Likando, who is going on a date with Mr. Magedzee. They are all glad she was asked out. Likando likes him, but finds him mysterious, like he has secrets. When she says that secrets always get out, they get worried that people will find out they are superheroes. Monde is worried because she wants to keep no secrets from her sister. Meanwhile, Bad Magz demands his calendar is cleared, meaning he stands up Likando for their date, with Monde attempting to console her. The next day, they talk about the date cancellation, with Komana saying she will "prove" Mr. Magedzee isn't hiding anything. They tail him for an entire day. Later, he happily works to complete the hacking, and Komana finds that he is keeping secrets. After her suit activates, the other girls join her, and they are able to defeat Storm Drain. Although Komana is convinced that he is up to no good, Monde doesn't believe her. Later, Lee comes to apologize to Likando and attempts to recruit her to help secure the Zambinite. She agrees with him, saying she won't tell anyone about it.
| 14 | 6 | "A Zambinite to Remember" | Valentina Ventimiglia | Gloria Huweiler | December 21, 2023 |
Alley Gator dumps toxic waste, from the processing of Zambinite, in the Lusaka sewers. The girls suit up and find him near the sewers. They are able to knock him out and have arrested, and taken away. Mr. Magedzee tells his assistant, Ms. Prudent, that now he has Likando's trust, getting control of the Mayor will be "automatic." He puts on a presentation about the processing of Zambinite, which is called "Magz Power," without a mention of the toxic waste. He claims it will end blackouts and load shedding. He tells the scholarship recipients that whoever signs up the most Magz Power subscribers will get an internship at his corporation. Komana's dad tells her that the internship is the way in for her career. The next day, she recruits people for Magz Power. Monde, Temwe, and Zee investigate the crime scene at the urging from Mama K. A few days later, Komana is still "busy" and isn't helping her teammates. Mama K gets called by Chi. Greenthumbs brings up that Alley Gator was arrested, but Bad Magz pushes her off. Later, Chi gives Mama K a Zambinite crystal and she decides to sleep in his house for the night. Mr. Magadzee, in a huge ceremony, turns on his "alternate energy source," filling Lusaka with light. He then gives Komana an internship at his corporation. She is overjoyed, but her other team members are worried, as they fear she is leaving Team 4.
| 15 | 7 | "The Perfect Storm Part One" | Jerry Forder | Tshepo Moche | December 21, 2023 |
They watch a news broadcast in which people are coughing and scratching themselves. Monde thinks something is seriously wrong. She convinces Temwe and Zee to join her. Zee is concerned, saying this isn't right without Komana. Meanwhile, Komana is worried about her dad, who is worried about all the commitments she has. Chi tells Mama K that the Zambinite is connected to the "masked man" (Bad Magz). Across Lusaka, people are having rashes, inflammation in eyes, coughing, and other impacts, with Monde wondering what is going on. Temwe goes to the market and everyone is leaving because they are sick. They talk to Komana and Monde says it happened after Magz Power was turned on, which Komana dismisses. Later, she puts the pieces together and realizes that Mr. Magedzee found Zambinite. After talking to her teammates, she resolves to tell Mr. Magedzee about this. Mama K returns to the HQ. Likando agrees to give the contract to Mr. Magedzee personally. The girls begin to be skeptical of Mr. Magedzee's timing, but Komana isn't convinced. Mama K analyzes the results and tries to uncover the villain. When Komana calls the school, she uncovers that Mr. Magedzee lied about his past, and comes to the conclusion he is behind everything, at the same time as Mama K, who sees Bad Magz in front of her. The girls decide to bust into his corporation. They are faced with Greenthumbs.
| 16 | 8 | "The Perfect Storm Part Two" | Valentina Ventimiglia | Vanessa Kanu | December 21, 2023 |
The girls face off against Greenthumbs, while Mama K is in danger. She later finds herself in Mr. Magedzee's office. Monde reveals who she is to her sister, Likando. It is revealed that Bad Magz's mother was in the Intelligence Agency of Zambia, surprising Chi and Mama K and realizing that he's Limbani, Towela's son. He claims that Mama K "made him" who he is today. Later, Mr. Magedzee says he has Lusaka in the palm of his hand, then Africa, then the world. Team 4 urges him to turn off his power source, saying it is hurting those across the city, but he doesn't listen. He brings in Towela and blames Mama K for causing his mom's memory to get erased. Some time later, Mr Magedzee learns that Chusi was one who erased her mother, Mama K talks to Mr. Magedzee and convinces him to use the Brainstorm to restore her memories. Likando has the police arrest him. Just then, a monster causes a cave-in and captures Komana, the ZambiMonster made by Greenthumbs, and they struggle to fight it. Mr. Magedzee agrees to help and save Komana. He ends up saving her, and the monster explodes, to the chagrin of Greenthumbs. Later, Mr. Magedzee says he will do whatever it takes to fix things. The other team members comfort Komana. The narrator notes that the villains have been locked up, the corrupt mayor was arrested, and Likando is now running to be Lusaka's mayor. Komana's device makes the city's energy clean, and green. The team all meets in the HQ. In a final scene, Chusi declares he is back and wants to cause terror in Lusaka again.

== Production ==
In April 2019, Netflix announced that Supa Team 4 had begun production, and said it joined their "growing slate of original animated programming" designed for families and kids. It was said to draw visual inspiration from "retro-’90s R&B and hip hop girl groups."

In May 2023, it was announced that Anthony Silverston, Mike Buckland, Tom van Waveren, Edward Galton, and Amy Keating Rogers would be executive producers, along with Ciara Breslin as producer. The series is produced by Ciara Breslin, Cake Entertainment, Triggerfish Animation Studios and French studio Superprod Studio. In June 2023, the series was described as being eight-parts long, and featuring actors such as John Kani, Pamela Nomvete, Nancy Sekhokoane, and Sparky Xulu. It was also stated that the series would be dubbed into isiZulu, and have Zambian rapper and singer-songwriter Sampa the Great, creating the theme song, with the help of her production company, Mag44.

It was released on July 20, 2023, on Netflix. The second season premiered on December 21, 2023. As of December 2025, no news about a third season has been announced.
