= Ng'endo Mukii =

Kenyan animator and filmmaker

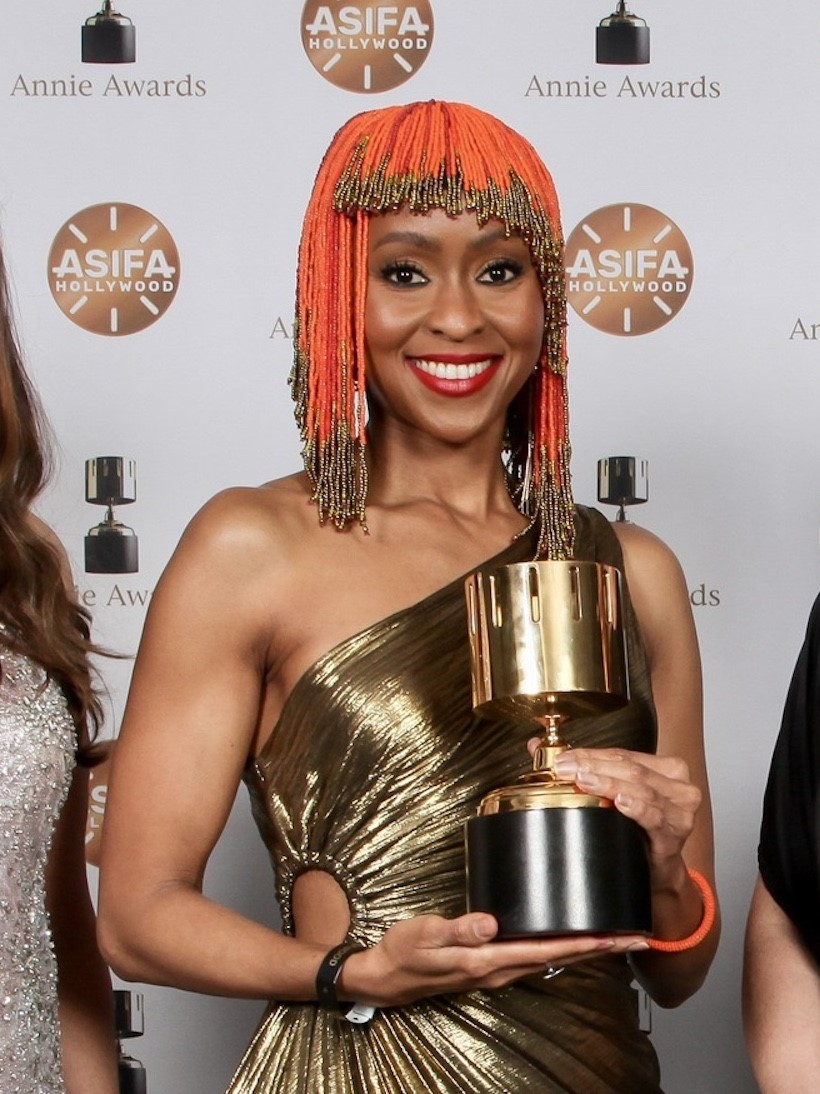
- Mukii at the 2024 Annie Awards
- Born: Kenya
- Education: Rhode Island School of Design (BFA); Royal College of Art (MA)
- Occupations: Animator, filmmaker, writer
- Years active: 2012–present
- Notable work: Yellow Fever (2012); Nairobi Berries (2017); Enkai (2023)

Ng'endo Mukii is a Kenyan animator, filmmaker, and writer whose work explores themes of identity, culture, and social issues through animation.

== Early life and education ==
Mukii was born in Kenya. She studied at the Rhode Island School of Design, where she obtained a Bachelor of Fine Arts, and later earned a Master of Arts in Animation from the Royal College of Art in London.

== Career ==
Mukii's work often combines animation with documentary elements to examine social and cultural issues.

Her film Yellow Fever (2012 film), produced as her graduation project at the Royal College of Art, explores the impact of Eurocentric beauty standards on African women. The film incorporates mixed media techniques, including live action, stop-motion, and hand-drawn animation.

The film received international recognition and won the Silver Hugo Award for Best Animated Short at the Chicago International Film Festival.

Mukii has directed several other films, including This Migrant Business (2015) and Nairobi Berries (2017), the latter of which received the Immersive Encounters Grand Prix in 2017.

In 2023, she directed Enkai, an episode of the Disney+ animated anthology series Kizazi Moto: Generation Fire.

Mukii has also worked as a writer on the animated series Supa Team 4, produced for Netflix.

She has participated in international development programs such as the Toronto International Film Festival Filmmaker Lab.

== Style and themes ==
Mukii's work has been noted for its exploration of African identity and critique of globalized beauty standards.

She has also discussed the use of animation to challenge representations of African people and to explore alternative narratives.

== Awards and recognition ==
Mukii has received several awards for her work in animation and film.

- Silver Hugo Award, Best Animated Short, Yellow Fever (Chicago International Film Festival, 2013)
- Africa Magic Viewers’ Choice Award, Best Short Film, Yellow Fever (2013)
- Kalasha Film Award, Best Animation Production, Yellow Fever (2015)
