= Ng'endo Mūkīi =

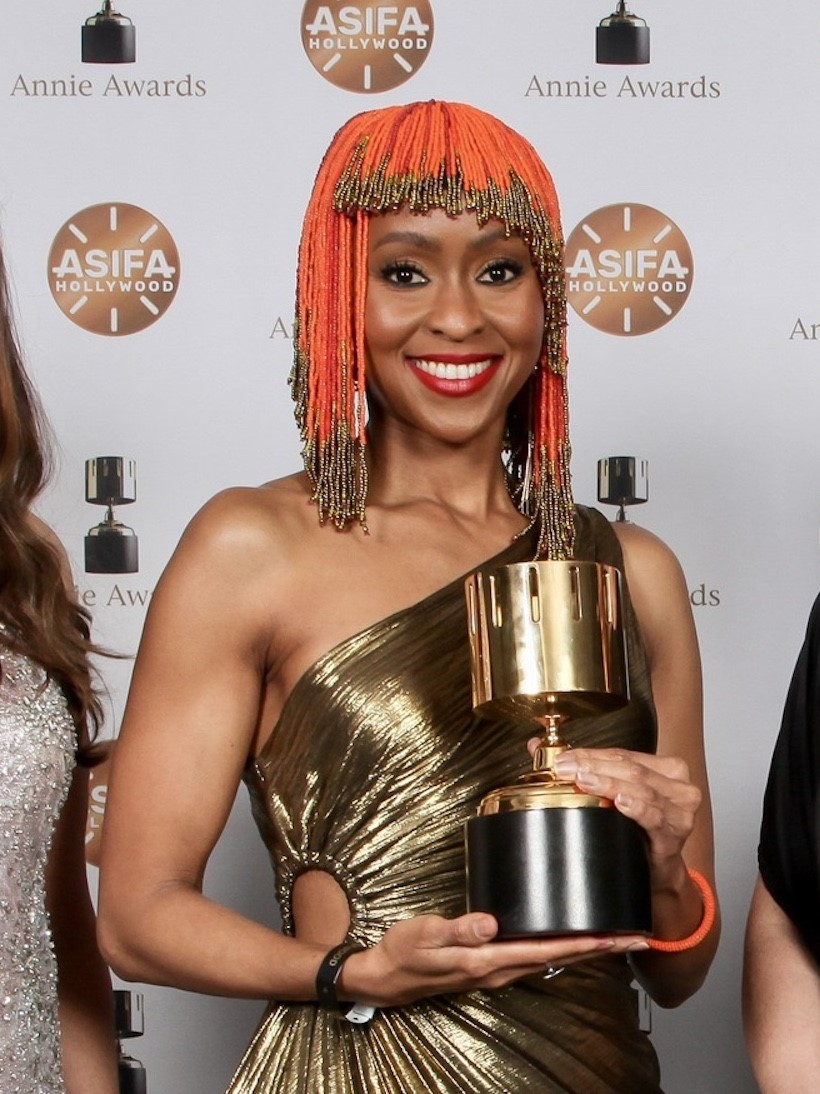
Ng'endo Mukii, Annie Award Winner in the Best Limited Series category for Enkai (2024)

Ng'endo Mūkīi is a Kenyan award winning animation director, writer, and professor of animation. Ng'endo Mūkīi is an Annie Award and Silver Hugo Award-winner, and British Animation Award-nominated film director. She is most well known for 'Enkai', an episode in the Disney+ and Triggerfish All-African animated anthology, Kizazi Moto (Generation Fire), and 'Yellow Fever,' her documentary-animation on African women's identity, colorism, self-image and Western influences on beauty. In 2018 she participated in the Toronto International Film Festival's professional development program, the Filmmaker Lab program that brought together 22 emerging directors from all over the world. That year, she was the only filmmaker selected from the African continent. She presented her talk, ‘Film Taxidermy and Re-Animation' at the prestigious Design Indaba conference in Cape Town, South Africa. She was a writer on Netflix's first African animated series, Supa Team 4. She is a professor of the Practice at the School of the Museum of Fine Arts at TUFTS university, teaching traditional and computer-based 2D animation. Her independent filmmaking focuses on relationships, the separation between perception and reality, and the use of mixed media to represent unspoken truths concerning indigenous communities. Her mixed-media and inter-genre approach to filmmaking, particularly focused on the experiences of African women, gives her an incredibly unique visual language and makes her a preeminent voice in animation.

== Early life ==
Ng'endo was born in Nairobi, Kenya. Her mother, Njeri Kariūki, featured in Ng'endo's documentary animation film Kesho Pia Ni Siku. Her family and childhood experiences introduced and inspired her journey into creativity and arts. In an interview by Design Indaba, she comments that her father, Mūkīi Mereka, would set plates of fruit on the table and ask her and her siblings to draw them. Her father taught and encouraged her to draw, which set off her artistic practice. While studying illustration at the Rhode Island School of Design, she took classes in time-based media, and ended up majoring in FAV, (film, animation, and video.) Ng'endo was also interested in literature and learning languages, and all these eventually led her to mixed-media and cross-genre filmmaking.

== Education ==
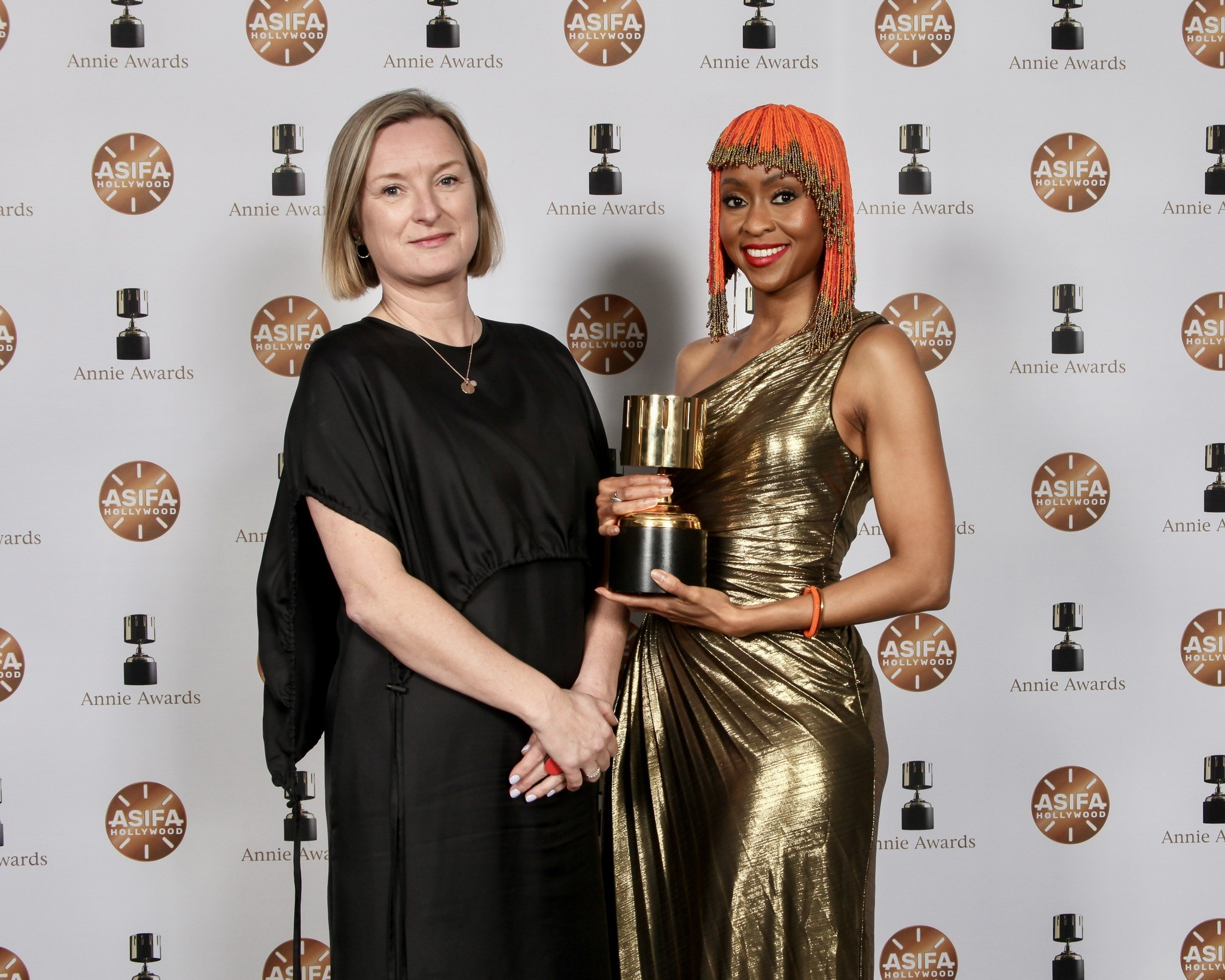
Ng'endo Mukii(right), the writer and director of 'Enkai' with Ellen Collins(left) a producer on 'Enkai'

Ng'endo attended Loreto Convent Msongari primary school in Nairobi, and Tigoni Academy for Girls, Limuru, for high school. She completed her A Levels at Hillcrest Secondary School, Nairobi, and graduated in 2001. She attained her Bachelor of Fine Arts in Film Animation and Video at the Rhode Island School of Design and graduated in 2006. She attained a Master of Arts in Animation from the Royal College of Art where she graduated in 2012. Part of her dissertation at the RCA compared ethnographic filmmaking to the process of taxidermy, the action of deleting, drying out and editing an indigenous species for the sake of representing it as an icon in a foreign context, which is evident in Western presentation of African realities. She is an alumna of the Berlinale Talents 2014/2015, the Urucu Media REALNESS Screenwriter’s Residency 2018, and the Goethe Institute Bahia Vila Sul artists’ residency and was an Artist in Residence at "Grafikens Hus", supported in conjunction with Iaspis, the Swedish Arts Grants Committee's international program for Visual and Applied Artists in November 2015.

== Professorship ==
Mūkīi is a professor of the Practice at the School of the Museum of Fine Arts at TUFTS teaching Animation, Character design and character animation.

Ng'endo specializes in traditional and computer-based 2D animation, focusing on character design and documentary-animation practices. She has created four boutique syllabi on fundamental techniques of character development, design, movement, gesture, and expression. She emphasizes exploring personal and societal histories while integrating mixed-media animation methodologies. Ng'endo also runs an advanced After Effects class on inverse-kinetics and pose-based rigging systems. She leads project-based Independent and Directed Studies courses for seniors and graduate students who require customized guidance. She participates in grassroots organization and institutional policy review through committee service, including the Institutional Inclusive Excellence Committee, and serves on the Women, Gender, and Sexualities Studies Faculty Advisory Board.

== Film and indigenous realities ==
Ng’endo’s work focuses on relationships, the separation between perception and reality, and the use of mixed media to represent unspoken truths about indigenous communities. She narrates Africa from an African perspective, circumventing popular Western perspectives and presentations of the lived realities of Africans. These themes are depicted in the films Enkai, Yellow Fever, Kesho Pia Ni Siku, Far from Home, and Kitwana's Journey amongst others. Her African Identity, culture and experience as an African woman play a crucial role in her creative process and inspiration. She uses mixed media, blending photography, printmaking, live action, 2D, 3D and stop-motion animation, and the poetry of spoken word in film. Her work is also mixed-genre, often creating documentary-animation as well as reality-based fiction.

Ng'endo's film, "Yellow Fever", illustrates Western influences on the ideals of beauty and its impact on African women. It explores the erosion of African ideals and introduction of colorism and hair-texturism, leading to African women becoming uncomfortable in their melanin skin. Women take even harmful measures to bleach their skin to achieve lighter skin tones associated with beauty, intelligence, and class. "Yellow Fever" also addresses the trickling down of beauty standards through generations, and the ways through which social institutions of colonization continue to devalue and condemn African culture and identity. The idea of beauty is globalised, creating homogenous aspirations, and distorting indigenous people’s self-image. The film focuses on African women’s self-image using mixed media and mixed genres to describe the self-visualization that many African women grow up with.

In 2015, as the Design Indaba Conference speaker, she presented her keynote, Film Taxidermy and Re-Animation, proposing the use of animation as a means of re-humanizing the ‘indigenous’ image, a people whose ‘real’ image is burdened by stereotypes of being the ‘Other'. Ngendo proposed that "by permeating physical, linguistic, and cultural barriers, animation can bring people closer to each other and make them human again." Ng'endo affirmed that animation can be used to "emulate something that is intangible, something that is humanity.

Ng'endo created films for Out of Sight (2017),a 360 virtual reality series by Huffington post reflecting on diseases that afflict people in African countries. The animations featured Lymphatic Filariasis commonly known as Elephantiasis(Nigeria), Sleeping sickness (Congo), and River Blindness, a major cause of preventable blindness in developing nations.

== Kizazi Moto: Generation fire and Enkai ==
The 10-part Disney anthology, Kizazi Moto:Generation Fire draws from Africa’s diverse histories and cultures to deliver sci-fi and fantasy stories from uniquely African perspectives. "Enkai", written and directed by Ng'endo, achieved a significant milestone by winning animation's highest honor, Annie Awards, as the Best TV/Media - Limited Series at the 51st Annie Awards (2024). Variety Magazine referred to ‘Kizazi Moto’ as a “watershed moment” for African animation. The anthology introduces 10 diverse stories from the African continent, including Egypt, Kenya, Nigeria, South Africa, Uganda, and Zimbabwe.

Enkai incorporates Kenyan culture and symbolism, specifically Agīkūyū cultural elements, to create a mesmerizing Afrofuturist mother and daughter story. The 11-minute-short film was produced by Blink Industries, in collaboration with South African studio Triggerfish Animation. ‘Enkai’ is a culmination of several years of Ng’endo’s exploration into mixed media filmmaking. She worked specifically with Blink to produce a creative experience of CGI, 2D and stop-motion animation worlds, all seen through the eyes of a goddess child.

== Yellow fever ==
Yellow Fever was Ng'endo's thesis project at the Royal College of Art in London. It won the Silver Hugo for The Best Animated Short at the Chicago International Film Festival, among other awards and multiple nominations. The title comes from Fela Kuti's song, Yellow Fever, which criticizes women for their use of skin-bleaching products. Rather than lambasting women for practicing beauty ritual such as skin bleaching, Yellow Fever, the film interrogates societal pressures that incline women to these practices in the first place. It depicts three generations of women in conversation about beauty; the narrator (Ng'endo), her mother and her niece. Through the interviews, poetry and recollection, the film explores how visual media (TV) influences understandings of beauty from a young age, which are then reinforced in women-only spaces such as hair salons, and performed as indicators of class and wealth in Nairobi's communities. She challenges Western influence and media-created standards of beauty that demean and distort African women's identity, image, and esteem. Rather than criticizing women who bleach their skins and manipulate their appearances, she views the problem as an existing social issue echoing racist eugenicist theories of race and intelligence. This pressure is no longer exerted by colonialists but by the society itself and its institutions.

== Kesho pia ni siku (2021) ==
In 2020, Ng'endo was among 8 directors selected from around the globe for the Vimeo Series "Stories In Place". The grant highlighted talented creators and small businesses that support communities impacted by racial injustice. The second edition of the series focused on Black filmmakers. Ng'endo was chosen alongside six other Black filmmakers, four in the United States and two in the United Kingdom. Her film tells a personal story about her mother Njeri Kariūki, who runs Kanyoko Boutique in Nairobi, Kenya, a business she started from the boot of her 1990 Toyota Corolla. The film shows the social and economic struggles and experiences of Kenyan women through the life of Ng'endo's mother. The film combines animation, archival photography and live action. It was the first in the Vimeo series to get over 100,000 views.

Ng'endo stated that,

"There is so much trauma and harm that happens to women in Kenya, and everywhere else. And there is an idea that their silence serves best to protect the community, which protects the perpetrator's image which is wrapped in the family's image. A victims' story is deemed unimportant and they are taught to stay in shame and be quiet or to forgive and forget, especially women and people in marginalized communities."

== Filmography ==
Sources:

- Enkai (2023)
- Kesho Pia Ni Siku: Tomorrow Is Another Day (2021).
- Far from Home (2020), a short film on the experiences of migrant African women working in the Middle East.
- Kitwana's journey (2019)
- Homage to Wangarī Maathai (2019)
- Portrait of Marielle (2018)
- 360 Huffington Post Series, Out of Sight: River Blindness, Sleeping sickness, Elephantiasis (2018)
- Nairobi Berries (2017). It was Ng'endo's first 360 Virtual reality film which won the inaugural Encounters Immersive Grand Prix.It is Kenya’s first 360 Virtual Reality film incorporating animation and live-action. “The title, Nairobi Berries, is a play on words,‘Nairoberry’ refers to high crime rate and robbery in Nairobi. Ng'endo contemplates on why the culture is endemic and what creates pervasive hording and crime. She views it as the ‘fruits promised’, Nairobi Berries, the dream to one day live lavishly and reap the bounty that Nairobi city has to offer. The film was supported by Electric South’s New Dimensions Grant, an award that supports African artists from diverse creative disciplines to explore 360 filmmaking.
- In the NET-MED Youth Films (2017), Ng'endo created henna pattern-based animations for the United Nations Educational, Scientific and Cultural Organization (UNESCO) series promoting peace projects in Mediterranean countries. The episode focused on a volunteer named Ahmad, who lives in war-torn Libya and creates projects to offer opportunities and information to the youth who hardly have any opportunities aside from joining armed conflict or migrating.
- The Conductor, as part of Plan International's #GirlsTakeOver campaign for the 2016 International Day of the Girl. The girls’ takeover of governments, schools and businesses was organized worldwide to show what girls can achieve today and in the future, and the series of films supported the run up to the events.
- This Migrant Business (2016). It was commissioned by the Danish Refugee Council, and highlights life challenges that make people leave African countries for the Middle East and Europe. The film interrogates the commodification of migrants and refugees by human traffickers while positioning the audience as smugglers.
- MTINDO (2016) is a short film that Ng'endo created for Fashion Africa 254’s launch of their publication Mtindo: Style Movers Rebranding Africa. She also wrote and narrated the poem in the film.
- Desert Haze (2013)
- Hasidi 2013
- More Fanta less serious (2012)
- Untitled:Dust (2012)
- Hasidi (2012)
- Yellow fever (2012)

== Studios and collaborations ==
- Blink Industries International 2025. Director: Mukii joined the roster of directors that Blink Inc works with internationally, and officially completed her directorial debut with the Malaria No More UK (MNMUK) campaign film, Zero Malaria: Change the Story 3. She was the animation director,and generated a series of concepts and worked with her team in London to pitch the ideas to the MNMUK producers.
- Triggerfish Foundation & UNESCO Creator Labs. Director of the Lab For Women International from January to April 2025. She was a Juror and Masterclass Mentor: Mukii was part of the team that set goals for the Creator Labs program that seeks to combat the underrepresentation of women in animation leadership positions across Africa.
- Goodgate Media International. Consulting Art Director, January to April 2024. She was in charge of the visual aspects of game development for the Vertical Slice Prototype Project for the video game "How May I Assist?"
- Disney+ & Triggerfish Studios International. Film Director & Writer, 2021: More than 70 leading directors and creators across the continent were invited to pitch their ideas after a multi-year research phase. 15 shortlisted projects were mentored by Academy Award-winning director Peter Ramsey and the creative teams from Triggerfish and Disney. Ngendo's short film, Enkai, was selected in the Kizazi Moto:Generation Fire anthology.
- Vimeo & Mailchimp USA / Kenya. Film Director, 2021:She was one of 8 directors selected from around the globe for the Vimeo Stories In Place Spring 2021 grant.
- Ng’endo Studios Nairobi, Kenya, 2014, Director: She works with local organizations, including projects commissioned for Huffington Post and Plan International. She is a recipient of funding from the New Dimensions Virtual Reality program (South Africa), Docubox Kenya, and Focus Features Africa First (USA) grants.
- Netflix & Triggerfish Animation StudiosSouth Africa / Kenya. Writer on the Mama K’s Team 4 (WT) animated series.After a continent-wide application process, Ng'endo was one of the 8 all-female writing team selected to work on the series. She punched up the comedy and helped localize the spoken language in the scripts based on Lusakan colloquialisms.

== Awards and honors ==
Mūkīi has been awarded the following honors.

- Annie Award, Best Limited Series Animated Television/Media Production for Kizazi Moto: Generation Fire including the episode Enkai at the 51st Annie Awards 2024.

Yellow Fever won several awards:

- The Silver Hugo for Best Animated Short, 49th Chicago International Film Festival, USA October 2013
- The Best Student Film at the Underexposed Film Festival 2013
- The Best Animation at This is England Rouen Short Film Festival, Rouen, France, November 2013.
- Best Experimental Short Film, Black Star Film Festival, USA August 2014
- Yellow fever won the Best Short Film, Africa Magic Viewers’ Choice Awards, Lagos, Nigeria March 2013
- Yellow Fever won the Best Animation, 7th Kenya International Film Festival, Nairobi, Kenya November 2012
- Best Student Film, Underexposed Film Festival, SC, USA November 2013
- Best Short Film, AfriKamera Film Festival, Warsaw, Poland April 2014
- 3rd place in Documentary Category at the Afrinolly Short Film Competition, February 2014
- Special Mention, 59th Oberhausen International Short Film Festival, Germany May 2013

-This Migrant Business film won the Best Animation Production at the Kalasha Awards 2015

-Nairobi Berries, won the Encounters Immersive Grand Prix at the Encounters Short Film Festival in the UK in 2017.

== Nominations ==
2018: Prix Jeunesse International nomination for Nairobi Berries

2013: Nominated for Best Short Film at the Africa Movie Academy Awards for Yellow Fever

2012: Nominated for Best Short Film at the Colours of the Nile Film Festival, Ethiopia for Yellow Fever

2012: Nominated in The Nahemi Student Film Awards at the Encounters Short Film Festival, UK for Yellow Fever
