= Power Racing Series =

- Formation: 2009
- Founder: Jim Burke
- Type: 501(c)(3) organization
- Location: United States
- Website: powerracingseries.org

The Power Racing Series (PRS) is an American amateur racing series and nonprofit organization in which participants build and race electric vehicles modeled on children's ride-on toy cars. Founded in Chicago in 2009 by Jim Burke and members of the hackerspace Pumping Station: One, it expanded to Maker Faire events around the United States. Teams compete for race results and for audience-awarded "Moxie" points based on presentation and entertainment.

== Competition format ==
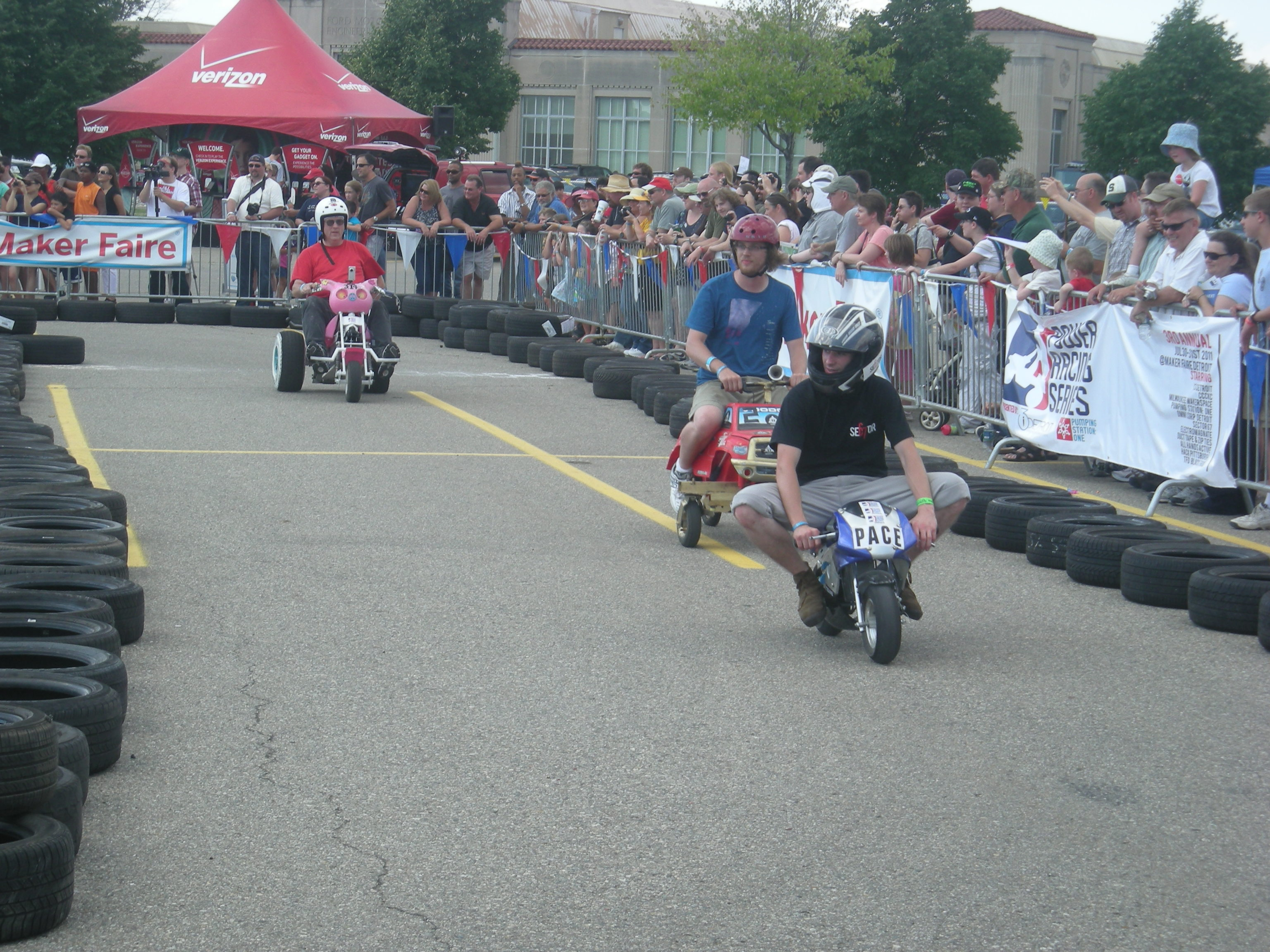
A Power Racing Series event at Maker Faire Detroit in 2011

The cars retain elements of a children's ride-on vehicle but can be rebuilt with new frames, batteries, motors, wheels, and controls. The series uses a capped modification budget to keep entry affordable and encourage resourceful engineering; the limit has varied between seasons, from $500 in 2013 to $600 at a 2025 event.

Events have included sprint and endurance races. In addition to points for finishing position, spectators can award Moxie points for a team's theme, vehicle decoration, costumes, and other crowd entertainment.

== History ==
Burke and a friend developed the idea after finding a motorized toy car in a Chicago dumpster in 2009. Burke and colleagues at Pumping Station: One began modifying and racing similar vehicles, with six teams taking part in the first event on a vacant lot.

In 2010, Pumping Station: One expanded the competition to Maker Faires in Kansas City, Missouri, and Detroit. The Detroit event included drag, road-course, and endurance races. More than 20 teams participated during the 2011 season, many representing hackerspaces in the Midwestern United States.

By 2013, the series reported 29 certified teams and a five-event schedule spanning California, Missouri, Michigan, Indiana, and New York. It continued to expand nationally; a 2019 profile described events in cities across the country and emphasized the competition's role as an accessible engineering challenge.

The organizing body later became a registered 501(c)(3) nonprofit and broadened its educational activities to include grants, do-it-yourself fairs, and a combat robotics league. The series remained active in 2025. A race at Maker Faire Lynchburg that year drew teams from several states, including four cars from the University of Indianapolis.

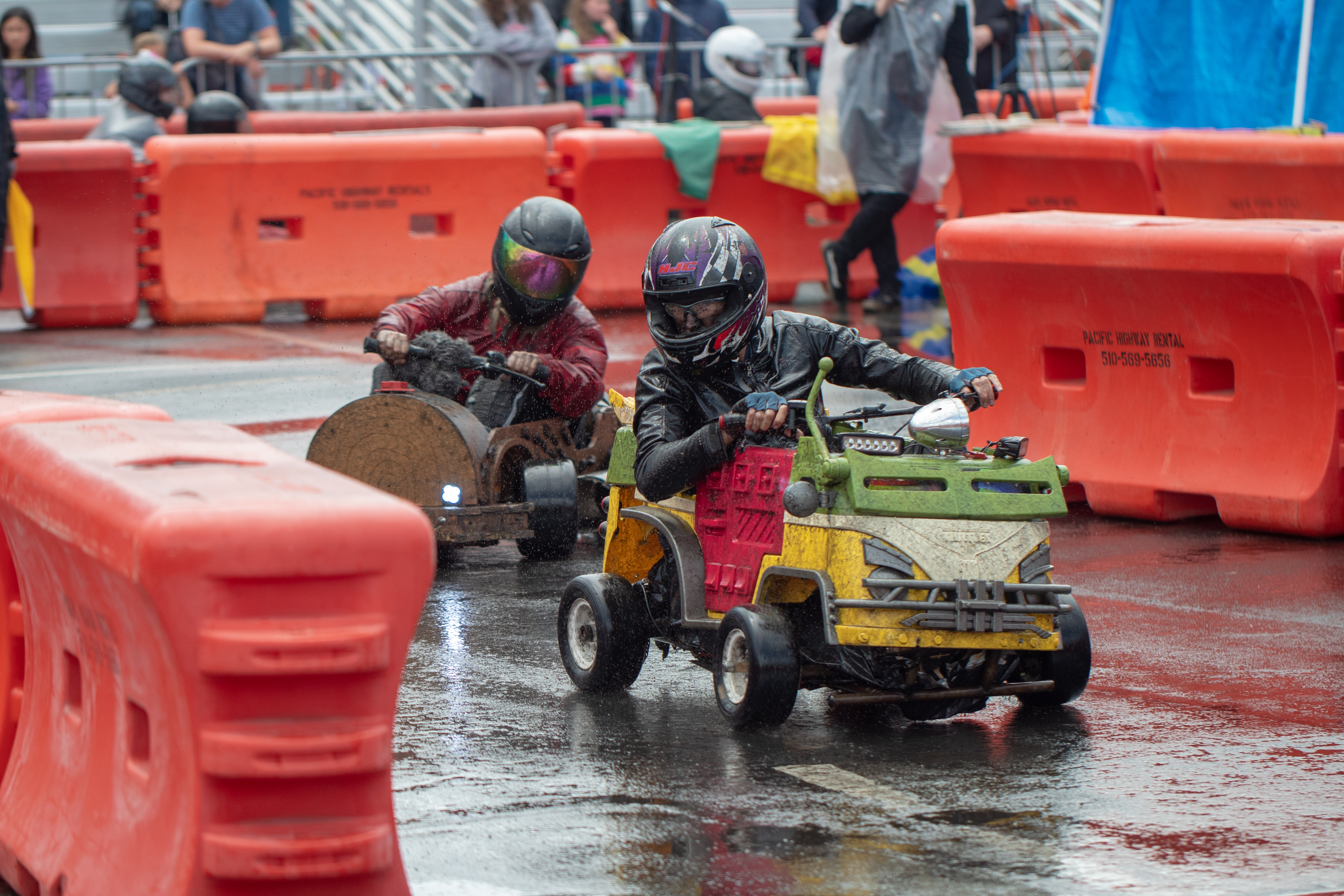
A Power Racing Series event at Maker Faire Bay Area in 2019
