= Masitala =

Village in central Malawi

Coordinates: 12°58′S 33°28′E

Masitala is a village in Kasungu District, central Malawi. Its population is about 200 and the spoken languages are Chichewa and Chitumbuka.

It is on the outskirts of the town of Kasungu (population around 60,000); it is 10km (a 15-minute drive) north of the town centre. It is approximately 130km from the capital city, Lilongwe, from which it can be reached by a sedan following the M1 motorway. Masitala is directly next to the motorway.

Masitala is located on a highland; its elevation is about 1000m. The area has fertile red soil, which the agricultural village is dependent on. While the village lacks access to electricity and only has basic amenities, there are schools, a district hospital, petrol stations, police stations, banks, supermarkets, guest houses and churches in Kasungu.

The village of Masitala has become quite well-known because of William Kamkwamba, who built windmills in the village to provide electricity. His story is documented in the book The Boy Who Harnessed The Wind.
