= Maker Faire =

Convention of DIY enthusiasts

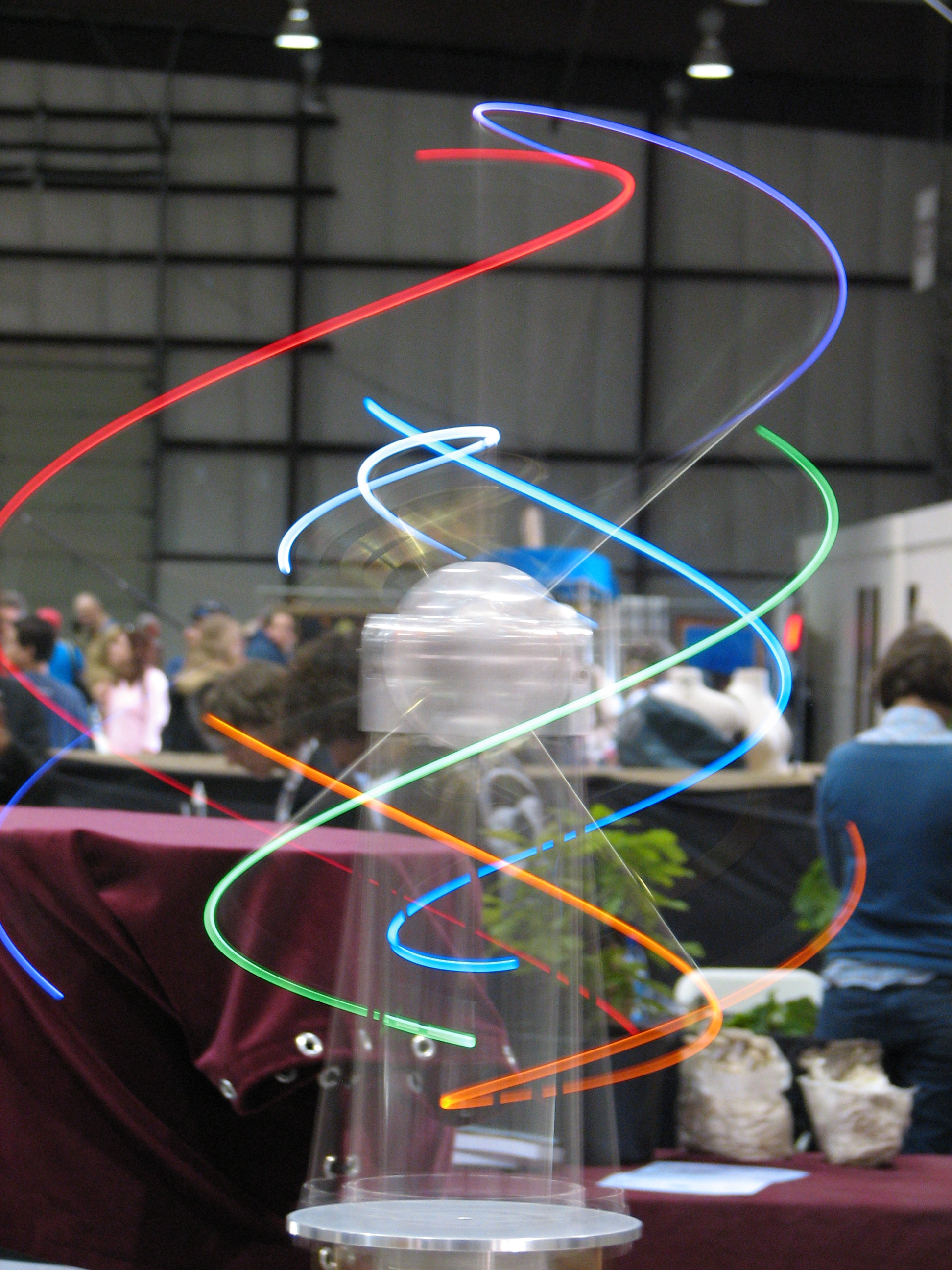
- ORBIT 2 Kinetic Sculpture by Carl Pisaturo shown at 2008 Maker Faire
- Locations: San Mateo, California; Dearborn, Michigan; Queens, New York
- Years active: Since 2006
- Website: makerfaire.com

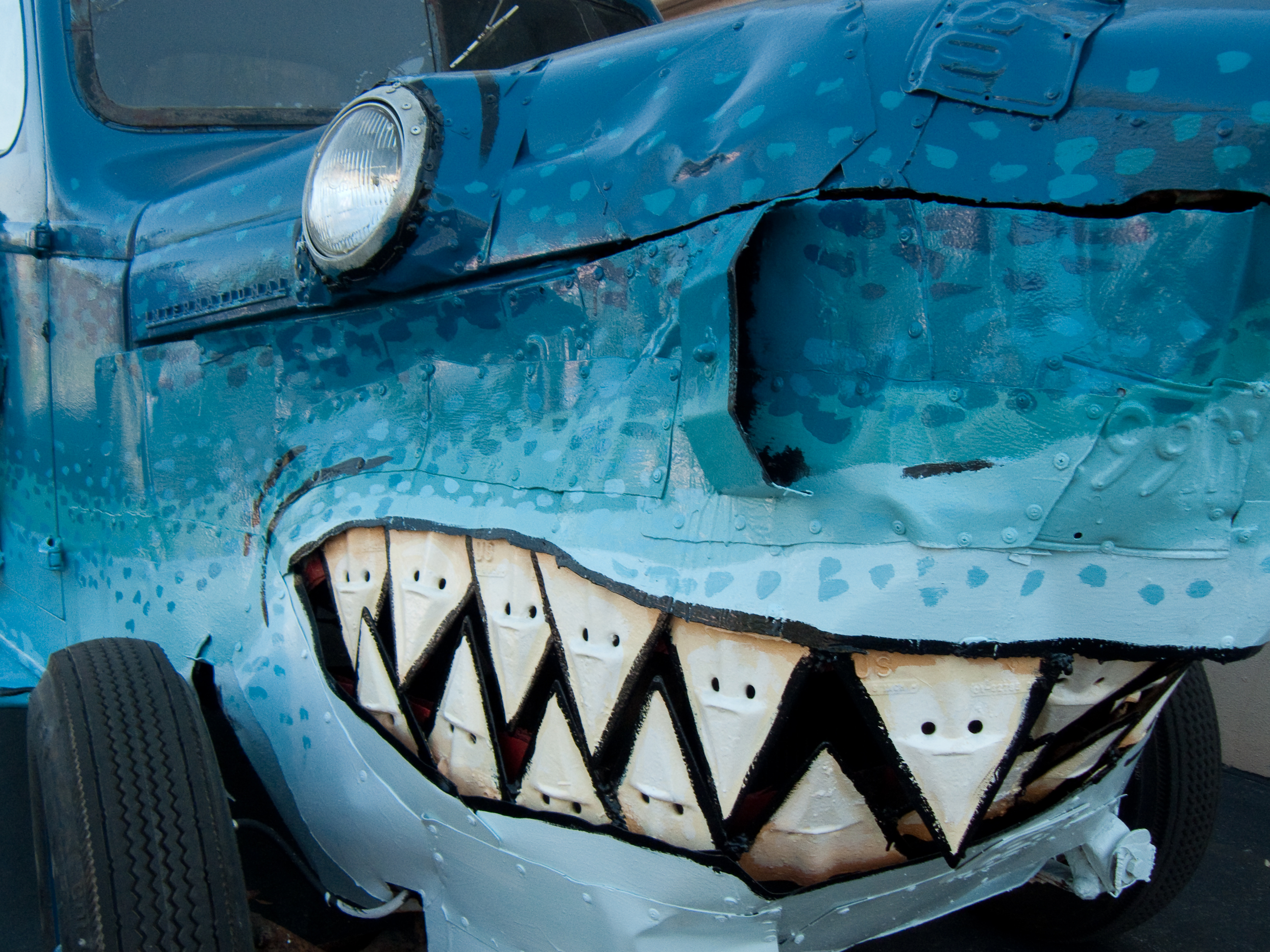
Sharkmobile at Bay Area Maker Faire 2009

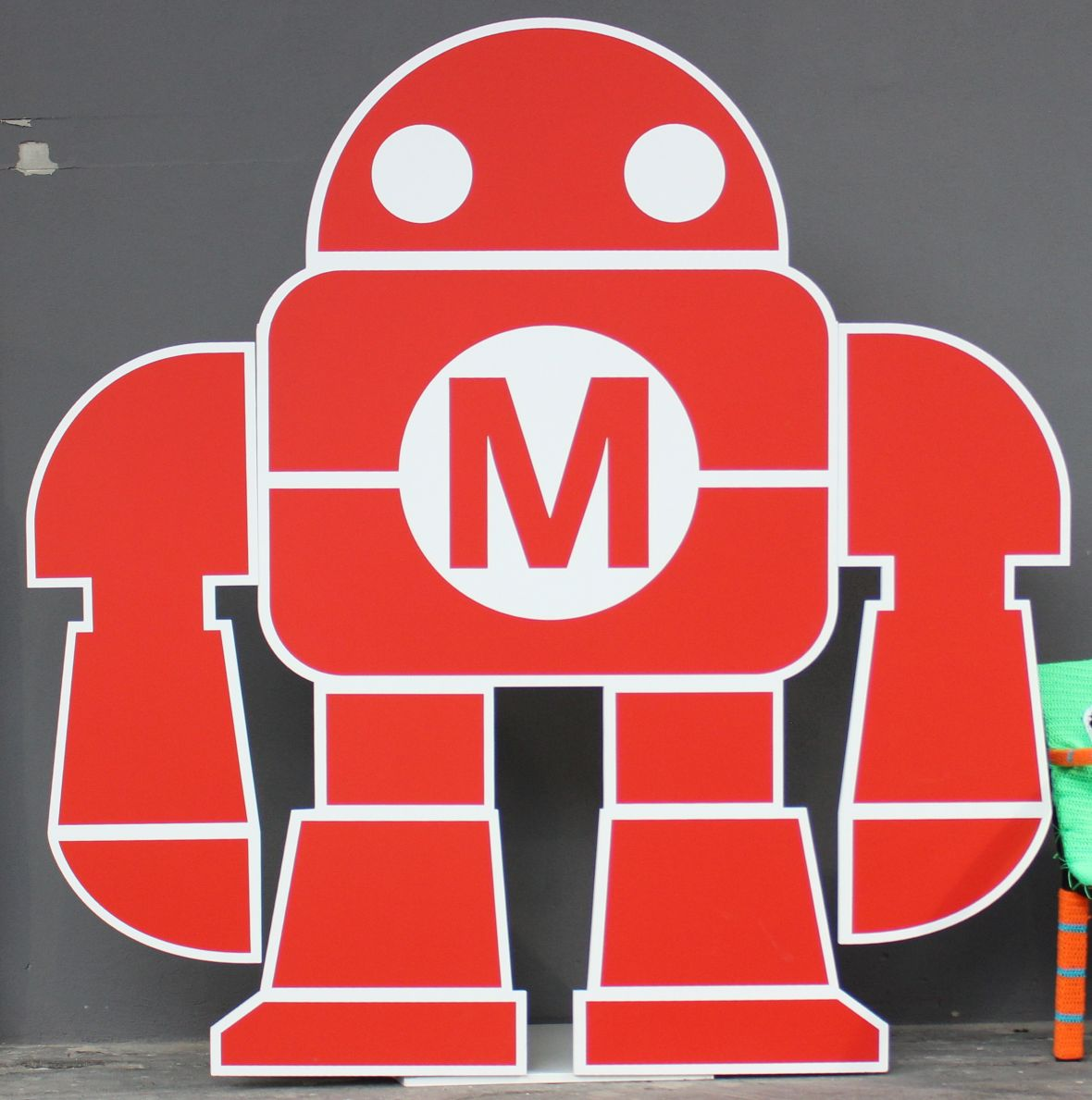
Maker Faire Mascot Makey

Maker Faire is a convention of do it yourself (DIY) enthusiasts established by Make magazine in 2006. Participants come from a wide variety of interests, such as robotics, 3D printing, computers, arts and crafts, and hacker culture. At these Maker Faires all ages come together to display their creations or host "hands on workshops". The Maker Movement directly inspired these Maker Faires, a movement highlighting "innovation and creativity".

The Maker movement stemmed from all the tech innovations coming out in 2005. Dale Dougherty found an "artificial loneliness to creating cool new stuff". Making was an individual process, but it didn't have to stay this way. Dougherty wanted to merge the display aspect of a museum and the interactive nature of talking to the creator. Dougherty's vision for a cohesive community, was brought to life after multiple successful Maker Faires.

== History ==
In 2005, Dale Dougherty founded the magazine Make: as a quarterly publication with Tim O’Reilly. The first Make: magazine was published in 2005 and the first Maker Faire took place in 2006 in San Mateo. Over the next 13 years, this inaugural maker faire expanded to more than 200 licensed Maker Faires in more than 40 countries.

Dale Dougherty convened the first Maker Faire in 2006 in San Mateo, California, drawing a crowd of 20,000.

Maker Media Inc. went out of business in June 2019, and Dale Dougherty rebranded as Make Community.

== Maker Faires in the US ==
=== Flagship Maker Faires ===
The Flagship Maker Faire (Bay Area) was held in San Mateo, California and a second is in New York City.

The last Bay Area Maker Faire was held in 2019. The Maker Faire Bay Area was not held in 2020. This was due to the potential impact of coronavirus as well as the 2019 transition of Maker Media to Make: Community.

A revived Bay Area Maker Faire started in October 2023 at the Mare Island Naval Shipyard in Vallejo, California.

The New York Maker Faire is also known as the "World Maker Faire". The New York City Faire was cancelled in 2019 due to financial difficulties. The most recent New York City Faire was held in Coney Island in 2023.

=== Past US events ===
==== 2008 ====
Maker Faire 2008 was held on May 3–4, 2008, at the San Mateo County Event Center. Highlights of the Faire included a human-sized Mouse Trap board game, kinetic squid sculpture, 55' wingspan kinetic steel butterfly, bicycle-powered music stage, a solar-powered chariot pulled by an Arnold Schwarzenegger robot, and over 500 other booths from different makers. There were approximately 65,000 people in attendance. Featured guests included Adam Savage, Stephanie Pearl-McPhee, Lee David Zlotoff, Tony Baxter and Eepybird.

An additional 2008 Maker Faire was held on October 18–19, 2008, in Austin, Texas.

==== 2009–2011 ====
In the US, the 2009 Maker Faire Rhode Island was scheduled for September 6–19. The first Maker Faire North Carolina was held on April 25, 2010, in Durham, North Carolina. It moved to Raleigh, North Carolina for 2011.

==== 2014 White House Maker Faire ====
On June 18, 2014, President Obama hosted the first-ever (and only thus far) White House Maker Faire. At this inaugural White House Maker Faire, former President Obama admired the 30-plus “inspiring and creative inventions”. This maker movement was created by more than 100 “students, entrepreneurs, engineers, and researchers from 25 states” who focus on “making stuff”.

==== 2020 ====
Maker Faire XV was held online.

==== 2021 Capitol Hill Maker Faire ====
On September 20, 2021, Capitol Hill hosted its annual Maker Faire, celebrating the maker movement. Supported by the Institute of Library and Museum Services (IMLS), museums and libraries promote makerspaces and programs to foster design thinking and project-based learning. The IMLS also funds research and practices to strengthen education.

=== Government Sponsorship ===
The White House Maker Faire in 2014 marked a significant time of federal recognition for the Maker movement. The Obama administration supported, advancing STEM education and expanding entrepreneurship opportunities through this Maker Faire. Following the event the Obama administration launched the "Nation of Makers" initiative, which included a $2.5 million competition to encourage the expansion of makerspaces. Government also supported the growth of the Next Generation Science Standards (NGSS).

== Worldwide Maker Faires ==
Maker Faires are also held in Europe, Asia, South America and Africa.

Ghana

Afrigadget, a website dedicated to African Ingenuity, was created by Erik Hersman in 2006 just a few months after Make Magazine and the first Maker Faire Africa took place in Ghana in 2009.

United Kingdom

The first Maker Faire in the United Kingdom took place on March 14–15, 2009, in Newcastle upon Tyne, as a joint venture with the Newcastle ScienceFest.

Canada

In 2010, Canada had their first Mini Maker Faire in Ottawa, Ontario on November 6–7.

China

Maker Faire has spread worldwide, and the first Maker Faire in Hong Kong was held in 2014. The next year it grew significantly and was organized by The Hong Kong Polytechnic University, led by Dr. Clifford Choy from the university's School of Design in November 2015 as well as in April 2017.

Egypt

In 2015, the US Embassy in Cairo and Fab Lab Egypt started organizing Maker Faire Cairo that received thousands of visitors.

== Mini Maker Faires ==
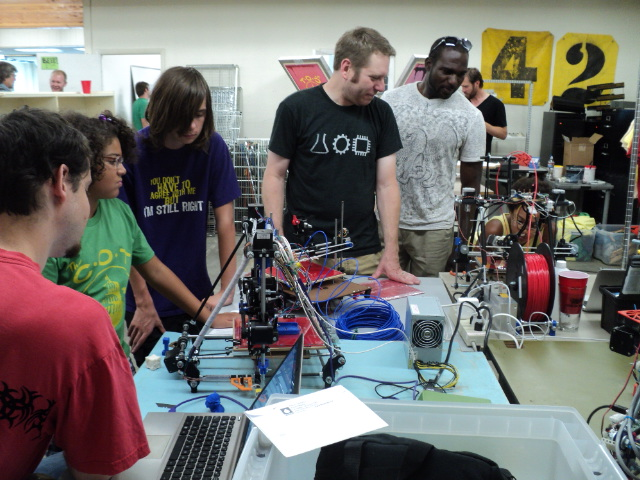
Children participating at a Maker Meetup in Garden City, Idaho

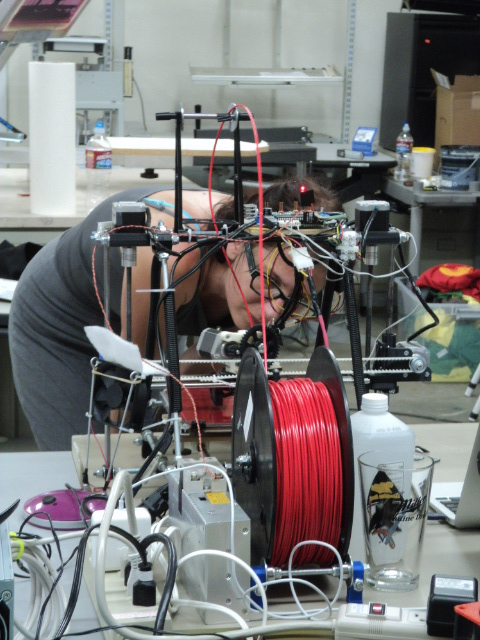
An organizer examines a project

Make Magazine assists independent event organizers in producing small-scale Maker Faire events in local communities.

In 2011, Mini Maker Faires were held in Canada (Toronto, Vancouver), the United Kingdom (Brighton) and a number of cities in the USA: Pittsburgh, Pennsylvania; Phoenix, Arizona; Portland, Oregon; Bend, Oregon; Oakland, California; Fort Wayne, Indiana; Fishers, Indiana; Providence, Rhode Island; Atlanta, Georgia; Kansas City, Missouri; Raleigh, North Carolina; Poulsbo, Washington, Ann Arbor, Michigan; Linthicum, Maryland; Westport, Connecticut; Louisville, Kentucky; and Urbana, Illinois.

== School Maker Faires ==
Schools can also host Maker Faires. Elementary schools use Maker Faires as a means of experiential learning, showcasing student work. These events are interactive, allowing attendees, students and teachers to make. The growing Maker Movement in education has inspired a vision for the Next Generation Science Standards (NGSS). The NGSS is a K-12 content standards that encourages interactive learning through the practices of science and engineering.

== See also ==
- Makezine
- Maker culture
- Power Racing Series
