= Lily Banda =

Actor, Singer, songwriter, dancer, poet

- Occupations: actress, singer, songwriter, dancer, poet
- Years active: 2010-present
- Notable work: The Boy Who Harnessed the Wind

Lily Banda is an actor, singer, songwriter, dancer and poet.

== Biography ==
In 2020 she appeared on the Africa 35:35 list of The 35 most influential young African personalities. In 2019, Banda appeared in The Boy Who Harnessed the Wind, based on the memoir by William Kamkwamba. She played Annie Kamkwamba. She also starred as Aicha Konate in the second season of the TV series Deep State in 2019. Her character is a Malian interpreter who is ambushed and supposedly killed.

== Filmography ==
- 2019: The Boy Who Harnessed the Wind as Annie Kamkwamba
- 2019: Deep State (TV series) as Aicha Konate
- 2021: Wheel of Time (TV series) as Mulaen
- 2023: Supa Team 4 (TV Series) as Leopard
- 2024: The Hunted (Drama) as Wael
