= Deep State (TV series) =

British television espionage thriller series

- Genre: Drama; Thriller
- Created by: Simon Maxwell; Matthew Parkhill
- Directed by: Robert Connolly; Matthew Parkhill
- Starring: Mark Strong; Walton Goggins; Joe Dempsie; Karima Adebibe; Anastasia Griffith; Alistair Petrie; Lyne Renée; Victoria Hamilton; Rachel Shelley
- Music by: Harry Escott
- Country of origin: United Kingdom
- Original language: English
- No. of series: 2
- No. of episodes: 16

Production
- Executive producers: Sara Johnson; Matthew Parkhill; Hilary Bevan Jones; Alan Greenspan; Helen Flint; Jeff Ford
- Producer: Khadija Alami
- Cinematography: David Higgs; Nic Lawson
- Running time: 50 minutes
- Production companies: Endor Productions; Mookville; K Films; 6 Degree Media; Little Island Productions

Original release
- Network: Fox
- Release: 5 April 2018 – 27 June 2019

Deep State is a British espionage thriller television series, written and created by Matthew Parkhill and Simon Maxwell, first broadcast in the United Kingdom on Fox on 5 April 2018. The first eight-part series, which began filming in May 2017, stars Mark Strong as Max Easton, a former field agent for MI6 who is recruited back into the field. The series co-starred Walton Goggins, Joe Dempsie, Karima Adebibe, Lyne Renée, Anastasia Griffith and Alistair Petrie.

The series is produced by Endor Productions for the Fox Networks Group of Europe and Africa. As well as co-creating the series, Parkhill also serves as showrunner, executive producer and director of four of the eight episodes. The series premiered in the United States on 17 June 2018 on Epix.

A second series was commissioned on 5 April 2018. The second series premiered on 28 April 2019 in the United States, starring Walton Goggins as an ex-CIA operative drawn into a political crisis in Mali.

== Cast ==
- Mark Strong as Max Easton; former Field Agent, MI6. (Series 1)
- Walton Goggins as Nathan Miller; an ex-CIA operative. (Series 2)
- Joe Dempsie as Harry Clarke; Field Agent, MI6. Max Easton's son.
- Karima Adebibe as Leyla Toumi; Field Agent, MI6.
- Anastasia Griffith as Amanda Jones; CIA.
- Alistair Petrie as George White; Head of Section, MI6.
- Lyne Renee as Anna Easton; Max's wife. (Series 1)
- Victoria Hamilton as Meaghan Sullivan; Senator working on the US Intelligence Committee. (Series 2)
- Rachel Shelley as Elliot Taylor; deputy Head of Section, MI6.

=== Supporting ===
==== Series 1 (2018) ====
- Adrien Jolivet as Noah; Anna Easton's brother.
- Cara Bossom as Chloë Easton; Max and Anna's elder daughter.
- Indica Watson as Lola Easton; Max and Anna's younger daughter.
- Alexandre Willaume as Laurence
- Mark Holden as John Lynn; CIA handler and Amanda Jones' boss.
- William Hope as Senator Hawes
- Bijan Daneshmand as Ali Ardavan
- Corey Johnson as Burrell
- Eric Kofi-Abrefa as Jackson
- Donald Sage Mackay as Martin Collins
- Kingsley Ben-Adir as Khalid Walker; Intelligence, MI6.
- Zubin Varla as Alexander Said; Senior Field Agent, MI6.
- Amelia Bullmore as Olivia Clarke; journalist. Harry's mother and Max's ex-wife.
- Khalid Laith as Anthony Kahani
- Mel Raido as Ryan Cooper; Field Agent, MI6.

==== Series 2 (2019) ====
- Lily Banda as Aïcha Konaté; interpreter.
- Zainab Jah as Aminata Sissoko; Malian Minister for Anti-Corruption.
- Hakeem Kae-Kazim as Joseph Damba; Malian Minister for Transport.
- David Jonsson as Isaac Turner; Field Agent, MI6.
- Alexander Siddig as Issouf Al Moctar
- Adam James as Adam McKay
- Sean Cameron Michael as Colonel John Russell.
- Kae Alexander as Jessica Tamura; assistant to Meaghan Sullivan.
- Mark Holden as John Lynn, former CIA handler.
- Pip Torrens as William Kingsley
- Owen Teale as Hal Weaver
- Mitchell Mullen as Senator Todd Wilson
- Ruth Gemmell as Gina Graham; partner of Meaghan Sullivan.
- Shelley Conn as Nicole Miller
- Darron Meyer as Edward Andrews

== Episodes ==
Series	Episodes	Originally released	
Series	Episodes	First released	Last released
1	8	5 April 2018	24 May 2018
2	8	9 May 2019	27 June 2019

=== Series 1 (2018) ===
No. overall	No. in series	Title	Directed by	Written by	Original release date	U.K. viewers (millions)
1	1	"Old Habits"	Robert Connolly	Matthew Parkhill	5 April 2018	0.68
2	2	"A Kind of Warfare"	Robert Connolly	Simon Maxwell	12 April 2018	0.40
3	3	"The Man Came Around"	Robert Connolly	Simon Maxwell	19 April 2018	0.37
4	4	"Reunion"	Robert Connolly	Stephen Thompson	26 April 2018	0.38
5	5	"Merger"	Matthew Parkhill	Matthew Parkhill	3 May 2018	0.32
6	6	"Stories"	Matthew Parkhill	Stephen Thompson	10 May 2018	0.26
7	7	"White Noise"	Matthew Parkhill	Simon Maxwell	17 May 2018	0.24
8	8	"Blood in the Sand"	Matthew Parkhill	Matthew Parkhill	24 May 2018	0.24

=== Series 2 (2019) ===
No. overall	No. in series	Title	Directed by	Written by	Original release date	U.K viewers (millions)
9	1	"Cicero"	Matthew Parkhill	Matthew Parkhill	9 May 2019	N/A
In Mali, a vehicle carrying three members of the US Special Forces and a translator is ambushed; and all aboard are apparently killed. But it soon transpires that translator Aïcha Konaté (Lily Banda) has survived the attack when she reaches out to old friend Leyla for help. Having lost contact with Harry since the events of the first series, Leyla travels out to Mali, where Harry is now living, with the hope of enlisting his help to find Aïcha. Leyla soon comes to realise that she is not the only one looking for Aïcha. As the story rewinds by two years, Harry, George, Leyla, Nathan (Walton Goggins) and their colleague Isaac (David Jonsson) enlist Aïcha's help while in Mali on a security mission, but find themselves at the mercy of a ruthless terrorist, Issouf Al Moctar (Alexander Siddig).
10	2	"Hard Sun"	Matthew Parkhill	Matthew Parkhill	16 May 2019	N/A
Nathan, along with colleague Amanda Jones, flies out to Mali on the orders of William Kingsley (Pip Torrens) to contain an increasingly unstable situation. Nathan meets with minister for transport Joseph Damba (Hakeem Kae-Kazim), who claims to have a lead on Aïcha's whereabouts. Back in the United States, Senator Meaghan Sullivan (Victoria Hamilton) continues to look into the Mali operation, but finds herself being met with silence at every turn. Harry suspects that former colleague Adam McKay (Adam James) may have sold him and Leyla out to the Americans, and sets about confronting him.
11	3	"Declaration of Independence"	Joss Agnew	Simon Maxwell	23 May 2019	N/A
Harry and Leyla learn from Aïcha that the ambush was an attempt to prevent her from revealing sensitive information involving an arms smuggling operation occurring from within the Malian government. With the help of Anti-Corruption Minister Aminata Sissoko (Zainab Jah), Harry and Leyla try to secure the safe return of Aïcha's brother and sister. Rewinding two years ago, George and the section continue to find themselves at the mercy of Al Moctar, but when the British government refuse to pay the ransom request, Al Moctar loses his cool and executes Isaac. Nathan, in a desperate attempt to prevent Damba revealing potentially damaging information, organises for the construction of a car bomb, cleverly disguised as a Libyan execution device.
12	4	"Tomorrow's Victory"	Joss Agnew	Joshua St Johnston	30 May 2019	N/A
True to her word, Aminata helps reunite Aïcha with her siblings, but as she does, Harry and Leyla are arrested on murder charges. Nathan revels in their arrest, until he realises that he needs their help to frame the one person that up this point, has been their closest ally. Amanda (Anastasia Griffith) learns from Kingsley that she must remain in Mali when Nathan is deployed back to the US. Meaghan is forced out of her role on the intelligence committee, and vows to seek the truth about what really happened in Mali two years ago. Rewinding two years, Nathan reveals to George that he has an underground contact who can help them escape from Al Moctar's clutches.
13	5	"Surrender"	Joss Agnew	Chris Dunlop	6 June 2019	N/A
Harry, Aicha and Leyla are chased out of Bamako. They reach Al Moctar's camp, where Aicha is taken away to be hanged for a previous crime. During the search for the three, Amanda Jones shows Collins confession video to Miller, who gets angry over the revelation. Back in Washington Miller decides to sidestep Kingsley and goes straight to Hal Weaver, the man behind Deep State. Miller gets help from Weaver to remove the problems with the damaging video. In return Miller sets up a new smuggling route for Al Moctar. On the home front Miller tries to save his marriage, that is long time suffering due to his work.
14	6	"The New Normal"	Joss Agnew	Steve Thompson & Matthew Parkhill	13 June 2019	N/A
Whilst Aicha is dragged to the scaffold, Harry argues her defence. He manages to convince Al Moctar to hold off and first investigate if his army has been cut off from weapon supplies from Deep State. An empty weapon drop confirms Harry's notion. Al Moctar has played out his role and Deep State has ditched him and his army, since US troops are now setting up army bases in Mali. Retreating back into the country Al Moctar releases the trio and gives them the name and whereabouts of his weapons supplier. The trio drives off to find the supplier.
15	7	"Changes Upon Changes"	Matthew Parkhill	Matthew Parkhill & Simon Maxwell	20 June 2019	N/A
As Harry, Leyla and Aicha dig deeper into the illegal weapons deal, they are caught by American soldiers during their search for evidence. Leyla and Aicha manage to get away and seek help from Aminata Sissoko. Aicha is reunited with her siblings. Harry is arrested and handed over to the CIA. Miller uses the opportunity to set the rest of the plan in motion, as instructed by Hal Weaver.
16	8	"A Dead Man’s Machine"	Matthew Parkhill	Matthew Parkhill	27 June 2019	N/A
Harry is being flown to a CIA Black Site in US. He refuses to talk and asks for Amanda Jones. Meanwhile Senator Meaghan Sullivan keeps digging into the links between Kingsley, Seracom and the people involved in the illegal weapons smuggling, including Miller. Her investigation comes at a personal price. Finally the connection to Deep State is revealed, but Miller has disappeared before testifying to the Senate Intelligence Committee. Amanda Jones is being sacrificed by Deep State and must pay a high price for her freedom. In turn she helps getting Harry out of the Black Site. Leyla arrives in the US and is reunited with Harry. In Mali Aminata Sissiko is sworn in as the new prime minister of Mali with Aicha as her assistant. The new government enters into a mining deal with an Australian enterprise. Will Deep State survive and continue its war profiteering?
