= Yellow Fever (2012 film) =

2012 short animated documentary film by Ng'endo Mukii

Yellow Fever is a 2012 Kenyan short animated documentary film directed by Ng'endo Mukii. The film examines the influence of globalization and Western media on African women’s perceptions of beauty, particularly in relation to skin lightening and hair practices. It was produced between London and Nairobi and was originally created as Mukii’s thesis project for her Master of Arts in Animation at the Royal College of Art.

== Plot ==
The film explores beauty standards and colorism among African women, focusing on how globalized, Eurocentric ideals shape self-image. Combining animation, interviews, and personal narrative, Mukii draws on the experiences of women in her own family across three generations. The film addresses themes of representation, media influence, and the internalization of racialized beauty norms.

== Production ==
Yellow Fever was produced between London and Nairobi, reflecting Mukii’s transnational experience. The project initially involved interviews with women in public spaces such as markets and hair salons, but later shifted toward a more personal focus on Mukii’s family. This change shaped the film’s intimate narrative approach.

== Director ==
Ng'endo Mukii is a Kenyan visual artist, animator, and filmmaker. She studied illustration at the Rhode Island School of Design and later completed a master's degree in animation at the Royal College of Art, where Yellow Fever was produced as her thesis film.

== Reception and awards ==
Yellow Fever received critical acclaim for its hybrid use of animation and documentary storytelling, as well as its exploration of colorism and identity.

The film’s awards include:

- Silver Hugo for Best Animated Short at the Chicago International Film Festival (2013).
- Best Student Film at the Under_Exposed Film Festival (2013).
- Best Animation at the This Is England Film Festival (2013).
