= Bryan Mealer =

American journalist and author

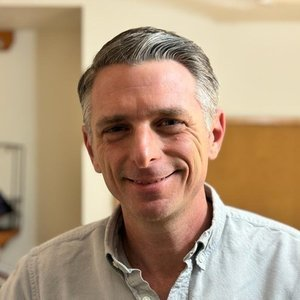
- Mealer in 2024
- Born: January 23, 1975 (age 51); Odessa, Texas
- Education: University of Texas at Austin
- Occupations: Journalist and Writer

Bryan Mealer (born 1974) is an American journalist and author. He is the author of four books: All Things Must Fight to Live about his experiences covering war in the Congo, The Boy Who Harnessed the Wind (with inventor William Kamkwamba), Muck City about high school football in a rural African American communities in Florida, and The Kings of Big Spring about his family history in Texas. He has written for publications including The Guardian and Texas Monthly. The 2019 film The Boy Who Harnessed the Wind was adapted from the book.

== Early life and education ==
Mealer was born in Odessa, Texas and grew up in West Texas and San Antonio. He received a degree in journalism from the University of Texas at Austin.

== Writing ==
Kirkus Reviews described his book on his experiences covering the war in Congo as containing "Gutsy, richly descriptive recollections effectively conjure grisly events in a troubled nation."

The New York Times reviewed his book Muck City about the Glades Central High School Raiders of Belle Glade, Florida and the pursuit of football success. The Palm Beach Post called the book a lesson-filled trip into the past against a backdrop of AIDs, murder, drug use, and tragedy. Kirkus Reviews described it as a "stirring tale of sports as a means of escape from dire circumstances" in Florida's cane sugar producing region. Publishers Weekly noted "it chronicles the evolution of high school football in Belle Glade, Fla.—among the poorest communities in the U.S. and defined by the fertile black silt that helped build a sugarcane-farming empire." Mealer was interviewed about the book on NPR in 2012.

== Books ==
- All Things Must Fight to Live: Stories of War and Deliverance in Congo (2008)
- The Boy Who Harnessed the Wind: Creating Currents of Electricity and Hope (2009) co-authored with William Kamkwamba, William Morrow & Company ISBN 978-0-06-173032-0
- Muck City: Winning and Losing in Football’s Forgotten Town (2012) Crown Archetype ISBN 978-0-307-88862-4
- The Kings of Big Spring: God, Oil, and One Family’s Search for the American Dream (2018) Flatiron ISBN 978-1-250-05891-1
