= RuBot II =

Rubik's Cube solving robot

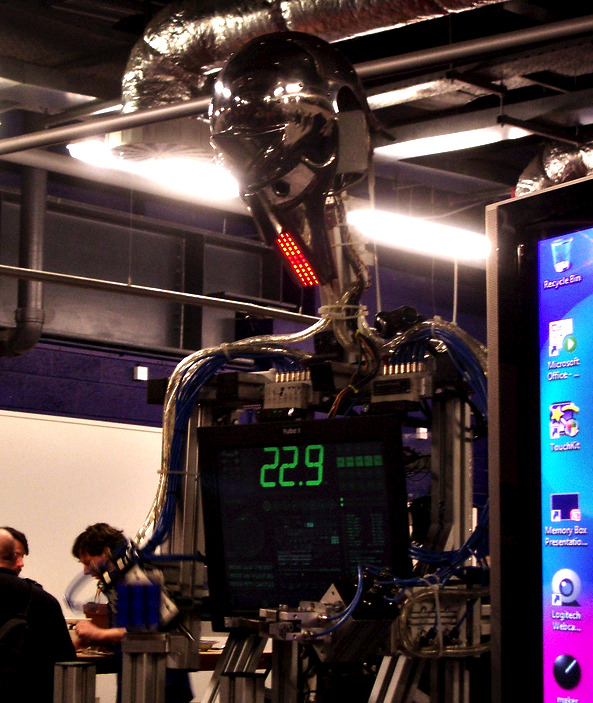
RuBot II at Maker Faire

RuBot II is a Rubik's Cube solving robot developed by Irish roboticist and inventor Pete Redmond. RuBot II is also known as RuBot II, the Cubinator. RuBot II became the world's fastest Rubik's Cube-solving robot, and appeared as such in the Guinness Book of World Records. There are other Rubik's Cube robots too.

Pete Redmond has stated that although the robot was built for entertainment, the science behind it can be practically useful. The technology that helps the RuBot to see can also be used in other robots in places where it might not be safe to send people, like disaster zones, where a robot can be sent in to see and make independent decisions.

There are numerous YouTube videos of RuBot working on Rubik's Cubes, and its makers have given him some 'human' qualities, such as conversation to make these more entertaining.

RuBot II, the Cubinator, won a Guinness World Record for solving the Rubik’s Cube in the fastest time for a robot.

== Working ==
RuBot II, the Cubinator can easily pick up and solve the Rubik's Cube puzzle game in an interactive way. In a typical run, the robot is given a Rubik's Cube scrambled by a human. It then takes the cube and hoists it up to eye camera level, where it scans and records the configurations on all faces of the cube. The input configurations read by RuBot's cameras are run through Kociemba’s 2 phase algorithm to find a solution with less than 20 moves, the computation normally taking less than one second, and then works with it using its pneumatic arms. It can solve any Rubik's Cube in less than 50 seconds, and has managed it in a record time of 21 seconds. RuBot II has been nicknamed "The Cubinator" and "RuBot II, the Cubinator".

== Creator ==
Pete Redmond is from Dublin, Ireland. He has worked as an avionics engineer for the Irish Air Corps. Pete has degrees in Computer Science, a master's degree in Engineering, and a Ph.D. from Trinity College. His other notable works include Diotoir and Nemesis from the BBC TV show Robot Wars, and RoboRiots.ie, and a combustion engine powered sprinting robot called Ulysses that set a world record on a BBC TV show called Technogames.
