= Hangry =

Hangry is a portmanteau of hungry and angry.

Hangry may also refer to:

- Hangry, one half of the Japanese pop rock duo Hangry & Angry
- Hangry, a proposed answer to the -gry puzzle
- Hangry, a video game developed by Game Pill
