= The Boy Who Harnessed the Wind =

2019 biographical drama film by Chiwetel Ejiofor

- Film poster
- Directed by: Chiwetel Ejiofor
- Screenplay by: Chiwetel Ejiofor
- Based on: The Boy Who Harnessed the Wind by William Kamkwamba; Bryan Mealer
- Produced by: Andrea Calderwood; Gail Egan
- Starring: Maxwell Simba; Chiwetel Ejiofor; Lily Banda
- Cinematography: Dick Pope
- Edited by: Valerio Bonelli
- Music by: Antônio Pinto
- Production companies: Netflix; BBC Films; Participant Media; British Film Institute; Potboiler Productions
- Distributed by: Netflix
- Release date: 25 January 2019 (Sundance)
- Running time: 113 minutes
- Countries: United Kingdom; Malawi
- Languages: English; Chichewa

The Boy Who Harnessed the Wind is a 2019 drama film written, directed by and starring Chiwetel Ejiofor in his feature directorial debut. The film is based on the memoir of the same name by William Kamkwamba and Bryan Mealer. It was screened in the Premieres section at the 2019 Sundance Film Festival and began streaming in most territories on Netflix on 1 March 2019. It was selected as the British entry for the Best International Feature Film at the 92nd Academy Awards, but it was not nominated. It received widely positive reviews with praise going to Ejiofor's direction and the acting.

The film has been adapted into a stage musical of the same name, by the Royal Shakespeare Company and made its debut in Stratford-upon-Avon in February 2026 before transferring to London's West End for a 12-week season at @SohoPlace from 25 April to 18 July 2026.

== Plot ==
Born in Kasungu, Malawi, William Kamkwamba is a young schoolboy who comes from a family of farmers who live in the nearby village of Wimbe. William has a talent for fixing radios for his friends and neighbours and spends his free time looking through the local junkyard for salvageable electronic components. Although he is soon banned from attending school due to his parents' inability to pay his tuition fees, William blackmails his science teacher, Mr. Kachigunda (who is in a secret relationship with William's sister) into letting him continue attending his class and have access to the school's library where he learns about electrical engineering and energy production.

By the mid-2000s, the family's crops fail due to drought and the resulting famine devastates Wimbe, leading to riots over government rationing. The economic effects of the September 11 attacks further devastate the country. William's family is also robbed of their already meager grain stores. People soon begin abandoning the village, and William's sister elopes with Mr. Kachigunda in order to leave her family "one less mouth to feed", but not before leaving a component of Kachigunda's bicycle that William requested of her.

Seeking to save his village from the drought, William devises a plan to build a windmill to power the town's broken water pump. His small prototype works successfully, but to build a larger windmill, William requires his father, Trywell, to give permission to dismantle the family bicycle for parts, which is the only bicycle in the village and the family's last major asset. His father believes the exercise futile and destroys the prototype and forces William to toil in the fields. After William's dog, Khamba, dies of starvation, William's mother, Agnes, intervenes and urges his father to reconsider. William and his father reconcile after William buries Khamba. With the help of his friends, the few remaining members of the village and the component taken from Kachigunda's bicycle, they build a full-size windmill which leads to a successful crop being sown.

== Cast ==
- Maxwell Simba as William Kamkwamba
- Chiwetel Ejiofor as Trywell Kamkwamba
- Felix Lemburo as John Kamkwamba
- Aïssa Maïga as Agnes Kamkwamba
- Lily Banda as Annie Kamkwamba
- Robert Agengo as Jeremiah Kamkwamba
- Joseph Marcell as Chief Wimbeh
- Noma Dumezweni as Edith Sikelo
- Lemogang Tsipa as Mike Kachigunda
- Philbert Falakeza as Gilbert Wimbe
- Melvin Alusa as Justin Mitwar
- Kelvin Maxwell Ngoma as Charity Malamusi
- Kelvin Chimpokoser as Geoffrey
- Khalani Mbugua as Charles Daud
- George Misinde as M.C.

== Release ==
On 14 November 2018, Netflix acquired global distribution rights, excluding Japan, China, and United Kingdom free TV rights. The film had its world premiere at the 2019 Sundance Film Festival on 25 January 2019.

== Reception ==
On review aggregator Rotten Tomatoes the film has an approval rating of 86%, based on 64 reviews, with an average rating of 7.3/10. The website's critical consensus reads, "The Boy Who Harnessed the Wind earns its predictably uplifting arc through strong performances and impressive work from debuting director Chiwetel Ejiofor." On Metacritic, the film has a weighted average score of 68 out of 100, based on 18 critics, indicating "generally favorable reviews".

== See also ==
- List of submissions to the 92nd Academy Awards for Best International Feature Film
- List of British submissions for the Academy Award for Best International Feature Film
