= Maker Faire Africa =

- Formation: 2009
- Founder: Mark Grimes (Felonious Nun); Emeka Okafor; Lars Hasselblad Torres; Erik Hersman; Nii Simmonds
- Type: International Organization
- Purpose: Promotes African innovation, fabrication and locally generated technology solutions

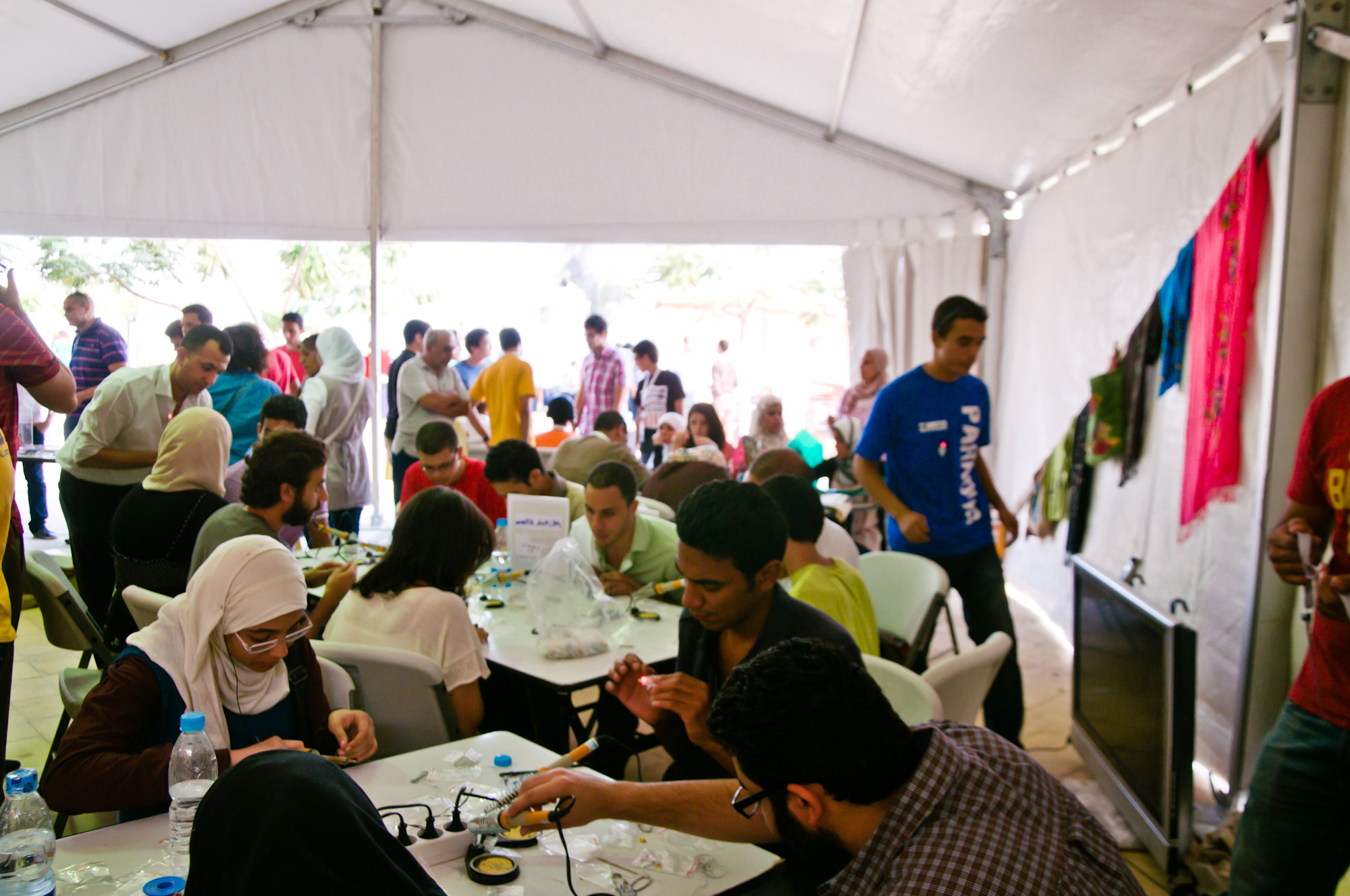
Maker Faire Africa, Cairo, October 2011

Presently curated and organized by Emeka Okafor, Henry Barnor and Jennifer Wolfe, Maker Faire Africa is an international organization co-founded by Mark Grimes (Felonious Nun) Emeka Okafor (TED Africa), Lars Hasselblad Torres (IDEAS Global Challenge), Erik Hersman (Afrigadget) and Nii Simmonds (Nubian Cheetah). Maker Faire Africa aims to engage with on-the-ground breakthrough organizations and individual makers to sharpen focus on locally generated, bottom-up prototypes of technologies that solve immediate challenges to development.

== Overview ==
The aim of a Maker Faire Africa is to create a space on the African continent where Afrigadget-type innovations, inventions and initiatives can be sought, identified, brought to life, supported, amplified and propagated. At the same time, Maker Faire Africa would seek to imbue creative types in science and technology with an appreciation of fabrication and by default manufacturing. The first Maker Faire Africa was in Ghana in 2009. The second phase was held in Nairobi, Kenya in 2010, the third in Cairo in 2011, the fourth in Lagos, the fifth abroad (Istanbul, Milan, New York City) and the sixth in Johannesburg.

== Images ==
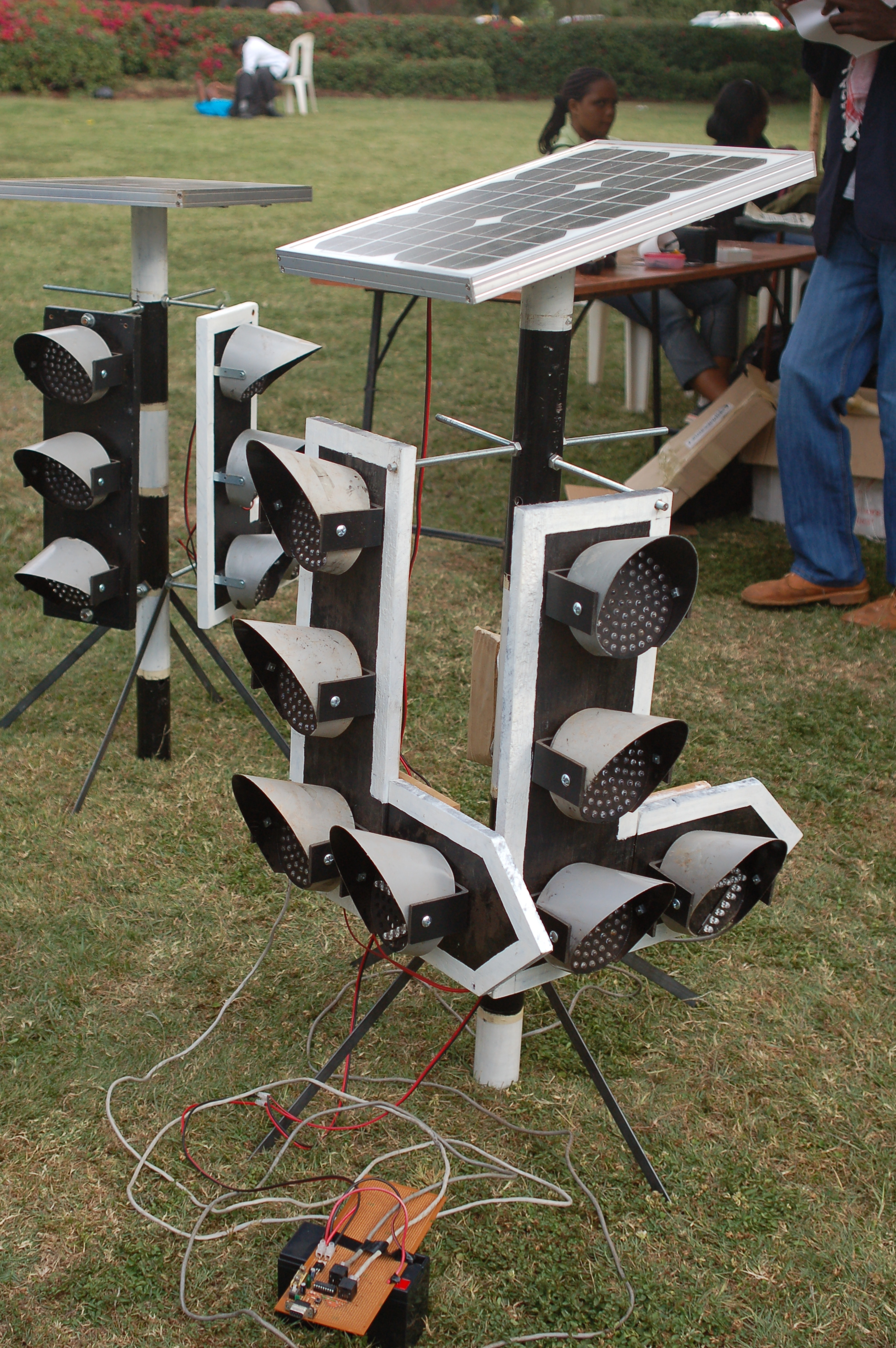
Innovative traffic-light, Nairobi, 2010

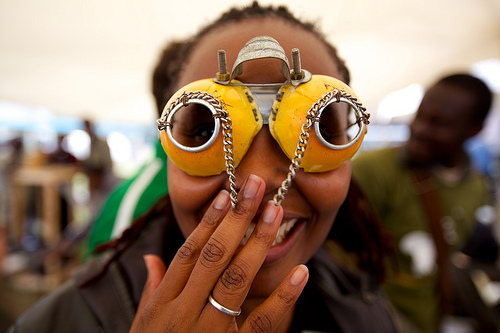
Maker Faire Africa, Nairobi, 2010

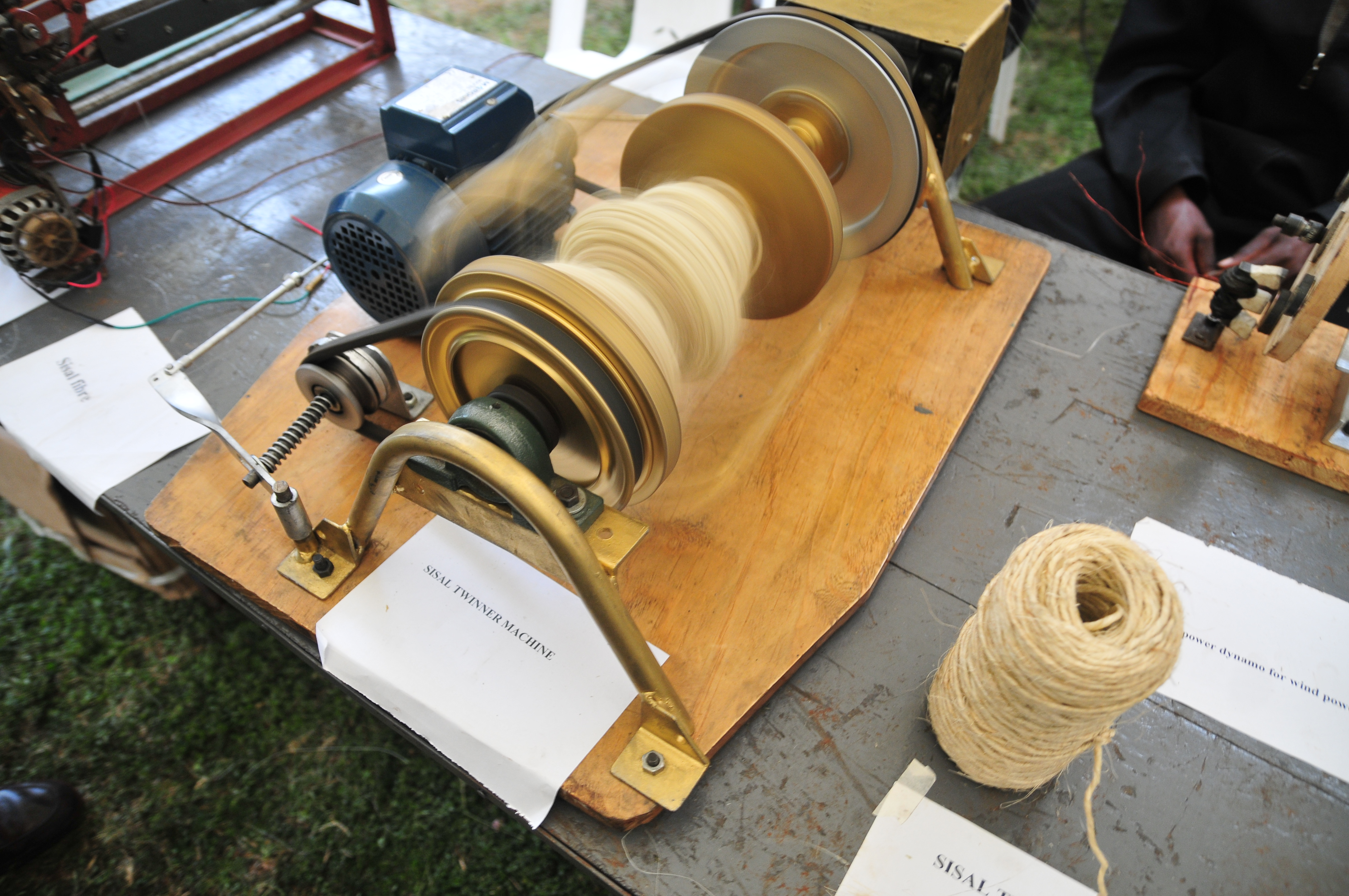
Sisal Twinner Machine, Nairobi, August 2010

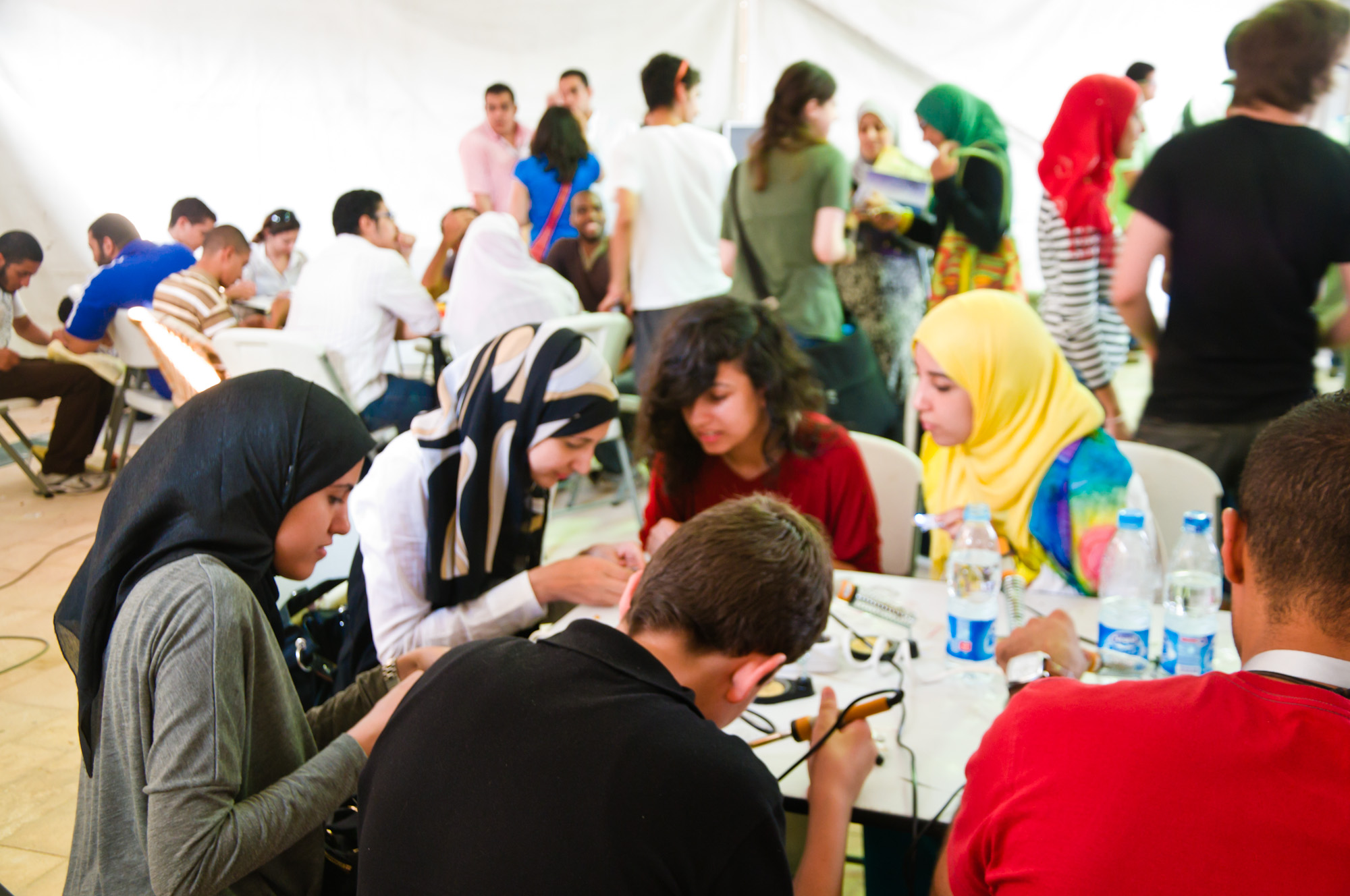
Cairo, October 2011

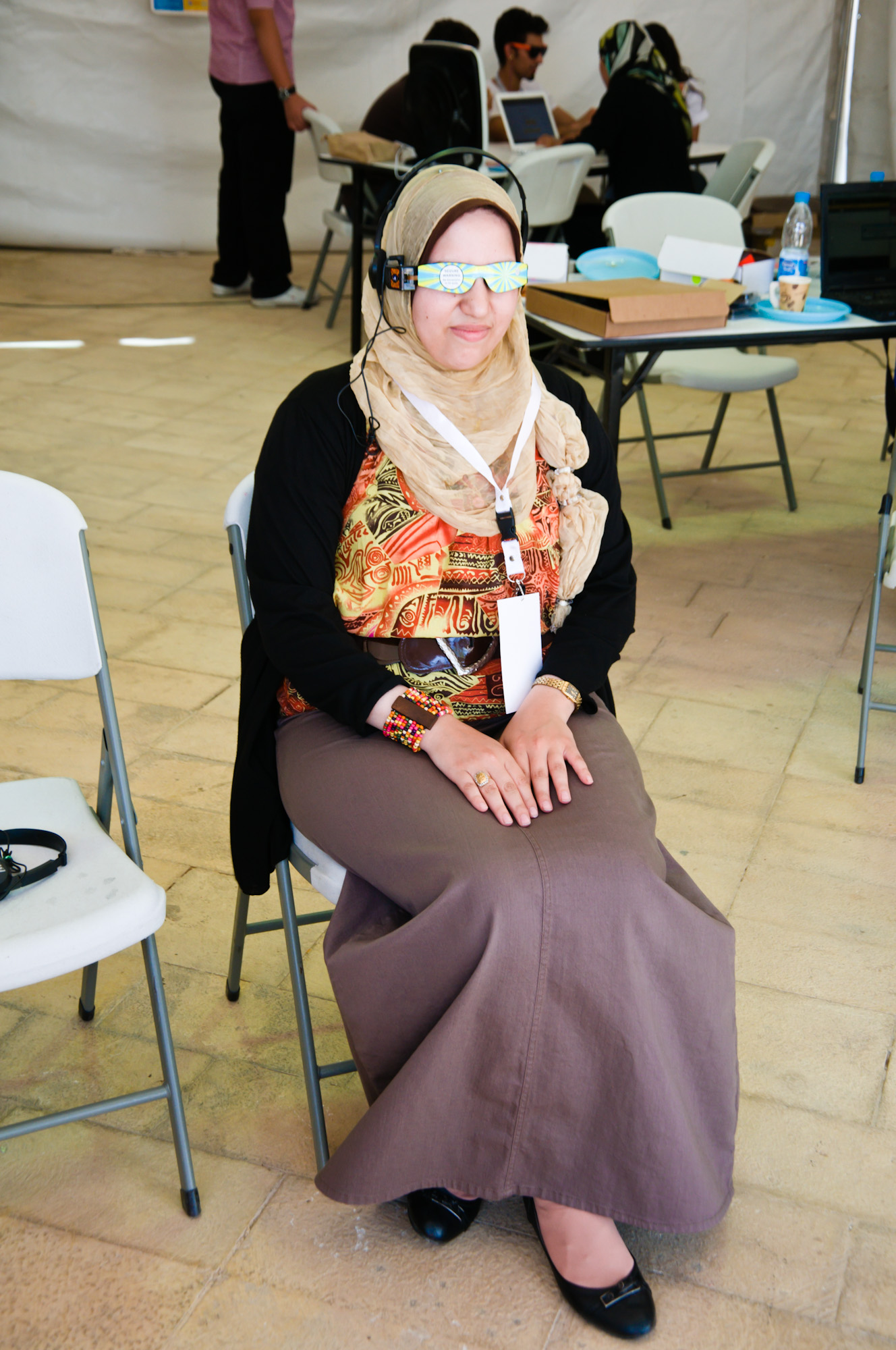
Cairo, 2011

== See also ==
- Creative problem solving
- Theories of technology
- Ecoinnovation
- Information revolution
- Invention
- Knowledge economy
- Open Innovation
