= William Kamkwamba =

Malawian inventor

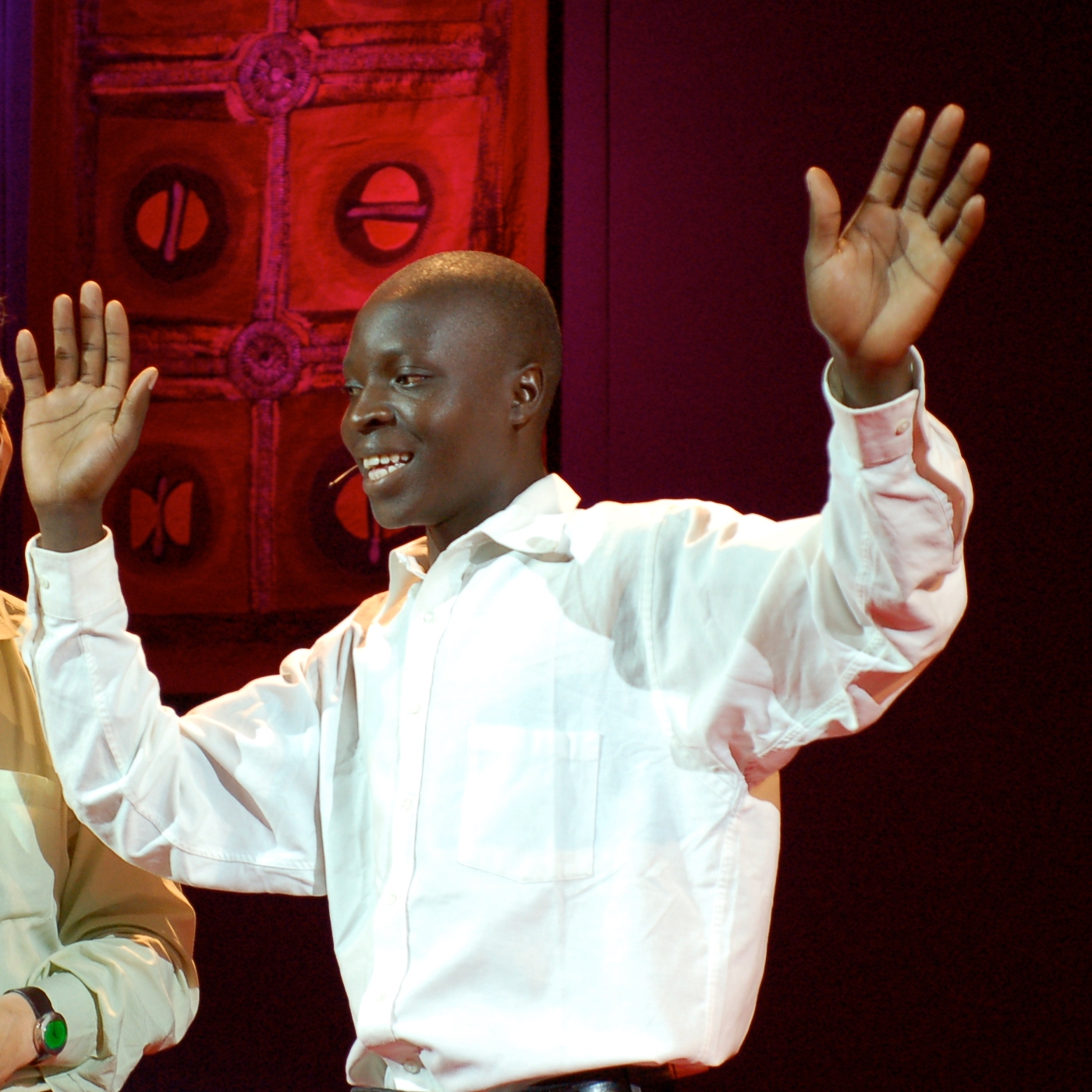
- Kamkwamba as a speaker in TED 2007
- Born: 5 August 1987 (age 39); Dowa, Malawi
- Education: Dartmouth College (BA)
- Occupation: Innovator
- Known for: Constructing a wind turbine from parts
- Website: https://williamkamkwamba.com/

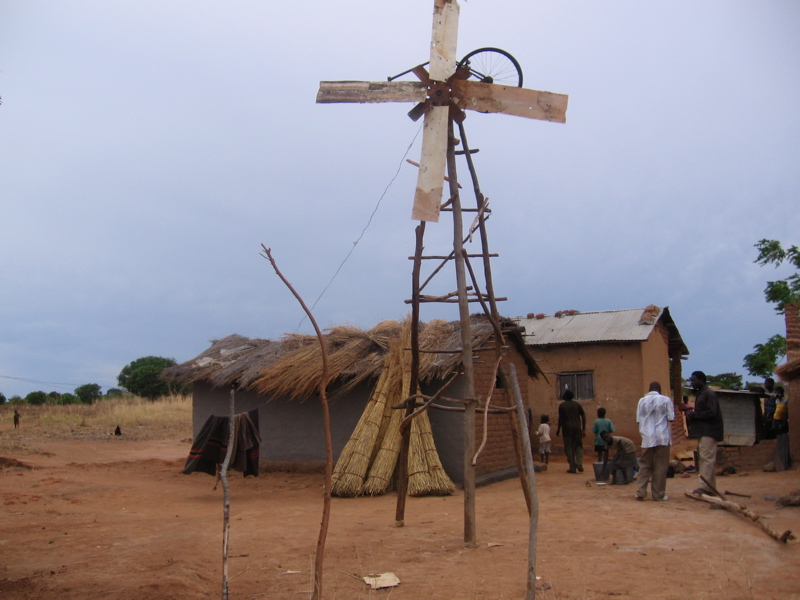
The first wind turbine

William Kamkwamba (born 5 August 1987) is a Malawian inventor, engineer, and author. He gained renown in his country in 2001 when he built a wind turbine to power multiple electrical appliances in his family's house in Wimbe, 23 kilometres (14 mi) east of Kasungu, using blue gum trees, bicycle parts, and materials collected in a local scrapyard. Since then, he has built a solar-powered water pump that supplies the first drinking water in his village and two other wind turbines, the tallest standing at 12 meters, and has built two more, including one in Lilongwe, the capital of Malawi. He also wrote a book about it called The Boy who Harnessed the Wind.

== Life and career ==
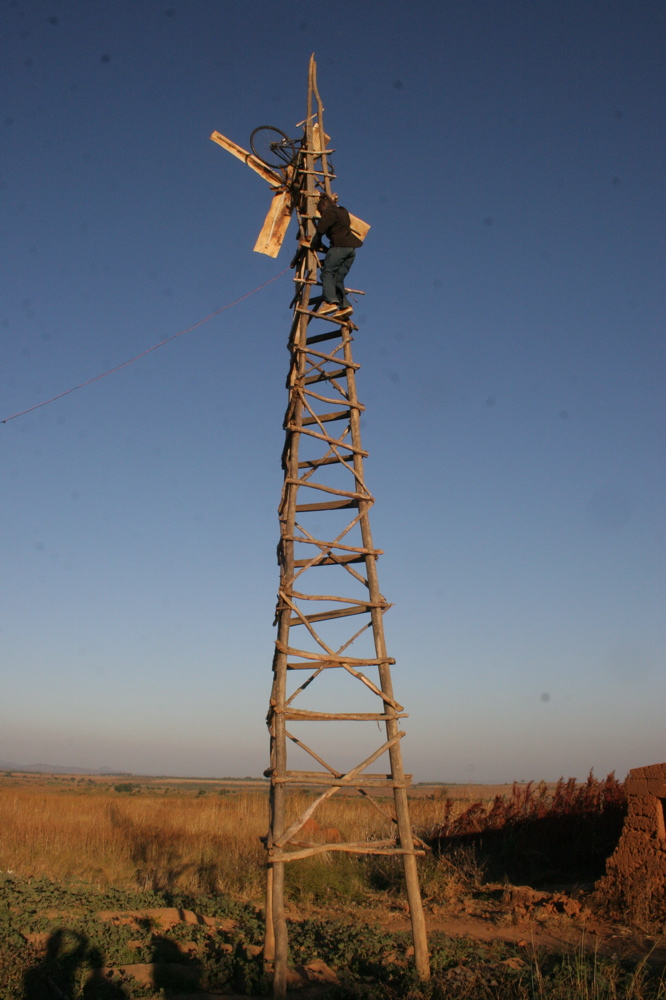
William Kamkwamba's new windmill

William Kamkwamba was born on 5 August 1987 in Dowa as the second of seven children to Agnes and Trywell Kamkwamba. He grew up in a peasant family in Masitala and belonged to the Anglican Church. From a young age, William enjoyed playing with his friends using recycled materials. Kamkwamba attended Wimbe Primary School and Kanchokolo secondary school until 2001, when Kamkwamba dropped out as his parents could no longer pay the annual tuition, equivalent to US$80, due to a crippling famine. In a desperate attempt to retain his education, Kamkwamba began to frequent the local school library; it was there that he discovered his love for electronics. Before, he had once set up a small business repairing his village's radios, but this work did not earn him much money.

After the famine, Kamkwamba went back to school, and later on he would have to pay fees that were over 2,000 kwacha. He snuck into school, but later on got caught, so William's dad would beg some teachers to let him stay, and when they did, William's dad would repay them with tobacco.

Kamkwamba, after reading a book called Using Energy, decided to create a makeshift wind turbine. He experimented with a small model using a cheap dynamo and eventually made a functioning wind turbine that powered his dad's radio. Local farmers and journalists investigated the spinning device and Kamkwamba's fame in international news skyrocketed. A blog about his accomplishments was written on Hacktivate and Kamkwamba took part in the first event celebrating his particular type of ingenuity called Maker Faire Africa in Ghana in August 2009.

Kamkwamba is one of four recipients of the 2010 GO Ingenuity Award, a prize awarded by the Santa Monica–based nonprofit GO Campaign to inventors, artists, and makers to promote the sharing of their innovations and skills with marginalized youth in developing nations. With the grant, Kamkwamba held workshops in his home village, teaching youths to make wind turbines and repair water pumps.

In 2007 Kamkwamba entered an intensive two-year academic program combining the Cambridge University A-levels curriculum with leadership, entrepreneurship, and African studies at the African Leadership Academy in Johannesburg, South Africa. He then went on to study at Dartmouth College, Class of 2014.

== Recognition ==
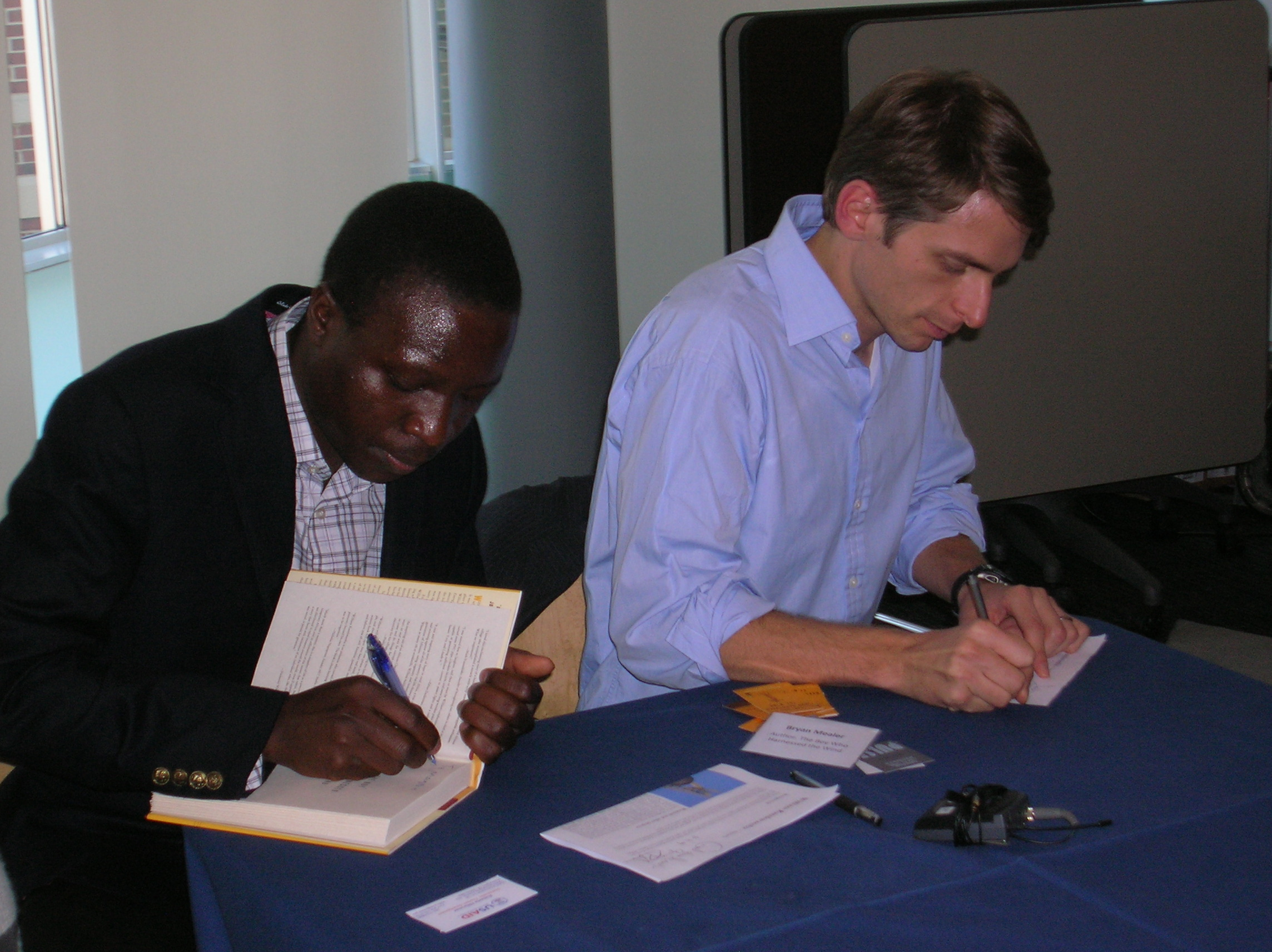
Kamkwamba at a book signing

When The Daily Times in Blantyre, the commercial capital of Malawi, wrote a story on Kamkwamba's wind turbine in November 2006, the story circulated through the blogosphere, and TED conference director Emeka Okafor (co-founder of Maker Faire Africa) invited Kamkwamba to talk at TEDGlobal 2007 in Arusha, Tanzania as a guest. His speech moved the audience, and several venture capitalists at the conference pledged to help finance his secondary education. His story was covered by Sarah Childress for The Wall Street Journal. He became a student at African Bible College Christian Academy in Lilongwe. He then went on to receive a scholarship to the African Leadership Academy and in 2014 graduated from Dartmouth College in Hanover, New Hampshire.

Among other appearances, Kamkwamba was interviewed on The Daily Show on 7 October 2009 (during which he was playfully compared to the fictional hero Angus MacGyver for his impressive scientific ingenuity). In addition, he was invited to and attended the 2011 Google Science Fair introductory meeting, where he was a guest speaker.

Kamkwamba, in 2008, founded a non-profit organization named "Moving Windmills Project" in order to be able to help support not only his local community in Kasangu, Malawi, but all communities in Malawi to be able to create hands-on development for all villages in Malawi. This includes sending children and underprivileged people to schools, building low-cost wells, installing solar powered pumps, renovating local schools by providing resources such as new facilities and learning materials. The Primary Goal of the Moving Windmills Project is to be able to provide basic needs such as clean water, have proper learning materials and facilities within schools, and sustainable farming, nutrition, and community programs to ensure a famine will never happen again or as severe as it was when William Kamkwamba endured the 2002 Malawi Famine.

Kamkwamba is the subject of the documentary film William and the Windmill, which won the Grand Jury Prize for Best Documentary Feature at the 2013 South By Southwest film festival in Austin, Texas.

In 2010, The Boy Who Harnessed the Wind was selected as the University of Florida and Boise State University common book, required for all incoming students to read. In 2014, it was selected as the common book at Auburn University and University of Michigan College of Engineering, as well. William made an appearance at each university to discuss his book and life.

In 2013 TIME magazine named Kamkwamba one of the "30 People Under 30 Changing The World."

Kamkwamba is featured in the book Extraordinary People by Michael Hearst and is also the subject of a song from the companion album Songs For Extraordinary People.

In 2014, Kamkwamba received a bachelor of arts degree in environmental studies from Dartmouth College in Hanover, New Hampshire where he was elected to the Sphinx Senior Honor Society. In 2019, The Boy Who Harnessed the Wind was adapted into a film, written and directed by Chiwetel Ejiofor. Kamkwamba is played by Maxwell Simba.
