= List of writers by name: K =

The following is a List of writers by name whose last names begin with K:

Abbreviations: ch = children's; d = drama, screenwriting; f = fiction; nf = non-fiction; p = poetry, song lyrics

== Ka ==
- Aminata Maïga Ka (1940–2005, Senegal, nf)
- Maung Thaw Ka (1928–1991, Burma/Myanmar, nf)
- Keri Kaa (1942–2020, N Zealand, nf)
- Maguy Kabamba (born 1960, Democratic R of Congo, f)
- Philippa Namutebi Kabali-Kagwa (born 1964, Uganda/S Africa, nf/p)
- Maati Kabbal (born 1954, Morocco, nf)
- Kabir (1398/1440—1448/1518, India, p)
- Kabubi Herman (living, Uganda, p)
- Busingye Kabumba (born 1982, Uganda, p)
- Metin Kaçan (1961–2013, Turkey, f)
- Inaam Kachachi (born 1952, Iraq, f/nf)
- Aubrey Kachingwe (1926–2010s, Nyasaland/Malawi, f)
- Ismail Kadare (1936–2024, Albania, f/p/d)
- Juliusz Kaden-Bandrowski (1885–1944, Russian E/Poland, nf/f)
- Abdullah Abdul Kadir (1796–1854, Malaya/Ottoman E, nf)
- Cynthia Kadohata (born 1956, US, ch)
- Eiko Kadono (角野栄子, born 1935, Japan, ch/nf)
- Jacques de Kadt (1897–1988, Netherlands, nf)
- Margit Kaffka (1880–1918, Hungary, p/f/nf)
- Franz Kafka (1883–1924, Austria E/Czechoslovakia, f)
- Otohiko Kaga (加賀乙彦, 1929–2023, Japan, f)
- Alexis Kagame (1912–1981, Rwanda, nf/p)
- Julie Kagawa (born 1982, US, f)
- Toyohiko Kagawa (賀川豊彦, 1888–1960, Japan, nf)
- Peter Kagayi (living, Uganda, p)
- Apollo Kaggwa (1864–1927, Uganda, nf)
- Mohammed Kaghat (1942–2001, Morocco, d/nf)
- Prince Kagwema (born 1931, Tanzania, f/nf)
- Wanuri Kahiu (born 1980, Kenya, d)
- Gustave Kahn (1859–1936, France, p/nf)
- Joan Kahn (1914–1994, US, f/ch)
- Takeshi Kaikō (開高健, 1930–1989, Japan, f/nf)
- Bairagi Kainla (born 1939, Nepal, p/nf), pseudonym of Til Bikram Nembang Limbu
- Chōgorō Kaionji (海音寺潮五郎, 1901–1977, Japan, f), pseudonym of Tōsaku Suetomi (末富東作)
- Friedrich Kaiser (1814–1874, Austria, df)
- Georg Kaiser (1878–1945, Germany/Switzerland, d)
- Isabelle Kaiser (1866–1925, Switzerland, p/f)
- Shahidullah Kaiser (1927 – post-1971, India/Bangladesh, f)
- Motojirō Kajii (梶井基次郎, 1901–1932, Japan, p)
- Shinji Kajio (梶尾真治, born 1947, Japan, f)
- Ikki Kajiwara (高森朝樹, 1936–1987, Japan, f), pseudonym of Asaki Takamori
- Toshiyuki Kajiyama (梶山季之, 1930–1975, Japan/Hong Kong, f)
- Faizullah Kakar (born 1950, Afghanistan, nf)
- Kakinomoto no Hitomaro (柿本人麻呂, c. 653/655–707/710, Japan, p)
- Ivan Kakovitch (1933–2006, USSR/France, nf)
- Dragoš Kalajić (1943–2005, Yugoslavia/Serbia, nf)
- Shamsuddin Abul Kalam (1926–1997, India/Bangladesh, f)
- Ana Kalandadze (1924–2008, USSR/Georgia, p)
- Paul Kalanithi (1977–2015, US, nf)
- Max Kalbeck (1850–1921, Germany/Austria, nf)
- Mascha Kaléko (1907–1975, Austrian E/Switzerland, p)
- Kālidāsa (fl. 4th – 5th c. CE, India. p)
- David Kalisch (1820–1872, Germany, d/nf), pseudonym D. J. Schalk
- Aino Kallas (1878–1956, Finland/Estonia, f)
- Mons Kallentoft (born 1968, Sweden, f)
- Theodor Kallifatides (born 1938, Greece/Sweden, p/f)
- Chester Kallman (1921–1975, US, p)
- Yann-Ber Kalloc'h (1888–1917, France, p), born Jean-Pierre Calloc'h
- Maira Kalman (born 1949, Israel/US, ch)
- Harry Kalmer (1956–2019, S Africa, f/nf/d)
- László Kálnoky (1912–1985, Hungary, p/nf)
- Sophie Heidi Kam (born 1968, Burkina Faso, p/d/f)
- Sufia Kamal 1911–1999, India/Bangladesh, f/nf)
- Keturah Kamugasa (1967–2017, Uganda, nf)
- Kama Sywor Kamanda (born 1952, Congo/DRC, p/f/d)
- Esther Kamatari (born 1951, Burundi, nf)
- Samson Kambalu (born 1965, Malawi, nf)
- Guðmundur Kamban (1888–1945, Iceland, d/f)
- Kambar (1180–1250, India, p)
- Ariake Kambara (蒲原有明, 1876–1952, Japan, p/f)
- Chōhei Kambayashi (神林長平, born 1953, Japan, f)
- Ezzat el Kamhawi (born 1961, Egypt, f/nf)
- Anna Kamieńska (1920–1986, Poland, p/nf/ch)
- Wladimir Kaminer (born 1967, Soviet Union/Germany, f/nf)
- Ilya Kaminsky (born 1977, USSR/US, p)
- William Kamkwamba (born 1987, Malawi, nf)
- Gertrude Webster Kamkwatira (born c. 1966, Malawi, d)
- Kamo no Chōmei (鴨長明, 1153/1155–1216, Japan, nf/p)
- Whyghtone Kamthunzi (1956–2000, Nyasaland/Malawi, f/d)
- Toni Kan (born 1971, Nigeria, f)
- Kanagaki Robun (仮名垣魯文, 1829–1894, Japan, f/nf), pseudonym of Nozaki Bunzō (野崎文蔵)
- Mieko Kanai (金井美恵子, born 1947, Japan, f/p)
- Amy Kane (1879–1979, N Zealand, nf)
- Cheikh Hamidou Kane (born 1928, Senegal, f)
- Musashi Kanbe (かんべむさし, born 1948, Japan, f)
- Nataša Kandić (born 1946, Yugoslavia/Serbia, nf)
- Mare Kandre (1962–2005, Sweden, f/nf/ch)
- Andrea Kane (living, US, f)
- Julia Kane (1897–1985, England, f/d), pseudonym of Denise Robins
- Kathleen Kane (born 1951, US), pseudonym of Maureen Child
- Ndèye Fatou Kane (born 1986, Senegal, f/nf)
- Sarah Kane (1971–1999, England, d)
- Hitomi Kanehara (金原ひとみ, born 1983, Japan, f)
- Amita Kanekar (born 1965, Goa/India, f/nf)
- Misuzu Kaneko (金子みすゞ, 1903–1930, Japan, p)
- Mitsuharu Kaneko (金子光晴, 1895–1975, Japan, p/nf)
- Kang Youwei (康有為, 1858–1927, China, nf)
- Orhan Veli Kanık (1914–1950, Ottoman E/Turkey, p)
- Yoram Kaniuk (1930–2019, Palestine/Israel, f/nf/ch)
- Chibamba Kanyama (born 1965, Zambia, nf)
- John Christoffel Kannemeyer (1939–2011, S Africa, nf)
- Mohammed Khammar Kanouni (1938–1991, Morocco, p)
- Fabienne Kanor (born 1970, France, f/ch)
- Hermann Kant (1926–2016, Germany, f)
- Immanuel Kant (1724–1804, Germany, nf)
- Sándor Kányádi (1929–2018, Romania/Hungary, p/ch)
- Jeffrey Kaplan (1954–2025, US, nf)
- Jaan Kaplinski (1941–2021, USSR/Estonia, p/nf/f)
- Momo Kapor (1937–2010, Yugoslavia/Serbia, f)
- Colin Kapp (1928–2007, England, f)
- Walter Kappacher (1938–2024, Austria, f/nf)
- Franz Xaver Kappus (1883–1966, Austria-Hungary/Germany, p/f/d)
- Ryszard Kapuściński (1932–2007, Poland, nf)
- S. Avdo Karabegović (1878–1908, Ottoman E/Serbia, p)
- Mina Karadžić (1828–1894, Austria, nf)
- Radovan Karadžić (born 1945, Yugoslavia/Serbia, p)
- Vuk Karadžić (1787–1864, Ottoman E/Austrian E, nf)
- Veli Karahoda (born 1968, Yugoslavia/Kosovo, f/p/nf)
- Karai Senryū (柄井川柳, 1718–1790, Japan, p)
- Angel Karaliychev (1902–1972, Bulgaria, ch)
- Aco Karamanov (1927–1944, Yugoslavia, p)
- Sadegh Karamyar (born 1959, Iran, f/nf/d)
- Shakuntala Karandikar (1931–2018, India, nf)
- Einar Kárason (born 1955, Iceland, f/p)
- Vim Karénine (born 1933, US/France, p/f)
- Srđan Karanović (born 1945, Yugoslavia/Serbia, d)
- Hellmuth Karasek (1934–2015, Czechoslovakia/Germany, nf/f)
- Adeena Karasick (born 1965, Canada, nf/p)
- Georgi Karaslavov (1904–1980, Bulgaria, f)
- Hristo Karastoyanov (born 1950, Bulgaria, f/nf/p)
- Uladzimir Karatkievich (1930–1984, USSR, p/f/nf)
- Vim Karénine (born 1933, US/France, p/f)
- Ulrich Karger (born 1957, Germany, f/nf/ch)
- Jozef Karika (born 1978, Czechoslovakia/Slovakia, nf)
- Janet Karim (born 1954, Malawi, nf)
- Rashid Karim (1925–2011, India/Bangladesh, f/nf)
- Sheikh Fazlul Karim (1882–1936, India, f/p)
- Ferenc Karinthy (1921–1992, Hungary, f/d/nf)
- Frigyes Karinthy (1887–1938, Hungary, f/d/p)
- Erik Axel Karlfeldt (1864–1931, Sweden, p)
- Alma Karlin (1889–1950, Austrian E/Yugoslavia, f/nf/d)
- Bjarki Karlsson (born 1965, Iceland, p/nf)
- Kristján Karlsson (1922–2014, Iceland, p/f/nf)
- Mette Karlsvik (born 1978, Norway, f/nf/ch)
- József Kármán (1769–1795, Hungary, f/nf)
- Farida Karodia (born 1942, S Africa, f)
- György Károly (1953–2018, Hungary, p/nf)
- Jan Karon (born 1937, US, f/nf/ch)
- Franciszek Karpiński (1741–1825, Poland, p)
- Mary Karr (born 1955, US, p/nf)
- Zurab Karumidze (born 1957, USSR/Georgia, f/nf)
- Zenzō Kasai (葛西善蔵, 1887–1928, Japan, f)
- Milan Kašanin (1895–1981, Austria-Hungary/Yugoslavia, nf)
- Marie Luise Kaschnitz (1901–1974, Germany/Italy, f/p/nf)
- Julia Kasdorf (born 1962, US, p)
- Anna Kashina (living, USSR/US, f)
- Agha Shorish Kashmiri (1917–1975, India/Pakistan, p/nf)
- Nikola T. Kašiković (1861–1927, Ottoman E/Yugoslavia, nf)
- Stoja Kašiković (1865 – post-1927, Ottoman E/Yugoslavia, nf)
- Laura Kasischke (born 1961, US, f/p)
- Jan Kasprowicz (1860–1926, Prussia/Poland, p/d/nf)
- Lajos Kassák (1887–1967, Hungary, p/f/nf)
- Abraham Gotthelf Kästner (1719–1800, Germany, nf/p)
- Erich Kästner (1899–1974, Germany, f/p/ch)
- Elizabeth Kata (1912–1998, Australia, f/d), pseudonym of Elizabeth Colina Katayama
- Noburu Katagami (片上伸, 1884–1928, Japan, nf)
- Olivera Katarina (born 1940, Yugoslavia/Serbia, nf)
- Kyoichi Katayama (片山恭一, born 1959, Japan, f)
- Faiz Muhammad Kateb (1860–1931, Afghanistan, nf)
- Katip Çelebi (1609–1657, Ottoman E, nf)
- Wilson Katiyo (1947–2003, S Rhodesia/Zimbabwe, f)
- Masato Katō (加藤正人, born 1963, Japan, d)
- József Katona (1791–1830, Hungary, d/p)
- Fadi Kattan (born 1977 or 1978, Palestine, nf)
- Hilda Katz (1909–1997, US, nf)
- John Katzenbach (born 1950, US, f)
- Bob Kaufman (1925–1986, US, p)
- Jonathan Kaufman (born 1956, US, nf)
- Shirley Kaufman (1923–2016, US/Israel, p)
- Walter Kaufmann (1924–2021, Germany/Australia, f)
- Kenneth Kaunda (1924–2021, Zambia, nf)
- Rupi Kaur (born 1992, India/Canada, p)
- Helmut Käutner (1908–1980, Germany/Italy, d)
- Alex Kava (born 1960, US, f)
- Anna Kavan (1901–1968, France/England, f)
- Patrick Kavanagh (1904–1967, Ireland, p/f)
- Joanna Kavenna (born 1974, England, f/nf)
- Kavisekhara Dr Umar Alisha (1885–1945, India, p/nf)
- Datta Raghunath Kavthekar (1901–1979, India, f)
- Catherine Samali Kavuma (born 1960, Uganda, f)
- Nikos Kavvadias (1910–1975, Greece, p/f/nf)
- Yasunari Kawabata (川端康成, 1899–1972, Japan, f)
- Jun Kawada (川田順, 1882–1966, Japan, p)
- Matsutarō Kawaguchi (川口松太郎, 1899–1985, Japan, f/d)
- Ryuko Kawaji (川路柳虹, 1888–1959, Japan, p/nf), pseudonym of Kawaki Makoto (川路柳虹)
- Hiromi Kawakami (川上弘美, born 1958, Japan, f/p/nf)
- Kikuko Kawakami (川上喜久子, 1904–1985, Japan, f/p)
- Kiyoshi Kawakami (河上清, 1873–1949, Japan, nf)
- Chiaki Kawamata (川又千秋, born 1948, Japan, f/nf)
- Kawatake Mokuami (河竹黙阿弥, 1816–1893, Japan, d), pseudonym of Yoshimura Yoshisaburō (吉村芳三郎)
- Merata Kawharu (living, N Zealand, nf)
- Elizabeth Kay (born 1949, England, ch)
- Karen Kay (living, US), pseudonym of Karen Kay Wilson Elstner
- Simone Kaya (1937–2007, Ivory Coast, f)
- M. M. Kaye (1908–2004, England, f/ch/d)
- Legson Kayira (c. 1942–2012, Nyasaland/Malawi, nf)
- Kaykobad (c. 1857–1951, India, p)
- Susanna Kaysen (born 1948, US, nf)
- Nikos Kazantzakis (1883–1957, Greece/Germany, f/d/nf)
- Judith Kazantzis (1940–2018, England, p)
- Alexander Kazbegi (1848–1893, Russian E, f/d)
- Kazem Kazemi (born 1968, Afghanistan/Iran, nf)
- Mihajlo Kažić (born 1960, Yugoslavia/Germany, f)
- Hélène Kaziende (born 1967, Niger/Togo, f)
- Ferenc Kazinczy (1759–1831, Hungary, nf/p)
- Kazuki Sakuraba (桜庭一樹, born 1971, Japan, f)

== Ke–Kh ==
- Ke Yan (柯岩, 1929–2011, China, d/f/p)
- Ke Zhao (柯召, 1910–2002, China, nf)
- Jayne Fenton Keane (living, Australia, p)
- John Fryer Thomas Keane (1854–1937, England, nf)
- Janet Kear (1933–2004, England, nf)
- Martha Kearney (born 1957, Ireland/England, d)
- Annie Keary (1825–1879, England, f/p/ch)
- Charles Francis Keary (1848–1917, England, nf/f)
- Ezra Jack Keats (1916–1983, US, ch)
- John Keats (1795–1821, England/Italy, p)
- Moges Kebede (living, Ethiopia/US, f/nf)
- Elizabeth Keckley (1818–1907, US, nf)
- Rod Kedward (born 1937–2023, England, nf)
- Carolyn Keene (20th c., US, f), collective pseudonym
- Charles Keeping (1924–1988, England, ch)
- Weldon Kees (1914 – disappeared 1955, US, p/f/d)
- Nancy Keesing (1923–1993, Australia, p/nf/ch)
- Antigone Kefala (1935–2022, Australia, p/nf)
- Daniel Kehlmann (born 1975, Germany/US, f/d)
- Thomas Keightley (1789–1872, Ireland/England, nf)
- Ernst Keil (1816–1878, Germany, nf)
- Aoua Kéita (1912–1980, French Sudan/Mali, nf)
- Fatou Keïta (born 1969, Ivory Coast, ch/f)
- Fatoumata Keïta (born 1977, Mali, f/p/nf)
- Fodéba Keïta (1921–1969, Guinea, p/f/d)
- China Keitetsi (born 1976, Uganda, nf)
- Harold Keith (1903–1998, US, ch/f)
- Sheridan Keith (born 1942, N Zealand, f)
- Christopher Kelen (born 1958, Australia, p/f/nf)
- S. K. Kelen (born 1956, Australia, p)
- Stephen Kelen (1912–2003, Hungary/Australia, f/d/nf), born István Kelen)
- Anne Kellas (living, S Africa/Australia, p/nf)
- Emma Gilbey Keller (born c. 1961, England/US, nf)
- Gottfried Keller (1819–1890, Switzerland, p/f)
- Hans Peter Keller (1815–1888, Germany, p)
- Helen Keller (1880–1968, US, nf)
- Werner Keller (1909–1980, Germany/Switzerland, nf)
- Kitty Kelley (born 1942, US, nf)
- Johan Henric Kellgren (1751–1795, Sweden, p/nf)
- Friedrich Kellner (1885–1970, Germany, nf)
- Kathleen Kellow (1906–1993, England, f), pseudonym of Eleanor Burford Hibbert
- Carla Kelly (born 1947, US)
- Eric P. Kelly (1884–1960, US, nf/ch)
- George Kelly (1887–1974, US, d)
- Gwen Kelly (1922–2012, Australia, f/p/nf)
- Herbert Kelly (1860–1950, England, nf)
- Isabella Kelly (1759–1857, Scotland/England, f/p)
- John Kelly (1750–1809, Isle of Man, nf)
- Lindy Kelly (born 1952, N Zealand, ch/f/d)
- James Kelman (born 1946, Scotland, f/d/nf)
- Stephen Kelman (born 1976, England, f)
- Elizabeth Kelso (1889–1967, N Zealand, nf)
- Arthur Kelton (d. 1549/1550, Wales, p)
- Elmer Kelton (1926–2009, US, f)
- Orhan Kemal (1914–1970, Ottoman E/Bulgaria, f)
- Yaşar Kemal (1923–2015, Turkey, f)
- Zsigmond Kemény (1814–1875, Hungary, nf/f)
- Gene Kemp (1926–2015, England, ch)
- Mark Kemp (born 1960, US, nf)
- Richard Kemp (born 1959, England, nf)
- Margery Kempe (c. 1373 – post-1438, England, nf)
- Thomas à Kempis (c. 1380–1471, Germany/England, nf)
- Walter Kempowski (1929–2007, Germany, f/nf)
- Yasin Osman Kenadid (1919–1988, Somalia/Italy, nf)
- Randall Kenan (1963–2020, US, f)
- Stanley Onjezani Kenani (born 1976, Malawi, p/f)
- Edward Augustus Kendall (c. 1776–1842, England, nf/f)
- Henry Kendall (1839–1882, Australia, p)
- Kaur Kender (born 1971, USSR/Estonia, f)
- Sharon Kendrick (living, England, f)
- Francis Kenna (1865–1932, Australia, p/nf)
- Anne Kennedy (born 1959, N Zealand, f/d/p)
- Benjamin Hall Kennedy (1804–1889, England, nf)
- Cate Kennedy (born 1963, England/Australia, p/f)
- Charles Rann Kennedy (1808–1867, England, nf/f)
- Dennis Kennedy (born 1940, US, nf/d/f)
- Elle Kennedy (living, Canada, f)
- Emma Kennedy (born 1967, England, nf)
- Geoffrey Studdert Kennedy (1883–1929, England, nf/p)
- Hubert Kennedy (born 1931, US, nf/f)
- John F. Kennedy (1917–1963, US, Washington DC)
- Lena Kennedy (1914–1986, England, f/nf)
- Margaret Kennedy (1896–1967, England, f/d)
- Miranda Kennedy (born 1975, US, nf)
- Robert F. Kennedy (1925–1968, US)
- Robert F. Kennedy Jr. (born 1954, US)
- Ted Kennedy (1932–2009, US, Boston)
- Walter Kennedy (c. 1455 – c. 1508, Scotland, p)
- X. J. Kennedy (1929–2026, US, p/nf/ch)
- Alice Annie Kenny (1875–1960, N Zealand, p/f)
- Elizabeth Kenny (1880–1952, Australia, nf)
- Alexander Kent (1924–2017, England, f), pseudonym of Douglas Reeman
- Hannah Kent (born 1985, Australia, f)
- Jacqueline Kent (born 1947, Australia, nf/ch), pseudonym Frances Cook
- Jean Kent (born 1951, Australia, p)
- Louise Andrews Kent (1886–1969, US, ch/nf)
- Jomo Kenyatta (c. 1897–1978, Kenya, nf)
- Jane Kenyon (1947–1995, US, p)
- Michael Kenyon (1931–2005, England/US, f)
- Sherrilyn Kenyon (born 1965, US, f)
- Géza Képes (1909–1989, Hungary, p)
- Angela Kepler (born 1943, N Zealand, nf)
- Johannes Kepler (1571–1630, Germany, nf)
- Rivka Keren (born 1946, Hungary/Israel, ch/f), born Katalin Friedländer
- Navid Kermani (born 1967, Germany, f/nf/ch)
- Frank Kermode (1919–2010, Isle of Man/England, nf)
- Josephine Kermode (1852–1937, Isle of Man/England, p/d), pseudonym Cushag
- Justinus Kerner (1786–1862, Germany, p/nf)
- Jack Kerouac (1922–1969, US, f/nf)
- Jan Kerouac (1952–1996, US, f/nf)
- Joan Haverty Kerouac (1931–1990, US, nf)
- Alfred Kerr (1867–1948, Germany, nf)
- Bob Kerr (born 1951, N Zealand, ch)
- Judith Kerr (1923–2019, Germany/England, ch)
- Lady Amabel Kerr (1846–1906, England, f/nf)
- Philip Kerr (1956–2018, Scotland/England, f)
- Tom Kerridge (born 1973, England, nf)
- Ian Kershaw (born 1943, England, nf)
- Janko Kersnik (1852–1897, Austrian E, p/f/nf)
- Imre Kertész (1929–2016, Hungary, nf)
- Raymonde de Kervern (1899–1973, Mauritius, p)
- Ken Kesey (1935–2001, US, f/nf)
- David Kessler (born 1957, England, f)
- Harry Graf Kessler (1868–1937, France/Germany, nf
- Liz Kessler (born 1966, England, ch)
- George Kettmann (1898–1970, Netherlands, p/f/nf)
- Irmgard Keun (1905–1982, Germany, f)
- Alexander Key (1904–1979, US, f/ch)
- Daniel Keyes (1927–2014, US, f/nf)
- Marian Keyes (born 1963, Ireland, f/nf)
- Sidney Keyes (1922–1943, England/Tunisia, p)
- Harriette A. Keyser (1841–1936, US, f/nf)
- Eduard von Keyserling (1855–1918, Russian E/Germany, f/d/nf)
- Euphrase Kezilahabi (1944–2020, Tanzania, f/p/nf)
- Keorapetse Kgositsile (1938–2018, S Africa, p/nf), pseudonym Bra Willie
- Qiamuddin Khadim (1901–1979, Afghanistan, nf/p)
- Abbas Khadir (born 1973, Iraq/Germany, p/f/nf), writes in German
- Yasmina Khadra (born 1955, Algeria/France, f), pseudonym of Mohammed Moulessehoul
- Mi Mi Khaing (1916–1990, Burma/Myanmar, nf)
- Hafizullah Khaled (living, Afghanistan/Austria, p/nf)
- Mohammed Khaïr-Eddine (1941–1995, Morocco, nf)
- 'Masechele Caroline Ntseliseng Khaketla (1918–2012, Basutoland/Lesotho, p/nf)
- Ibn Khaldun (1332–1406, Hafsid Sultanate/Egypt, nf)
- Walid Khalidi (1925–2026, Palestine/US, nf)
- Khalilullah Khalili (1907–1987, Afghanistan, p/nf)
- Mimi Khalvati (born 1944, Iran/England, p)
- Ahmad Al-Khamisi (born 1948, Egypt, f/nf)
- Dilwar Khan (1937–2013, India/Bangladesh, p)
- Mahmona Khan (born 1973, Norway, nf/f)
- Naseem Khan (1939–2017, England, nf)
- Rahat Khan (1940–2020, India/Bangladesh, f/nf)
- Razia Khan (c. 1936–2011, India/Bangladesh, f/nf)
- Uzma Aslam Khan (living, Pakistan, f/nf)
- Dalal Khario (born c. 1997, Iraq/Germany, nf)
- Daniil Kharms (1905–1942, Soviet Union, p/ch/nf)
- Edwar al-Kharrat (1926–2015, Egypt, f/nf)
- Abdelkebir Khatibi (1938–2009, Morocco, f/d/p)
- Ajmal Khattak (1925–1970, India/Pakistan, nf/p)
- Khushal Khattak (1613–1689, Mughal Empire, p)
- Fatemeh Khavari (born 2000, Iran, nf)
- Rita El Khayat (born 1944, Morocco, nf)
- Omar Khayyam (1048–1131, Persia, nf/p)
- Aïssa Khelladi (born 1953, Algeria, f/d/p)
- Khoo Kheng-Hor (born 1956, Malaya/Malaysia, f/nf)
- Myint Myint Khin (1923–2014, Burma/Myanmar, nf/p)
- Vladislav Khodasevich (1886–1939, Russian E/USSR, p/nf)
- Esmail Khoi (1938–2021, Iran/England, p)
- Ungulani Ba Ka Khosa (born 1957, Mozambique, f/nf)
- Reza Khoshnazar (living, Iran/Sweden, f)
- Khosrov of Andzev (died 964, Armenia, nf)
- Driss El Khouri (living, Mozambique, f)
- Elias Khoury (born 1948, Lebanon, f/d/nf)
- Raymond Khoury (born 1960, Lebanon, d/f)
- Vénus Khoury-Ghata (1937–2026, Lebanon/France, p/f)
- Bashir Khrayyef (1917–1983, Tunisia, f)
- Mkrtich Khrimian (1820–1907, Ottoman E/Russian E, nf)
- Johannes Khuen (1606–1675, Germany, p)
- Syed Mahmood Khundmiri (1938–2011, India, p)
- Amir Khusrau (1253–1325, India, p/nf), full name Abu'l Hasan Yamīn ud-Dīn Khusrau
- Mariam Khutsurauli (born 1960, USSR/Georgia, p)
- Mohammad Ibraheem Khwakhuzhi (1920–1992, Afghanistan, p/f/nf)

== Ki–Kn ==
- Ki no Tsurayuki (紀貫之, 872–945, Japan, nf/p)
- Leo Kiacheli (1884–1963, Russian E/USSR, f)
- Saba Kidane (born 1978, Eritrea, p/nf)
- Kathryn H. Kidd (1950–2015, US, nf/f)
- Tracy Kidder (1945–2026, US, nf)
- Fiona Kidman (born 1940, N Zealand, f/p/d)
- Eduardo Gudiño Kieffer (1935–2002, Argentina, f/d/ch)
- Alexander Kielland (1849–1906, Norway, f/d/nf)
- Gustava Kielland (1800–1889, Norway, p/nf)
- Benedict Kiely (1919–2007, Ireland, nf)
- Søren Kierkegaard (1813–1855, Denmark, nf/p)
- Susan Nalugwa Kiguli (born 1969, Uganda, p/nf)
- Emelihter Kihleng (living, Micronesia, p)
- Wanjiru Kihoro (1953–2006, Kenya, nf)
- Andrzej Kijowski (1928–1985, Poland, nf/d)
- Andrzej Tadeusz Kijowski (born 1954, Poland, nf/p)
- Lali Kiknavelidze (born 1969, USSR/Georgia, d)
- Kan Kikuchi (菊池寛, 1888–1948, Japan, f/nf)
- Kuri Kikuoka (菊岡久利, 1909–1970, Japan, p/f)
- Yejide Kilanko (born 1975, Nigeria, p/f/ch)
- Abdelfattah Kilito (born 1945, Morocco, nf)
- Thomas Killigrew (1612–1683, England, d)
- Joyce Kilmer (1886–1918, US, p/nf)
- Dorothy Kilner (1755–1836, England, ch), pseudonyms M. P. and Mary Pelham
- Mary Ann Kilner (1753–1831, England, ch)
- Garry Kilworth (born 1941, England, f)
- Barbara Kimenye (1929–2012, England/Uganda, ch)
- Jamaica Kincaid (born 1949, Antigua/US, f/nf)
- Clive King (1924–2018, England, f/d/ch)
- Dorothy King (born 1975, US/England, nf)
- Edward King (1612–1637, Ireland/England, p)
- Francis King (1923–2011, Switzerland/England, f/nf)
- Henry King (1592–1669, England, p)
- Martin Luther King Jr. (1929–1968, US, nf)
- Michael King (1945–2004, N Zealand, nf)
- Owen King (born 1977, US, f)
- Rachael King (born 1970, N Zealand, f)
- Stephen King (born 1947, US, f)
- Susan King (born 1951, US, f)
- Tabitha King (born 1949, US, f/nf)
- William King (1663–1712, England, p)
- Karen King-Aribisala (living, Guyana/Nigeria, f)
- Alexander William Kinglake (1809–1891, England, nf)
- Thomas Kingo (1634–1703, Denmark, p)
- Charles Kingsley (1819–1875, England, f/nf/p)
- George Kingsley (1826–1892, England, nf)
- Henry Kingsley (1830–1876, England, f/nf)
- Mary Kingsley (1862–1900, England/S Africa, nf)
- Dick King-Smith (1922–2011, England, ch)
- Maxine Hong Kingston (湯亭亭, born 1940, China/US, f/nf)
- William Henry Giles Kingston (1814–1880, England, f/ch)
- Hans E. Kinck (1865–1926, Norway, f/d/nf)
- Gottfried Kinkel (1815–1882, Germany/Switzerland p/d/nf)
- Galway Kinnell (1927–2014, US, p)
- Jeff Kinney (born 1971, US, ch)
- Junji Kinoshita (木下順二, 1914–2006, Japan, d)
- Mokutaro Kinoshita (木下杢太郎, 1885–1945, Japan, nf)
- Kinoshita Rigen (木下利玄, 1886–1925, Japan, p)
- John Kinsella (born 1963, Australia, p/f/nf)
- Sophie Kinsella (1969–2025, England, f), pseudonym of Madeleine Sophie Wickham
- Thomas Kinsella (1928–2021, Ireland, p)
- W. P. Kinsella (1935–2016, Canada, f)
- Leonard Kip (1826–1906, US, nf)
- Rudyard Kipling (1865–1936, India/England, f/p/nf)
- Mohammed al-Tayyib ibn Kiran (1758–1812, Morocco, nf)
- Robert Kirby (1936–2007, S Africa, d/f/nf)
- Bodo Kirchhoff (born 1948, Germany/Italy, f/d)
- John Kiriamiti (born 1950, Kenya, nf/f)
- Natsuo Kirino (桐野夏生, born 1951, Japan, f), pseudonym of Mariko Hashioka
- Risto Kirjazovski (1927–2002, Greece/N Macedonia, nf)
- Russell Kirk (1918–1994, US, nf)
- Russell Kirkpatrick (born 1961, N Zealand, f/nf)
- Lucy Kirkwood (born 1983, England/Scotland, d)
- Sarah Kirsch (1935–2013, Germany, p)
- Hans Hellmut Kirst (1914–1989, Germany, f)
- Danilo Kiš (1935–1989, Yugoslavia, f/p)
- Necip Fazıl Kısakürek (1904–1983, Ottoman E/Turkey, p/f/d)
- Egon Kisch (1885–1948, Austrian E/Czechoslovakia, nf)
- Atala Kisfaludy (1836–1911, Hungary, p)
- Károly Kisfaludy (1788–1830, Hungary, d/p)
- Sándor Kisfaludy (1772–1844, p/d)
- Yusuke Kishi (貴志祐介, born 1959, Japan, f)
- Kyōko Kishida (岸田今日子, 1930–2006, Japan, ch)
- Rio Kishida (岸田理生, 1946–2003, Japan, d)
- Ephraim Kishon (1924–2005, Hungary/Switzerland, nf/ch/d)
- John Van der Kiste (born 1954, England, nf)
- Stefan Kisyov (born 1963, Bulgaria/Cuba, f/nf/d)
- Ikki Kita (北一輝, 1883–1937, Japan, nf)
- Morio Kita (北杜夫, 1927–2011, Japan, f/nf), pseudonym of Sōkichi Saitō (斎藤宗吉)
- Kitabatake Chikafusa (北畠親房, 1293–1354, Japan, nf)
- Yao Kitabatake (北畠八穂, 1903–1982, Japan, p/ch)
- Hakushū Kitahara (北原白秋, 1885–1942, Japan, p), pseudonym of Ryūkichi Kitahara (北原隆吉)
- Kenzo Kitakata (北方謙三, born 1947, Japan, f)
- Kaoru Kitamura (北村薫, born 1949, Japan, f), pseudonym of Kazuo Miyamoto (宮本和男)
- Kitamura Tōkoku (北村透谷, 1868–1894, Japan, p/nf), pseudonym of Kitamura Montarō (北村門太郎)
- Fred Kitchen (1890–1969, England, nf)
- C. H. B. Kitchin (1895–1967, England, f)
- William Kitchiner (1775–1827, England, nf)
- Aniceti Kitereza (1896–1981, Tanzania, f)
- Marvin Kitman (1929–2023, US, nf)
- Sandra Kitt (living, US, f)
- Kazuhiro Kiuchi (木内一裕, born 1960, Japan, f/ch)
- Iya Kiva (born 1984, Ukraine, p/f/nf)
- Aleksis Kivi (1834–1872, Finland, f/d)
- Albert Kivikas (1898–1978, Estonia, nf)
- Eila Kivikk'aho (1921–2004, Finland, p), pseudonym of Eila Sylvia Sammalkorpi
- Andrus Kivirähk (born 1970, USSR/Estonia, f/nf/d)
- Karin Kiwus (born 1942, Germany/US, p)
- Wycliffe Kiyingi (1929–2014, Uganda, d)
- Robert Kiyosaki (born 1947, US, nf)
- Carolyn Kizer (1925–2014, US, p)
- Joseph Ki-Zerbo (1922–2006, Burkina Faso, nf)
- Nils Kjær (1870–1924, Norway, d/f/nf)
- Jan Kjærstad (born 1953, Norway, f/nf)
- Magnús Kjartansson (1919–1981, Iceland, nf)
- Jim Kjelgaard (1910–1959, US, f/ch)
- Marjun Syderbø Kjelnæs (born 1974, Faroe Is, f/p/d)
- Johann Klaj (1616–1656, Germany, p)
- Ivan Klajn (1937–2021, Yugoslavia/Serbia, nf)
- Jon Klassen (born 1981, Canada, ch)
- Sarah Klassen (born 1932, Canada, f/p)
- Annette Curtis Klause (born 1953, England/US, ch/nf)
- David Kldiashvili (1862–1931, Russian E/USSR, f/d)
- Sergo Kldiashvili (1893–1986, Russian E/USSR, d)
- Edward Klein (born 1937, US, nf)
- Robin Klein (born 1936, Australia, ch)
- Nancy H. Kleinbaum (1948–2024, US, f/ch)
- Lois Kleinsasser (living, US, f), pseudonym Cait London
- August Kleinzahler (born 1949, US, p/nf)
- Ewald Christian von Kleist (1715–1759, Germany, p)
- Heinrich von Kleist (1777–1811, Germany, p/d/f)
- Jochen Klepper (1903–1942, Germany, nf/p)
- Lisa Kleypas (born 1964, US, f)
- Ernst August Friedrich Klingemann (1777–1831, Germany, f/d)
- Friedrich Maximilian von Klinger (1752–1831, Germany/Russian E, d/f)
- Tristan Klingsor (1874–1966, France, p/nf), pseudonym of Léon Leclère
- Richard Klinkhamer (1937–2016, Netherlands, nf)
- Kate Klise (born 1963, US, ch)
- Willem Kloos (1859–1938, Netherlands, p/nf)
- Friedrich Gottlieb Klopstock (1724–1803, Germany, p/d/nf)
- Chuck Klosterman (born 1972, US, nf/f)
- Alexander Kluge (1932–2026, Germany, f/nf)
- Ruth Klüger (1931–2020, Austria/US, nf), Holocaust survivor
- Richard A. Knaak (born 1961, US, f)
- Karl Ove Knausgård (born 1968, Norway, f)
- Matthew Kneale (born 1960, England, f)
- Nigel Kneale (1922–2006, Isle of Man/England, d/f)
- Hildegard Knef (1925–2002, Germany, nf)
- John Knewstub (1544–1624, England, nf)
- Boban Knežević (born 1959, Yugoslavia/Serbia, f)
- Marija Knežević (born 1963, Yugoslavia/Serbia, p/f/nf)
- Franciszek Dionizy Kniaźnin (1750–1807, Poland, p)
- Anne Knight (1786–1862, England/France, nf)
- Anne Knight (1792–1860, England, ch)
- Damon Knight (1922–2002, US, f/nf)
- Eric Knight (1897–1943, England, f/d)
- Etheridge Knight (1931–1991, US, p)
- Henry Gally Knight (1786–1846, England, f)
- India Knight (born 1965, Belgium/England, f/nf/ch)
- Raymond A. Knight (born 1944, US, nf)
- Vivien Knight (1953–2009, England, nf)
- James Sheridan Knowles (1784–1862, Ireland, d)
- John Knowles (1926–2001, US, f)
- Marion Knowles (1865–1949, p/f)
- Elizabeth Knox (born 1959, N Zealand, f)
- John Knox (c. 1514–1572, Scotland, nf)
- Ronald Knox (1888–1957, England, nf)
- Jan Knudsen (born 1957, Norway, f)
- Ingar Knudtsen (born 1944, Norway, f/p)
- Per Knutsen (born 1951, Norway, f/ch/d)
- Svavar Knútur (living, Iceland, p)

== Ko–Ks ==
- Hideo Kobayashi (小林秀雄, 1902–1983, Japan, nf)
- Kobayashi Issa (小林一茶, 1763–1828, Japan, p)
- Takiji Kobayashi (小林多喜二, 1903–1933, Japan, f)
- Peter Kocan (born 1947, Australia, p/f), born Peter Raymond Douglas
- Edvard Kocbek (1904–1981, Austrian E/Yugoslavia, p/nf)
- Herman Koch (born 1953, Netherlands, f/nf)
- Kenneth Koch (1925–2002, US, p/d)
- Martin Koch (1882–1940, Sweden, f)
- Werner Koch (born 1961, Germany, nf)
- Jan Kochanowski (1530–1584, Poland, p)
- Petar Kočić (1877–1916, Ottoman E/Serbia, f/nf)
- Charles Paul de Kock (1793–1871, France, f)
- Aya Kōda (幸田文, 1904–1990, Japan, nf/f)
- Kōda Rohan (幸田成行, 1867–1947, Japan, f)
- Đorđe Marković Koder (1806–1891, Austrian E/Austria-Hungary, f/p)
- János Kodolányi (1899–1969, Hungary, f/d/nf)
- Dayan Kodua (born 1980, Ghana/Germany, nf/ch)
- Shonagh Koea (born 1939, N Zealand, f)
- Wolfgang Koeppen (1906–1996, Germany, f)
- Arthur Koestler (1905–1983, Hungary/England, f/d/nf)
- Gerhard Kofler (1949–2005, Italy/Austria, p/nf)
- Izuki Kogyoku (紅玉いづき, born 1984, Japan, f)
- István Koháry (1649–1731, Hungary, p)
- Michael Köhlmeier (born 1949, Austria, nf)
- Leopold Kohr (1909–1994, Austria/England, nf)
- Youssof Kohzad (1935–2019, Afghanistan/US, d/p/nf)
- Saradha Koirala (born 1980, N Zealand, p/ch)
- B. P. Koirala (1914–1982, Nepal, f/nf)
- Koizumi Yakumo (小泉八雲, 1850–1904, Greece/Japan, nf)
- Miodrag Kojadinović (妙谠, born 1961, Serbia/China, nf)
- Masajirō Kojima (小島政二郎, 1894–1994, Japan, f)
- Nobuo Kojima (小島信夫, 1915–2006, Japan, f/nf)
- Usui Kojima (小島烏水, 1873–1948, Japan, nf)
- Ingrid de Kok (born 1951, S Africa, p/nf)
- Kokan Shiren (虎関師錬, 1278–1347, Japan, nf/p)
- Oskar Kokoschka (1886–1980, Austria/Switzerland, p/d)
- Yakub Kolas (1882–1956, USSR, p/f/d), pseudonym of Kanstantsin Mikhailovich Mitskievich
- Zlata Kolarić-Kišur (1894–1990, Austria-Hungary/Yugoslavia, f/nf)
- Þórðr Kolbeinsson (fl. 11th c., Iceland, p)
- Ferenc Kölcsey (1790–1838, Hungary, nf)
- Nikola Koljević (1936–1997, Yugoslavia/Serbia, nf)
- Adam František Kollár (1718–1783, Austria-Hungary, nf)
- Ján Kollár (1793–1852, Austria-Hungary, p/nf)
- Gertrud Kolmar (1894–1943, Germany, p), pseudonym of Gertrud Käthe Chodziesner, Holocaust victim
- Anise Koltz (1928–2023, Luxembourg, p/ch)
- Liv Køltzow (1945–2025, Norway, f/d/nf)
- Ōmi Komaki (小牧近江, 1894–1978, Japan, nf)
- Siré Komara (born 1991, Guinea/Egypt, nf/ch)
- Lazar Komarčić (1839–1909, Ottoman E/Serbia, f)
- Sakyo Komatsu (小松左京, 1931–2011, Japan, f)
- Kinyanjui Kombani (born 1981, Kenya, f/d/nf)
- Ellis Ayitey Komey (1927–1972, Ghana/England, f/p)
- Aladár Komját (1891–1937, Hungary, p/nf)
- Anna Komnene (1083–1183, Byzantine E, nf)
- Milan Komnenić (1940–2015, Yugoslavia/Serbia, p/nf)
- Komninos Zervos (born 1950, Australia, p)
- Leopold Kompert (1822–1886, Austrian E, f)
- Gerrit Komrij (1944–2012, Netherlands, p/f/d)
- Manuel Komroff (1890–1974, US, d/f/nf)
- Yusef Komunyakaa (born 1941, US, p), birth name James William Brown
- Hidemi Kon (今日出海, 1903–1984, Japan, nf)
- Prakash Kona (born 1967, India, f/nf/p)
- Asare Konadu (1932–1994, Gold Coast/Ghana, f/nf)
- Chiaki J. Konaka (小中千昭, born 1961, Japan, f)
- Venance Konan (born 1958, Ivory Coast, nf/f)
- Adame Ba Konaré (born 1947, Mali, nf/f)
- Moussa Konaté (1951–2013, Mali/France, f/nf/d)
- Marie Kondo (近藤麻理恵, born 1984, Japan, nf)
- Yoji Kondo (近藤陽次, 1933–2017, Japan, f)
- Béla Kondor (1931–1972, Hungary, p/nf)
- Amadou Koné (living, Burkina Faso, nf)
- Blaže Koneski (1921–1993, Yugoslavia/N Macedonia, p/nf)
- Fatos Kongoli (born 1944, Albania, f)
- Faik Konica (1875–1942, Albania, nf)
- E. L. Konigsburg (1930–2013, US, ch)
- Hans Koning (1921–2007, Netherlands, f/nf)
- Taeko Kono (河野多惠子, 1926–2015, Japan, f/nf)
- Tensei Kono (河野典生, 1935–2012, Japan, f)
- Halina Konopacka (1900–1989, Russian E/US, p)
- Maria Konopnicka (1842–1910, Russian E/Austria-Hungary, p/f/ch)
- Konrad von Würzburg (died 1287, Germany, p)
- György Konrád (1933–2019, Hungary, f/nf), pseudonym George Konrad
- Heinz G. Konsalik (1921–1999, Germany, f), pseudonym of Heinz Günther
- Aleko Konstantinov (1863–1897, Ottoman E/Bulgaria, f)
- Ventseslav Konstantinov (1940–2019, Bulgaria, f/nf)
- Radomir Konstantinović (1928–2011, Yugoslavia/Serbia, nf/f)
- Dorothy Koomson (born 1971, England, f)
- Dean Koontz (born 1945, US, f)
- Robin Koontz (born 1954, US, ch)
- Ted Kooser (born 1939, US, p)
- August Kopisch (1799–1853, Germany, p)
- Stanisław Korab-Brzozowski (1876–1901, Russian E/Austria-Hungary, p)
- Morten Korch (1876–1954, Denmark, f)
- Janusz Korczak (1878 or 1879–1942, Russian E/Poland, ch), Holocaust victim
- Ana Kordzaia-Samadashvili (born 1968, USSR/Georgia, f)
- Christiane Koren (1764–1815, Denmark/Norway, p/d)
- Koriun (5th c. CE, Armenia, nf)
- Gordon Korman (born 1963, Canada/US, f/ch)
- Ferenc Körmendi (1900–1972, Hungary/US, f)
- M. F. Korn (living, US, f)
- Cyril M. Kornbluth (1923–1958, US, f)
- Paul Kornfeld (1889–1942, Austrian E/Germany, d), Holocaust victim
- Julian Kornhauser (born 1946, Poland, p/f/nf)
- Valentyn Kornienko (1939–2011, Ukraine, f)
- Mary Norbert Körte (1934–2022, US, p)
- Sarah Kortemeier (living, US, p)
- Apollo Korzeniowski (1820–1889, Russian E/Austria-Hungary, p/d)
- Erih Koš (1913–2010, Austria-Hungary/Serbia, f/nf)
- Károly Kós (1883–1977, Hungary, f)
- Heinrich Köselitz (1854–1918, Germany, d), pseudonym Peter Gast
- Hiroshi Koshiba (小柴博, 1884–1925, Japan, nf)
- Sonya Koshkina (born 1985), Ukraine) non-f. wr.
- Jerzy Kosinski (1933–1991, Poland/US, f)
- Ciril Kosmač (1910–1980, Austria-Hungary/Yugoslavia, f/d)
- Srečko Kosovel (1904–1926, Austria-Hungary/Italy)
- József Kossics (1788–1867, Austria-Hungary/Hungary, 1788–1867, nf/p), also written Jožef Košič
- Laza Kostić (1841–1910, Austria-Hungary, p/nf)
- Conor Kostick (born 1964, Ireland, nf/f)
- Kosugi Tengai (小杉天外, 1865–1952, Japan, f)
- Dezső Kosztolányi (1885–1936, Hungary, p/f)
- Jóhannes úr Kötlum (1899–1972, Iceland, p/ch)
- August von Kotzebue (1761–1819, Germany, d/nf)
- Adjoua Flore Kouamé (born 1964, Ivory Coast, f)
- Pyabelo Chaold Kouly (born 1943, Togo/Germany, nf)
- Marie-Christine Koundja (born 1957, Chad, f)
- Ahmadou Kourouma (1927–2003, Ivory Coast, f)
- Rudy Kousbroek (1929–2010, Dutch East Indies/Netherlands, p/nf)
- Kōshun Takami (高見広春, born 1969, Japan, f)
- Seydou Badian Kouyaté (1928–2018, French Sudan/Mali, f/p)
- Lojze Kovačič (1928–2004, Yugoslavia/Slovenia, f/ch)
- Kajetan Kovič (1931–2014, Yugoslavia/Slovenia, p/nf/ch)
- Shih-Li Kow (born 1968, Malaysia, f)
- Alicia Kozameh (born 1953, Argentina, f/p/nf)
- Daniel Koziarski (born 1949, Poland, f)
- Urszula Kozioł (1931–2025, Poland, p/d/f)
- Farooq Kperogi (born 1973, Nigeria, nf)
- Tété-Michel Kpomassie (born 1941, Togo, nf)
- Tim Krabbé (born 1943, Netherlands, f)
- Christian Kracht (born 1966, Switzerland, f/nf)
- Erik P. Kraft (living, US, ch)
- Robert Kraft (1869–1916, Germany, f)
- Thomas Krag (1868–1913, Norway, f/d)
- Vilhelm Krag (1871–1933, Norway, p/nf)
- Petr Král (1941–2011, Czechoslovakia/Czech R, f/nf)
- Lado Kralj (1938–2022, Yugoslavia/Slovenia, nf/f)
- Taja Kramberger (born 1970, Yugoslavia, p/nf)
- Miško Kranjec (1908–1983, Austrian E/Yugoslavia, f)
- Judith Krantz (1928–2019, US, f/nf)
- Ignacy Krasicki (1735–1801, Germany, p/d/nf)
- Zygmunt Krasiński (1812–1859, France, p/d)
- Ivan Krasko (1876–1958, Hungary/Czechoslovakia, p/nf)
- Zlatko Krasni (1951–2008, Yugoslavia/Serbia, p)
- Krastyo Krastev (1866–1919, Ottoman E/Bulgaria, nf)
- Józef Ignacy Kraszewski (1812–1887, Duchy of Warsaw/Switzerland, f/nf)
- László Krasznahorkai (born 1954, Hungary, f/d)
- Karl Kraus (1874–1936, Austrian E/Austria, nf/d/p)
- Rudi Krausmann (1933–2019, Austria/Australia, d/p)
- Ruth Krauss (1901–1993, US, ch/p)
- Helmut Krausser (born 1964, Germany, f/p/d)
- Krayem Awad (born 1948, Syria/Austria, p)
- Štefan Krčméry (1892–1955, Hungary/Czechoslovakia, p/nf)
- Peter Kreeft (born 1937, US, nf)
- Carolyn Kreiter-Foronda (born 1946, US, p)
- Esther Kreitman (1891–1954, Russian E/England, f)
- Jayne Ann Krentz (born 1948, US, f), also as Amanda Quick and Jayne Castle
- Katarzyna Krenz (born 1953, Poland, f/p/nf)
- Maruša Krese (1947–2013, Yugoslavia/Slovenia, p/f)
- Adrienne Kress (living, Canada, f/ch/nf)
- Nancy Kress (born 1948, US, f)
- Michelle de Kretser (born 1957, Ceylon/Australia, f)
- Vincas Krėvė-Mickevičius (1882–1954, Russian E/Soviet Union, p/f/d)
- Jean Krier (1949–2013, Luxembourg, p)
- Léon Krier (born 1946, Luxembourg, nf)
- Uma Krishnaswami (born 1956, India, ch)
- Giles Kristian (born 1975, England, f)
- Kristian Kristiansen (1909–1980, f/d/ch)
- Tomm Kristiansen (born 1950, Norway, nf)
- Ilmur Kristjánsdóttir (born 1978, Iceland, d)
- Jónas Kristjánsson (1924–2014, Iceland, nf/f)
- Snorri Hergill Kristjánsson (born 1974, Iceland/Scotland, f)
- Gerður Kristný (born 1970, Iceland, p/f/ch)
- Ágota Kristóf (1935–2011, Hungary/Switzerland, p/d/f)
- Sara Kristoffersson (born 1972, Sweden, nf)
- Susan Krinard (living, US, f)
- Risto Krle (1900–1975, Ottoman E/Yugoslavia, d)
- Miroslav Krleža (1893–1981, Austria-Hungary/Yugoslavia, p/f/d)
- Vesna Krmpotić (1932–2018, Yugoslavia/Croatia, f/nf)
- Franz Xaver Kroetz (born 1946, Germany, d/nf)
- Antjie Krog (born 1952, S Africa, p/ch/nf)
- Helge Krog (1889–1962, Norway, nf/d)
- Niklas Krog (born 1965, Sweden, f/ch)
- Christian Krohg (1852–1925, Norway, nf)
- Zundel Kroizer (1924–2014, Palestine/Israel, nf)
- Inge Krokann (1893–1962, Norway, f)
- Gerrit Krol (1934–2013, Netherlands, f/nf/p)
- Piet J. Kroonenberg (1927–2016, Netherlands, nf)
- Jarrett J. Krosoczka (born 1977, US, ch)
- Jaan Kross (1920–2007, USSR/Estonia, f)
- Zdravko Krstanović (born 1950, Yugoslavia/Serbia, p/d/f)
- Gyula Krúdy (1878–1933, Hungary, f/nf)
- William Kent Krueger (born 1950, US, f)
- Erwin Krüger (1915–1973, Nicaragua, p)
- Joseph Krumgold (1908–1980, US, f/nf/ch)
- Friedrich Adolf Krummacher (1767–1845, Germany, nf/p)
- Józef Krupiński (1930–1998, Poland, p)
- Edwin C. Krupp (born 1944, US, nf)
- Max Kruse (1921–2015, Germany, ch)
- Agnes von Krusenstjerna (1894–1940, Sweden, f/nf)
- Christina Krüsi (born 1968, Switzerland, nf)
- James Krüss (1926–1997, Germany/Spain, ch/d)
- Ryszard Krynicki (born 1943, Austria, p)
- Marilyn Krysl (born 1942, US, f/p)
- Sigizmund Krzhizhanovsky (1887–1950, Russian E/Soviet Union, f/nf)
- Andrzej Krzycki (1482–1537, Poland, p/nf)
- Ramesh Kshitij (born 1969, Nepal, p/f)
- Driss Ksikes (born 1968, Morocco, nf)

== Ku–Ky ==
- Alfred Kubin (1877–1959, Austrian E/Austria, f)
- Žofia Kubini (fl. 17th c., Hungary), also as Žsofia Kubinyi
- Paweł Kubisz (1907–1968, Poland, p/nf)
- August Kubizek (1888–1956, Austria, nf)
- Mantarō Kubota (久保田万太郎, 1889–1963, Japan, d/f/p)
- Tamara Kučan (born 1989, Yugoslavia/Serbia, f)
- Nahapet Kuchak (died 1592, Armenia, p)
- Adam Kuckhoff (1887–1943, Germany, f/nf)
- Yalçın Küçük (1938–2026, Turkey, nf)
- Péter Kuczka (1923–1999, Hungary, p/f)
- Anatoly Kudryavitsky (born 1954, USSR/Ireland, nf/p)
- Erik von Kuehnelt-Leddihn (1909–1999, Austria-Hungary/Austria, nf)
- Bernhard von Kugler (1837–1898, Germany, nf)
- Franz Theodor Kugler (1808–1858, Germany, nf)
- Julius Kugy (1858–1944, Austrian E/Italy, nf)
- Ken Kuhlken (1945–2024, US, f)
- Johann Kuhnau (1660–1722, Germany, f/nf)
- Gordana Kuić (1942–2023, Yugoslavia/Serbia, f)
- Rifat Kukaj (1938–2005, Yugoslavia/Kosovo, f/p/ch)
- Endre Kukorelly (born 1951, Hungary, nf/f/p)
- Martin Kukučín (1860–1928, Hungary/Czechoslovakia, nf/d)
- Michael Kulikowski (born 1970, US, nf)
- Ayşe Kulin (born 1941, Turkey, f/d)
- Nicholas Kulish (born 1975, US, nf/f)
- Patricia Laurent Kullick (born 1962, Mexico, f)
- Abhay Kumar (born 1980, India, p/nf)
- Masao Kume (久米正雄, 1891–1952, Japan, d/f/p)
- Mojca Kumerdej (born 1964, Yugoslavia/Slovenia, f/nf)
- Maxine Kumin (1925–2014, US, p/f/ch)
- Michael Kumpfmüller (born 1961, Germany, f/nf)
- Maria Kuncewiczowa (1895–1989, Russian E/Poland, f/nf)
- Ludvík Kundera (1920–2010, Czechoslovakia/Czech Republic, f/p)
- Milan Kundera (1929–2023, Czechoslovakia/France, f/p/nf)
- Mazisi Kunene (1930–2006, S Africa, p)
- Ibrahim Kuni (born 1948, Libya/Poland, f)
- Doppo Kunikida (国木田獨歩, 1871–1908, Japan, f/p)
- Stanley Kunitz (1905–2006, US, p)
- Thor Kunkel (born 1963, Germany/Switzerland, f)
- Leo Kunnas (born 1967, USSR/Estonia, f/nf)
- Reiner Kunze (born 1933, Germany, p/nf)
- Richard Kunzmann (born 1976, Namibia/S Africa, f)
- Yanka Kupala (1882–1942, Russian E/USSR, p/d), pseudonym of Ivan Daminikavič Lutsevič
- Tuli Kupferberg (1923–2010, US, p/nf)
- Elisar von Kupffer (1872–1942, Russian E/Germany, p/nf/d), pseudonym Elisarion
- Mwana Kupona (died c. 1865, Pate Sultanate (Kenya), p)
- Yumiko Kurahashi (倉橋由美子, 1935–2005, Japan, f)
- Hyakuzō Kurata (倉田百三, 1891–1943, Japan, nf/d)
- Hanif Kureishi (born 1954, England, d/f)
- Jalu Kurek (1904–1983, Poland, p/nf/f)
- Shushanik Kurghinian (1876–1927, Russian E/USSR)
- Kaoru Kurimoto (栗本薫, 1953–2009, Japan, f/d)
- Kuriyagawa Hakuson (廚川白村, 1880–1923, Japan, nf), pseudonym of Kuriyagawa Tatsuo
- Andrey Kurkov (born 1961, USSR/Ukraine, f/d/ch)
- Lynn Kurland (living, US, f)
- Momoko Kuroda (黒田杏子, 1938–2023, Japan, p/nf)
- Kuroda Seiki (黒田清輝, 1866–1924, Japan, nf)
- Ken Kuronuma (黒沼健), 1902–1985, Japan, f)
- Denji Kuroshima (黒島伝治, 1898–1943, Japan, f)
- Seyhan Kurt (born 1971, France, f)
- Jane Kurtz (born 1952, US, ch/nf)
- Katherine Kurtz (born 1944, US, f)
- Koshi Kurumizawa (胡桃沢耕史, 1925–1994, Japan, f)
- Hermann Kurz (1813–1873, Germany, p/f)
- Isolde Kurz (1853–1944, Germany, p/f)
- Mira Kuś (born 1958, Poland, p)
- Kurt Kusenberg (1904–1983, Sweden/Germany, f)
- Burhanuddin Kushkaki (1894–1953, Afghanistan, nf)
- Rachel Kushner (born 1968, US, f/nf)
- Abdi Kusow (living, Somalia/US, nf)
- Onat Kutlar (1936–1995, Turkey, p/f/d)
- Henry Kuttner (1915–1958, US, f)
- Stephen Kuusisto (born 1955, US, p/nf)
- Kuvempu (1904–1994, India, p/d/f), pseudonym of Kuppali Venkatappa Puttappa
- Eric de Kuyper (born 1942, Belgium/Netherlands, f)
- Ellen Kuzwayo (1914–2006, S Africa, nf)
- Einar Hjörleifsson Kvaran (1859–1938, Iceland, f/p/d)
- Einar Ragnarsson Kvaran (1920–2012, Iceland/US, nf)
- Zofka Kveder (1878–1926, Yugoslavia/Slovenia, f/d)
- Nestan Kvinikadze (born 1980, USSR/Georgia, d/f)
- Benjamin Kwakye (born 1967, Ghana, f)
- Phoe Kyar (1891–1942, Burma, f/nf/ch)
- James Hla Kyaw (1866–1919, Burma, f)
- Henry Kyemba (1939–2023, Uganda, nf)
- Morris Kyffin (c. 1555–1598, Wales, p)
- Susan S. Kyle (born 1946, US, f), also as Diana Palmer
- Natsuhiko Kyōgoku (京極夏彦, born 1963, Japan, f)
- Francis Kynaston (1587–1642, England, p)
- Kyokutei Bakin (曲亭馬琴, 1767–1848, Japan, f/p)
- Goretti Kyomuhendo (born 1965, Uganda/England, f)
- Kyoshi Takahama (高浜虚子, 1874–1959, Japan, p)
- Willy Kyrklund (1921–2009, Finland/Sweden, f/nf)
- Myoma Myint Kywe (born 1960, Burma/Myanmar, nf)
