= Korn (surname) =

Korn is a German surname of Jewish origin. Notable people with the surname include:

- Alejandro Korn (1860–1936), Argentine physician, psychiatrist, philosopher and politician
- Arthur Korn (1870–1945), German physicist, mathematician and inventor
- Arthur Korn (architect) (1891–1978), German architect and urban planner
- David Korn (computer scientist) (born 1943), American computer scientist
- David A. Korn (1930–2022), American diplomat and writer
- Dieter Korn (born 1958), German paleontologist
- Fadumo Korn (born 1964), Somali-born German activist
- Jim Korn (born 1957), American ice hockey player
- Jiří Korn (born 1949), Czech singer-songwriter
- M. F. Korn, American writer
- Marian Korn (1914–1987), Czech-American printmaker
- Theresa Marie Korn (1926–2020), American engineer
- Walter Korn (1908–1997), Czech-born American author of chess books
