= Vim Karénine =

American poet (born 1933)

Vim Karénine (born August 6, 1933) is an American and French poet, a haiku poet and a novelist.

== Biography ==
Vim Karénine (Antony de Vial), son of François de Vial who was a diplomat and a Minister Plenipotentiary of France, was born in Poitiers, France, and grew up in Switzerland, Hungary, and Italy. His family moved afterwards to Canada. After his secondary education at Collège Stanislas (Quebec), in Montreal, Karénine moved to Paris, France. He earned a bachelor's degree from the University of Poitiers Vim published his first poems in a student journal.

He enlisted in the French Navy for two years, and served aboard the cruiser Jeanne d' Arc, visiting the Far East, North and South America, Australia and New Zealand. Antony de Vial graduated from the Carmes Seminary in Paris, to become a Catholic priest on December 17, 1966. He then moved to the United States, involving himself with A. I. M. groups. He was a resident in Silver Spring, Maryland, near Washington D.C. and Baltimore, and acquired U. S. citizenship.

Karénine usually writes his poems on a computer, but if inspiration strikes him when he's away from it, "I've been known to start poems on napkins and scraps of paper, too". He is known for his spontaneous method of writing, covering topics such as Catholic spirituality and travel. In August 2012, his comprehensive collection of Emily Dickinson translations was published by Editions Orizons in France, with a general introduction by poet and editor Guy Chambelland. He eventually retired to Paris.

== Bibliography ==
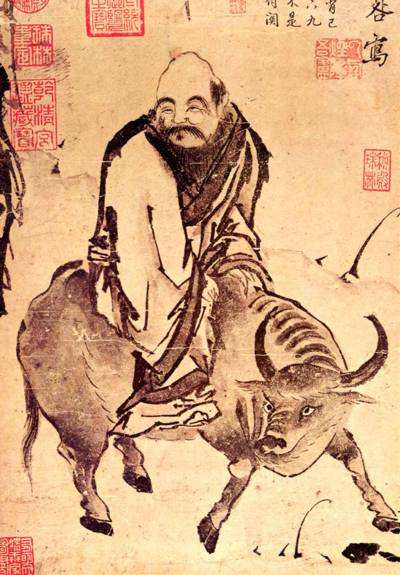
Laozi

- Ricercari 1971 Chambellan Edition PARIS 1971
- The Wall American Edition, translation by Louis Olivier PDE Editions 1976
- La fête à Caïn, Spanish translation by A.M. Diaz et F. Moreno PDE Editions Paris 1978
- Brookling, Poetry revue -USA Vol. II, N°4 1979
- O America ! BB Editions 1991
- O America Book translated by Louis Oliver. MLTA 04144, Ghelderode Editions
- Shoals of Nebraska GC3 Kenneth White LTS Editions Geneva 1994
- "M" In folio BC Editions 1996
- Versant Nord (1997), novel
- The Work of Poetry (1997) criticism
- Récit d'une enfance américaine Paris L'Harmattan editions Paris 2001
- Oasis New-York L'Harmattan, Editions Paris2001
- Haïkus L'Harmattan, Editions Paris 2001
- NEW YORK.9/11 L'Harmattan, Editions 2001
- Orizons Orizons Editions 2009
- Emily Dickinson Translated Poems Vim Karénine Orizons Editions Paris 2012
- Americadire poems Éditions Orizons 2014
- Tao te king French rewriting : Antoine de Vial Orizons 2014

== See also ==
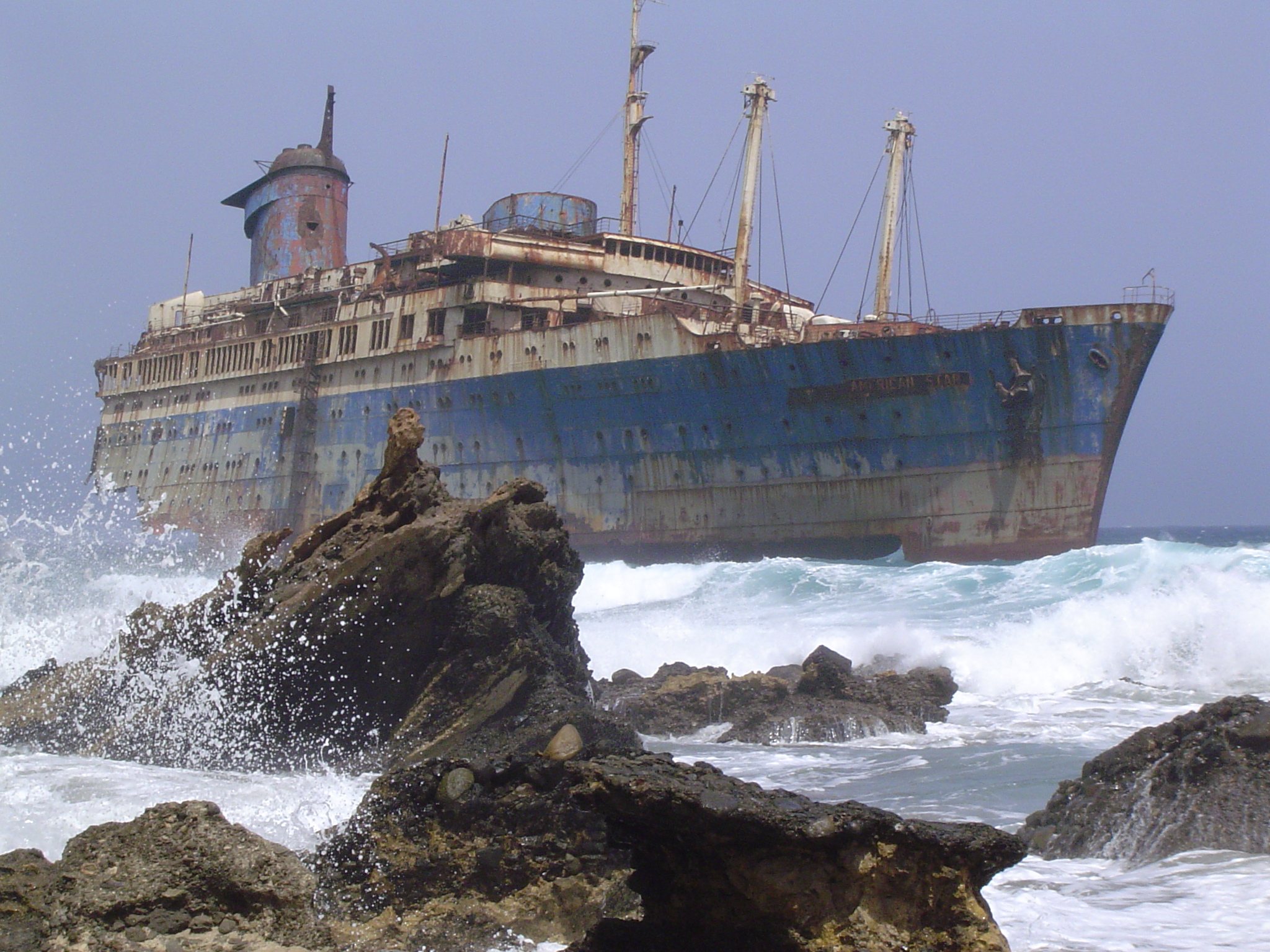
The rogue Wreck

- François de Vial
- Château Lynch-Bages
- List of poets from the United States
- Tao Te Ching

== Notes ==
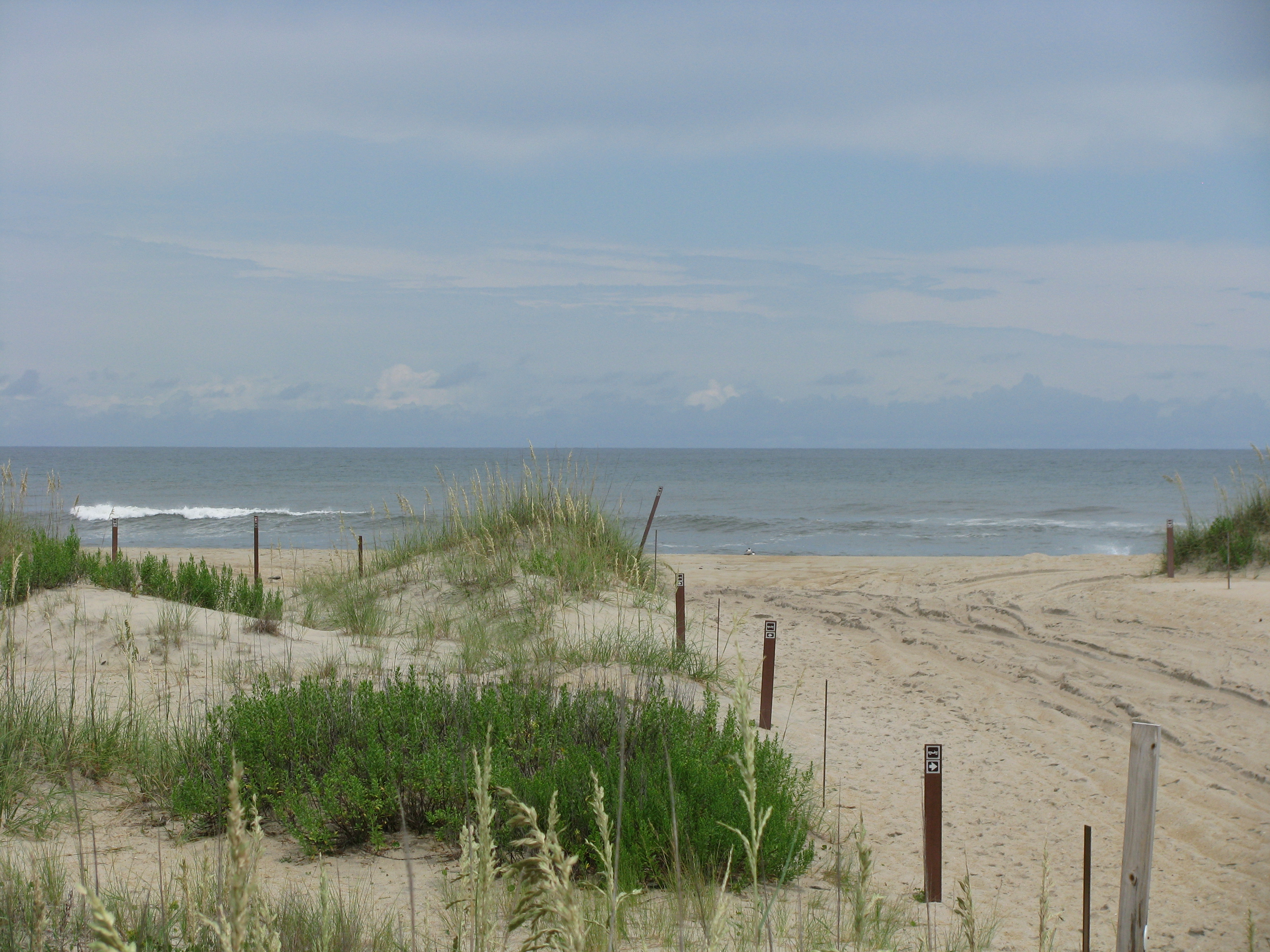
Cape Hatteras

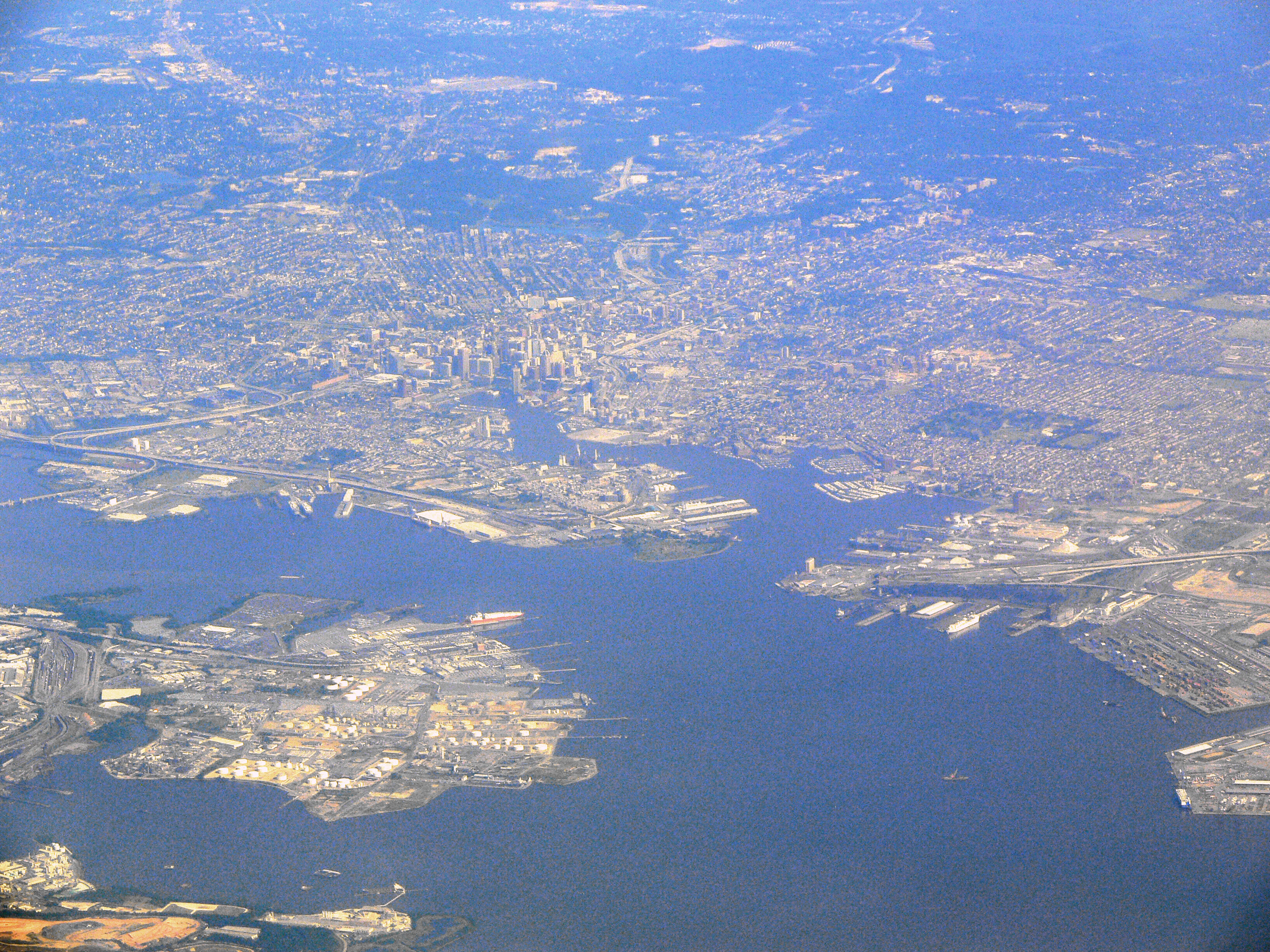
Baltimore

- The Baltimore Sun : 1976 Vim karenine and modern poetry
- Antoine de Vial:
- Antoine de Vial as Vim Mark Karenine
- Emma Jones (2004) The Literary Companion Robson, 2004.
- Keillor, Garrison. Writer's Almanac. March 6, 1998
- BBC interview 1977: V.K. as a novel writer: "Everything comes from something else; you give it your spin. You couldn't not give it your spin."
- Phil Daoust (2 December 1989). "Radio pick of the day: Karenine and the haiku shore" guardian.co.uk. Retrieved 1989-12-12
- Raul Diaz Vial El lignage de Vial Editiones Graphicas Madrid
- Journal de Genève "L'oeuvre originale et les essais de V.M. Karenine" 1981
- French Institute-Alliance Française de New York. - 1987 - Literary Criticism
- "Vim Karenine": Oasis New-York," French Review, LI, no. 6 (May 1978), 916. BooksDocument utilisé pour la rédaction de l'article.
- Vim Karenine translated by Louis Olvier. MLTA 04144 livre, Ghelderode : présentation, choix de textes, chronologie, bibliographie. Par Roland Beyen…
- O America : Vim Karenine (Book, 1991)
- Cavitch, Max, American Elegy: The Poetry of Mourning from the Puritans to Whitman (University of Minnesota Press, 2007). ISBN 978-0-8166-4893-1. Document utilisé pour la rédaction de l'article.
- Hoover, Paul (ed): Postmodern American Poetry - A Norton Anthology (1994). ISBN 0-393-31090-6
- Rutherford, Mildred. American Authors. Atlanta: The Franklin Printing and Publishing Co., 1902

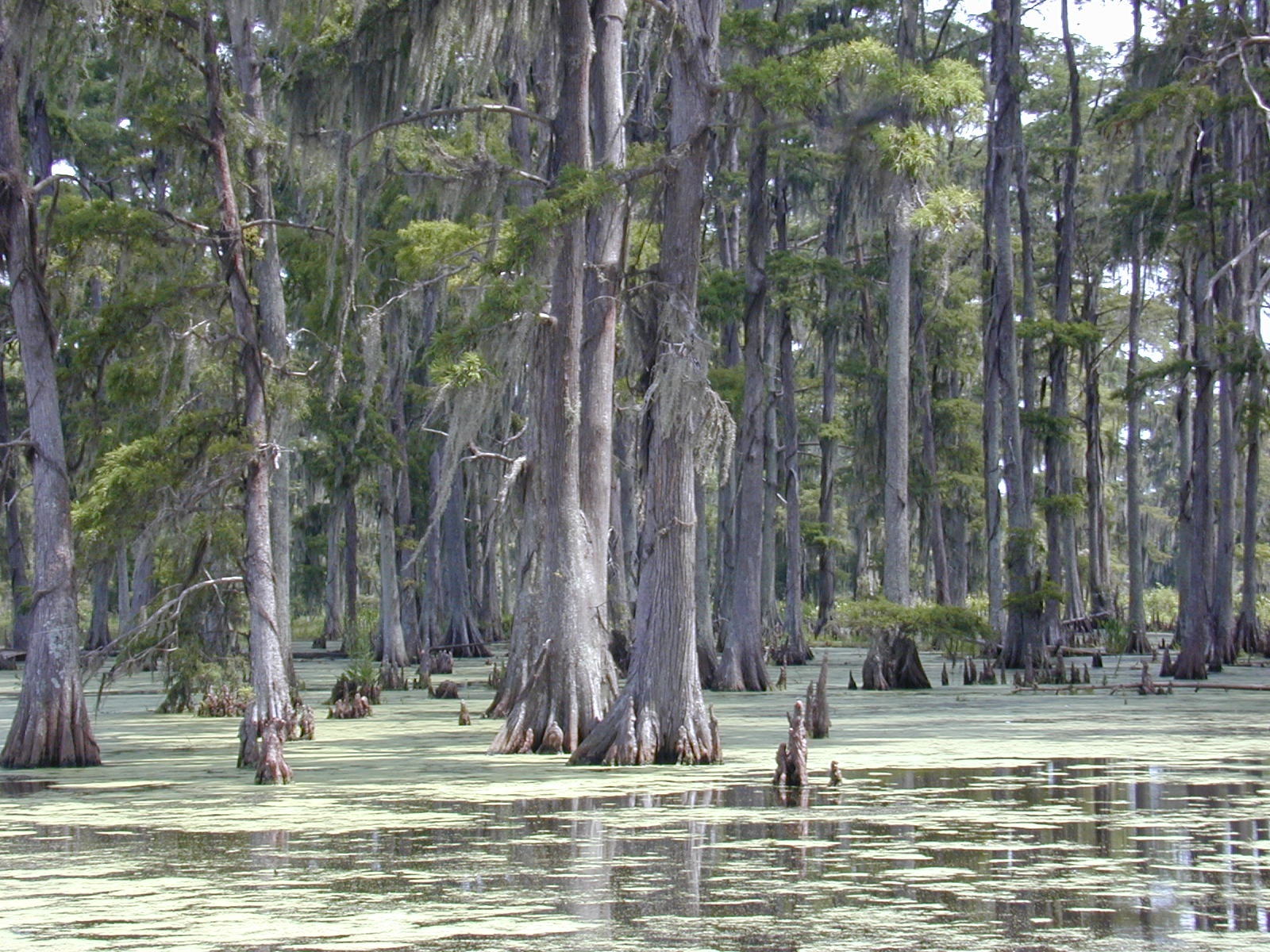
l "cotton mouth swamps"

- Hoover, Paul (editor): Postmodern American Poetry - A Norton Anthology (1994). ISBN 0-393-31090-6
- Moore, Geoffrey (ed): The Penguin Book of American Verse (Revised edition 1983) ISBN 0-14-042313-3
- Mary Oliver
- Winter Hours: Prose, Prose Poems, and Poems (1999)
- Owls and Other Fantasies: poems and essays (2003)
- Why I Wake Early: New Poems (2004)
- Gertrude Stein Stanzas in meditation and Other Poems (1929–1933), New Haven, Yale University Press, 1956.
- Walt Whitman Echantillons de jours et recueils (1882–1883)
- Arna Bontemps 1948 The Poetry of the Negro, 1746-1949: an anthology, edited by Langston Hughes and Arna Bontemps, (Garden City, NY: Doubleday, 1949)
- Virginia Woolf The Moment and Other Essays (1948)
- Virginia Woolf Journal d'un écrivain (1953), extraits du Journal de l'auteur.
- Virginia Woolf L'art du roman (1962)
- Virginia Woolf Instants de vie (Moments of Being) (1976)
- Virginia Woolf Correspondence 1923–1941, avec Vita Sackville-West (2010)
- John Lehmann, Virginia Woolf and Her World (1975)
- Charles Olson The Collected Poems (Berkeley, 1987)
- Vies volées, "Emily Dickinson", de Christian Garcin, Climats, 1999; réédition Flammarion "Étonnants classiques", 2009.

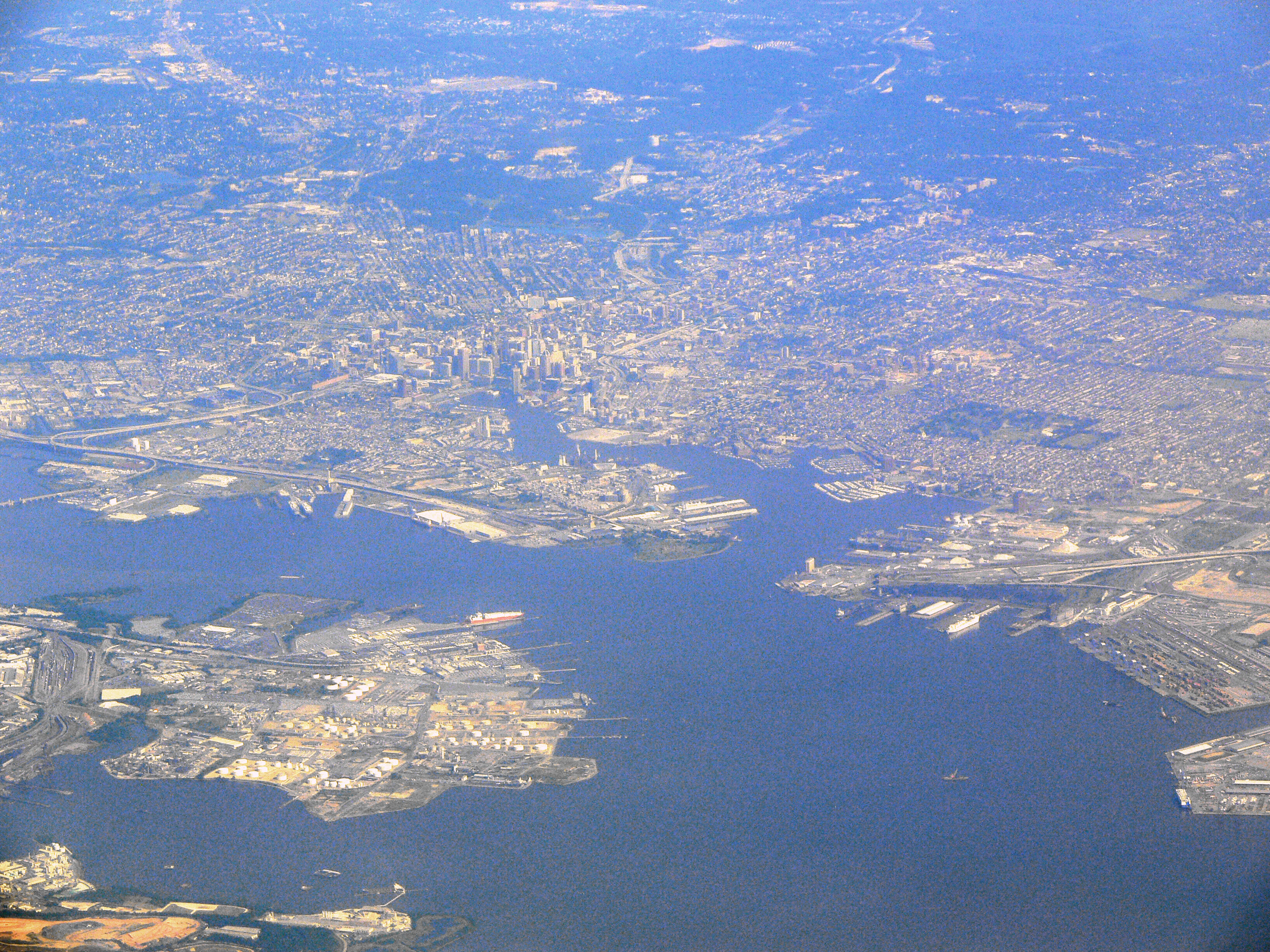
Baltimore

- Bernard Berenson Florentine Painters of the Renaissance (1896) The Bernard Berenson collection of Islamic Painting at Villa i Tatti : Turkman, Uzbek, and Safavid miniatures.
- Bernard Berenson Lorenzo Lotto : An Essay in Constructive Art Criticism (1895)
- *Le Critique d'art, nouvelle de Dino Buzzati de 1969..
- « Nabat », Encyclopedia of Islam, volume VII.
- (en) Stephan G. Schmid; « The Nabataeans. Travellers between Lifestyles », dans B. MacDonald - R. Adams - P. Bienkowski (éd.), The Archaeology of Jordan; Sheffield, 2001; pages 367–426. (ISBN 1841271365)
- Oren, Eliezer D., ed. 2000. The Sea Peoples and Their World: A Reassessment. University Museum Monograph 108. Philadelphia: The University of Pennsylvania Museum of Archaeology and Anthropology
- Schiffman Lawrence, Encyclopedia of the Dead Sea Scrolls, 2 vols. (New York: Oxford University Press, 2000)(with James C. VanderKam (eds.)
- Pierre Grelot, Les juifs dans l'Évangile de Jean. Enquête historique et réflexion théologique, Gabalda et Cie, 1995
- Vim karenine biography Milestone Editions 1999
