= Burhanuddin Kushkaki =

Burhanuddin Kushkaki (Persian: برهان الدين كشككى - Burhān al-Dīn Kushkakī), also known as Mawlawi Borhan al-Din Khan Koshkaki, (1894–1953) was an Afghan writer, journalist and Islamic scholar.

Kushkaki was born in 1894 in Kushkak in Nangarhar Province. He worked primarily as an editor and journalist, working as the editor or director of a number of Afghan newspapers, including Ittihad-i Mashriqi (Eastern Union) in Jalalabad, Aman-i Afghan (Afghan Peace), Habib-ul Islam (Friend of Islam), and Islah (Reconstruction) in Kabul. He was the editor of Rahnama-yi Qataghan wa Badakhshan, a guide to Qataghan-Badakhshan Province that was based on his through the province along with the future King of Afghanistan, Mohammed Nadir Shah. Kushkaki also wrote Nadir-i Afghan and contributed to Shiʻr al-ʻajam as̲ar-i ʻulāmah-ʼi marḥūm Shiblī Nuʻmānī. In addition to his secular work, Kushkaki translated the Koran into Pashtu.

He died in 1953.

== List of publications ==
- Rāhnamā-yi Qaṭaghan va Badakhshān. Kabul: Vizarat-i Ḥarbiyah, 1923.
- Shibli Numani, Muhammad. Shiʻr al-ʻajam as̲ar-i ʻulāmah-ʼi marḥūm Shiblī Nuʻmānī. Lahore: Maṭbaʻ Mufīd-i ʻĀmm, 1927 or 1928. Kushkaki contributed to the book, along with Fayz Muhammad Khan and Shīr Muḥammad Khan.
- Nādir-i Afghān muʼallif-i Burhān al-Dīn Kushkakī. Kabul: Maṭba-i Sangi-yi Riyasat-i Umumi, 1931
