= Fatemeh Khavari =

Afghan activist (born 2000)

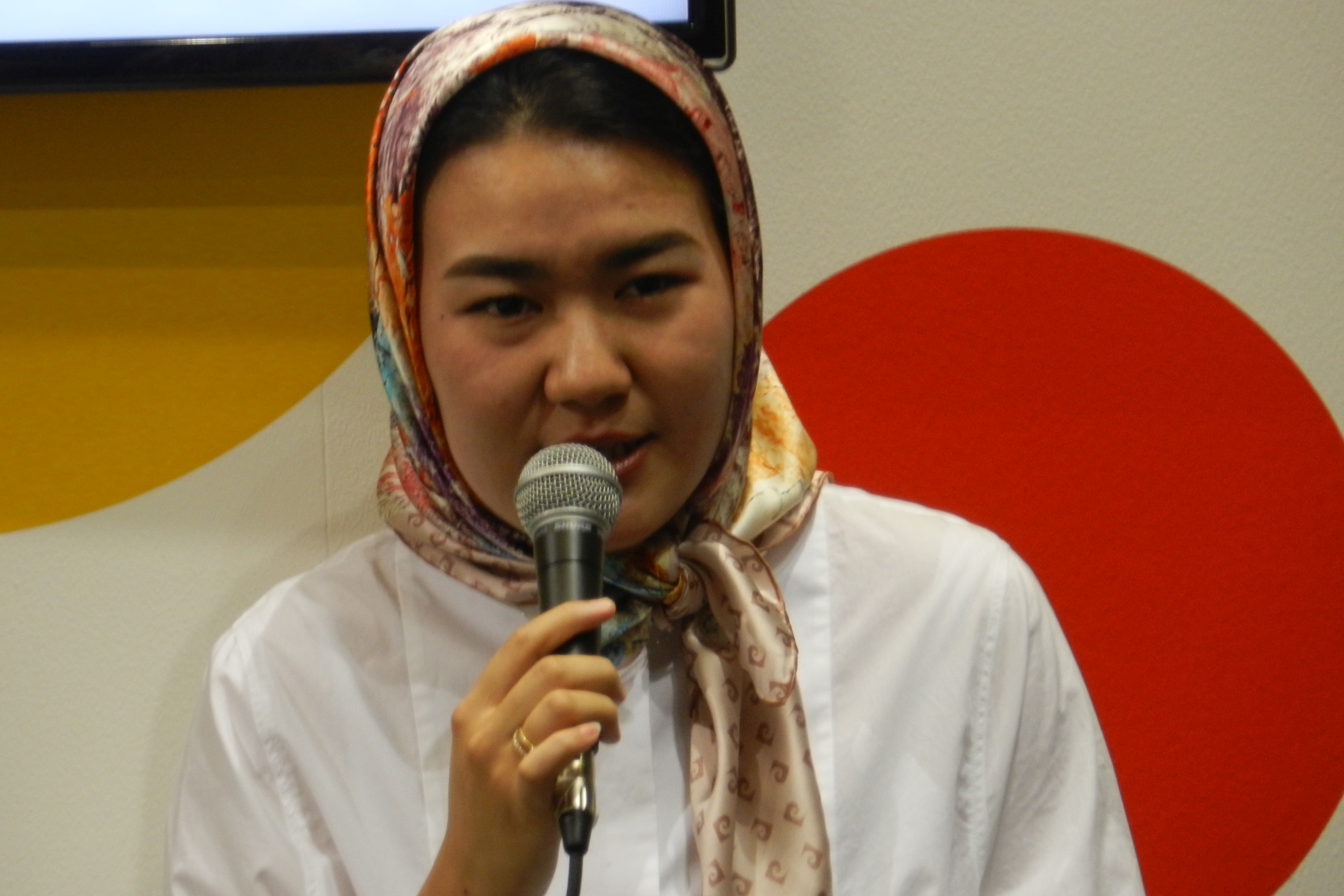
- Fatemeh Khavari in 2018
- Born: 26 January 2000 (age 26); Teheran, Iran

Fatemeh Khavari (born 26 January 2000) is an Iranian-born activist who focuses on Afghan refugees. She arrived in Sweden in 2015.

== Biography ==
Khavari came to Sweden from Teheran, Iran, with her mother and siblings in 2015 as a family reunion as her older brother was living in the country. She is part of the hazaras.

Khavari and some friends founded the organisation Ung i Sverige; they received attention after a sitdown strike in 2017 in support of Afghan refugees and them not being deported back to Afghanistan.

Khavari became the groups spokesperson, and the strike lasted for 58 days between 6 August to 2 October 2017.

In 2018, her book Jag stannar till slutet was published. In 2023, she presented her own episode of Sommar i P1 at Sveriges Radio telling about her life and work.

== Bibliography ==
- Khavari, Fatemeh; Hellquist, Annie (2018). Jag stannar till slutet. Stockholm: Norstedts. ISBN 978-9113086965
