= François de Vial =

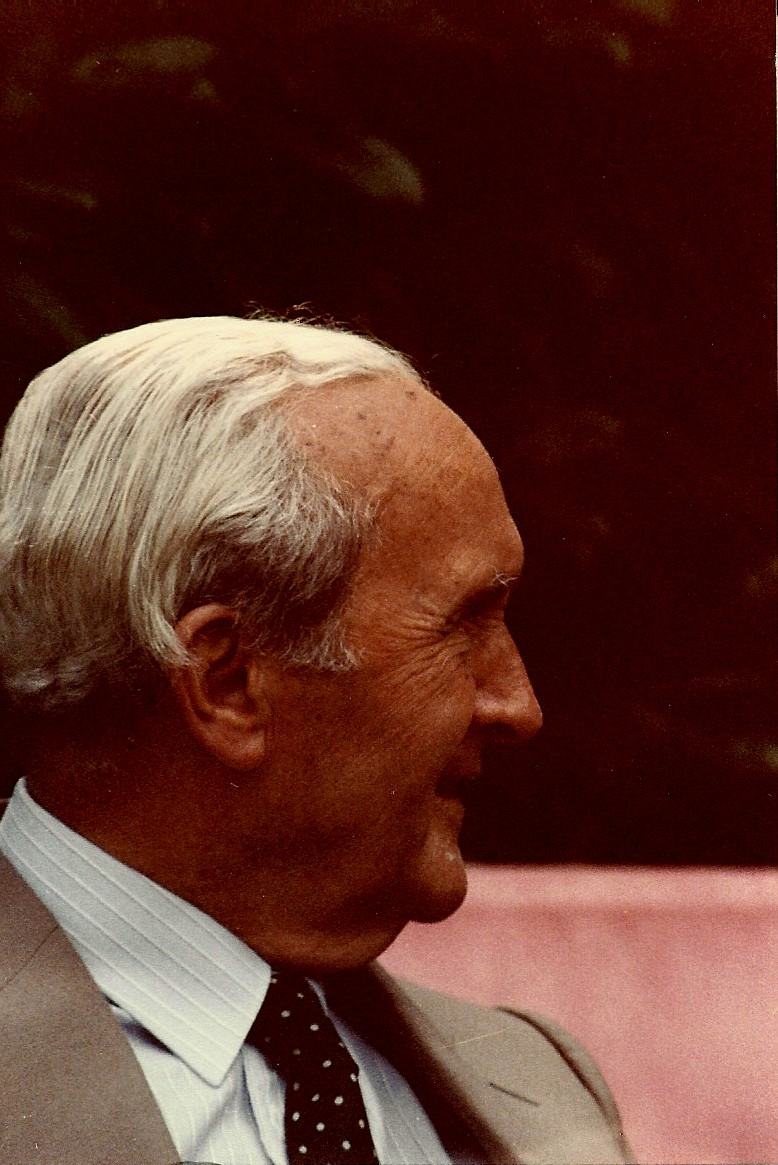
Francois de Vial

François de Vial (French pronunciation: [fʁɑ̃swa də vjal]; October 4, 1904 – May 16, 1984) was a diplomat and a Minister Plenipotentiary of France.

== Biography ==
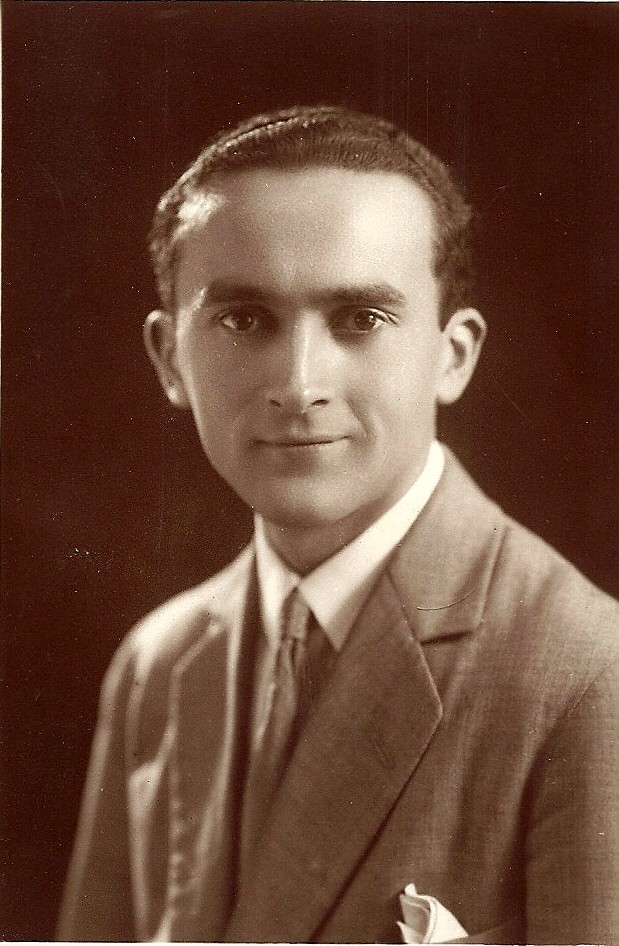
François de Vial Prague 1933

Born at Château Lynch-Bages, Pauillac, he was the son of general Félix de Vial.

=== Education ===
He attended the Lycée Saint-Joseph de Tivoli from 1910 to 1918. He received his BA and law degree in Paris.

=== Diplomatic career ===
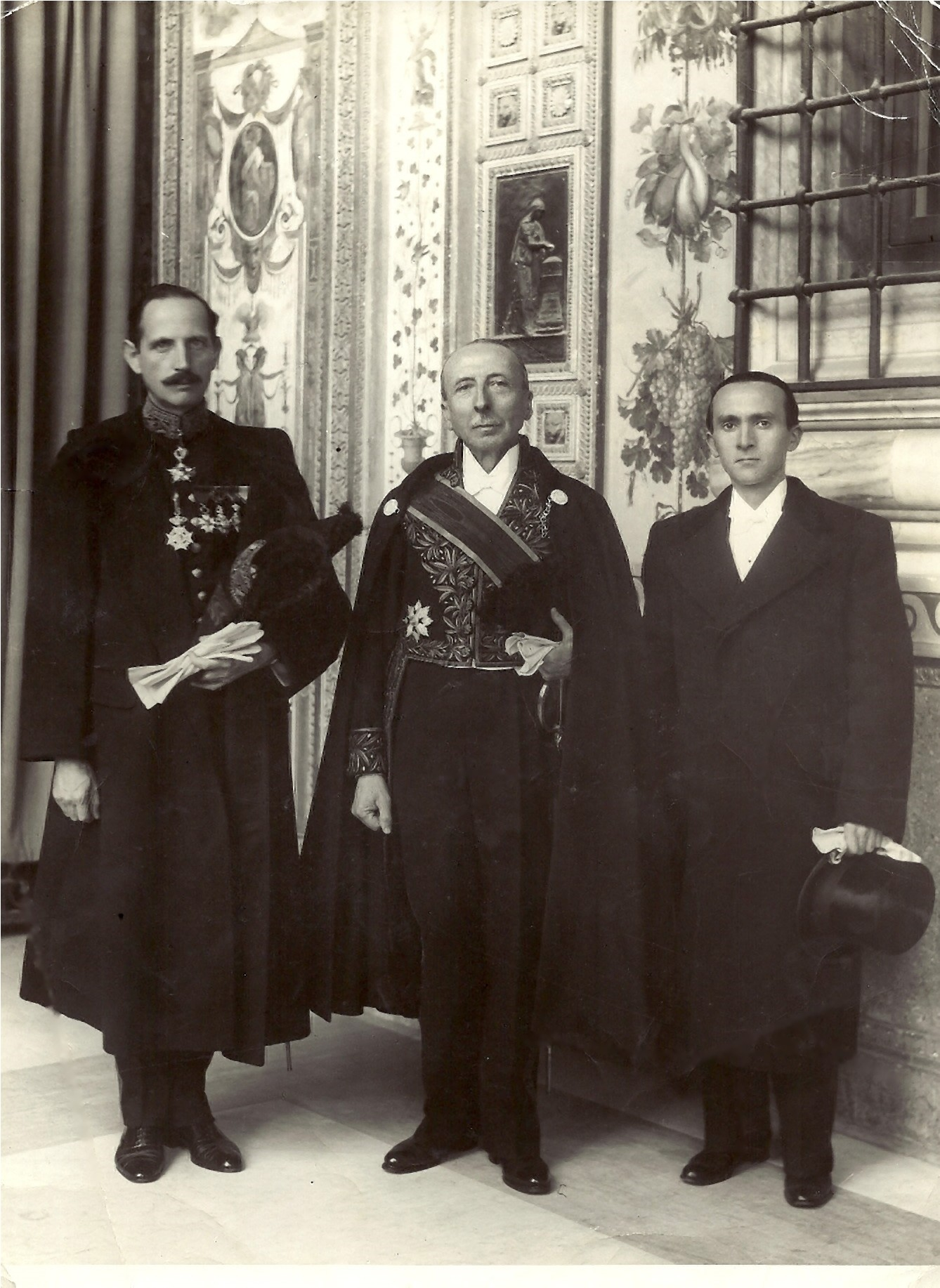
The French Embassy to the Holy See before a state visit to Pope Pius XII

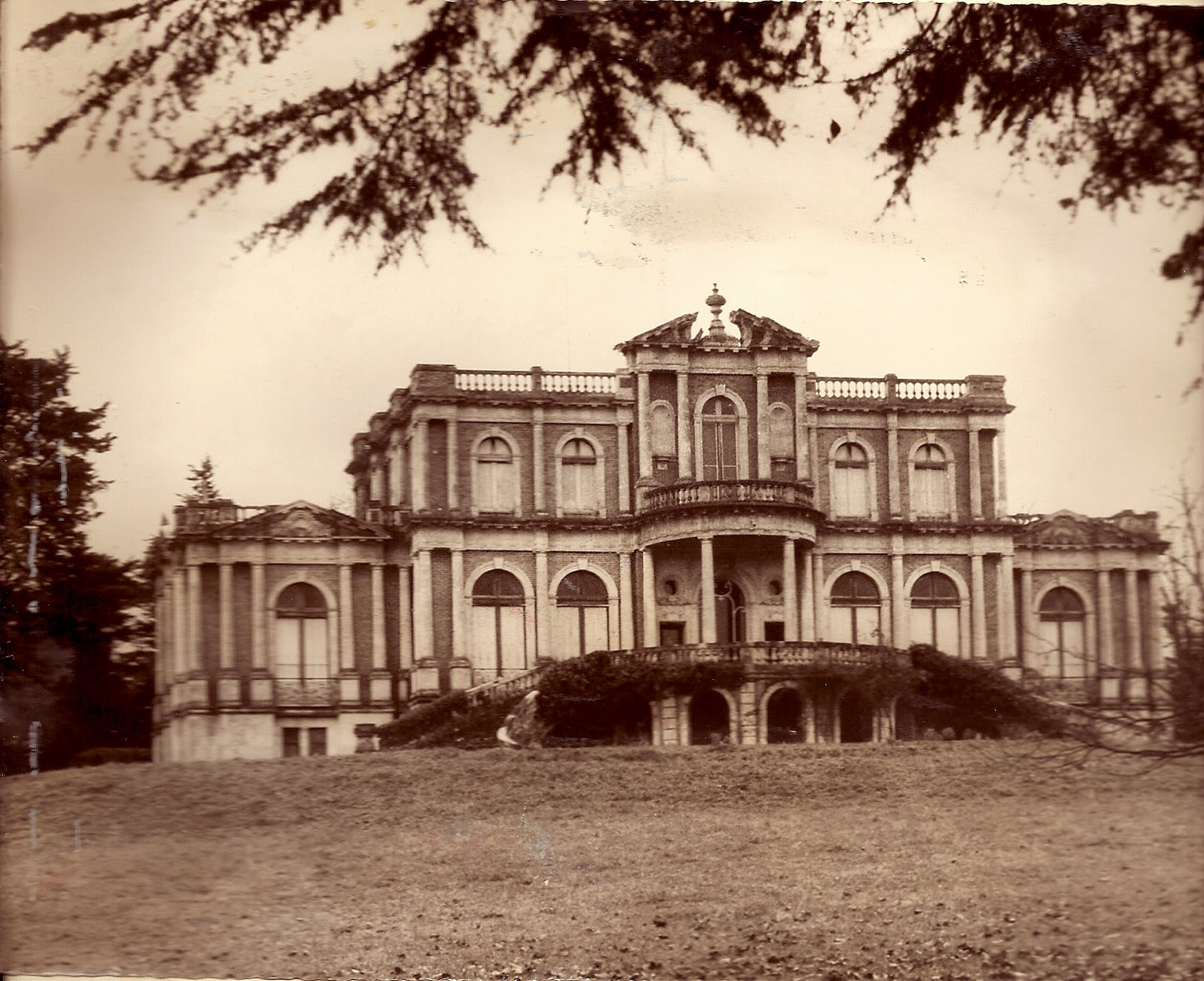
Le Prieuré Castle: his French residence

- Attached to the Consulate of France in Berlin in 1932
- Seconded to the Embassy of France Prague 1933
- Embassy of France in Berne from 1934 to 1935
- Embassy of France in Budapest from 1935 to 1938
- Vice-consul in Naples from 1938 to 1939, he did not join the mobilization center
- Attached to the Embassy of France to the Holy See from 1940 to 1944: Palazzo Taverna Orsini, founded by the Orsini family.

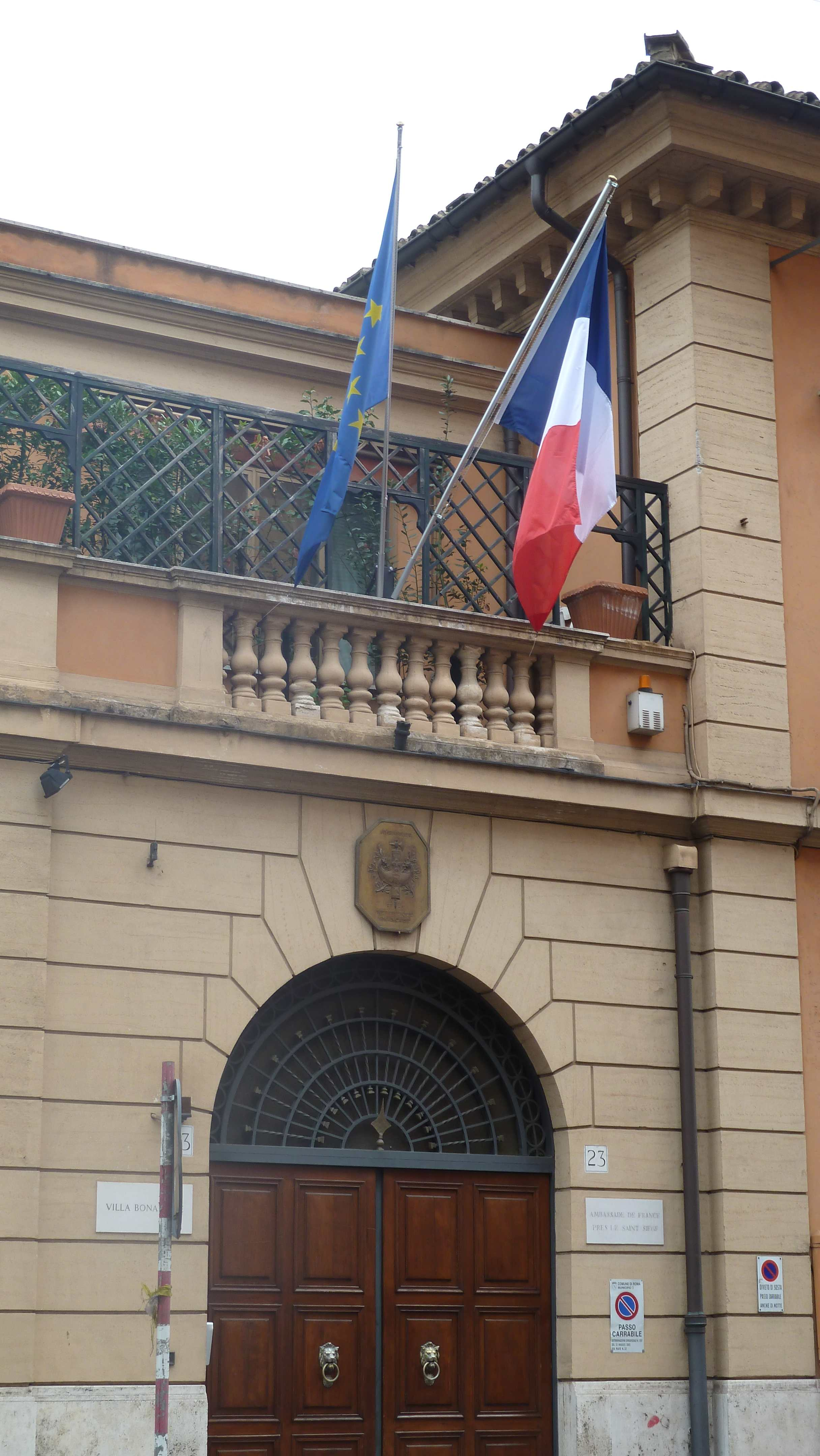
French embassy to the Holy See

- Consul in Firenze from 1944 to 1949

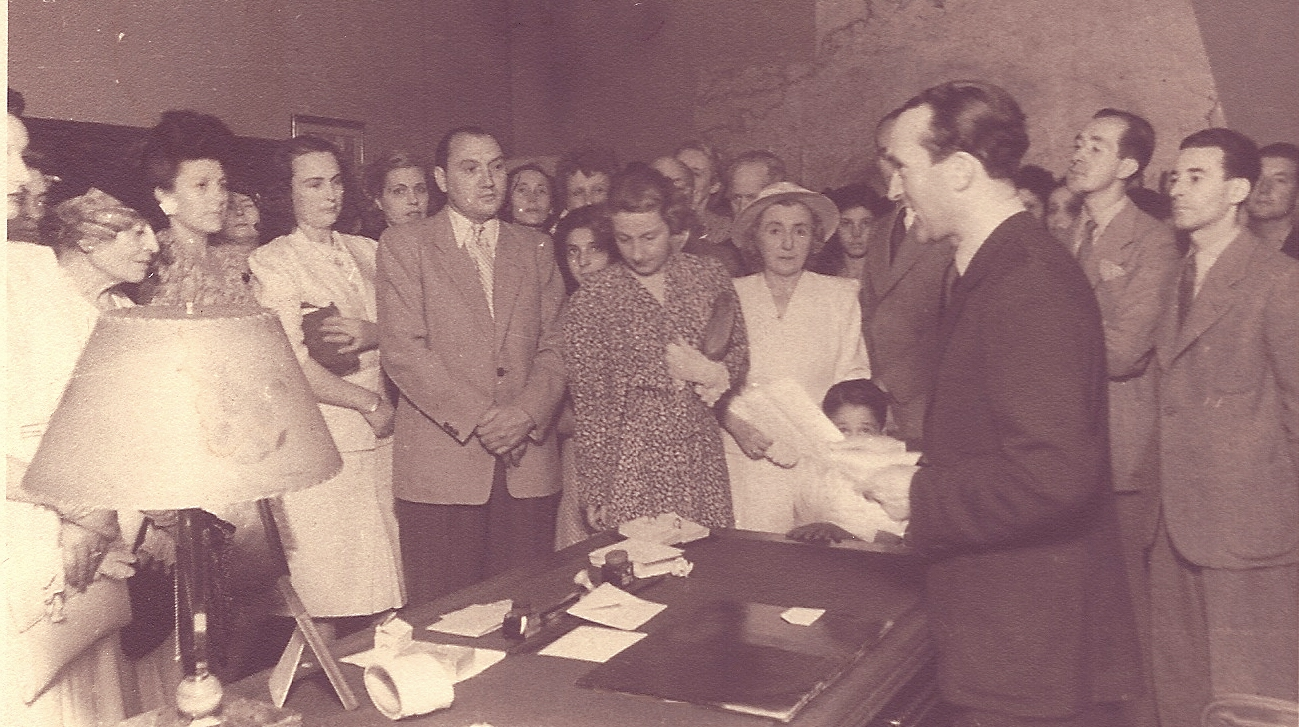
French Patrotic day when in Firenze

- General consul in Quebec from 1953 to 1960
- General consul in Liverpool

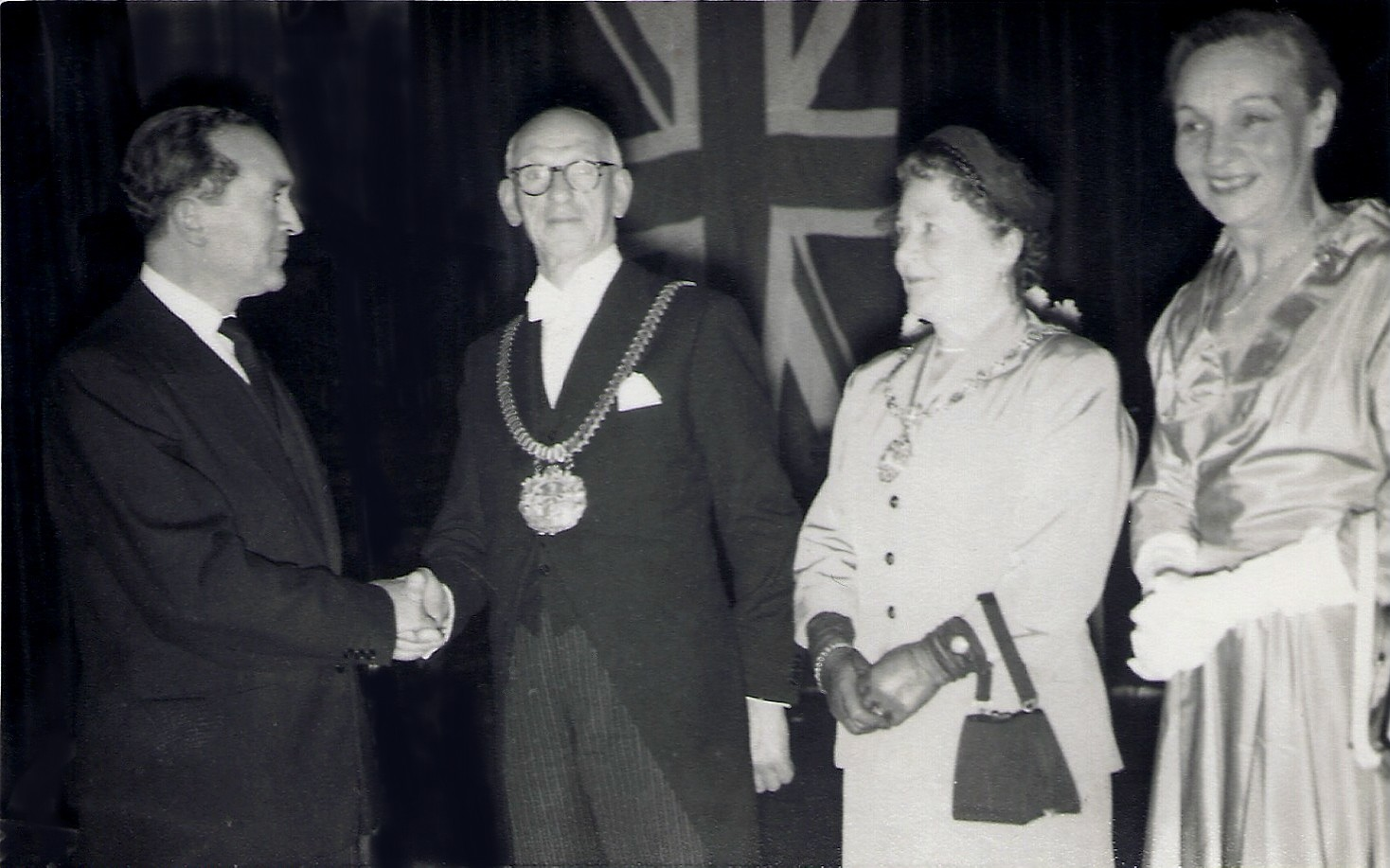
François de Vial meeting with the Lord Mayor

- Plenipotentiary Minister Embassy of France in Madrid
- Member of NATO Defense College
- Plenipotentiary Minister in London

=== Rome Holy See 1942–1944 ===
Sir D'Arcy Osborne, was a British diplomat. He was Envoy Extraordinary and Minister Plenipotentiary to the Holy See 1936–1947. He was one of the group, led by Monsignor Hugh O'Flaherty and a French diplomat François de Vial who both helped conceal some 4,000 escapees, both Allied soldiers and Jews, from the Nazis; 3,925 survived the war.

United Kingdom: Sir Perceval d'Arcy Osborne 12th Duke of Leeds, KCMG (1936–1947) Envoy Extraordinary and Minister Plenipotentiar

United States: Myron Charles Taylor (1939-1950) "Peace Ambassador" and "personal envoy" Myron Charles Taylor

== Distinctions ==
- Righteous Among the Nations 2020

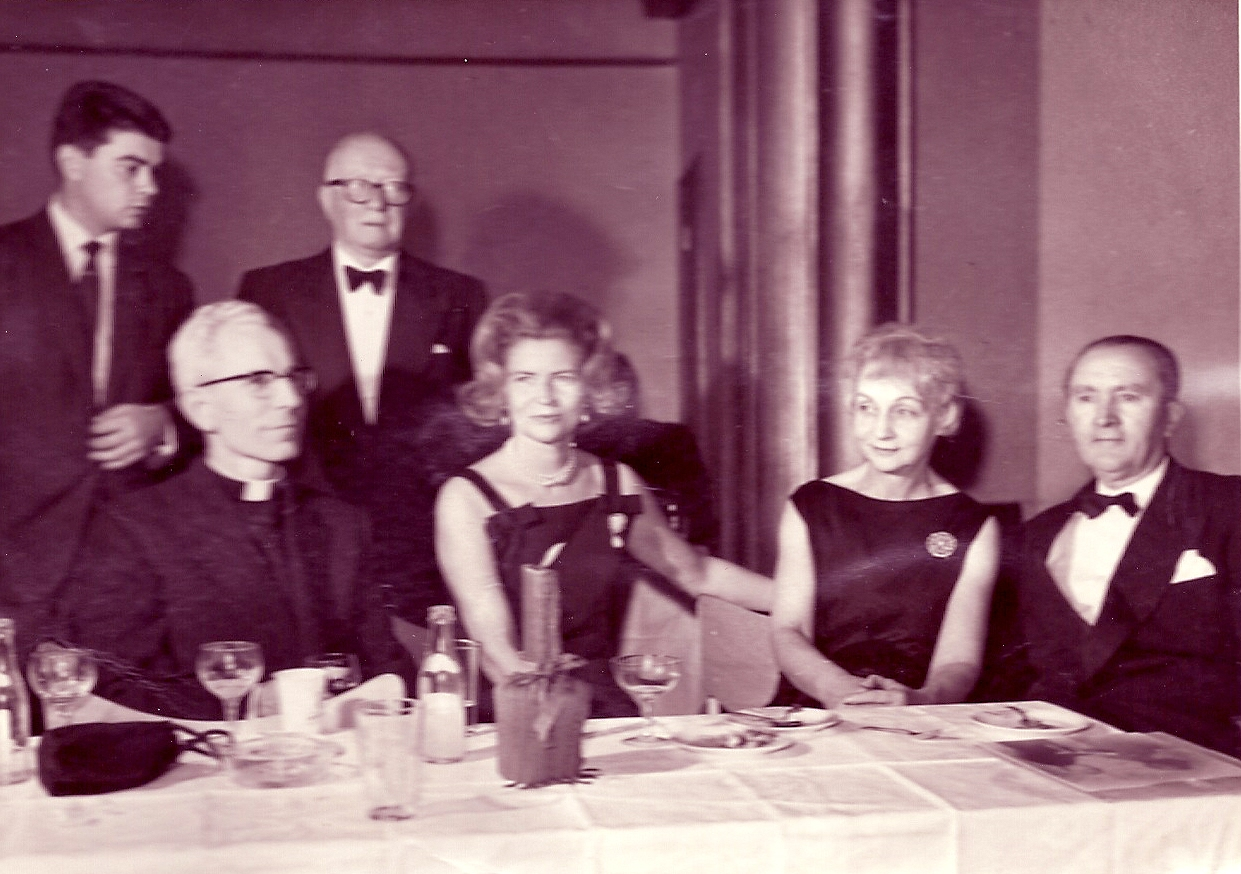
1956 Rev le Craurer, Marchioness de Miramon, Madam de Vial, the French general consul of France François de Vial diplomatic dinner at Savoy hotel

- Officier of the Legion of Honour
- Commander of National Order of Merit (France)
- Médaille de la Résistance
- Order of the British Empire
- Knight of the Order of Merit of the Republic of Hungary

== See also ==
- Legion of Honour
- List of Legion of Honour recipients by name (V)
- Legion of Honour Museum

== Sources ==
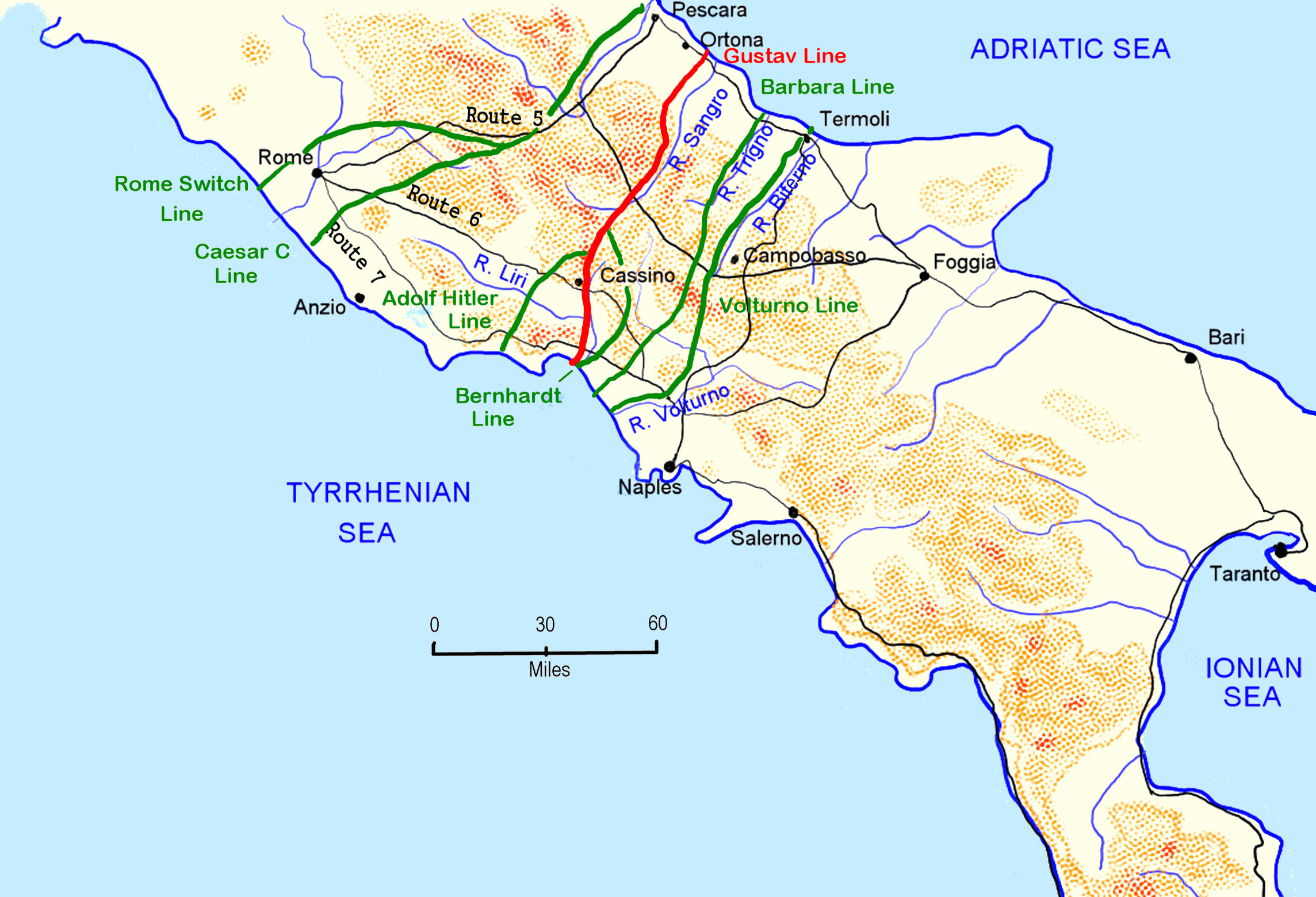
Defense Lines South of Rome 1943

- La Course pour Rome : comment la ville éternelle fut sauvée de la destruction nazie, Dan Kurzman, Éditions Elsevier 1977
- French Diplomatic Diary 1950 Edition, 1968 Edition.
- Chadwick, Owen Britain and the Vatican During the Second World War, 1988, Cambridge University Paperback Library, p. 86 et seq.
- Clark, Mark (2007) [1950]. Calculated Risk. New York: Enigma Books. ISBN 978-1-929631-59-9.
- D'Este, Carlo (1990). World War II in the Mediterranean (1942-1945 Major Battles and Campaigns). Algonquin Books. ISBN 978-0-945575-04-7.
- Ellis, John (1993). The World War II Databook: The Essential Facts and Figures for all the combatants. BCA. ISBN 978-1-85410-254-6.
- French general consuls List in Québec :
- "Réception du docteur L.P. Roy" chronicle from Quebec newspaper "la Patrie"
- Economical links with Québec and federal Government 1953 Page 117, 121, 135: letters written by François de Vial to Maurice Schumann, French Foreign Office minister.
- Moseley, Ray. 2004. Mussolini: The Last 600 Days of Il Duce. Dallas: Taylor Trade Publishing.
- " War souvenirs; Pierre Peteul"
- French Canadian diplomatic relationship : Mac Gill University Montréal. folio 191,192,205,206 "Réactions du Québec à l' américanisation de la culture".
- Atkinson, Rick (2007). The Day of Battle: The War in Sicily and Italy, 1943-1944 (vol. 2 of The Liberation Trilogy). ISBN 978-0-8050-8861-8.
- "Alphonse Juin (1888-1967)" (in French). Académie française. 2009. Archived from the original on 16 February 2009. Retrieved 2009-01-18.
- Tardini, Domenico. 1960. Pio XII. Roma: Poliglotta Vaticana.
- Mgr Martin, le Vatican inconnu, Fayard, 1988
- Jean Neuvecelle, Église, capitale Vatican, coll. L'Air du temps, Paris, Gallimard, 1954,
- Charles Pichon, Le Vatican hier et aujourd'hui, Fayard, 1968
- Paul Poupard, Connaissance du Vatican : histoire, organisation, activité, éd. Beauchesne, 1967, extraits en ligne
- Sergio Romano, La Foi et le Pouvoir : Le Vatican et l'Italie de Pie IX à Benoît XVI, Buchet-Chastel, 2007 Résumé en ligne
- Jean-Jacques Thierry :Andrea Lazzarini, Paolo VI, Profilo di Montini, quoted from Papst Paul VI Herder Freiburg, 1964
- Morris, Terry; Murphy, Derrick. Europe 1870–1991.
- Nicholas Horth, Miklós Horthy, Andrew L. Simon, Nicholas Roosevelt, Admiral Nicholas Horthy Memoirs, Simon Publications LLC, 1957
- Raiber, Richard (2008). Anatomy of Perjury: Field Marshal Albert Kesselring, Via Rasella, and the GINNY mission. Newark: University of Delaware Press. OCLC 171287684.
- Boyle, Peter G., ed. (2005). The Eden–Eisenhower correspondence, 1955–1957 University of North Carolina Press. ISBN 0-8078-2935-8
- Eisenhower, Dwight D. (1948). Crusade in Europe, his war memoirs.
- Clausson, M. I. (2006). NATO: Status, Relations, and Decision-Making. Nova Publishers. ISBN 1-60021-098-8.
- Garthoff, Raymond L. (1994). Détente and confrontation: American-Soviet relations from Nixon to Reagan. Brookings Institution Press. ISBN 0-8157-3041-1.
- Le Blévennec, François (25 October 2011). "The Big Move". NATO Review. Retrieved 19 December 2011.
- a b Cody, Edward (12 March 2009). "After 43 Years, France to Rejoin NATO as Full Member". The Washington Post. Retrieved 19 December 2011.
- (es) Jesús Palacios et Stanley G. Payne, Franco, mi padre : Testimonio de Carmen Franco, hija del caudillo, Madrid, La Esfera de los Libros, 2008, 791 p. ISBN 978-84-9734-783-9
- O'Reilly, Charles T (2001). Forgotten Battles: Italy's War of Liberation, 1943–1945. Lexington Books. p. 244. ISBN 0-7391-0195-1.
- Dalin, David G. The Myth of Hitler's Pope: How Pope Pius XII Rescued Jews from the Nazis. Regnery Publishing: Washington, D.C. 2005; ISBN 0-89526-034-4; p. 76
- Minutes of 7 August 1941. British Public Records Office FO 371/30175
- Cf. The Holy See's official journal Acta Apostolicae Sedis Volume 51, p. 271.
- The Scarlet Pimpernel of the Vatican".
- Stephen Walker (4 March 2011), "The Priest who Outfoxed the Nazis", Irish Times, retrieved 4 March 2011
- "Hugh O'Flaherty Memorial web page". Permanent Memorial. Hugh O'Flaherty Memorial Society. Retrieved February 23, 2013.
- Linteau, Paul-André (1989). Histoire du Québec contemporain; Volume 1; De la Confédération à la crise (1867–1929). Montréal: Les Éditions du Boréal. ISBN 978-2-89052-297-8.
- Linteau, Paul-André (1989). Histoire du Québec contemporain; Volume 2; Le Québec depuis 1930. Montréal: Les Éditions du Boréal. ISBN 978-2-89052-298-5.
- Horthy:, Admiral Nicholas (2000). Admiral Nicholas Horthy Memoirs. Nicholas Horthy, Miklós Horthy, Andrew L. Simon, Nicholas Roosevelt (illustrated ed.). Simon Publications LLC. p. 348. ISBN 0-9665734-3-9.
- 1919 speech of Horthy
- The Battle for Rome: The Germans, The Allies, The Partisans, and The Pope, September 1943-June 1944. New York: Simon and Schuster.
- Portelli, Alessandro (2003). The Order Has Been Carried Out: : History, Memory, and Meaning of a Nazi Massacre in Rome. Macmillan.
- List des consuls généraux français à Québec
- Liens économiques et échanges avec le Québec et le gouvernement fédéral 1953 Pages 117, 121, 135: lettres de François de Vial à Maurice Schumann, ministre des Affaires étrangères.
- Relations France Canada : Archives de l' université .Mac Gill Montréal.
- Strange Allies: Canada-Quebec-France Triangular Relations, 1944-1970
- Park, William (1986). Defending the West: a history of NATO. Westview Press. ISBN 0-8133-0408-3.
- Katz, Robert (2003). The Battle for Rome. Simon & Schuster. ISBN 978-0-7432-1642-5.
- The Peerage : Sir Percy Godolphin Osborne, 11° duc de Leeds.
