= Sarah Kortemeier =

American poet and librarian

- Occupations: Author, librarian
- Writing career
- Genre: Poetry

Sarah Kortemeier is an American poet and librarian. Her book Ganbatte won the Felix Pollak Prize in Poetry in 2019.

== Biography ==
Kortemeier holds a B.A. in English/Creative Writing from the University of Houston, and MFA and MLS degrees from the University of Arizona. Between completing her undergraduate degree and beginning graduate school, Kortemeier lived in Germany for a year, and in Japan for three years. She won the 2016 Miriam Braverman Memorial Prize for her essay, "I'll Drown My Book: Visibility, Gender, and Classification in The University of Arizona Poetry Center Library." As of 2021, Kortemeier works as Library Director of the University of Arizona Poetry Center Library.

Ganbatte, Kortemeier's debut poetry collection, was published by the University of Wisconsin Press in 2019. Naomi Shihab Nye, introducing one of Kortemeier's poems in The New York Times Magazine, described Ganbatte as "mesmerizing."
