= Hilda Katz =

American artist

- Born: 1909; New York City
- Died: 1997 (aged 87–88); New York City

Hilda Katz (1909–1997) was an American painter, printer, and author who went by the pen name Hulda Weber. She was born in the Bronx, NY. She was a scholar at the New School of Social Research in NYC (1940-1941). Her work is included in the collections of the Smithsonian American Art Museum, the Metropolitan Museum of Art, the University Art Museum at University at Albany, the National Gallery of Art, and the Brooklyn Museum.

Hilda Katz went to Italy in the 1970s. She participated in an exhibit Contemporary Figure Artists 20th century, in Italy. This exhibit contained works of Picasso, Miro, Dali, Morandi and others.

Hilda Katz was also an author, publishing her poems in various poetry magazines. Her poetry may be found in the Library of Congress, in the Lina and Max Katz Memorial Collection at the Library of Congress.
