= Raymond A. Knight =

American psychologist (born 1944)

- Born: February 22, 1944 (age 82)
- Occupations: Psychologist and academic

Academic background
- Education: BA., Philosophy; PhD., Clinical Psychology
- Alma mater: Cathedral College of the Immaculate Conception; Hofstra University; University of Minnesota

Academic work
- Institutions: Brandeis University

Raymond A. Knight is a psychologist and academic most known for his research on schizophrenia and on aggressive behavior, particularly sexual aggression, psychopathy, and bullying, exploring their causes, life course, and outcomes, and for developing the Multidimensional Inventory of Development, Sex, and Aggression (MIDSA) that assesses treatment targets for those who have sexually offended. He is a professor emeritus of Human Relations at Brandeis University.

Knight's publications include 130 peer-reviewed journal publications, 48 chapters and reports in the areas of sexual aggression, psychopathy, and schizophrenia. He was named Fellow of the Association for the Treatment of Sexual Abusers in 2016. He has received awards for his work, including the 1997 Louis Dembitz Brandeis Prize for Excellence in Teaching, the 1998 Significant Achievement Award from the Association for the Treatment and Prevention of Sexual Abuse, the 2013 Mentor Award, and the 2018 Joseph Zubin Lifetime Achievement Award from the Society for Research in Psychopathology, as well as the 2018 Theoharis Seghorn Award for Professional Achievement in Preventing Sexual Abuse from the Massachusetts Adolescent Sex Offender Coalition and the Massachusetts Association for the Treatment of Sexual Abusers.

== Education and early career ==
Knight earned a BA in Philosophy from the Cathedral College of the Immaculate Conception in 1966, followed by a year in the Experimental Psychology program at Hofstra University in 1967. He received a PhD in Clinical Psychology from the University of Minnesota in 1973.

== Career ==
Knight joined Brandeis University as an assistant professor of psychology in 1971 and advanced to Professor in 1986. From 1971 to 1985, he also worked at the Brandeis Psychological Counseling Center. Subsequently, he was named Mortimer Gryzmish Professor of Human Relations from 1999 to 2015 and concurrently held the position of the Chair of the Department of Psychology from 2010 to 2011. He has been the professor emeritus of Human Relations at Brandeis University since 2015.

Knight served as President of both the Society for Research in Psychopathology (2001–2002) and the Association for the Treatment and Prevention of Sexual Abuse (2004–2005). He served on the subcommittee on paraphilias for the DSM-III-R (1987), and he was an advisor for the paraphilia sub-workgroup for the DSM-5 (2013). He was appointed to the Governor's Sex Offender Recidivism Commission of Massachusetts, where he advocated for juveniles who had sexually offended to be treated as patients in need of evidence-based treatment rather than as criminals and argued that Massachusetts' methods for assessing and managing those who had sexually offended should be modified so that they were empirically reliable and valid. Since 1999, he has been a member of the executive board of the Massachusetts Association for the Treatment of Sexual Offenders.

== Research ==
Knight has contributed to the field of psychology by studying schizophrenia, sexual coercive behavior, psychopathy, bullying, antisocial personality disorder, and sadism.

=== Classification and etiology of psychopathology ===
Knight started his research looking into the cognitive and affective deficits of individuals with schizophrenia. His work involved both longitudinal studies and experiments to test cognitive and affective theories about schizophrenia. He argued that the process-oriented strategy that he devised to study cognitive deficiencies was the best way to solve the general deficit problem that plagued schizophrenia research. His strategy has remained a core component of subsequent research on the cognition deficiencies in schizophrenia. In 1976, he added the study of sexual aggression to his research interests. He developed and validated typological models for offenders against both adults and children. He later completed a 25-year follow-up of individuals who had been convicted of sexual offending and were released from the Massachusetts Treatment Center.

In a highly cited paper, Knight emphasized the essential role of classification as a basic strategy in scientific investigation, highlighting its importance in advancing scientific knowledge about sexually aggressive behavior. He reviewed evidence to determine the key factors that should be included in models to differentiate rapists from nonrapists, identify rapist subgroups, and improve decisions about offender management. He generated and tested typologies for both rapists and child molesters. Using advanced taxometric analysis, he revealed that psychopathy and its components, as well as hypersexuality and sadism, are dimensionally rather than taxonically distributed among offenders. Additionally, he evaluated the need for identifying more homogeneous subgroups of juvenile sex offenders by assessing two existing typologies for child molesters and rapists on a sample of 564 males who had sexually offended.

Collaborating with Judith Sims-Knight, Knight tested a unified three-path model of sexual aggression against women using structural equation modeling on responses from 168 males, finding it to be superior to Malamuth's two-path model in explaining the etiology of sexual coercion. Their structural equation model has been replicated in both adults and juveniles who have sexually offended.

=== Risk assessment for sexually coercive males ===
Knight investigated the factors associated with risk assessment for sexually coercive males. His research showed that the degree of sexual preoccupation with children, paraphilias, and the number of prior sexual offenses predicted sexual recidivism in individuals who had molested extrafamilial children, whereas antisocial behavior and low child contact predicted other types of recidivism for these offenders. He found that juvenile and adult antisociality, pervasive anger, and offense planning predicted the sexual recidivism of sexual aggressors against women. His work also established that variability in sex offender recidivism rates is influenced by differences in how reoffence is defined and tracked, leading with some definitions to an underestimation of recidivism and affecting forensic, clinical, and policy practices. Moreover, comparing the accuracy of major risk assessment tools for sexual offenders, he identified new predictors and demonstrated that the Structured Risk Assessment (SRA) Needs Assessment was among the best recidivism predictors, with distinct predictive patterns for rapists and child molesters.

=== Multidimensional Inventory of Development, Sex, and Aggression (MIDSA) ===
Knight has worked on validating the Multidimensional Inventory of Development, Sex, and Aggression (the MIDSA), which is a computerized contingency-based inventory that provides a comprehensive assessment for treatment planning of multiple critical areas of adaptation for juveniles and adults who have sexually offended. In addition to his interests in tracking the life course of sexual aggression and identifying both the risk and protective factors that contribute to the recidivism or desistance of such behavior, his research projects include studying the taxometrics of pedophilia, paraphilias, sadism, hypersexuality, and psychopathy. Furthermore, he has been validating the Agonistic Continuum (a dimension that ranges from no coercive fantasies to coercive fantasies and to sadistic behavior), exploring different kinds of hypersexuality and their relation to specific types of impulsivity, creating new metrics for the typologies he has created, and identifying and creating metrics for the core predictive components of sexually aggressive behavior.

== Awards and honors ==
- 1997 – Louis Dembitz Prize for Excellence in Teaching, Brandeis University
- 1998 – Significant Achievement Award, Association for the Treatment of Sexual Abusers
- 2013 – Mentor Award, Society for Research in Psychopathology
- 2018 – Joseph Zubin Lifetime Achievement Award, Society for Research in Psychopathology
- 2018 – Theoharis Seghorn Award, Massachusetts Adolescent Sex Offender Coalition and the Massachusetts Association for the Treatment of Sexual Abusers

== Selected articles ==
- Knight, R. A. (1983). Converging models of cognitive deficit in schizophrenia. In Nebraska symposium on motivation, 1983: Theories of schizophrenia and psychosis (pp. 93–156). Lincoln: University of Nebraska Press.
- Knight, R. A., & Prentky, R. A. (1990). Classifying sexual offenders: The development and corroboration of taxonomic models. In Handbook of sexual assault: Issues, theories, and treatment of the offender (pp. 23–52). Boston, MA: Springer US.
- Prentky, R. A., & Knight, R. A. (1991). Identifying critical dimensions for discriminating among rapists. Journal of consulting and clinical psychology, 59(5), 643–661.
- Knight, R. A., & Prentky, R. A. (1993). Exploring characteristics for classifying juvenile sex offenders. In H. E. Barbaree, W. L. Marshall, & S. M. Hudson (Eds.), The juvenile sex offender (pp. 45–83). Guilford Press.
- Prentky, R. A., Lee, A. F., Knight, R. A., & Cerce, D. (1997). Recidivism rates among child molesters and rapists: A methodological analysis. Law and human behavior, 21, 635–659.
- Guay, J. P., Ruscio, J., Knight, R. A., & Hare, R. D. (2007). A taxometric analysis of the latent structure of psychopathy: evidence for dimensionality. Journal of Abnormal Psychology, 116(4), 701–716.
- Parent, G., Piché, M. È., Laurier, C., Guay, J. P., & Knight, R. A. (2024). An inclusive typology of youths convicted of sexual or non-sexual crime. Journal of Sexual Aggression, 30(2), 166–184.
