= Kazem Kazemi =

Mohammad Kazem Kazemi
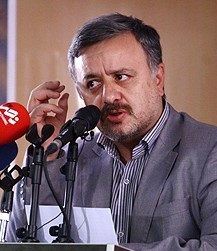
- Born: January 10, 1968 (age 58); Herat, Islamic Republic of Afghanistan
- Occupations: Poet, Author, Literary Critic, Editor

Mohammad Kazem Kazemi (Persian: محمد کاظم کاظمی; born January 10, 1968) is a notable contemporary Afghan poet, author, literary critic and a book editor by profession. Among others, he is currently a member of the editorial board of Dorre Dari (Pearl of Dari) (Persian: در دری) and Khatt-e-Sevom (Third Script) (Persian: خط سوم) Journals. Kazemi has authored many books on Persian literature and Afghan poetry. He has also written the book “Rozaneh” (Window) (Persian: روزنه) which has been published for the fourth time in Iran and is considered to be the most famous poetry textbook. He is currently living in Mashhad in the Islamic Republic of Iran.

== Personal life ==
Kazemi was born into a religious family in Herat province of Islamic Republic of Afghanistan. His father, Haj Mohammad Ali Kazemi, was a socially and politically active person, and his grandfather, Haj Mohammad Kazem, was a poet himself. Kazemi went to high school in Herat and has lived there until 1975, when he left Herat for Kabul. In 1984, he left Afghanistan and immigrated to Iran in order to escape the War in Afghanistan and to pursue his studies. He studied Civil Engineering at Ferdawsi University of Mashhad. He started writing poetry at the age of fourteen. In Iran, Kazemi was introduced to the works of poets like Abdul-Qādir Bēdil, Mohammad Ali Moalem Dameghani, and Khalilullah Khalili. Kazemi's poetry is influenced by those of Moalem and Bedil. It was the poem “Bazgasht” (Return) (Persian: باز گشت), written in 1991, that brought him national and international fame. Return, which is widely considered as an iconic poem in contemporary Persian poetry, narrates the story of an Afghan refugee in Iran who has decided to return to Afghanistan. Kazemi used very strong and in some way very ironical metaphors in this poem to emphasize on Afghan's suffering in Iran but he also highlighted the common culture and religious beliefs between the two nations. Today, almost every Afghan and Iranian can recite one or two lines from this poem. Since then, Return has inspired a host of responses both in and outside of Iran.

== Poetry ==
Though lots of Kezemi's poetry has a religious theme, he has also written a lot about the socio-political situation in Afghanistan and in Iran. In his style of poetry, Kazemi is influenced by Abdul-Qādir Bēdil and Moalem. In an interview with the Iranian website Soreh, Kazemi has told that he has memorized 3,000 verses of Bedil's poetry.

== Critics ==
Many Afghan and Iranian writers and critics have praised Kazemi for his work and his efforts to introduce Afghan literature beyond Afghanistan’s borders and for his abilities as a poet and as a writer. However, the responses to Kazemi's work have not always been sympathetic.

== Bibliography ==
- Poetry of Resistance in Afghanistan (Persian: شعر مقاومت در افغانستان), 1991
- Persian Poetry (Persian: شعر فارسی), 1st Edition, 2000
- One Tongue, No Tongue (Persian: همزبانی و بی‌زبانی), 1st Edition, 2003
- The Key of an Open Door (Persian: کلید در باز), 1st Edition, 2008
- Profanity (Persian: کفران), 2nd Edition, 2009
- Selected Bidel’s Ghazals (Persian: گزیدهء غزل‌های بیدل), 2nd Edition, 2009
- On Foot I came (Persian: پیاده آمده بودم), 3rd Edition, 2009
- The Sweet Persian Tongue – Dari-Persian in contemporary Afghanistan (Persian: قند پارسی), 2010
- Observation of Morning (Persian: رصد صبح), 2nd Edition, 2011
- The Story of Stones and Bricks (Persian: قصه سنگ و خشت), 6th Edition, 2011
- Window (Persian: روزنه), 4th Edition, 2012
