= Mary Norbert Körte =

American poet (1933/1934–2022)

Mary Norbert Korte
- Born: 1933 or 1934; Oakland, California, U.S.
- Died: November 14, 2022 (aged 88); Willits, California, U.S.
- Education: Dominican University of California
- Occupations: Poet, teacher, activist

Mary Norbert Körte (or Korte or Koerte) (1933/1934 – November 14, 2022) was an American poet associated with the Beat movement. A former Catholic Religious Sister from the San Francisco Bay area, in the 1960s she became a poet, teacher and social activist. Her published work includes several volumes of poetry. She died on November 14, 2022, aged 88.

== Life ==
=== Early life ===
Körte grew up in the hills near Oakland and Berkeley, east of San Francisco Bay. Born into a conservative and deeply religious family, she was enrolled for her high school studies in the prestigious St. Rose Academy in San Francisco, run by the Dominican Sisters of San Rafael. At the age of 17, she felt that the way of life the Sisters followed would provide her an escape from the privileged life of her family, and entered that religious congregation in 1951. When she professed her first religious vows the following year, she was given the religious name of Sister Mary Norbert, which she kept the rest of her life.

Körte then prepared for a life of teaching within the institutions of her congregation. She attended Dominican College run by them (now the Dominican University of California) where she earned a bachelor's degree in Latin, which was followed by studies at the Catholic University of America in Washington, D.C., for her master's degree in that same field. During that period she was occupied with translating Vergil’s Georgics into iambic pentameter and studying classical texts and formal poetry. At the same time, however, she took notice of the antiwar protests taking place throughout the country which she supported.

In 1965, Körte was allowed to attend the influential Berkeley Poetry Conference where she was minor sensation due to her wearing of her Dominican religious habit to the event. As result of her experience at the conference, which was a gathering which would become known as a watershed moment in the history of American poetry, she came to know and became greatly influenced by readings by Allen Ginsberg, Jack Spicer, Lew Welch and other poets of that era. She began to write poetry about a range of topics reflecting the social upheaval of the times. In this she formed a friendship with Brother Antoninus, a Dominican lay brother also in the Bay area, who was also a poet struggling with the place of poetry in their society. She began to identify with the Beat community of the city and to assist poor poets living in Haight-Ashbury, bringing them food from the convent. The Beat poet David Meltzer helped get her first book of poetry, Hymn to the Gentle Sun, published in 1967. As her secular and religious interests diverged, she left the convent in 1968. "I kept going to peace rallies, and they kept telling me not to, and I kept going to peace rallies..." she told a student in the early 1980s.

=== Poet and activist ===
On leaving the convent, Körte moved to Berkeley to take a job as a secretary in the psychology department at the University of California, Berkeley. There she became friends with the poet Denise Levertov. Nominated by Levertov, Körte was awarded a National Endowment for the Arts grant in 1969. In 1972, she moved again, becoming caretaker of woodland property near Mendocino in northern California. She eventually bought the property, supporting herself by teaching at a nearby reservation school. She continued to write poetry, and she became active in the environmental movement, including Save the Redwoods. In the early 1980s, she worked with students around Mendocino County as part of the California Poets In The Schools program (CPITS). She oversaw the publication of anthologies of student writers, including group poetry; and was delighted when one young writer's piece was included in a statewide anthology produced by CPITS. She was a favorite with many of the students, who were impressed by her lack of condescension and her enthusiastic approach to poetry. She saw potential in everyone and awakened a number of young people to poetry and the power of words, as well their own talents with words.

=== Legacy ===
River Campus Libraries at the University of Rochester in New York holds a collection of 10 boxes of Körte's personal papers. They include correspondence, manuscripts, works by other authors, biographical documents, and other material.

== Bibliography ==
- Hymn to the Gentle Sun (1967)
- The Beginning Is the Life, Is the Word (1967)
- Beginning of Lines: Response to "Albion Moonlight" (1968)
- The Generation of Love, (1969)
- My Day Was Beautiful, How Was Yours? and The Going (1969)
- A Breviary in Time of War (1970)
- The Midnight Bridge (1970)
- Mammals of Delight: Poems, 1972–1977 (1978)
