= M. F. Korn =

American author

Michael Frederick Korn
- Occupation: Novelist
- Writing career
- Genre: Science fiction
- Website: www.mfkorn.com

Michael F. Korn is an American author who writes horror and science fiction. He has written eleven novels and his stories have appeared in over 220 magazines worldwide. He lives in Louisiana.

== Bibliography ==
- The White Trash Witches' Coven / Pavane For a Scream Queen (2004)
- All the Mutant Trash in All the Galaxies (2003)
- Confessions of a Ghoul and Other Stories (2001)
- Aliens, Minibikes and Other Staples of Suburbia (2001)
- Skimming the Gumbo Nuclear (2001)
- Rachmaninoff's Ghost (1985)
