= History of Malawi =

The history of Malawi covers the area of present-day Malawi. The region was once part of the Maravi Empire (Maravi was a kingdom which straddled the current borders of Malawi, Mozambique, and Zambia, in the 16th century). In colonial times, the territory was ruled by the British, under whose control it was known first as British Central Africa and later Nyasaland. It became part of the Federation of Rhodesia and Nyasaland. The country achieved full independence, as Malawi, in 1964. After independence, Malawi was ruled as a one-party state under Hastings Banda until 1994.

== Prehistory ==
In 1991, a hominid jawbone was discovered near Uraha village that was between 2.3 and 2.5 million years old. Early humans inhabited the vicinity of Lake Malawi 50,000 to 60,000 years ago. Human remains at a site dated about 8000 BCE showed physical characteristics similar to peoples living today in the Horn of Africa. At another site, dated 1500 BCE, the remains possess features resembling San people. They might be responsible for the rock paintings found south of Lilongwe in Chencherere and Mphunzi. According to Chewa myth, the first people in the area were a race of dwarf archers which they called Akafula or Akaombwe. Bantu-speaking people entered the region during the first four centuries of the "Common Era", bringing with them the use of iron and slash-and-burn agriculture. Later waves of Bantu settlement, between the 13th and 15th centuries, displaced or assimilated the earlier Bantu and pre-Bantu populations.

== Maravi Empire ==
Map of the Maravi Kingdom at its height, c. 1650

The name Malawi is thought to derive from the word Maravi. The people of the Maravi Empire were iron workers. Maravi is thought to mean "Flames" and may have come from the sight of many kilns lighting up the night sky. A dynasty known as the Maravi Empire was founded by the Amaravi people in the late 15th century. The Amaravi, who eventually became known as the Chewa (a word possibly derived from a term meaning "foreigner"), migrated to Malawi from the region of the modern-day Republic of Congo to escape unrest and disease. The Chewa attacked the Akafula, whom no longer exist.

Eventually encompassing most of modern Malawi, as well as parts of modern-day Mozambique and Zambia, the Maravi Empire began on the southwestern shores of Lake Malawi. The head of the empire during its expansion was the Kalonga (also spelt Karonga). The Kalonga ruled from his headquarters in Mankhamba. Under the leadership of the Kalonga, sub-chiefs were appointed to occupy and subdue new areas. The empire began to decline during the early 18th century when fighting among the sub-chiefs and the burgeoning slave trade weakened the authority of the Maravi Empire.

== Trade and invasions ==
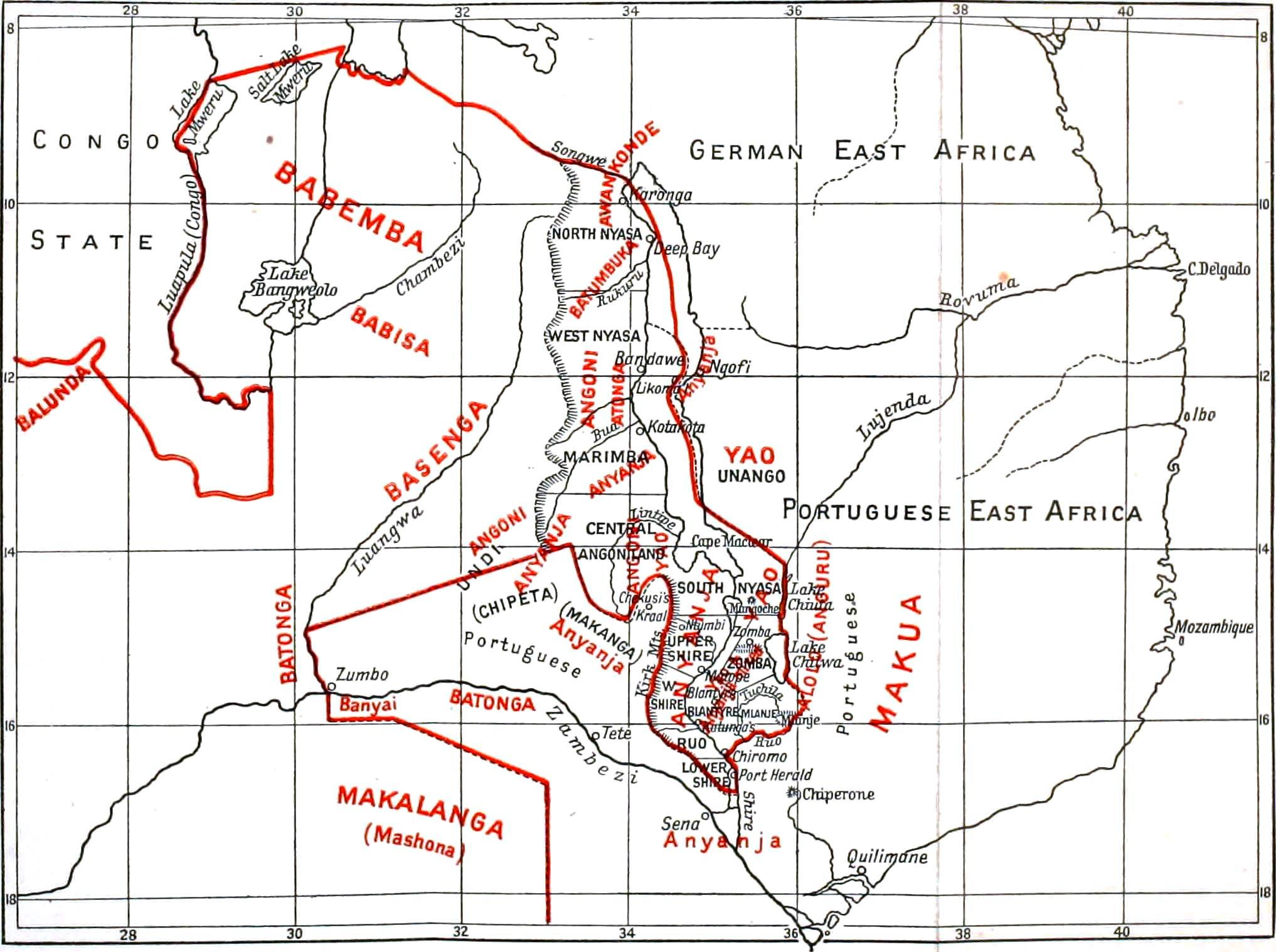
Malawian ethnic groups at the end of the 19th century

=== Portuguese influence ===
Initially, the Maravi Empire's economy was largely dependent on agriculture, especially the production of millet and sorghum. It was during the Maravi Empire, sometime during the 16th century, that Europeans first came into contact with the people of Malawi. Under the Maravi Empire, the Chewa had access to the coast of modern-day Mozambique. Through this coastal area, the Chewa traded ivory, iron, and slaves with the Portuguese and Arabs. Trade was enhanced by the common language of Chewa (Nyanja) which was spoken throughout the Maravi Empire.

In 1616, the Portuguese trader Gaspar Bocarro journeyed through what is now Malawi, producing the first European account of the country and its people. The Portuguese were also responsible for the introduction of maize to the region. Maize would eventually replace sorghum as the staple of the Malawian diet. Malawian tribes traded slaves with the Portuguese. These slaves were sent mainly to work on Portuguese plantations in Mozambique or to Brazil.

=== Ngoni ===
The decline of the Maravi Empire was due to the entry of two powerful groups into the Malawi region. In the 19th century, the Angoni or Ngoni people and their chief Zwangendaba arrived from the Natal region of modern-day South Africa. The Angoni were part of a great migration, known as the mfecane, of people fleeing from the head of the Zulu Empire, Shaka Zulu. The Ngoni people settled mostly in what is modern-day central Malawi; particularly Ntcheu and parts of Dedza district. However, some groups proceeded north; entering Tanzania and settling around Lake Victoria. But splinter groups broke off and headed back south; settling in modern-day northern Malawi, particularly Mzimba district, where they mixed with another migrant group coming from across Lake Malawi called the Bawoloka. Clearly, the mfecane had a significant impact on Southern Africa. The Angoni adopted Shaka's military tactics to subdue the lesser tribes, including the Maravi, they found along their way. Staging from rocky areas, the Ngoni impis would raid the Chewa (also called Achewa) and plunder food, oxen and women. Young men were drawn in as new fighting forces while older men were reduced to domestic slaves and/or sold off to Arab slave traders operating from the Lake Malawi region.

=== Yao ===
The second group to take power around this time was the Yao. The Yao were richer and more independent than the Makuwa. They came to Malawi from northern Mozambique either to escape from conflict with the Makuwa, who had become their enemies, or to profit from the slave and ivory trades with the Arabs from Zanzibar, the Portuguese, and the French. In any case, upon migrating to Malawi in the 1800s, they soon began buying slaves from the Chewa and Ngoni. The Yao are recorded to have also attacked them in order to capture prisoners whom they later sold as slaves.

By the time, David Livingstone encountered them on his travels, recording their practice of slavery, they traded with the Rwozi of Zimbabwe, with the Bisa on the Luangwa river in modern-day Zambia, and even the Congo and the eastern coast. Their extensive expeditions required educated merchants and tradespeople, who were naturally proficient in using the Arabic alphabet. Craftsmen built dhows for lake travel, farmers set out irrigation for the growing of rice, and prominent members of society founded madrassahs and boarding schools. The Yao were the first, and for a long while, the only group to use firearms, which they bought from Europeans and Arabs, in conflicts with other tribes, including the Makololo who had migrated from Southern Africa after being displaced by the Zulu people.

By the 1860s, the Yao had converted to Islam. The conversion is normally attributed to connections made during their trading expeditions, especially those to the Kilwa Sultanate and Zanzibar. The conversion had begun before the 1840s, as can be told from the accounts of Salim bin Abdallah, who is better known as the Jumbe of Nkhotakota. Although the Yao were not animist before Islam, they believed in a God accessible through the intercedence of ancestral spirits. As a benefit of their conversion, the Yao employed Swahili and Arab sheikhs from the coast who promoted literacy and founded mosques; Chief Mponda in Mangochi had founded almost twelve madrassas before the Christian missionaries arrived in 1875. Their writings were in Kiswahili which became a lingua franca of Malawi from 1870 to the 1960s.

=== Arabs and their Swahili allies ===
Using their strong partnership with the Yao, the Arab traders set up several trading posts along the shore of Lake Malawi. The Yao expeditions to the east attracted the attention of the Swahili-Arabs. It was from the Yao, the Swahili and Arabs knew the existence and the geography of Lake Malawi. Jumbe (Salim Abdallah) followed the Yao trade route from the eastern side of Lake Malawi up to Nkhotakota. When Jumbe arrived in Nkhotakota in 1840, he found a number of Yao and Bisa well established. Some of those Yao he found in Nkhotakota were already Islamised and he opted to employ them rather than employing non-Muslim Chewa. During the height of his power, Jumbe transported between 5,000 and 20,000 slaves through Nkhotakota annually. From Nkhotakota, the slaves were transported in caravans of no less than 500 slaves to the small island of Kilwa Kisiwani off the coast of modern-day Tanzania. The founding of these various posts effectively shifted the slave trade in Malawi from the Portuguese in Mozambique to the Arabs of Zanzibar.

Although the Yao and the Angoni continually clashed with each other, neither was able to win a decisive victory. However, the Ngoni of Dedza opted to work the Yao of Mpondas. The remaining members of the Maravi Empire, however, were nearly wiped out in attacks from both sides. Some Achewa chiefs saved themselves by creating alliances with the Swahili people who were allied with the Arab slave traders.

=== Lomwe of Malawi ===
The Lomwe of Malawi are a recent introduction having arrived as late as the 1890s. The Lomwe came from a hill in Mozambique called uLomwe, north of the Zambezi River and south east of Lake Chilwa in Malawi. Theirs was also a story of hunger largely instigated by the Portuguese settlers moving into the neighbourhoods of uLomwe. To escape from ill-treatment, the Lomwe headed north and entered Nyasaland by way of the southern tip of lake Chilwa, settling in the Phalombe and Mulanje areas.

In Mulanje they found the Yao and Mang'anja already settled. The Yao chiefs such as Chikumbu, Mtilamanja, Matipwili, Juma, Chiuta welcomed the Lomwe as their cousins from Mozambique. A large number of Lomwe were given land by the Yao and Mang'anja. Later on the Lomwe got employment on tea estates that various British companies were establishing on the foothills of Mount Mulanje. They gradually spread into Thyolo and Chiradzulu. The Lomwe readily mixed with the local Mang'anja tribes, and there are no reported cases of tribal conflict.

=== Early European contact ===
The Portuguese were reportedly the first Europeans to enter Malawi; in 1859, acting off a tip received from a Portuguese source, David Livingstone discovered Lake Malawi. The Yao allegedly told him that the mass of water he saw was called Nyasa. Livingstone, who did not know Chiyao, possibly thought that Nyasa was the proper name of the lake. However, the term Nyasa in Chiyao meant the lake in English. His next journey, with Bishop Charles Mackenzie from the UMCA in 1861, saw hostility erupt between the Muslim Yao and the non-Muslim Mang'anja, whom the bishop preferred to preach to; those of the Yao who practised Islam and slavery were naturally hostile to the Christian missionaries. The skirmishes eventually subsided after Mackenzie's death from malaria.

More group of missionaries arrived in 1875-6 from the Free Church of Scotland, and established a base at Cape Maclear at the southern end of Lake Malawi. This time, attempts were also made to convert those of the Yao who were Muslims. Although some of the Amangochi Yao were prepared to convert, slow progress was made. After some initial debate, Bishop Robert Laws was selected as leader. Laws, who quickly gained fame for his medical expertise, decided to establish missions further north, at Bandawe among the Tonga and at Kaningina among the Ngoni people. There, the missionaries found fertile ground in a turbulent political climate: the missions became buffer zones for the Tonga, who were near-constantly under attack by Ngoni raiders. Some of the teachers of the Tonga were the Nyanja who had embraced Christianity at Cape Maclear in Mangochi. In 1878, a number of traders, mostly from Glasgow, formed the African Lakes Company to supply goods and services to the missionaries. Others soon followed: traders, hunters, planters came, and even missionaries from different denominations; from 1889, the Catholic White Fathers attempted to convert the Yao.

In 1894, the mission extended to the Tumbuka, who were also being attacked by the powerful Ngoni; Laws opened a mission station near Rumphi that year. The Tumbuka, like the Tonga sought refuge among the missionaries and embraced Christianity. By contrast, the Yao were still completely distanced from Christianity, and were still writing and reading in Arabic, which would soon not be recognized in Malawi; this would prove to disadvantage the Yao. The failure to convert the Yao Muslims to Christianity contributed to the negative appearance of the Yao people in traditional Euro-centric history. The Yao socio-economic contribution to Malawi was not recognised, rather history judged them as great slave traders. Under H. H. Johnson, the British fought Yao chiefs such as Makanjila and Mponda Jalasi for five years before they were subdued. Today, fewer Yao are found in jobs requiring literacy, which has forced a large number of them to migrate to South Africa as a source of labour. The Yao believe that they have been deliberately marginalized by the authorities because of their faith; in Malawi, they are predominantly farmers, tailors, guards, fishermen or working in other unskilled manual jobs. At one time, a number of Yao concealed their names in order to progress in education: Mariam was known as Mary; Yusufu was called Joseph; Che Sigele became Jeanet.

== British rule ==
Flag of Nyasaland

In 1883, a consul of the British government was accredited to the "Kings and Chiefs of Central Africa" and in 1891, the British established the British Central Africa Protectorate.

In 1907, the name was changed to Nyasaland or the Nyasaland Protectorate (Nyasa is the Chiyao word for "lake"). In the 1950s, Nyasaland was joined with Northern and Southern Rhodesia in 1953 to form the Federation of Rhodesia and Nyasaland. The Federation was dissolved on 31 December 1963.

In January 1915, John Chilembwe, a Baptist pastor in south-eastern Nyasaland, led an unsuccessful revolt against British colonial rule known as the Chilembwe uprising. Chilembwe opposed both the recruitment of Nyasas as porters in the East African campaign of World War I, as well as the system of colonial rule. Chilembwe's followers attacked local plantations, but a rapid counteroffensive by government forces defeated the rebels. Chilembwe was killed, and many of his followers were executed.

In 1944, the Nyasaland African Congress (NAC), inspired by the African National Congress' Peace Charter of 1914, emerged. NAC soon spread across Southern African with powerful branches emerging among migrant Malawian workers in Salisbury (now Harare) in Southern Rhodesia and Lusaka, in Northern Rhodesia.

Thousands of Nyasalanders fought in the Second World War.

In July 1958, Dr Hastings Kamuzu Banda returned to the country after a long absence in the United States, the United Kingdom and Ghana. He assumed leadership of the NAC, which later became the Malawi Congress Party (MCP). In 1959, Banda was sent to Gwelo Prison for his political activities but was released in 1960 to participate in a constitutional conference in London.

In August 1961, the MCP won an overwhelming victory in an election for a new Legislative Council. It also gained an important role in the new Executive Council and ruled Nyasaland in all but name a year later. In a second constitutional conference in London in November 1962, the British Government agreed to give Nyasaland self-governing status the following year.

Hastings Banda became Prime Minister on 1 February 1963, although the British still controlled the country's financial, security, and judicial systems. A new constitution took effect in May 1963, providing for virtually complete internal self-government.

== Independence ==
Malawi Independence Act 1964 (Note: Section 8.)
- Act of Parliament
- Parliament of the United Kingdom
- Long title: An Act to make provision for and in connection with the attainment by Nyasaland of fully responsible status within the Commonwealth.
- Citation: 1964 c. 46
- Territorial extent: United Kingdom

Dates
- Royal assent: 10 June 1964
- Commencement: 6 July 1964 (Note: Section 1(1).)

Other legislation
- Amended by: Emergency Laws (Re-enactments and Repeals) Act 1964; Finance Act 1969; Statute Law (Repeals) Act 1969; Statute Law (Repeals) Act 1977; Interpretation Act 1978; International Organisations Act 1981; British Nationality Act 1981; Family Law Act 1986; Copyright, Designs and Patents Act 1988; Merchant Shipping Act 1995; Commonwealth Act 2002; Armed Forces Act 2006

Status: Amended

Text of statute as originally enacted

Revised text of statute as amended

Text of the Malawi Independence Act 1964 as in force today (including any amendments) within the United Kingdom, from legislation.gov.uk.

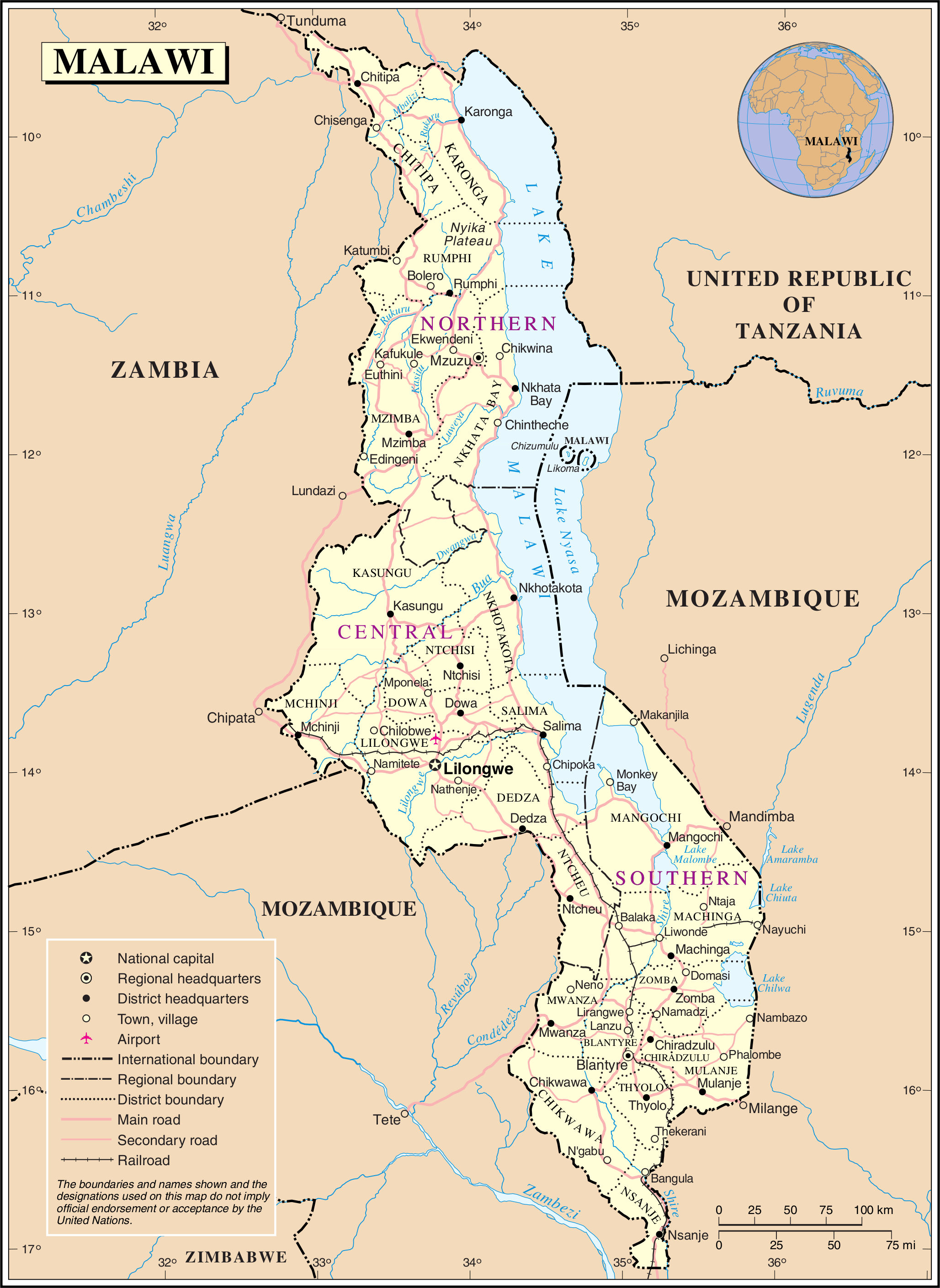
Map of Malawi

Malawi became a fully independent member of the Commonwealth (formerly the British Commonwealth) on 6 July 1964.

Shortly after, in August and September 1964, Banda faced dissent from most of his cabinet ministers in the Cabinet Crisis of 1964. The Cabinet Crisis began with a confrontation between Banda, the prime minister, and all the cabinet ministers present on 26 August 1964. Their grievances were not dealt with, but three cabinet ministers were dismissed on 7 September. These dismissals were followed, on the same day and on 9 September, by the resignations of three more cabinet ministers in sympathy with those dismissed, although one of those who had resigned rescinded his resignation within a few hours. The reasons that the ex-ministers put forward for the confrontation and their subsequent resignations were the autocratic attitude of Banda, who failed to consult other ministers and kept power in his own hands, his insistence on maintaining diplomatic relations with South Africa and Portugal and a number of domestic austerity measures. After continuing unrest and some clashes between their supporters and those of Banda, most of the ex-ministers left Malawi in October. One ex-minister, Henry Chipembere led a small, unsuccessful armed uprising in February 1965. After its failure, he arranged for his transfer to the USA. Another ex-minister, Yatuta Chisiza, organised an even smaller incursion from Mozambique in 1967, in which he was killed. Several of the former ministers died in exile or, in the case of Orton Chirwa in a Malawian jail, but some survived to return to Malawi after Banda was deposed in 1993, and resumed public life.

In 1966, two years after the independence, Malawi adopted a republican constitution and became a one-party state with Hastings Banda as its first president.

== One-party rule ==
In 1970, Hastings Banda was declared President for life of the MCP, and in 1971 Banda consolidated his power and was named president for life of Malawi itself. The paramilitary wing of the Malawi Congress Party, the Young Pioneers, helped keep Malawi under totalitarian control until the 1990s.

Banda, who was always referred to as "His Excellency the Life President Ngwazi Dr. H. Kamuzu Banda", was a dictator. Allegiance to him was enforced at every level. Every business building was required to have an official picture of Banda hanging on the wall. No other poster, clock, or picture could be placed higher on the wall than the president's picture. The national anthem was played before most events – including movies, plays, and school assemblies. At the cinemas, a video of His Excellency waving to his subjects was shown while the anthem played. When Banda visited a city, a contingent of women was expected to greet him at the airport and dance for him. A special cloth, bearing the President's picture, was the required attire for these performances. The one radio station in the country aired the President's speeches and government propaganda. People were ordered from their homes by police, and told to lock all windows and doors, at least an hour prior to President Banda passing by. Everyone was expected to wave.

Among the laws enforced by Banda, it was illegal for women to wear see-through clothes, pants of any kind or skirts which showed any part of the knee. There were two exceptions to this: if they were at a Country Club (a place where various sports were played) and if they were at a holiday resort/hotel, which meant that with the exception of the resort/hotel staff they were not seen by the general populace. Men were not allowed to have hair below the collar; when men whose hair was too long arrived in the country from overseas, they were given a haircut before they could leave the airport. Churches had to be government sanctioned. Members of certain religious groups, such as Jehovah's Witnesses, were persecuted and forced to leave the country at one time. All Malawian citizens of Indian heritage were forced to leave their homes and businesses and move into designated Indian areas in the larger cities. At one time, they were all told to leave the country, then hand-picked ones were allowed to return. It was illegal to transfer or take privately earned funds out of the country unless approved through proper channels; proof had to be supplied to show that one had already brought in the equivalent or more in foreign currency in the past. When some left, they gave up goods and earnings.

All movies shown in theatres were first viewed by the Malawi Censorship Board. Content considered unsuitable – particularly nudity or political content – was edited. Mail was also monitored by the Censorship Board. Some overseas mail was opened, read, and sometimes edited. Videotapes had to be sent to the Censorship Board to be viewed by censors. Once edited, the movie was given a sticker stating that it was now suitable for viewing, and sent back to the owner. Telephone calls were monitored and disconnected if the conversation was politically critical. Items to be sold in bookstores were also edited. Pages, or parts of pages, were cut out or blacked out of magazines such as Newsweek and Time.

Dr Banda was a wealthy man, like most if not all world leaders. He owned houses (and lived in a palace), businesses, private helicopters, cars and other such luxuries. Speaking out against the President was strictly prohibited. Those who did so were often deported or imprisoned. Banda and his government were criticised for human rights violations by Human Rights Watch and Amnesty International. After he was deposed, Banda was put on trial for murder and attempts to destroy evidence.

During his rule, Banda was one of the very few post-colonial African leaders to maintain diplomatic relations with Apartheid-era South Africa.

== Multi-party democracy ==
Increasing domestic unrest and pressure from Malawian churches and from the international community led to a referendum in which the Malawian people were asked to vote for either a multi-party democracy or the continuation of a one-party state. On 14 June 1993, the people of Malawi voted overwhelmingly in favour of multi-party democracy. Free and fair national elections were held on 17 May 1994 under a provisional constitution, which took full effect the following year.

Bakili Muluzi, leader of the United Democratic Front (UDF), was elected president in those elections. The UDF won 82 of the 177 seats in the National Assembly and formed a coalition government with the Alliance for Democracy (AFORD). That coalition disbanded in June 1996, but some of its members remained in the government. The President was referred to as Dr Muluzi, having received an honorary degree at Lincoln University in Missouri in 1995. Malawi's newly written constitution (1995) eliminated special powers previously reserved for the Malawi Congress Party. Accelerated economic liberalisation and structural reform accompanied the political transition.

On 15 June 1999, Malawi held its second democratic elections. Bakili Muluzi was re-elected to serve a second five-year term as president, despite an MCP-AFORD Alliance that ran a joint slate against the UDF.

The aftermath of elections brought the country to the brink of civil strife. Disgruntled Tumbuka, Ngoni and Nkhonde Christian tribes dominant in the north were irritated by the election of Bakili Muluzi, a Muslim from the south. Conflict arose between Christians and Muslims of the Yao tribe (Muluzi's tribe). Property valued at over millions of dollars was either vandalised or stolen and 200 mosques were torched down.

== Malawi in the 21st century ==
In 2001, the UDF held 96 seats in the National Assembly, while the AFORD held 30, and the MCP 61. Six seats were held by independents who represent the National Democratic Alliance (NDA) opposition group. The NDA was not recognised as an official political party at that time. The National Assembly had 193 members, of whom 17 were women, including one of the Deputy Speakers.

Malawi saw its very first transition between democratically elected presidents in May 2004, when the UDF's presidential candidate Bingu wa Mutharika defeated MCP candidate John Tembo and Gwanda Chakuamba, who was backed by a grouping of opposition parties. The UDF, however, did not win a majority of seats in Parliament, as it had done in 1994 and 1999 elections. It successfully secured a majority by forming a "government of national unity" with several opposition parties. Bingu wa Mutharika left the UDF party on 5 February 2005 citing differences with the UDF, particularly over his anti-corruption campaign. He won a second term outright in the 2009 election as the head of a newly founded party, the Democratic Progressive Party. In April 2012, Mutharika died of a heart attack; the presidential title was taken over by Vice-President Joyce Banda (not related to the former president Banda). In 2014 Malawian general election Joyce Banda lost (coming third) and was replaced by Peter Mutharika, the brother of ex-President Mutharika. In 2019 Malawian general election president Peter Mutharika got narrow election victory and he was re-elected. In February 2020 Malawi Constitutional Court overturned the result because of irregularities and widespread fraud. In May 2020 Malawi Supreme Court upheld the decision and announced a new election will be held on 2 July. This was the first time election was legally challenged. Opposition leader Lazarus Chakwera won 2020 Malawian presidential election and he was sworn in as the new president of Malawi.

In August 2021, the Constitutional Court examined an appeal lodged by the Democratic Progress Party of Peter Mutharika which called for the cancellation of the 2020 presidential election because four of its representatives had been banned from sitting on the Electoral Commission. The challenge to Malawi's 2020 presidential elections was dismissed by the country's constitutional court in November 2021. Peter Mutharika returned as the president of Malawi by winning the 2025 Malawian general election.

== See also ==
- Heads of Government of Malawi
- History of Africa
- History of Southern Africa
- List of heads of state of Malawi
- Politics of Malawi
- Lilongwe history and timeline

== Bibliography ==
- S.S. Murray, A Handbook of Nyasaland
- Valiant Mussa, History of Islam in Malawi before and after Christianity
- Leroy Vail and Landeg White (eds). Tribalism in the Political History of Malawi
