= Malawian Defence Force =

Military force of Malawi

- Coat of arms of Malawi
- Service branches: Malawi Army; Malawi Maritime Force; Malawi Air Force; Malawi National Service
- Headquarters: Kamuzu Barracks, Lilongwe
- Website: Official website

Leadership
- Commander-in-Chief and Minister of Defence: Peter Mutharika
- Commander of the Defence Force: Lieutenant General George Jafu

Personnel
- Military age: 18
- Active personnel: 25,500

Expenditure
- Budget: $70 million (FY00/01)
- Percent of GDP: 0.76% (FY00/01)

Industry
- Foreign suppliers: France; Portugal; Russia; South Africa; United Kingdom; United States

Related articles
- History: Mozambican Civil War; Operation Bwezani; M23 Rebellion; ADF Insurgency
- Ranks: Military ranks of Malawi

The Malawi Defence Force is the state military organisation responsible for defending Malawi. It originated from elements of the British King's African Rifles, colonial units formed before independence in 1964.

The military is organized under the purview of the Ministry of Defence.

== Malawi Army ==
Before independence, Malawi depended for its military supplies on the barracks in Rhodesia, as British colonial military logistics was usually organized on a continental basis, rather than at the level of individual colonies. The Malawi Rifles were formed when the country gained its independence from the United Kingdom in 1964. Its first battalion was formed from the 1st Battalion, King's African Rifles. Upon independence the battalion became the 1st Battalion of the Malawi Rifles (Malawi Army). They were based at what became the headquarters of the Malawi Army at Cobbe Barracks, Zomba. Cobbe Barracks had been named in May 1958 in honor of the British General Alexander Cobbe VC, who had served with the King's African Rifles. The Rifles were reportedly at a strength of 2,000 men at independence. On 6 July 1966 Malawi became a Republic and His Excellency Dr Hastings Kamuzu Banda became the first president. After the swearing in ceremony his first duty was to present the battalion with his own presidential colour and the new regimental colour. It was under the leadership of Brigadier Paul Lewis, a British expatriate, and Welsh Colonel Dudley Thornton commanded from 1965–67. In 1966, about 60% of the officers in the battalion were former non-commissioned officers.

After the Cabinet Crisis of 1964, the Malawi Army destroyed Henry Chipembere's insurrection in Mangochi District and Machinga District in 1965. Another of the ministers ousted during the Cabinet Crisis was Yatuta Chisiza. Chisiza fled to Tanzania, and founded the Socialist League of Malawi, the most radical Malawian opposition party. He also began to conduct guerilla operations against Banda's government. In 1967 Chisiza and nine others entered Mwanza District from Tanzania. In the following clash with the Army and Young Pioneers on 9 October 1967, he and two other members of the insurgent forces were killed, five were captured, and the others fled.

In 1970, the International Institute for Strategic Studies listed the Army as comprising one infantry battalion [1 MR at Zomba] and supporting services, having a strength of 1,150.

Malawi was allied with Portugal during the Mozambican War of Independence (1964–1974), and the Malawi Army consequently cooperated with the Portuguese Army to secure the Mozambican-Malawian border and arrest FRELIMO rebels. Following FRELIMO's victory and the independence of Mozambique, several Portuguese colonial secret police agents as well as FRELIMO deserters joined the Malawi Army.

Gurkha officer John "Johnny" Clements was advanced to Acting Brigadier in May 1971, and commanded the Malawi Army until September 1972. The Army's first black commander, Brigadier Graciano Matewere was appointed during this time. Banda promoted Matewere instantly to Major General after the resolution of the South African Airways hijacking in Blantyre in 1972. Matewere was retired by Banda in 1980 and died in 2001.

Declassified Defense Intelligence Agency reporting from 1985 states that "there is also a military college [likely the Kamuzu Military College, at Salima that is probably one of the finest, most efficiently organized, and operated military training schools in Sub-Saharan Africa. [It] conducts recruit training, numerous enlisted courses, officer cadet courses, [a] platoon leader course, company commanders course (sic), communications courses, NCO courses, a catering course, and will add a staff officers course in the future." The same source listed the Army Commander as General Melvin Khanga, with the deputy commander, Lieutenant General Issac Yohane, and the Director of Training Major General Wilfred Mponela.

=== Transition to democracy ===
In 1992–1993, the army played a vital role in dismantling Banda's dictatorship.

After the 8 March 1992 pastoral letter:

There were public demonstrations in support of the bishops—notably at the University in Blantyre and Zomba, where soldiers indicated their support for the students and deterred violent police action against the protesters. This was the first sign of the army's future political role. In May 1992 student protesters were joined by striking workers in Blantyre. In two days of riots dozens of protesters were killed by armed police and Young Pioneers.

In December 1992:

... the army intervened to disarm the MYP forcibly. A bar-room argument in ... Mzuzu ended with Young Pioneers shooting two soldiers dead. The middle-ranking and junior officers effectively mutinied against the army commander, General Isaac Yohane, attacking the Ministry of Youth and other MYP installations in Lilongwe, as well as looting the MCP headquarters. The army then moved into MYP bases throughout the country.

The operation was called "Bwezani" which means "taking back" or "returning". This event was vital in the history of the Malawi Army.

=== Twenty-first century ===
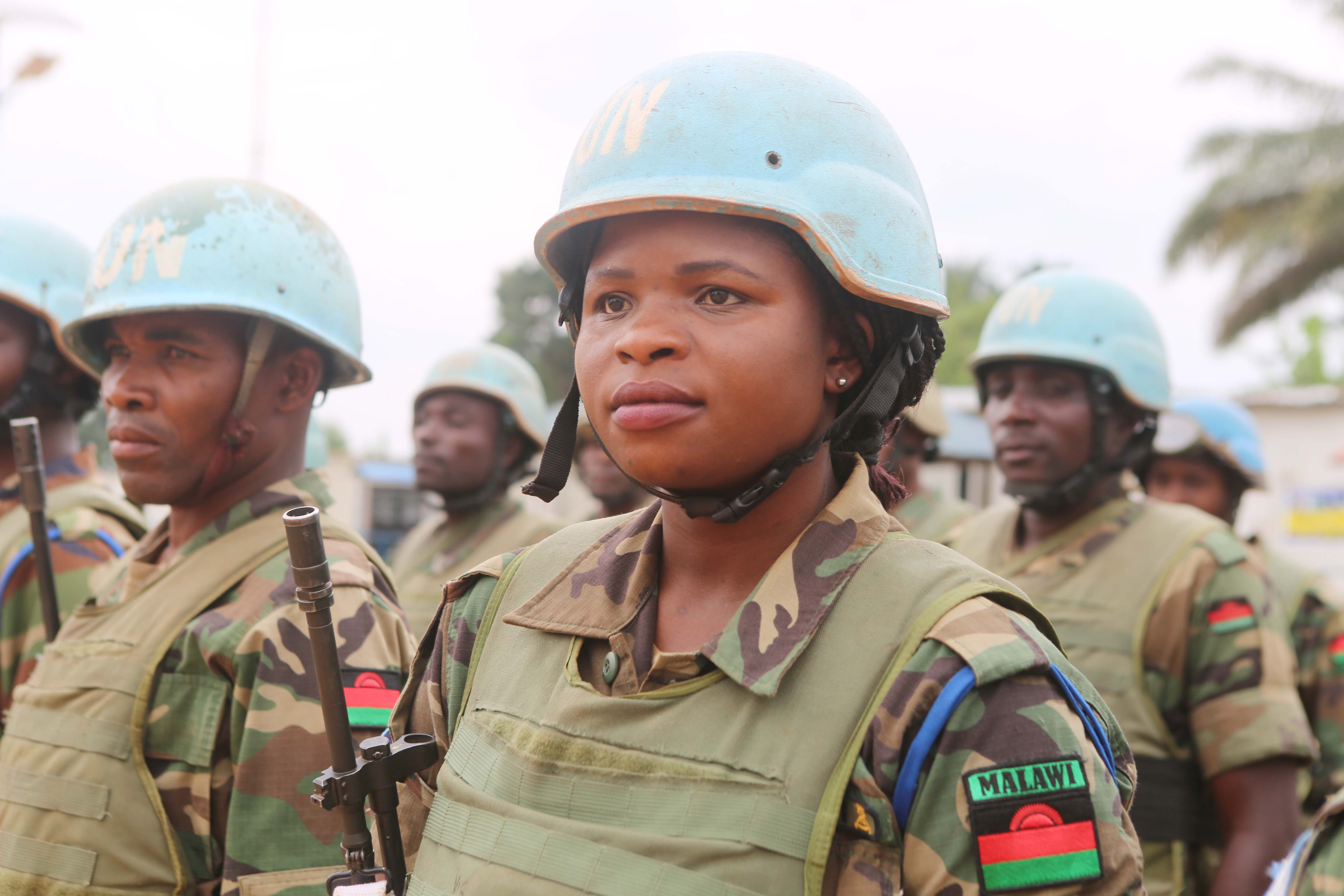
Malawian soldier as part of UN peacekeeping in Kivu, D.R. Congo

Malawi was a pioneer among African countries with regards to the integration of women into its modern armed forces. Since 1999, women have served as special forces (5% of the Force Intervention Brigade are female), paratroopers, pilots, and medical staff.

State Department International Military Education and Training documentation from Fiscal Year 2003 indicates the United States trained army personnel from the 2nd Battalion, Malawi Rifles, probably at Kamuzu Barracks, Lilongwe, 3rd Battalion, Malawi Rifles (Moyale Barracks, Mzuzu), the Parachute Battalion, and the Combat Support Battalion (Mvera).

In July 2004 General Joseph Chimbayo was succeeded by Marko Chiziko. In 2011 General Chiziko was succeeded by Henry Odillo as MDF Commander.

On 5 April 2012 when President Bingu wa Mutharika died, there were rumours of an attempted constitutional coup intended to prevent vice-president Joyce Banda from becoming president as outlined by the constitution. The military, under General Henry Odillo, stepped in and vowed to support and uphold the constitution of Malawi. They reportedly stationed security members at Banda's residence following the news of Mutharika's death. These acts had a direct impact on the transition of power.

Malawi has signed the initial agreements joining the SADC Standby Brigade, the southern African component of the African Standby Force.

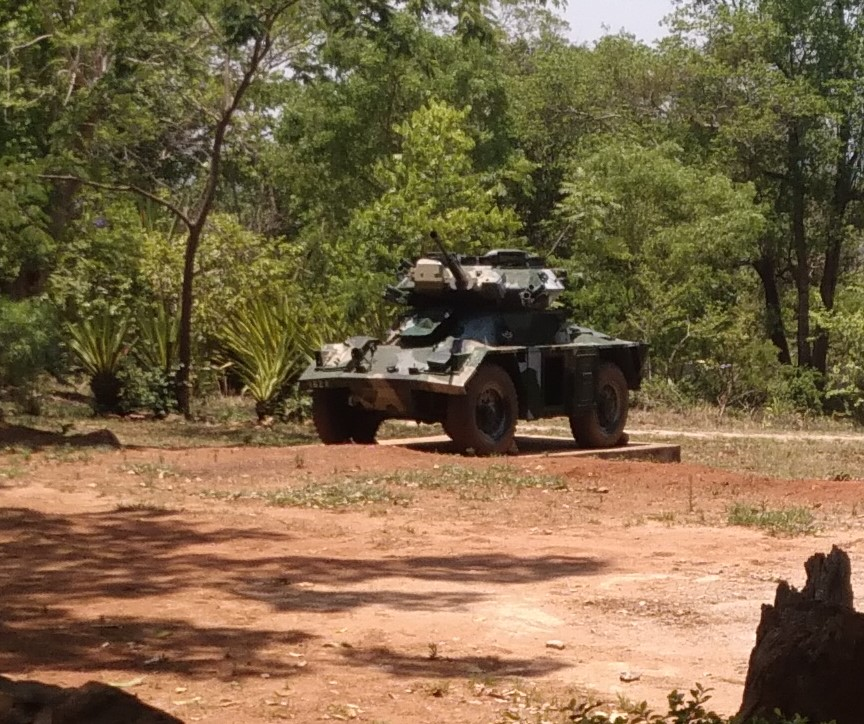
A Malawian Fox armoured car at the MDF Museum in Zomba.

The Force Intervention Brigade of the United Nations Organization Stabilization Mission in the Democratic Republic of the Congo was authorized by the United Nations Security Council on 28 March 2013 through Resolution 2098. 2,550 troops were drawn almost equally from Malawi, the Tanzania People's Defence Force, and the South African National Defence Force.

After Peter Mutharika became President in 2014, he replaced the Defence Force commander four times over the course of six years. On August 4, 2014, General Henry Odillo was succeeded by General Ignaious Maulana, the former Chief of Military Operations. In July–August 2016, General Maulana was replaced by his former deputy Griffin Supuni-Phiri. Another change occurred in 2019. In March 2020, General Vincent Nundwe, who had won praise for the army's handling of six months of protests over Mutharika's election victory in the 2019 Malawian general elections, was dismissed and replaced by Major General Andrew Lapken Namathanga, the former Air Force commander. Six months later, the new President, Lazarus Chakwera, reinstated Nundwe.

On 14 November 2018, during FIB Rotation VI, an officer, sergeant, corporal, and three soldiers of the MDF were killed in action in the Congo.

== Armoured fighting vehicles ==
| Name | Origin | Type | Variant | In service | Notes |
|---|---|---|---|---|---|
| Eland | South Africa | Armoured car | Eland-90 | 30 | |
| Ferret | United Kingdom | Armoured car | | 8 | |
| FV721 Fox | United Kingdom | Armoured car | | 20 | |
| RAM MK3 | Israel | Armoured car | | 8 | |
| PUMA M26-15 | South Africa | MRAP | | 8 | |
| Marauder | South Africa | MRAP | | 9 | |
| Casspir | South Africa | MRAP | | 14 | |

== Artillery ==
| Name | Origin | Type | Variant | In service | Notes |
|---|---|---|---|---|---|
| L118 light gun | United Kingdom | Towed howitzer | | 9 | |
| L16 81mm mortar | United Kingdom | Mortar | L16A1 | 82 | |
| ZPU | Soviet Union | Towed anti-aircraft gun | ZPU-4 | 40 | |

== Air Force ==
The Malawi Air Force was established with German help in 1976 with the delivery of six single-engined Dornier Do 27s and eight Do 28 light twins in 1976-1980. Also in the same era the air force received an Alouette III, an AS 350 and an AS 355 Ecureuil, as well as three SA 330 H/L Puma Helicopters from France. A single BAe 125-800 was delivered in 1986. Four Dornier 228 light twin turbo props were acquired between 1986 and 1989 in part to allow disposal of the older Dornier products. In 1990 two Douglas C-47 with PT6A turboprops were delivered from the US.

=== Current aircraft ===
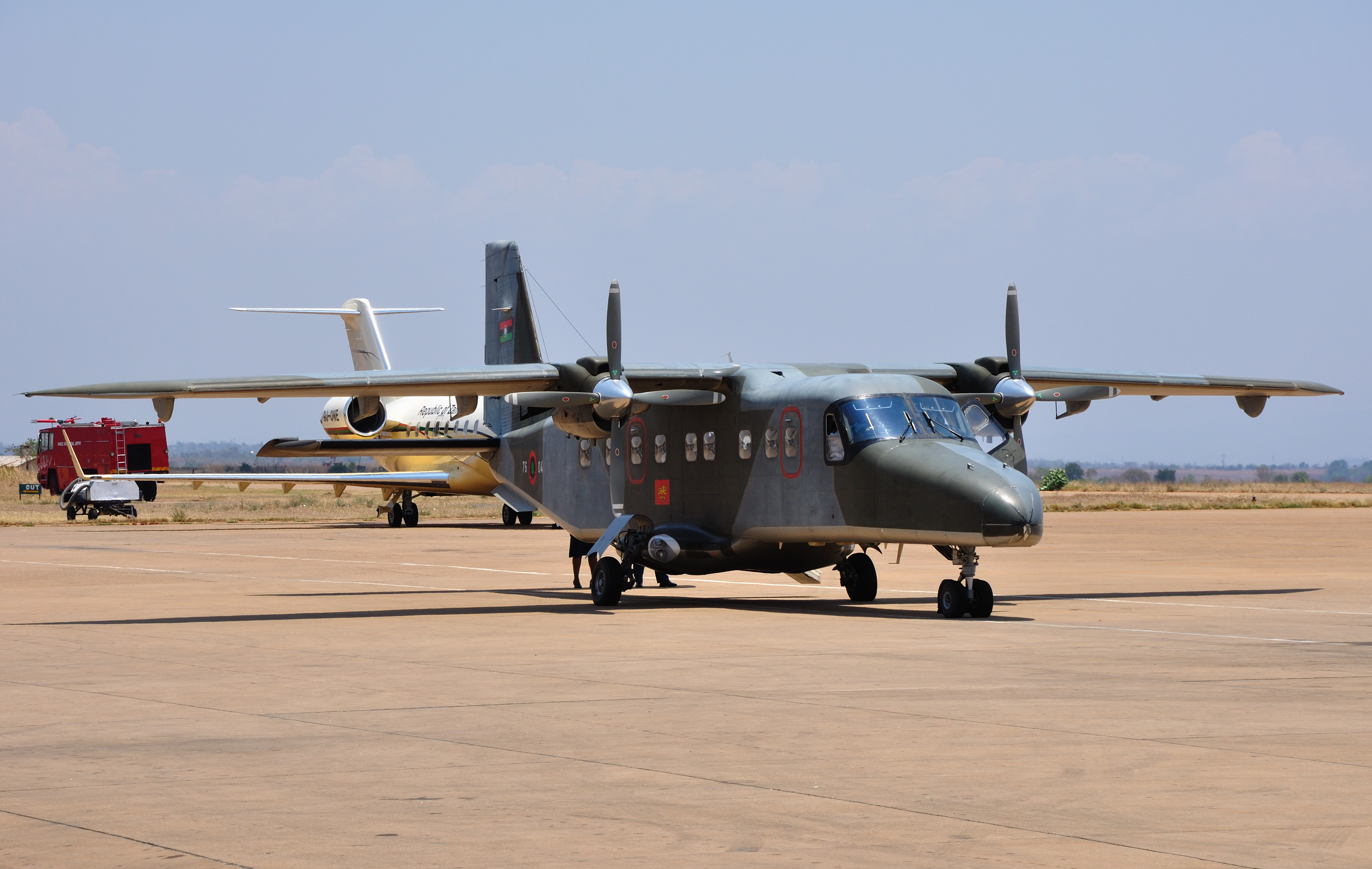
A Malawian Dornier 228

| Aircraft | Origin | Type | Variant | In service | Notes |
Transport
| Xian MA600 | China | transport | | 2 | |
| Dornier 228 | Germany | transport | | 1 | One crashed in June 2024. |
Helicopters
| Eurocopter AS350 | France | light utility | | 2 | |
| Eurocopter AS355 | France | utility | | 1 | |
| Eurocopter AS532 | France | transport | | 1 | |
| Aérospatiale Gazelle | France | scout / anti-armor | SA341 | 2 | |
| Aérospatiale SA330 | France | utility | | 2 | |

=== Retired aircraft ===
Previous aircraft that have been placed in storage or removed from service include the Basler BT-67, the Dornier Do27-A, the British Aerospace 125, the King Air 90, AS365 Dauphin, and the Alouette III.

== Navy ==
As a landlocked country, Malawi has a very small Navy with no sizeable military craft. Malawi's naval force only operates on Lake Malawi and is based at Monkey Bay. The Malawi Navy was organized in the early 1970s, with the help of the Navy of Portugal that ceded part of its boats of the Nyassa Flotilla operating from the then Portuguese province of Mozambique. In some cases, the gunboats of the Malawian Navy were initially crewed by Portuguese. In 2007, the navy had 220 personnel, and operated the following vessels:

- Patrol boats
  - 1 Namacurra-class harbour patrol boat (P 704 Kaning'a, formerly Y 1520), transferred from South Africa in 1988
  - 1 (French) Antares-class (not to mix with Soviet Muravey-class) patrol boat (P 703 Kasungu, formerly Chikala), out of service since 1993
- Service craft
  - 1 unknown-type Landing Craft Mechanized (P 702 Chikoko I), date of entry into service unknown
  - 12 Buccaneer Inflatables Buccaneer Legend-type rigid-hulled inflatable launches, in service since 1993

== See also ==
- Nyasaland in World War II
- Malawi Armed Forces College FC
- Kamuzu Barracks FC, Lilongwe
