= Chisiza =

Chisiza is a Chewa surname. Notable people with the surname include:

- Du Chisiza (1963–1999), Malawian playwright, director and actor
- Dunduzu Chisiza (1930–1962), Rhodesian politician
- Yatuta Chisiza (1926–1967), Malawian politician
