= Commander of the Defence Force (Malawi) =

Highest-ranking military officer in the Malawian Defence Force

- Incumbent; General George Jafu since 5 October 2025
- Reports to: Minister of Defence
- Appointer: President
- Formation: 15 May 1971
- First holder: Graciano Matewere
- Website: Official website

The Commander of the Malawi Defence Force is the highest-ranking military officer in the Malawian Defence Force and is responsible for maintaining control over the three service branches of the military.

== List of officeholders ==
No.	Portrait	Name (birth–death)	Term of office			Ref.
No.	Portrait	Name (birth–death)	Took office	Left office	Time in office	Ref.
1		General; Graciano Matewere (born ?)	15 May 1971	9 April 1980	8 years, 330 days	
2		General; Melvin Khanga (born ?)	9 April 1980	10 June 1992	12 years, 62 days	
3		General; Isaac Yohane (born ?)	10 June 1992	10 December 1993	1 year, 183 days	
4		General; Dismus Maulana (born ?)	10 December 1993	15 June 1994	187 days	
5		General; Manken Chigawa (?–1995)	15 June 1994	18 April 1995 X	307 days	
6		Major General; Owen Binauli (?–1998)	26 April 1995	30 September 1996	1 year, 165 days	
7		General; Kelvin Simwaka (born ?)	30 September 1996	16 January 1998	1 year, 108 days	
8		Lieutenant General; Joseph Chimbayo (born ?)	16 January 1998	13 July 2004	6 years, 179 days	
9		General; Marko Chiziko (born 1952)	13 July 2004	22 July 2011	7 years, 9 days	
10		General; Henry Odillo (born ?)	22 July 2011	4 August 2014	3 years, 13 days	
11		General; Ignasio Maulana (born ?)	4 August 2014	31 July 2016	1 year, 362 days	
12		General; Griffin Supuni Phiri (born ?)	25 August 2016	9 August 2019	2 years, 349 days	
13		General; Vincent Nundwe (born ?)	9 August 2019	17 March 2020	221 days	
14		General; Peter Namathanga (born ?)	17 March 2020	25 September 2020	192 days	
13		General; Vincent Nundwe (born ?)	25 September 2020	13 July 2023	2 years, 291 days	
15		General; Paul Valentino Phiri (born 1972)	13 July 2023	5 October 2025	2 years, 84 days	
16		General; George Jafu (born 1962)	5 October 2025	Incumbent	337 days	
