= Africa Peacekeeping Program =

U.S. government program

The Africa Peacekeeping Program (AFRICAP) is a U.S. Government program run by the Bureau of African Affairs of the U.S. Department of State "which provides training and advisory services, equipment procurement, and logistical support and construction services to African countries."

== See also ==
- African Contingency Operations Training and Assistance
