= Marko Chiziko =

Malawian military officer

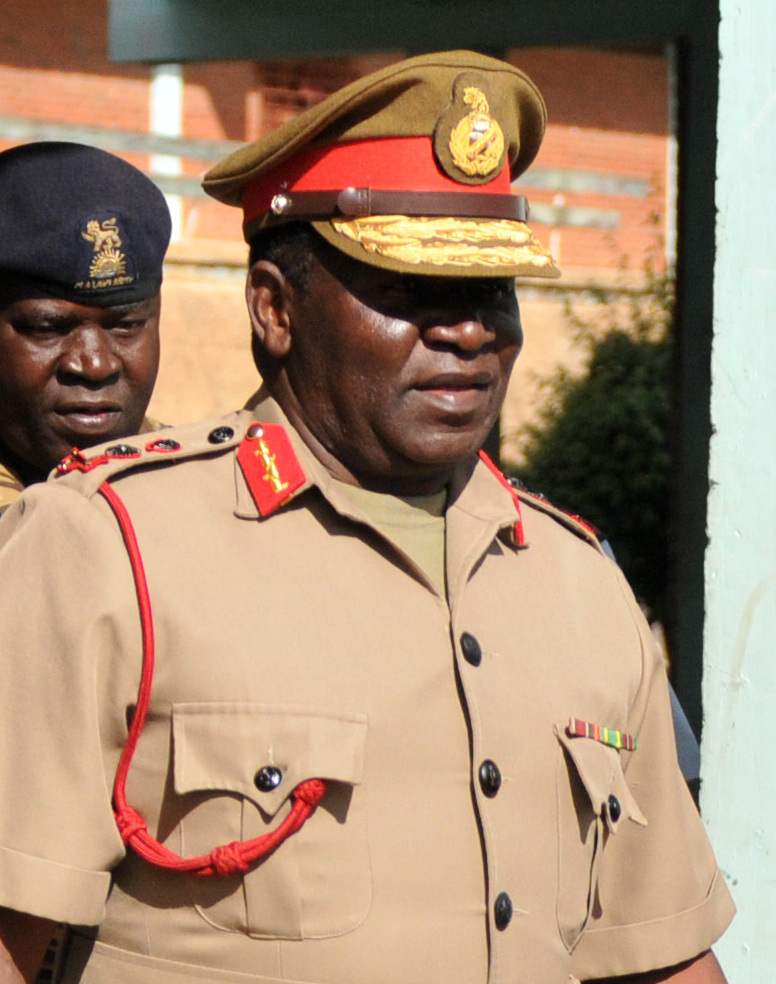
Image of Gen. Marko Chiziko

Marko Chiziko (born on April 17, 1952) was the former Commander of the Malawian Defence Force (MDF). He was born in Dowa at Chiziko Village, Chakhaza Traditional authority.

He was the Commander for the Army from 2004 until 2011 for President Bingu wa Mutharika. His deputy was Ernest Ntonya. He played a leading role in the participation of the Malawi Army in the African Crisis Response Initiative (ACRI) and Africa Contingency Operations Training Assistance (ACOTA). He was replaced by General Henry Odillo in 2011.

After serving as the Commander General of the MDF he was appointed as National Security Advisor in the Bingu wa Mutharika administration on July 23, 2011, a new position that began with his appointment. He was appointed by Joyce Banda as the Presidential Advisor on security in March 2013.

== Career ==
He obtained a Malawi School Certificate of Education at Dedza Secondary School.

He enlisted in the Army in 1972 and moved up the ranks. He became Lieutenant, Captain, Major, LT Colonel, Colonel. He attended several courses during his early army career. He attended the Army Command and General Staff Course in 1988/1989 in the USA. He then served as Brigadier, Major General, LT General and General. He has extensive training in the Army having been trained in Malawi, the UK, Netherlands, Botswana, South Africa and the United States. He is also a holder of a Masters in Strategic Planning and Management (2003) Derby University, UK; in correspondence through Malawi Institute of Management. He has written a few articles about defence and security as part of his PhD thesis.

== Personal life ==
He is married and has 7 children.

Political offices
Preceded by General Joseph Chimbayo	Commander of the Malawian Defence Force	Succeeded by General Henry Odillo
