= George Jafu =

Commander of the Malawi Defence Force

George Alexander Jafu
- Born: November 19, 1962 (age 63); Mpondasi Village, Traditional Authority Mponda, Mangochi District, Malaŵi
- Allegiance: Malawi
- Branch: Malawi Defence Force
- Service years: 1988–present
- Rank: General
- Commands: Chief of Defence (Commander of the Malawi Defence Force)
- Education: University of Derby (Master’s in Strategic Management)

Lieutenant General George Alexander Jafu is a Malawian military officer who serves as the Commander of the Malawi Defence Force (MDF). He was appointed Chief of Defence in October 2025, succeeding General Valentino Phiri.

== Early life and education ==
George Alexander Jafu was born on 19 November 1962 in Mpondasi Village, Traditional Authority Mponda, in the Mangochi District of southern Malawi. He holds a Master’s Degree in Strategic Management from the University of Derby in the United Kingdom. Jafu has also attended multiple military and staff training programmes, including courses in joint operations planning and United Nations military observer missions.

== Career ==
=== Military ===
Jaffu joined the Malawi Defence Force in 1988. He has held several positions including Inspector General of the Malawi Defence Force, Chief of Staff at the Joint Headquarters and Military Adviser to Malawi’s United Nations mission in New York. In May 2024, he was promoted from Major General to Lieutenant General and appointed Deputy Commander of the Malawi Defence Force.

=== Appointment as Commander ===
In October 2025, President Peter Mutharika appointed Jafu as the new Chief of Defence, replacing General Valentino Phiri.
