= Gertrude Webster Kamkwatira =

Malawian theatre director and actor (1966 – 2006)

- Born: Malawi
- Occupations: Director, actress, playwright
- Years active: 1966 - 2006

Gertrude Webster Kamkwatira (c. 1966 – 2006) was a Malawian playwright, director and actress.

== Life ==
Kamkwatira was born in about 1966. She became director of the Wakhumbata Ensemble Theatre in 1999 after the death of its founder, Du Chisiza. Later she "defected" from that group and formed the theatre group Wanna-Do. Positions she held included President of the National Theatre Association of Malawi and Chairperson of the Copyright Society of Malawi.

Kamkwatira wrote about thirteen plays in English, including It's My Fault, which deals with domestic violence and sexual oppression, Jesus' Retrial and Breaking the News, a play about contending with AIDS. In an interview in 2003, she said that she would normally spend one or two days writing a play, then continue working on it for a further three weeks. Next she would discuss it with an editor before presenting it to the cast. Each actor should then read and understand the play as the first step in the rehearsal process.

Her acting career began when there were not many women performers in Malawi. In 1987 she had to take roles in three plays concurrently because Wakhumbata had so few actresses.

== Death ==
She died of malaria at the age of 40, in 2006. She was buried at her home in Lisungwi, Neno district.
