= Henry Odillo =

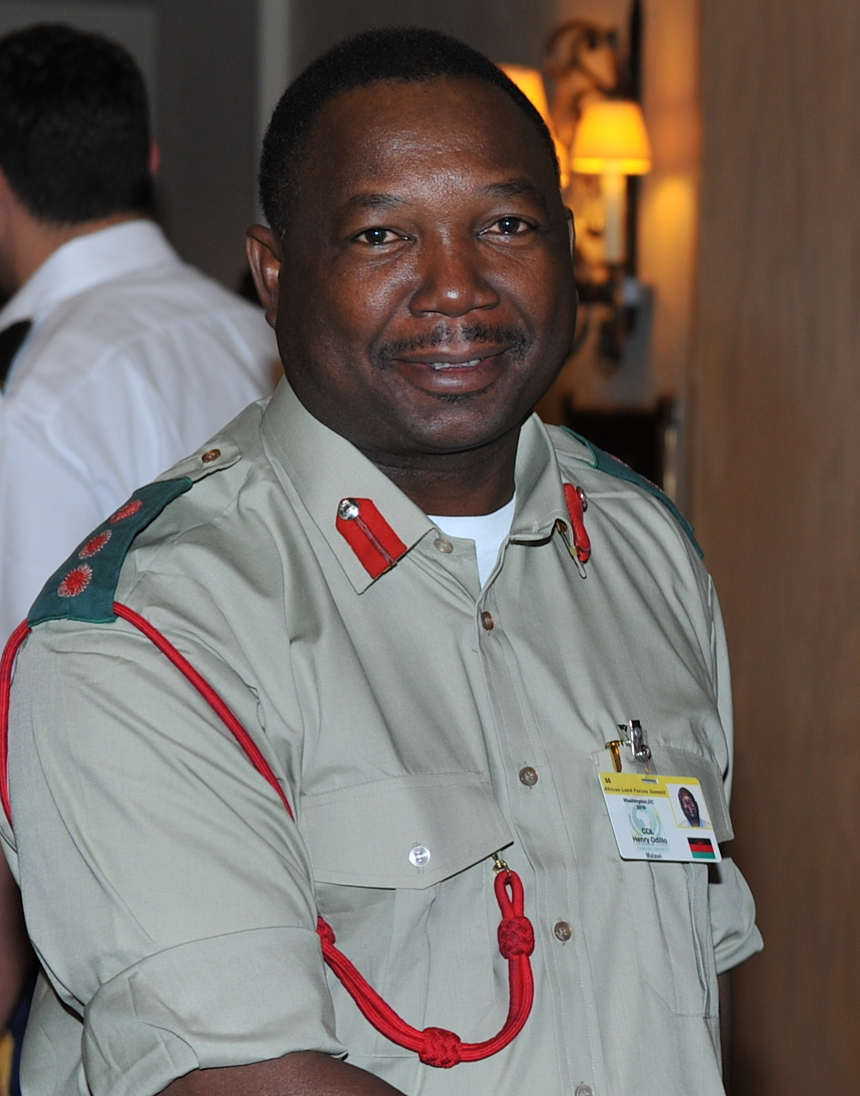
- Allegiance: MWI
- Branch: Malawi Army
- Rank: General
- Commands: Malawi Defence Force

General Henry Odillo was the Commander of the Malawian Defence Force. He was appointed as the commander General of Malawi defence force in July 2011 after the nationwide protests against Bingu wa Mutharika's presidency in which wa Mutharika accused the organizers of the protest of plotting a coup against him. He replaced General Marko Chiziko. Prior to this appointment he served as the military attache at the Malawi High Commission in London. General Odillo was dismissed by Malawi's new President Arthur Mutharika in June 2014. President Mutharika promoted Major-General Ignacio Maulana to the rank of General and appointed him the new Commander of the Army.

== Constitutional Coup 2012 ==
Odillo has been much lauded for the role he played in the 2012 Malawian constitutional crisis in which an attempt to cover up the death of President Bingu wa Mutharika in order to stop vice-president Joyce Banda from becoming president. When approached by top officials in the government with regards to taking over the government while the succession to the presidency was decided, Odillo noted that there was no constitutional provision that allowed the army to take over and that the constitution would need to be followed. He noted that he could not support an 'illegal government'.

== Accolades ==
He was voted as the Nyasatimes 'man of the year' in 2012 for the role he played in averting the coup and supporting a democratic transition of power.

Political offices
| Preceded by Marko Chiziko | Commander of the Malawian Defence Force; 2011-2014 | Succeeded by General Ignacio Maulana |
