= Paul Valentino Phiri =

Malawian military commander officer

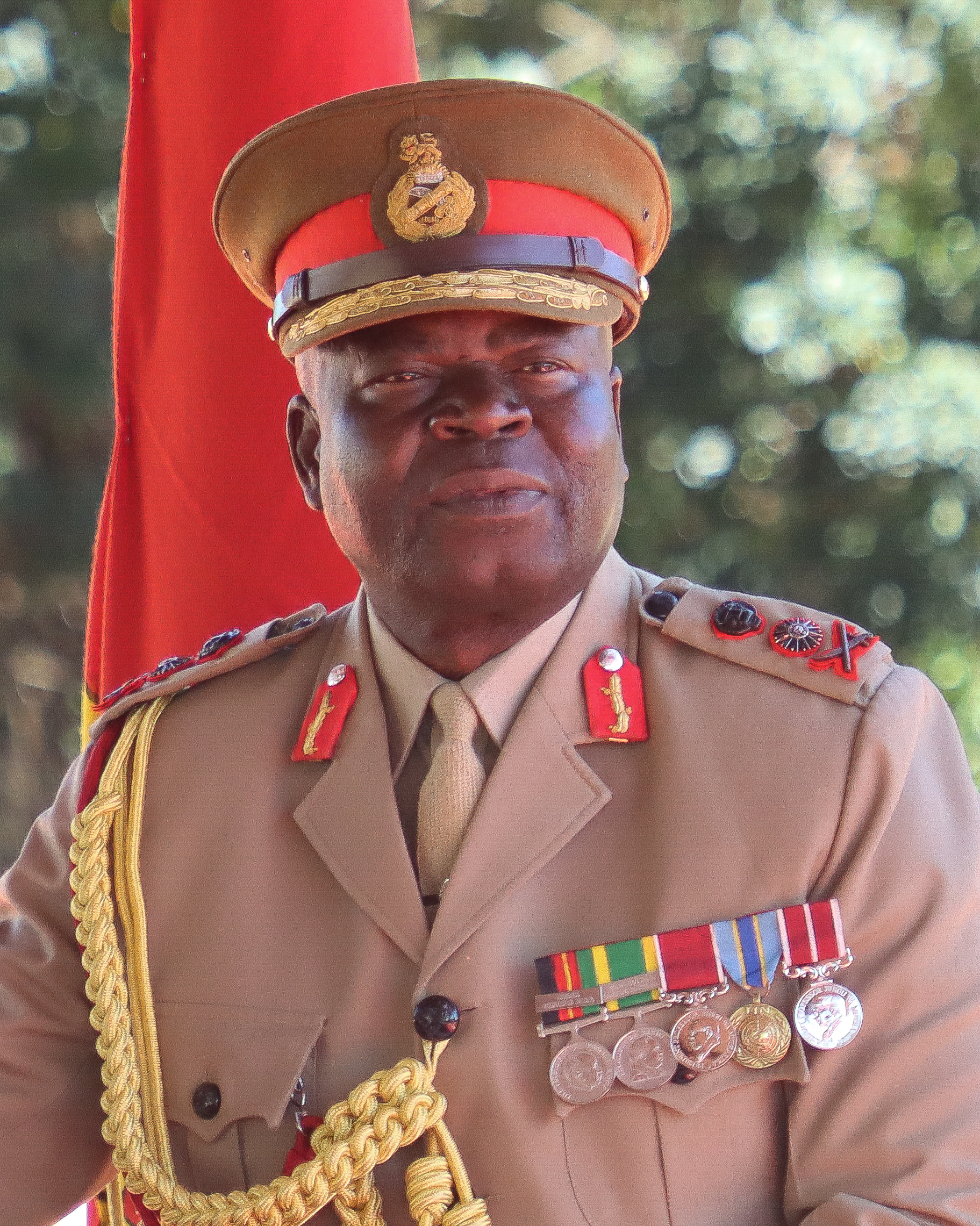
- Phiri in 2024

Commander of the Malawian Defence Force
- Incumbent
- Assumed office July 2023
- Appointed by: Lazarus Chakwera
- President: Lazarus Chakwera
- Vice President: Saulos Chilima
- Preceding: Vincent Nundwe

Personal details
- Born: August 24, 1972 (age 54) Blantyre, Malawi
- Party: Malawi Congress Party
- Occupation: Soldier

Paul Valentino Phiri is a Malawian military officer who was appointed as the Commander of the Malawian Defence Force (MDF) in July 2023 by President Lazarus Chakwera. He became the first officer from the Army's Infantry Corps to lead the MDF.

== Background ==
=== Early life and career ===
Phiri was born on 24 August in 1972 in Blantyre, Malawi. He has served in the Malawi Defence Force for many years, holding various positions before becoming the Deputy Commander.

He was appointed as the Commander of the MDF in July 2023, replacing General Vincent Nundwe who served as the Commander of the Malawi Defence Force (MDF) from 2019 to 2023, appointed by former President Peter Mutharika. He retired from the military in July 2023.

Phiri served as the Deputy Commander of the MDF under General Vincent Nundwe. He was appointed as the Commander of the MDF in July 2023 by President Lazarus Chakwera, succeeding General Vincent Nundwe.

== Allegations and arrest ==
Phiri has been under investigation by the Anti-Corruption Bureau (ACB) of Malawi since June 2023 for his involvement in a financial misconduct case. He is accused of misusing K38.5 millions of taxpayers’ money and coercing an accountant to authorize the payment.

On 1 October 2026, the ACB announced that Phiri was arrested over his involvement in illegal arms trafficking in June and July 2025, reportedly to Sudanese rebels amid a civil war in the country. He was charged five counts pertaining to abuse of his office and "dealing in terrorist property".

== See also ==
- Malawi Defence Force
