= Attati Mpakati =

Malawian politician

Attati Mpakati (died 24 March 1983 in Harare, Zimbabwe) was a Malawian dissident and - following the death of Yatuta Chisiza - leader of the Socialist League of Malawi (LESOMA) from 1975 until his death. He was killed by a letter bomb while in exile in Zimbabwe. It is widely suspected that the parcel was sent by agents of President Hastings Banda of Malawi.

Mpakati had survived a similar attack in 1979, which President Banda admitted ordering. After this first attack, which crippled both of his hands, Mpakati, together with his wife and children, first flew to London for medical treatment and then tried without success to fly to East Berlin to meet with the exiled LESOMA representative for Eastern Europe Mahoma M. Mwaungulu.

== Literature ==
Searle, Chris: Struggling against the "Bandastan": an interview with Attati Mpakati. Race & Class 1980, 21: 389-401
