= Military ranks of Malawi =

The Military ranks of Malawi are the military insignia used by the Malawian Defence Force. Being a former British protectorate, Malawi shares a rank structure similar to that of the United Kingdom.

== Commissioned officer ranks ==
The rank insignia of commissioned officers.

Rank group	General / flag officers				Senior officers			Junior officers
Malawi Army
Malawi Army	General	Lieutenant general	Major general	Brigadier	Colonel	Lieutenant colonel	Major	Captain	Lieutenant	Second lieutenant
Malawi Navy
Malawi Navy	General	Lieutenant general	Major general	Brigadier general	Colonel	Lieutenant colonel	Major	Captain	First lieutenant	Second lieutenant
Malawi Air Force
Malawi Air Force	General	Lieutenant general	Major general	Brigadier general	Colonel	Lieutenant colonel	Major	Captain	First lieutenant	Second lieutenant
Rank group	General / flag officers				Senior officers			Junior officers

== Other ranks ==
The rank insignia of non-commissioned officers and enlisted personnel.

Rank group	Senior NCOs				Junior NCOs		Enlisted
Malawi Army							No insignia
Malawi Army	Warrant officer class 1	Warrant officer class 2	Staff sergeant	Sergeant	Corporal	Lance corporal	Private (or equivalent)
Malawi Navy							No insignia
Malawi Navy	Warrant officer class 1	Warrant officer class 2	Staff sergeant	Sergeant	Corporal	Lance corporal	Private (or equivalent)
Malawi Air Force							No insignia
Malawi Air Force	Warrant officer class 1	Warrant officer class 2	Staff sergeant	Sergeant	Corporal	Lance corporal	Private (or equivalent)
Rank group	Senior NCOs				Junior NCOs		Enlisted
