= Mahoma Mwakipunda Mwaungulu =

Malawian politician and freedom fighter

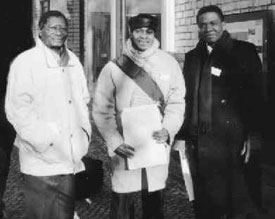
- Mahoma Mwaungulu, Ian Douglas, and Moses Mensah, members of the Pan African Forum e.V. Berlin, 1999

Economic Advisor
- In office 1964–1964
- President: Hastings Banda

Personal details
- Born: Mahoma Mwaungulu; 3 January 1932 Tanganyika
- Died: 2004 Berlin
- Citizenship: Malawian
- Party: Malawi Congress Party; Socialist League of Malawi
- Spouse: Gisela Mwaungulu (m. 1961; div. 1979)
- Education: Aggrey Memorial School, Uganda; Accra Academy
- Alma mater: Stockholm University; Leipzig University
- Occupation: Economist; Politician

Mahoma Mwaungulu (3 January 1932 Tanzania - 2004 Berlin) was a Pan African politician. He was one of the major leaders in the German-African community before and after the reunification of Germany.

== Biography ==
=== Early life and education ===
Mahoma Mwaungulu was born on 3 January 1932 in the former British colony of Tanganyika, now known as Tanzania, the son of two Ngonde from Nyasaland, now known as Malawi. He carried the traditional hereditary title of Mwakipunda, as a member of the council of nobles responsible for choosing the king of Malawi from among a number of eligible members of traditional royal families.

In 1949, at the age of 17, Mwaungulu entered primary school for the first time in Nyasaland (present-day Malawi) in Karonga, his home district located on the northwestern shore of Lake Nyasa, near the Tanganyikan border. Four years earlier, around the age of twelve, he transferred to the Overtoun Institution, a prestigious boarding school in Livingstonia founded by Scottish missionaries in the late nineteenth century. There, he completed the 6th grade and received his primary school leaving certificate. However, he was informed by the missionaries that he could not advance to secondary school due to his late entry into primary education and his current age.

Mwaungulu believed that the missionaries' rationale concerning his age was merely a pretext, arguing that he was deemed too politically engaged by them. According to Mwaungulu, the missionaries sought to restrict his political development by steering him toward theological studies, with the aim of preparing him for a career as a primary school teacher. Dissatisfied with this path, Mwaungulu decided to discontinue his studies and moved to Uganda to enroll in a private school.

He attended the Aggrey Memorial School, located in Bunnamwaya, north of Lake Victoria near Kampala, the capital of Uganda, and over 1,500 kilometers from his home district of Karonga. During his time at Aggrey Memorial School, approximately half of the students were from other East and Central African countries. However, the school's location was afflicted by tropical diseases, and Mwaungulu contracted malaria and dysentery from contaminated water, necessitating his return to Nyasaland in 1951.

Mwaungulu became politically active in his student days in Africa. He was imprisoned for a year for being part of a resistance movement in Southern Rhodesia, (now Zimbabwe). As a member of the Youth League of the Nyasaland African Congress, he received a recommendation to study in Ghana, and he subsequently crossed the continent on foot from Tanzania to Ghana to meet Kwame Nkrumah and George Padmore. Supported by the Convention People's Party, Mwaungulu attended Accra Academy, a boys' boarding school providing secondary education and assistance to financially needy students. During his time in Ghana, Mwaungulu developed an appreciation for his European bourgeois education blended with by a distinctly political and African perspective. This dual influence was due to his involvement in the National Association of Socialist Students' Organisation, aligned with the then Ghanaian President Kwame Nkrumah. He received a stipend to study in the German Democratic Republic, and from 1960 to 1964 he studied economics at Leipzig, at the Karl Marx University. As a student, he remained engaged in African politics and headed the African student party. Shortly after finishing his exams and before leaving to the newly independent Malawi, a racist assault was committed on him by three German students. It is documented in a German publication on migration in the GDR.

=== Political activity in Africa ===
After completing his education, he was invited to return to Malawi to work as an economist for the Hastings Banda government. During this time, he was active in the Pan African liberation fight against colonialism. He met Che Guevara during his venture in the Democratic Republic of the Congo. As a result of the Malawian cabinet crisis which turned Malawi into a dictatorship, he was later placed under house arrest and the Banda regime planned his murder, but he was able to escape to Tanzania with the aid of friends, and later returned to the East Germany where he settled in 1967.

=== Political activity in the German Democratic Republic (GDR) ===
Mwaungulu returned to the GDR as a member of the steering committee of the Socialist League of Malawi (LESOMA), the most important oppositional Malawian party led by Attati Mkapati. The party was founded in Tanzania by Yatuta Chisiza, another exiled member of the former Malawian cabinet. Out of his own exile in the GDR, Mwaungulu became the representative of LESOMA for Eastern Europe and organized their support by the solidarity-committee of the GDR. At least two editions of "Kuchanso", the political program of LESOMA, were printed in East Berlin and transferred from there to Tanzania, from where it was smuggled into Malawi. But the GDR stopped the support at the end of the 1970th, probably because of its economic cooperation with Mozambique. Holding on to his political ideals, the GDR had to expel Mwaungulu from her territory in 1982 to keep him from political action. Up from this moment he became the representative of LESOMA in Western Europe. He also forced juridically the West German government to recognize him as the first Malawian refugee of Western Germany, a country that supported the Banda-Regime. In East Berlin he had also written on his doctoral thesis. He could not finish it because the GDR canceled his stipend.

=== Community activities in Berlin-Kreuzberg ===
He worked, taught and held speeches in several circumstances in both the GDR and in the Federal Republic of Germany. He married a German woman, and had three children.

In the late 1980s Mwaungulu became critical of the East German government and moved to West Berlin. There he lived in the multicultural Kreuzberg district and continued working for the integration of Africans and other migrants into German society. Cosmopolitan as he was, his comment on the increasing racism in the reunited Germany found its way into a Malaysian newspaper: "East Germany made it a crime to even be a racist. When the communists went away, so did that law. In West Germany, I don`t know. I think the government has always tolerated racism." In 1997, he co-founded the Pan-African Forum e.V with Wilfred Imoudu, another Pan African intellectual and activist who had studied in the GDR in the 1960s, and was the son of an important Nigerian trade unionist.

Mwaungulu died in 2004 at the age of 72, in the Urban Krankenhaus in Berlin Kreuzberg. During the Berlin Black History Month in 2009, a tribute to his memory was made by school friend and compatriot, Knollys Mwanyongo, and by Wilfred Imoudu.
