= Du Chisiza =

Malawian playwright and politician

Dunduzu Chisiza Jr.
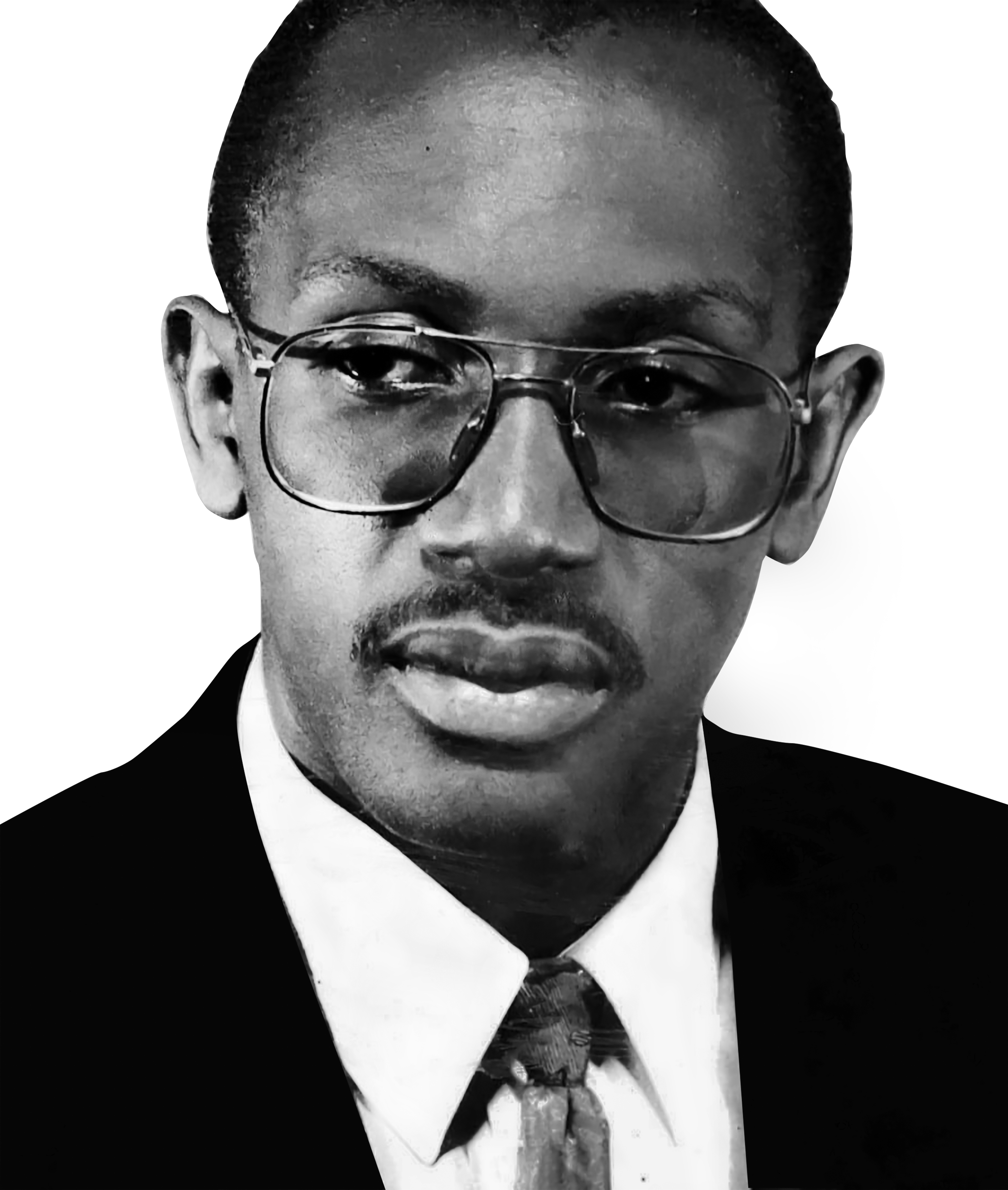
- In office 1993 – 24 May 1994
- In office 1983–1999
- Preceded by: Gertrude Webster Kamkwatira

Personal details
- Born: 26 March 1963
- Died: 24 February 1999 (aged 35)
- Spouse: Ngongite Mwafulirwa (m. 1993)
- Children: Thlupego Chisiza
- Parent: Dunduzu Chisiza (father) Bazuka Mhango (stepfather)
- Relatives: Yatuta Chisiza (uncle)

Dunduzu Chisiza Junior (26 March 1963 – 24 February 1999) was a Malawian politician, playwright, director and actor and founder of the first professional theatre company in Malawi, the Wakhumbata Ensemble Theatre. He wrote more than 20 plays and was involved in the writing and directing of some 25 others. Many of his plays had a political and human rights message during the one party state under Banda. He was the son of the prominent Malawian activist and politician Dunduzu Chisiza.

== Early life ==
Chisiza was the third son of Dunduzu K. Chisiza, a prominent activist of Malawian Independence who was killed in 1962 six months before Du's birth. His uncle, Yatuta Chisiza, was also a nationalist involved in politics, serving as bodyguard to Banda during the struggle for independence. He was killed following independence during an attempted take-over of the Presidency in 1967.

Chisiza became interested in drama at the Henry Henderson Institute in Blantyre as a secondary school student. He wrote and directed 'The Deceased's Attack', which won first prize at the National Schools Drama Festival in 1982. He later moved to the US and was awarded a BFA in Performing Arts at the Philadelphia College of the Performing Arts. He also became a martial arts enthusiast obtaining a black belt and becoming an instructor at the Philadelphia Arts Centre. He returned to Malawi soon after graduation.

== Wakhumbata Workshop Theatre ==
In 1983, he formed the Wakhumbata Workshop Theatre before he went to the U.S. Wakhumbata in Chichewa and Tumbuka means among them "one who hugs", "one who hatches eggs" and "those who grieve". This workshop helped develop the performing arts in Malawi. After Du Chisiza's death from an illness the theatre was led by Gertrude Webster Kamkwatira.

== Author and playwright ==
Du Junior was Malawi's best known playwright. He wrote about controversial topics in Malawi during one party rule and during multi party rule. He was a fearless writer that dared to write about controversial topics that many would not dare to during the Banda regime. One of his popular works includes Fragments, which he produced after he returned from the U.S. and after learning that he would need to do much of his work abstract in order to get his message across without being banned. Another play, Tatuya Futi was a tribute to his uncle Yatuta Chisiza. Other plays include Papa's Empire, Phumashakire, De Summer Blow, Sir Daniels, Storm On Litada, Operation Tidy, Kabuha Tragedy, Mitsidi Burning, Black Cross, Black Blawizo, and Democracy Boulevard. He was best known for his abstract themed political plays but continued to write and produce during his political career.

== Political career ==
His plays ranged over a variety of controversial issues that led to some of them being banned by the Banda regime. He began to use artistic talent to disguise his themes. He became very popular for his works of political criticism.

In a surprising move, in 1993, he agreed to take on the post of Minister for Sports, Youth and Culture in one of Banda's last cabinets before multiparty elections in 1994. His play Democracy Boulevard commented on the abuses associated with the democratic process, it was particularly hard hitting on the media coverage associated with a multi-party democracy. In the months preceding the first multi-party elections, he was courted by each of the three major political parties. He announced his withdrawal from active politics in 1994 after the MCP was defeated. In 1998 he joined the ruling party, UDF. He announced his candidacy to stand as parliamentary candidate for Karonga South but died prior to the elections.

== Works ==
- The Deceased's Attack (1982) – A political rewriting of the Hamlet story meant to comment on the belief that his father's death was caused by the Banda camp. In the plot a son avenges his father's death.
- Fragments (1987) performed at the French Cultural Centre (FCC).
- Me Nobody Knows and Tears of Blood (late Eighties)
- Papa's Empire (1990) – A play about the corruption of a private empire meant to highlight the misguidance of Bandas MCP.
- Educating Mwalimu (1991) – A play about love, marriage and "the new woman", was shortlisted in a BBC playwriting contest.
- Barefoot in the Heart (1992) – A play about race relations and Pan-Africanism.
- Democracy Boulevard (1993) – A satire about some of the abuses associated with multi-party democracy in relation to the media.
- De Summer Blow (1994) – A play about politics and society in the post-Banda era.

=== Films ===
- To Ndirande Mountain With Love *

== Personal life ==
He was married to Ngongite Mwafulirwa in 1993 and had three children with her. His stepfather is Bazuka Mhango. His son, Thlupego Chisiza is also a dramatist and was arrested in 2011 for staging a play critical of the government which was co-written by Robert Chasowa.
