= Jumbes of Nkhotakota =

The Jumbes of Nkhotakota were a dynasty of Swahili Arab traders based in Nkhotakota, on the western shore of Lake Malawi. They were running an East-West caravan trade, exchanging cloths from the Swahili coast for ivory and slaves. They introduced the Muslim faith and culture in the Nkhotakota area and were the first to grow rice and coconuts in the region.

== History ==
The founder of the dynasty, Salim bin Abdallah, arrived at Nkhotakota around 1840. He was an Arab from Zanzibar and had previously been involved in slave and ivory trade at Ujiji and Tabora in nowadays Tanzania. He asked the local Chewa chiefs for some land to establish a trading post. He was able to build his power by building dhows that enabled merchants to trade goods across the lake and because he possessed firearms with which he could protect the lake populations against the Ngoni invasions.

The Jumbes brought some 20000 slaves yearly to the port of Kilwa in nowadays Tanzania. The captives were kept in Nkhotakota until there was 1000 of them. They were then shipped across Lake Malawi and forced to walk for three to four month till they arrived to the Kilwa slave market where they were sold. The Scottish explorer and missionary David Livingstone witnessed this slave trade when he visited Nkhotakota in 1861. In 1864, he established a treaty with the Jumbe and the Chew chiefs to put an end to the slave trade. However, it was to no avail and the trade continued.

The Jumbes also engaged in ivory trade. They employed local hunters to collect ivory from the hills west of Nkhotakota. By 1889, the slave trade had faded and the Jumbe derived most of his revenue from the ivory trade. His hunters radiated in every direction from central Malawi. As the Jumbe chiefdom was on the same ivory trade route than the Mwase chiefdom, there was significant infighting between both.

He won a large personal following that he established in villages ruled by his headmen. He insisted that his followers, mainly Yao traders and Chewa refugees, convert to Islam. Ultimately, Salim bin Abdallah set himself as Sultan of Marimba expressing his allegiance for the Sultan of Zanzibar. The Jumbes (meaning "Prince") established their power though indirect rule, relying on the authority of local Chewa chiefs. They did not attempt to convert theirs subjects. However, to promote the chiefs loyalty, they encouraged them to send their male offspring to the Sultanate of Zanzibar so that they would receive an Islamic education.

At the end of the 19th century, Nkhotakota had become a thriving trade center of 6000 inhabitants. It was the main Islamic outpost in Nyassaland, rice cultivation had been extended along the lake shore.

The power of the Jumbes remained unchallenged until Henry Hamilton Johnston asserted the authority of the British Central Africa Protectorate in this area. He undertook significant efforts to put an end to the slave trade. He attacked the last Jumbe with a Sikh force in 1894 was tried and exiled to Zanzibar.

== Landmarks ==
Some heritage sites of the Jumbes of Nkhotakota can bee seen in Malawi. They include the first mosque built in the country, the graves of the three first Jumbes as well as their lieutenants' graves. The fig trees under which the Jumbe and Livingstone met and agreed to discontinue the slave trade can still be seen.
