= African Contingency Operations Training and Assistance =

US military training program

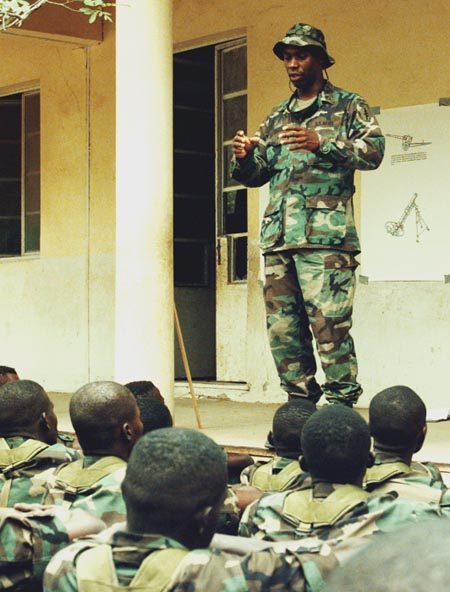
American soldier instructing Senegalese soldiers on U.N. peacekeeping policies during training for the African Crisis Response Initiative in Thiès, Senegal.

The African Contingency Operations Training and Assistance (ACOTA) program, formerly the African Crisis Response Initiative (ACRI), is a United States program to train military trainers and equip African national militaries to conduct peace support operations and humanitarian relief.

The ACOTA program, which succeeded ACRI in 2004, aims to increase the capabilities of African military forces in areas such as human rights, interaction with civil society, international law, military staff skills, and small unit operations. Over 40,000 African soldiers will be trained in peacekeeping over five years. The African Contingency Operations Training and Assistance program has a record of supporting African military forces that have afterwards participated in peacekeeping or peace support activities in the continent. The program is funded by the US Department of State peacekeeping operations account.

== Establishment of the ACRI ==
In October 1996, during the Clinton administration, The U.S. government established the African Crisis Response Initiative (ACRI) force, to enable timely response to humanitarian crises and empower peacekeeping missions on the African continent.

The ACRI's immediate objective was to increase the number of African states with effective response capability for peacekeeping and humanitarian relief challenges, thereby improving stability and peace within their own borders and their sub-regions. The pressing reason for establishing the ACRI at the time had been the imminent possibility of a major genocide in Burundi, similar to the ethnic cleansing which had taken place in 1994 in Rwanda. However, once the ACRI was formed, these murders continued, yet the force never officially intervened. Until its replacement by ACOTA by the ACRI in 2004 and despite ongoing mass murders occurring in the Darfur province of the Sudan, the U.S. government never deployed the ACRI forces to put pause to genocide in Africa. Despite the ACRI’s founding articles which call for humanitarian intervention in Africa, no action was taken.

== Controversies ==
The harrowing losses of the U.S. military in Somalia were instrumental in the creation of the ACRI. In 1992, following the fall of the Siad Barre regime, the U.S. opted for a military intervention which it named Restore Hope but the operation soon escalated when the focus shifted from humanitarian aid to an attempt at restructuring Somalia’s government. By 1993 following the Battle of Mogadishu (1993), portrayed in the book and movie Black Hawk Down, the mission in Somalia was considered a failure. The Clinton administration was criticised for the operation's outcome, primarily due to the decision to abandon the region before completing the operation's humanitarian and security objectives, and for their failure to recognize the threat Al-Qaida elements posed in Somalia as well as to U.S. security interests at home.

This off-shot was that the U.S. State Department pressured the UN against intervening in the 1994 Rwandan genocide Even as the graphic violence dominated the world press, the U.S. government was refusing to acknowledge that a genocide had taken place. African leaders including South African President Nelson Mandela considered the formation of the ACRI as a cynical attempt by the U.S. to improve its image following the Rwandan genocide. The United States which had been willing to mobilize the United Nations to stop ethnic cleansing in European Bosnia has ensured that the UN did not send troops to end the Rwandan genocide in 1994.

The Organization of African Unity (OAU) convened a panel of experts to investigate the genocide in Rwanda. They concluded that during the civil war, genocide had occurred, and pointed to the tolerance for genocidal violence committed by African leaders. By naming their report "Rwanda: The Preventable Genocide", the panel pointed to the United States and UN as responsible for this tragedy. Regional leaders such as Michel Micombero of Burundi, Idi Amin of Uganda, Emperor Bokassa of the Central African Republic and Mobutu of Zaire directly and indirectly contributed to the commencement war and genocide by taking a stance of indifference toward state-implemented criminal recommendation which had exploited myths of Tutsi and Hutu origins.

== Participating countries ==
ACOTA's 25 partners included Benin, Botswana, Burkina Faso, Burundi, Cameroon, Djibouti, Ethiopia, Gabon, Ghana, Kenya, Malawi, Mali, Mauritania, Mozambique, Namibia, Niger, Nigeria, Rwanda, Senegal, Sierra Leone, South Africa, Tanzania, Togo, Uganda, and Zambia.

== See also ==
- Africa Peacekeeping Program
