= Timeline of Lilongwe =

The following is a timeline of the history of the city of Lilongwe, Malawi.

== 20th century ==
- 1902 – Local leader Njewa sets up a boma named after the Lilongwe River.
- 1904 – Lilongwe becomes administrative seat of British colonial Nyasaland Protectorate.
- 1905 – Road built to Dedza.
- 1906 – "Asian traders" arrive.
- 1909 – Road built to Fort Jameson and Fort Manning.
- 1910 – Administrative Lilongwe District created.
- 1923 – Diamphwe Bridge built.
- 1930 – Imperial Tobacco Company manufactory begins operating.
- 1944 – European School founded.
- 1949 – Odini Catholic newspaper begins publication.
- 1959 – Roman Catholic diocese of Lilongwe established.
- 1963 – Lilongwe Technical College founded.
- 1964 – Lilongwe becomes part of independent Malawi.
- 1966 – Population: 19,425.
- 1967 – University of Malawi's Bunda College of Agriculture active.
- 1968 – Capitol City Development Corporation formed; Lilongwe "development as the new national capital" begins.
- 1975 – Capital of Malawi moved to Lilongwe from Zomba.
- 1977
  - Silver Strikers F.C. (football club) formed.
  - Population: 98,718.
- 1979 – University of Malawi's Kamuzu College of Nursing established.
- 1983 – Lilongwe International Airport opens.
- 1987 – Population: 233,973.
- 1989 – Lilongwe National Botanic Garden founded.
- 1992 – May: Anti-government protest.
- 1997 – Media Institute of Southern Africa Malawi chapter headquartered in city.
- 1998 – Population: 440,471.

== 21st century ==
- 2003 – Population: 632,867 in city; 1,087,917 urban agglomeration (estimate).
- 2005
  - National government administration moved to Lilongwe from Blantyre.
  - Banda Mausoleum erected.
- 2007
  - Lilongwe Wildlife Centre founded.
  - Memorial Tower erected.
- 2008
  - December: Cholera outbreak.
  - Population: 674,448 in city.
- 2009 – Kelvin Mmangisa appointed mayor.
- 2010 – Parliament Building constructed.
- 2011 – July: Anti-government protest.
- 2012
  - Lilongwe University of Agriculture and Natural Resources opens.
  - Bingu wa Mutharika Conference Centre built.
  - Population: 868,800 in city (estimate).
- 2013 – Capital Hill Cashgate Scandal reported.
- 2016 – Lilongwe Trade Fair begins.
- 2017
  - Bingu National Stadium opens.
  - Desmond Bikoko becomes mayor.
  - July: Stampede occurs at Bingu Stadium.
- 2018 - Population: 989,318.
- 2020 – Population: 1,324,314 (projected estimate).

== See also ==
- Lilongwe history

== Bibliography ==
- Harri Englund (2001). "Politics of multiple identities: the making of a Home Villagers' Association in Lilongwe, Malawi". In Arne Tostensen; et al. (eds.). Associational Life in African Cities: Popular Responses to the Urban Crisis. Sweden: Nordiska Afrikainstitutet. p. 90+. ISBN 978-91-7106-465-3.
- Hastings Mumba (2005), "Land transfer from central to local government and its delivery to the people: the experience of Lilongwe city", in C. Kruse and M. Manda (ed.), Lessons in Urban Management Experiences in Malawi, 2000–2005, Malawi, ISBN 99908-920-3-2
- Malawi: Lilongwe Urban Profile, United Nations Human Settlements Programme, 2011, ISBN 978-92-1-132377-1
- Roman A. Cybriwsky (2013). "Lilongwe". Capital Cities around the World: An Encyclopedia of Geography, History, and Culture. ABC-CLIO. p. 155+. ISBN 978-1-61069-248-9.
- Maria Rusca; et al. (2017). "Bathing without water, and other stories of everyday hygiene practices and risk perception in urban low-income areas: the case of Lilongwe, Malawi". Environment and Urbanization. 29 (2): 533. Bibcode:2017EnUrb..29..533R. doi:10.1177/0956247817700291.

== Images ==
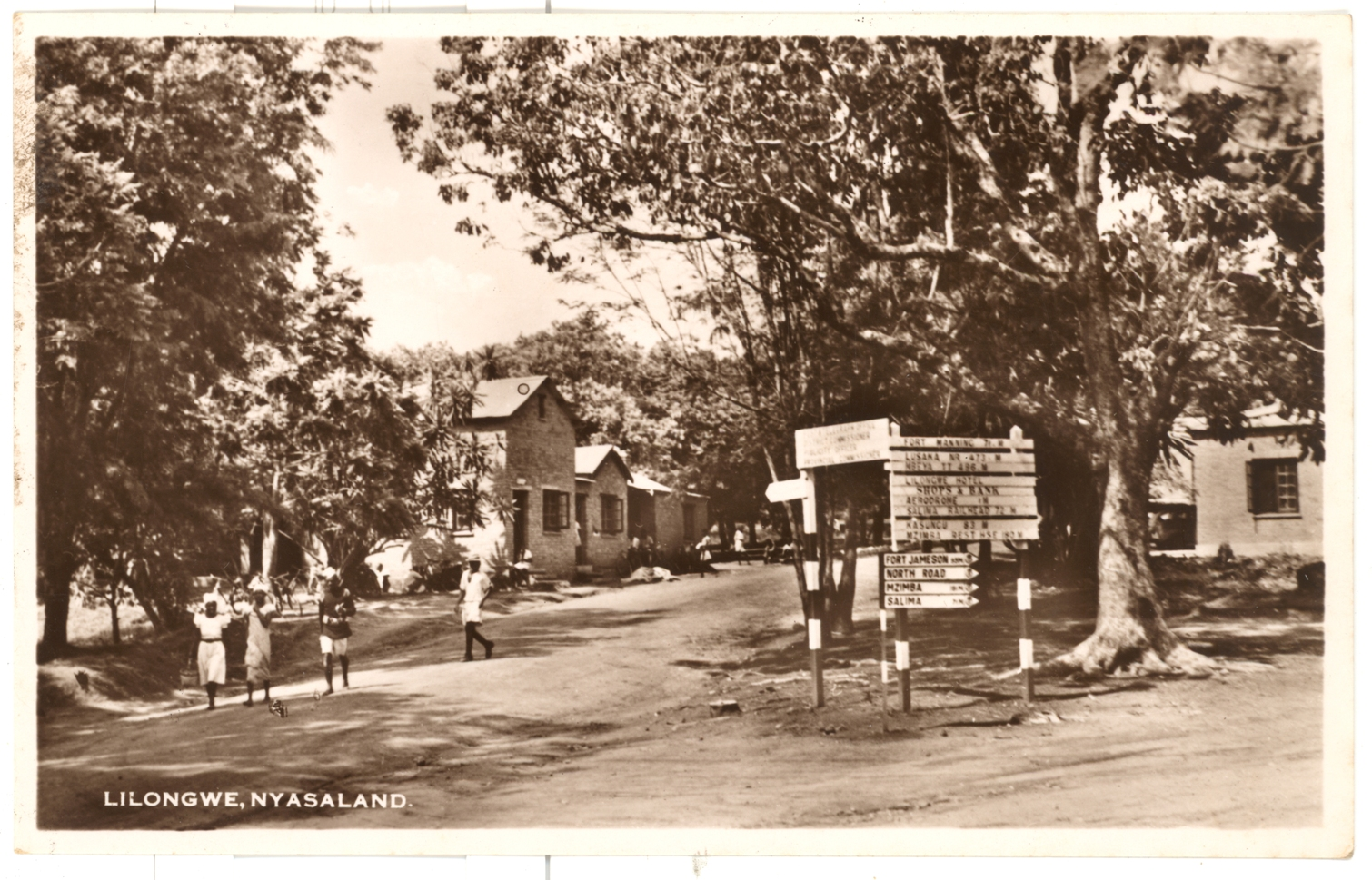
Lilongwe, early 20th c.

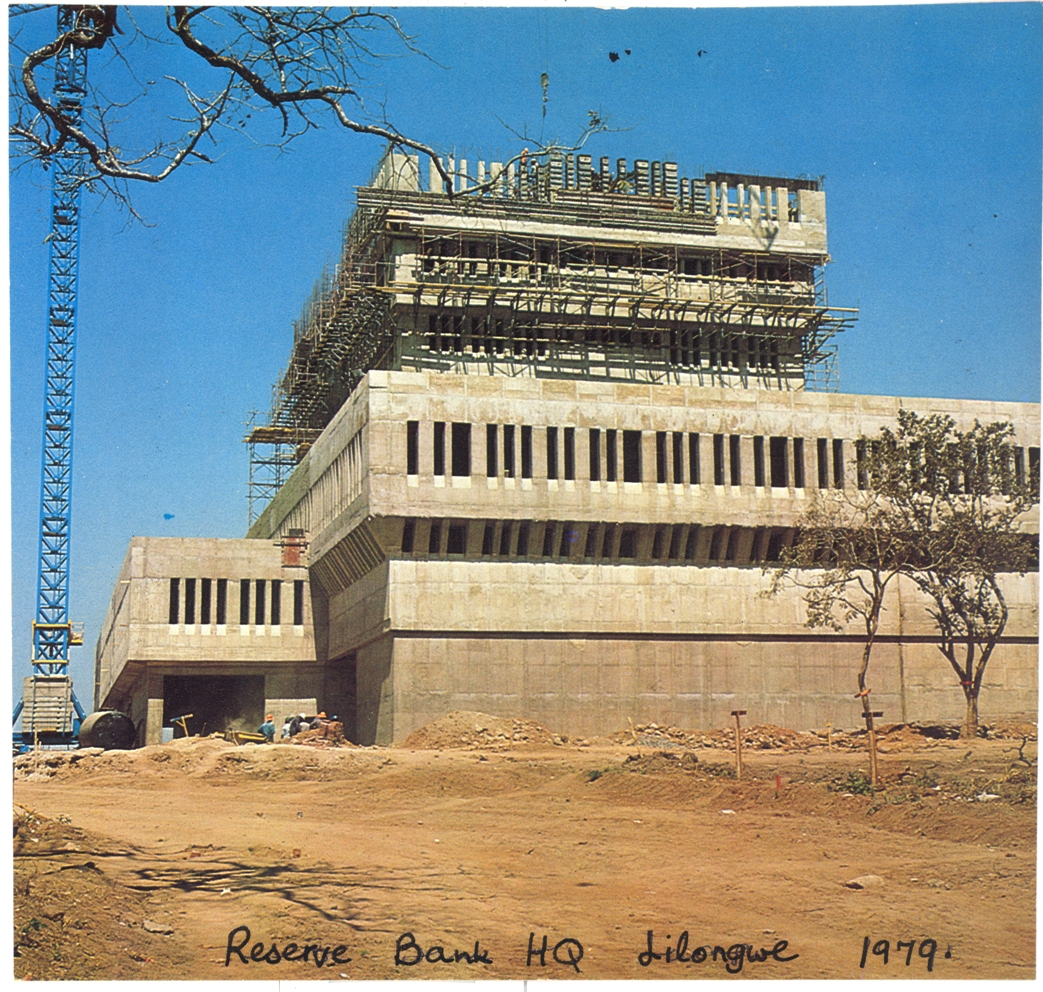
Reserve Bank of Malawi headquarters under construction, Lilongwe, 1979

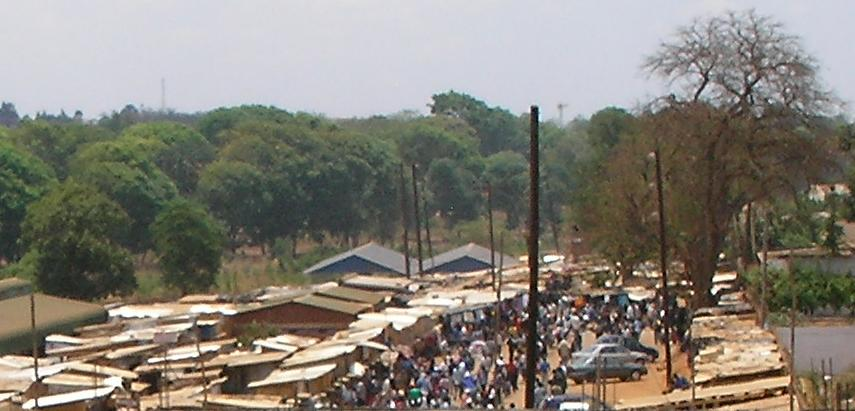
Lilongwe market, 2008

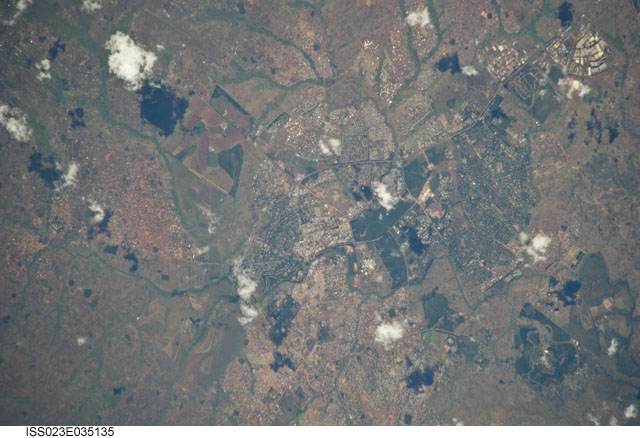
View of Lilongwe from space, 2010
