= Nyasaland in World War II =

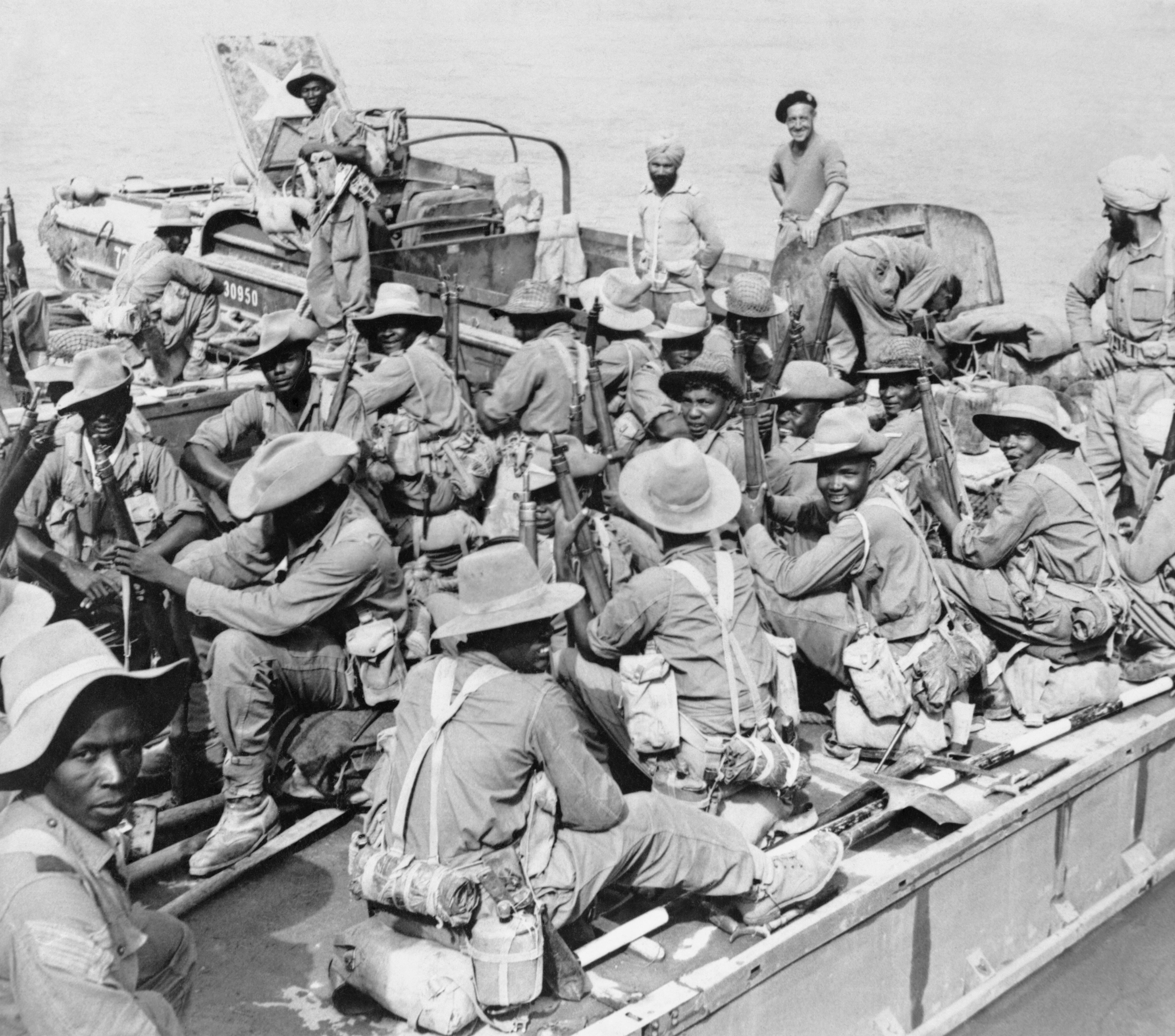
Soldiers of the King's African Rifles photographed in 1944 during the Burma Campaign

The involvement of the Nyasaland Protectorate in World War II began with the declaration of war on Nazi Germany by the British Empire in September 1939. Though no combat occurred in Nyasaland itself, it remained an economic asset for the Allies and also contributed a significant number of soldiers to fight in the British Army.

== Background ==
The Nyasaland Protectorate, a successor to the British Central Africa Protectorate, was formed in 1907. The colony, despite possessing unexploited mineral resources, had an economy based majorly around agriculture, most of which was on a subsistence-only level, with coffee, tobacco, tea and cotton as important cash crops for export. Famines were common among the indigenous Africans, and there was ample tension between the "natives" – who unlike Europeans of British origin did not hold British citizenship, instead possessing the lesser status of British protected person – and the European settlers.

Nyasaland became heavily involved in the First World War – some 19,000 Nyasaland Africans served in the King's African Rifles, and up to 200,000 others were forced to be porters for varying periods, mostly in the East African Campaign against the Germans in German East Africa, where disease caused many casualties among them. This, together with other sources of conflict, resulted in the failed Chilembwe uprising in January 1915, led by the pastor John Chilembwe.

== Outbreak of war ==
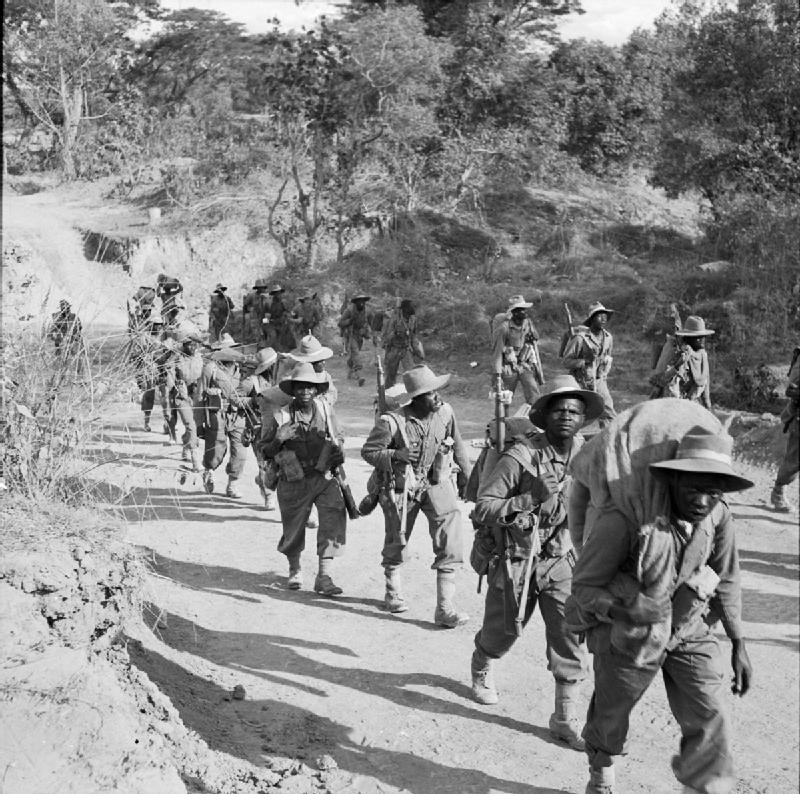
Soldiers of the King's African Rifles on the road to Kalewa, Burma, during the Chindwin River crossing

Two days after the German invasion of Poland on 1 September 1939, the United Kingdom declared war on Nazi Germany. Due to the Imperial German loss in the previous war, the country possessed no African colonies. German East Africa, the source of Nyasaland's main involvement in World War I, had been divided between the victors, the main portion becoming the Tanganyika Territory under British colonial rule. Nyasaland still came to have an involvement in the war.

Already on 4 September 1939, the Acting Governor in Zomba requested immediate aid, fearful that the German settlers may organize a pro-Nazi uprising. The European expatriate community in Nyasaland was always small, numbering only 1,948 in 1945 (as compared to over two million "native" Africans), a significant number of which were German in origin. In response 50 soldiers from the Territorial Army arrived in Nyasaland by air, the first Southern Rhodesian troops to be sent abroad during the war. They were under the command of Captain T. G. Standing. They returned to Salisbury after only a month, having found there to be no risk of a possible rebellion.

As in many other British colonies in Africa, a number of camps were constructed in Nyasaland intended to house Polish war refugees. Additionally, perceived "enemy aliens" – primarily members of the aforementioned German community, but also Italian settlers – were brought to Southern Rhodesia for internment during the war.

== Military involvement ==
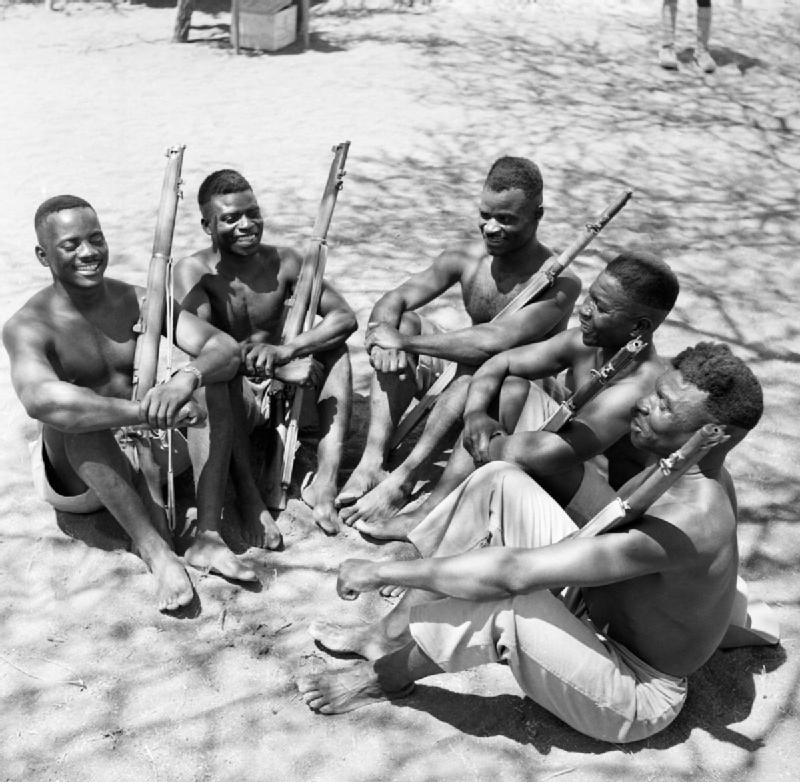
Soldiers of the King's African Rifles during the British advance into Italian Somaliland

Many Nyasas came to fight for the British during the war, primarily as – just like during World War I – soldiers of the King's African Rifles (KAR). The Nyasas were not conscripted outright – instead, the colonial authorities threatened the local aristocracy with a reduction in privileges if they failed to provide sufficient numbers of men. As a result, many recruits either deserted or were rejected on medical grounds. Nonetheless, by August 1942 a total of 16,400 Nyasas were serving in the KAR, as compared to roughly 2,000 at the war's start. Out of a total 43 KAR battalions, 12 hailed from Nyasaland. Others were recruited into the Artillery, Engineers, Service Corps and Medical Corps, placing the total number of enlisted Nyasas at around 27,000.

They would go on to fight in a number of theatres, first of all the East African Campaign, where Nyasas fought Italian troops. Initially expected to disappoint in combat, the success of the 1st Battalion KAR in defending the Kenyan town of Moyale – where a hundred soldiers from Nyasaland held out against 3,000 Italians – rapidly changed the British opinion. In 1940 the 2nd Nyasaland Battalion participated in the failed defence of British Somaliland against an Italian invasion. The following year Nyasa troops participated in routing the Italian forces from Somaliland and Ethiopia. In 1942 a battalion from Nyasaland participated in the Battle of Madagascar, capturing the island from Vichy France.

In 1944 four Nyasaland battalions (out of a total of 17 from the King's African Rifles) fought in the Burma Campaign, opposing the Empire of Japan, the State of Burma, the Azad Hind and Thailand. Over the course of several months they experienced harsh jungle warfare, fighting their way down the Chindwin River against hard Japanese resistance.

== Aftermath ==
After World War II, thousands of recently demobilized soldiers returned to Nyasaland in 1945 and 1946. These troops had lived in as many as a dozen different countries over the last few years, fighting alongside many people of different religion, ethnicity and culture, and been exposed to a wide array of new ideas and experiences. The colonial authorities were reportedly unsettled by this, viewing the demobilized soldiers as a threat, fearing them due to their advanced military training and their possible openness to radicalism – such as socialist and anti-colonial thought. Many of them did indeed participate in such activities, with many ex-soldiers participating in the conferences held by the nascent Nyasaland African Congress.

Economically, Nyasaland benefited from the end of the War. New expertise arrived in the form of the returning soldiers – around 3,000 askaris had been trained as lorry drivers in the army, and many of them joined civilian transport companies. With the wartime blockades and trade disruptions ceasing, import and export could again flow, and the tea and tobacco industry recuperated from its losses.

== See also ==
- Kenya in World War II
- Southern Rhodesia in World War II

== Bibliography ==
- Lee, C. (2005). "The Native Undefined: Colonial Categories, Anglo-African Status and the Politics of Kinship in British Central Africa, 1929–38". The Journal of African History. 46 (3). Cambridge University Press: 455–478. doi:10.1017/S0021853705000861. JSTOR 4100640. S2CID 145790221.
- Macdonald, J. (1945). Lion with Tusk Guardant (PDF). Salisbury: Rhodesian Printing and Publishing Company. OCLC 85997210.
- McCracken, J. (2012). A History of Malawi, 1859–1966. Woodbridge: Boydell & Brewer. ISBN 9781847010506.
- Page, M. (2000). The Chiwaya War: Malawians In The First World War. New York: Avalon. ISBN 9780813307350.
- Pike, J. (1968). Malawi: A Political and Economic History. London: F.A. Praeger. OCLC 1037119846.
- Rupiah, M. (1995). "The History of the Establishment of Internment Camps and Refugee Settlements in Southern Rhodesia, 1938–1952". Zambezia. 22 (2). University of Zimbabwe: 137–152. hdl:10520/AJA03790622_444. ISSN 0379-0622.
- Stapleton, T. (2013). A Military History of Africa. Santa Barbara: ABC-CLIO. ISBN 9780313395703.
- Moyse-Bartlett, The Kings’ African Rifles (KAR): A study in the military history of East and Central Africa, 1890–1945
