= Yatuta Chisiza =

Malawian politician (1926–1967)

Yatuta Chisiza (born 1926 – died October 1967, near Blantyre, Malawi) was a Malawi minister of home affairs who led a brief guerrilla incursion into the country in October 1967. He is considered one of the most important figures in pre and post colonial politics in Malawi.

He entered Mwanza district from Tanzania with nine others. In the following clash with security forces on 9 October 1967 he and two other members of insurgent forces were killed, five captured, others fleeing.

== Early years ==
Chisiza was born in the Karonga district of northern Malawi (then Nyasaland) in 1926, to Kaluli Chisiza, a Group Village Headman. He was educated at Uliwa Junior Primary School and at the mission school at Livingstonia. He subsequently worked as an Assistant Inspector of Police in Tanzania (then Tanganyika) and returned to Malawi in 1958. For a short time he, together with his brother Dunduzu Chisiza, attempted to go in business operating a butcher's shop in Blantyre market, but this venture soon failed.

== Nyasaland Independence Movement ==
After the historic Nyasaland African Congress convention in January 1959, he was appointed as bodyguard to Hastings Kamuzu Banda, who later became the first premier of Malawi. He was arrested along with hundreds of others (including his brother) in the dawn raids of Operation Sunrise on 3 March 1959, when the colonial administration declared a state of emergency in Nyasaland. In 1960 he was named as Secretary General of the MCP under Banda's presidency. He was imprisoned in Khami Prison near Bulawayo, Southern Rhodesia. He was released, some months after Banda, in September 1960.

== Political career ==
After the death of his brother, Dunduzu Chisiza, in September 1962, Yatuta was elected to the Legislative Council for Karonga district and Banda appointed him Minister of Home Affairs.

== Nyasaland cabinet crisis ==
Not long after Malawi had gained independence from Great Britain in July 1964, he was one of several cabinet ministers who, chafing under an increasingly autocratic leadership, were ousted by Banda in the Cabinet Crisis of 1964. He fled the country and, allegedly after undergoing military training in China, later conducted guerilla operations against the Banda regime from Tanzania. Here, Chisiza founded the Socialist League of Malawi (LESOMA), the most radical Malawian party in opposition to the Banda regime. Chisiza was succeeded by Attati Mpakati. Another exiled Malawian and important member of LESOMA was Mahoma M. Mwaungulu.

== Paul Theroux and the bread van affair ==
In 1964 Paul Theroux, an outspoken American Peace Corps Volunteer in Nyasaland, was declared persona non grata by Dr. Hastings Banda for supporting Yatuta, who was accused of attempting to overthrow the government. Theroux delivered a letter from an exiled opposition leader, David Rubadiri, to Chisiza in Tanzania. He also carried a coded message from Chisiza to a "Greek fellow" in Blantyre. According to an account by Theroux in Esquire Magazine, when Theroux delivered the message on October 16 to the Greek baker, who was en route to delivering his bread to Ntcheu, the baker "trembled and went pale"." : guessed the Greek baker had been caught, interrogated by the Malawi Criminal Investigation Department about bread van", and exposed Yatuta's whereabouts and Theroux's involvement. Banda told the American ambassador that he had proof Theroux was plotting to kill him, and demanded the volunteer be sent home. He found out later that in his final day, instead of finding bread waiting in a van, Chisiza found Malawi soldiers, who ambushed and killed the revolutionary gunman from Tanzania where he was plotting against Banda. Paul Theroux was thrown out of the Peace Corps for his role in Malawi and is now a renowned novelist.

== His death ==
Chisiza was killed by a single shot to the head in October 1967, apparently by Malawian security forces, although rumours have attributed a role to security forces of the Ian Smith regime in Southern Rhodesia. His body was put on display at the Queen Elizabeth Central Hospital near Blantyre as a warning to other potential insurgents.
He was survived by two sons, Vyande Yatuta Chisiza and Kwacha Chisiza with spouses Jane Munde and Theresa Mutale respectively. Yatuta's grandchildren: Millie, Bakalele, Mphikwa, Matebe, Mutale, Lusayo, Atupele, Mbakaya and Chikosa. He is the brother of Dunduzu Chisiza, and uncle to Du Chisiza Jnr.
