= Krishna Savjani =

Malawian lawyer, diplomat (born 1947)

Krishna Savjani OBE SC (born 1947) is a Malawian lawyer. He is the founder of Savjani and Company, Malawi's leading law firm according to Chambers and Partners. He is also Senior Counsel, an appointment made by the President of Malawi. He was appointed to the Order of the British Empire by Her Majesty Queen Elizabeth II in 2003.

== Early life ==
Savjani was born in Jamnagar, India. According to personal testimony, Savjani's father, Haridas Manji Savjani, came to Malawi in 1933 at the age of 16. He started his own business just before the Second World War and succeeded in importing goods during wartime when shipping was at risk. He went to India at the end of the Second World War to get married. Krishna Savjani came to Malawi as a nine-month-old baby.

He attended Sir Robert Armitage High School in Limbe where, according to personal testimony, he arranged for the school to invite eminent politicians like Kanyama Chiume and Henry Chipembere to come and debate.

== Legal career ==
Krishna Savjani was called to the Bar at Gray's Inn in July 1969. In 1978, he established the law firm Savjani & Co. He was appointed Senior Counsel, an appointment made by the President of Malawi. Senior Counsel is the equivalent of Queen's Counsel in England.

=== Advisory Committee on Appointment of Senior Counsel ===
Savjani is a member of the four-person Advisory Committee (comprising the Chief Justice, the Attorney General, the President of the Malawi Law Society and Mr. Savjani) on the appointment of Senior Counsel. Mr. Savjani became its member in July 1999 when it was established. He was involved in the drafting of its rules.

=== Honorary Legal Appointment ===
Savjani has been Honorary Legal Adviser to the British High Commissioner in Malawi since 1994, the first person to be appointed so in Malawi. He is also a British Consul.

== Malawi Stock Exchange ==
Savjani acted as Chairman of the Malawi Stock Exchange from 2000 to 2010. Initially involved in the working committee to consider the need for a stock exchange, Krishna Savjani subsequently played an active role in drawing the listing rules. He was also previously Chairman of the Listing Committee.

== Mwanza Accident Commission of Inquiry ==
Savjani was one of the members of the Presidential Commission of Inquiry, in 1994, into the so-called Mwanza Motor accident resulting in the death of three senior cabinet ministers and one Member of Parliament in 1982: Dick Matenje, Twaibu Sangala, Aaron Gadama, and David Chiwanga. The commission was appointed soon after the fall of Kamuzu Banda when Malawi changed from a one party state to a multiparty state.

== Other activities ==
Savjani has acted as spokesman for the Asian community in Malawi from 1971.

== Honours ==
- He was awarded Order of the British Empire by Queen Elizabeth II in 2003.

== See also ==
- Henry Masauko Chipembere
- Kanyama Chiume
- Malawi Stock Exchange

== Literature ==
- B. Pachai, Malawi, past and present. (Blantyre: CLAIM, 1972).
- B. Pachai, Malawi: the history of the nation. (London: Longman, 1973).
- B. Pachai, (Ed) The early history of Malawi, (London: Longman, 1973).
- D. D. Phiri, History of Malawi. (Blantyre: CLAIM, 2004)
- D. D. Phiri, History of Malawi. Vol. 2 (Blantyre: College Publishing Company, 2010)
- O. Kalinga and C. Crosby, Historical Dictionary of Malawi, 3rd ed. (Maryland: Scarecrow Press, 2001)
