= Rebecca Reynolds (academic) =

British physician and academic

Rebecca Mary Reynolds FRSE FRCOG FMedSci FRCP (Edin) FRCP

Academic background
- Education: University of Edinburgh (PhD); University of Oxford (BMBCh, MA)

Academic work
- Institutions: University of Edinburgh; University of Southampton

Rebecca Mary Reynolds is a British physician and academic. She is currently the personal chair of metabolic medicine at the University of Edinburgh, and honorary consultant physician in diabetes and endocrinology at NHS Lothian. She was awarded a Fellowship of the Royal Society of Edinburgh in 2026.

== Education ==
In 1985, Reynolds attended Pembroke College, Oxford, and studied medicine. She obtained a Master of Arts in 1989, and a Bachelor of Medicine, Bachelor of Surgery in 1992.

In 2002, Reynolds was awarded a Doctor of Philosophy by the University of Edinburgh.

== Career ==
Upon graduation, Reynolds worked in the University of Southampton, and then became a researcher in the Medical Research Council Lifecourse Epidemiology Unit. In 1995, she qualified as a member of the Royal College of Physicians. In 1999, Reynolds was awarded a clinical research fellowship by the Wellcome Trust, and she joined the University of Edinburgh.

In 2004, Reynolds became a senior lecturer at the University, and honorary consultant physician in diabetes and endocrinology at NHS Lothian. In 2007, she was elected as a fellow of the Royal College of Physicians and Royal College of Physicians of Edinburgh. In 2008, together with her obstetric colleagues, Reynolds set up the Lothian Metabolic Antenatal Clinic.

In 2010, Reynolds was promoted to a reader. In August 2013, she was appointed the personal chair of metabolic medicine.

In 2024, Reynolds was elected a Fellow of the Academy of Medical Sciences. In 2025, she was awarded a fellowship ad eundem by the Royal College of Obstetricians and Gynaecologists. In April 2026, Reynolds was elected a Fellow of the Royal Society of Edinburgh, in the discipline of clinical sciences.

== Research ==
Reynolds' research is in the early life origins of health, and prevention of non-communicable diseases. In recognition of her research, she was awarded the Nick Hales Award in 2011 by the International Society for Developmental Origins of Health and Disease, and the Curt Richter Award in 2012 by the International Society of Psychoneuronendocrinology. In September 2025, Reynolds was awarded the International Excellence in Endocrinology Award by the Endocrine Society.

During an international conference on advanced clinical medicine in 2016, Reynolds said that India has "the highest number of diabetic patients in the world", and attributed it to poor diet due to poverty. She added that diabetes could increase the risks of malaria, tuberculosis, and HIV/AIDS.

In June 2025, in response to the usage of weight loss drugs during pregnancy, Reynolds said that "hardly any available data from human studies" showed that the drugs were safe or not. She added that animal studies showed potential harm, such as skeletal abnormalities and low birth weight, and highlighted the need to raise awareness on these potential issues to clinicians and women.

Reynolds has authored or co-authored more than 300 publications. Reynolds currently runs the Rebecca Reynolds' Research Group, under the Centre for Cardiovascular Science.

== Selected publications ==
- Drake, Amanda J.; Reynolds, Rebecca M. (1 September 2010). "Impact of maternal obesity on offspring obesity and cardiometabolic disease risk". Reproduction. 140 (3): 387–398. doi:10.1530/REP-10-0077. eISSN 1741-7899. ISSN 1470-1626. LCCN 2001245725. OCLC 45662873. PMID 20562299. CODEN RCUKBS.
- Reynolds, Rebecca M.; Allan, Keith M.; Raja, Edwin A.; Bhattacharya, Sohinee; McNeill, Geraldine; Hannaford, Philip C.; Sarwar, Nadeem; Lee, Amanda J.; Bhattacharya, Siladitya; Norman, Jane E. (13 August 2013). "Maternal obesity during pregnancy and premature mortality from cardiovascular event in adult offspring: follow-up of 1 323 275 person years". BMJ. 347 (aug13 1): f4539–f4539. doi:10.1136/bmj.f4539. eISSN 1756-1833. ISSN 0959-8138. JSTOR 09598138. LCCN 97640199. OCLC 32595642. PMC 3805484. PMID 23943697. CODEN DXRA5.
- Godfrey, Keith M.; Reynolds, Rebecca M.; Prescott, Susan L.; Nyirenda, Moffat; Jaddoe, Vincent W. V.; Eriksson, Johan G.; Broekman, Birit F. P. (12 October 2016). "Influence of maternal obesity on the long-term health of offspring". The Lancet Diabetes & Endocrinology. 5 (1): 53–64. doi:10.1016/S2213-8587(16)30107-3. eISSN 2213-8595. ISSN 2213-8587. PMC 5245733. PMID 27743978.
- Johns, Emma C.; Denison, Fiona C.; Norman, Jane E.; Reynolds, Rebecca M. (5 October 2018). "Gestational Diabetes Mellitus: Mechanisms, Treatment, and Complications". Trends in Endocrinology and Metabolism. 29 (11): 743–754. doi:10.1016/j.tem.2018.09.004. eISSN 1879-3061. hdl:20.500.11820/3660e66a-d9d7-41c4-8efb-77c1bd5f6e41. ISSN 1043-2760. PMID 30297319.
- Wastnedge, Elizabeth A. N.; Reynolds, Rebecca M.; van Boeckel, Sara R.; Stock, Sarah J.; Denison, Fiona C.; Maybin, Jacqueline A.; Critchley, Hilary O. D. (1 January 2021). "Pregnancy and COVID-19". Physiological Reviews. 101 (1): 303–318. doi:10.1152/physrev.00024.2020. eISSN 1522-1210. ISSN 0031-9333. PMC 7686875. PMID 32969772.
