= Nancy Kachingwe =

Nancy Kachingwe is a Zimbabwean activist, feminist, and researcher. She won a court case when she complained about prison conditions.

== History ==
Zimbabwe's ministry's attacks on women, mainly from Operation Clean-Up, also known as Operation Restore Order or Operation Murambatsvina (Move the Rubbish), is said to be a reason for the rise of feminism in the 1980s and 1990s. Regulations on women increased, but many organizations gave women their voices back. Those organizations include the Women's Action Group (WAG), and a workshop that was organized around “Zimbabwean Women Speak Out,” to which over 400 women attended.

== Early life ==
Kachingwe attended the elite Kamuzu Academy, a private boarding school in Kasungu, Malawi, from 1982 to 1985, and later attended the University of Zimbabwe, where she got her BA in Modern Languages, French and Portuguese.

By the 1990s, women had made their mark in the political sphere. Zimbabwean women ran for office, they wrote legislation and constitutional law, and they used their reclaimed influence to alter institutional practices. Kachingwe helped to reclaim power by forming nongovernmental organizations (NGOs) to help the cause, as well as by joining already existing ones. By 1995, over 25 women's organizations officially existed that addressed women's lives in both rural and urban areas.

== Achievements ==
Nancy Kachingwe advocates for women through global aid, bringing light to sexual abuse scandals and aid organizations involved in them. She explains that such scandals are part of broader, global issues, such as sexism, racism, and unequal power. She stresses that women, especially those from poor countries, should have a greater voice in decision-making and that productive change can be achieved by both organizations and individuals taking accountability.

Kachingwe was involved in court cases addressing personal injustices. One case was Kachingwe and Others v. Minister of Home Affairs (2005). Before this court case, Kachingwe was arrested and detained in prison, where she endured conditions that were found to be inhuman, according to the ruling of the court. According to the case, Kachingwe mentioned that as she entered the cell, there was a foul stench, and it was extremely cold, where they only supplied her with a dirty, small, torn blanket. She also highlighted in her statement that there was no water, soap, or running water in her cell. Furthermore, the conditions Kachingwe endured in this prison fostered her passion for her right of privacy, since she stated she had to use the restroom in front of other inmates, as well as wash herself and be in the presence of other inmates doing the same thing.

In the end, the court ruled that the mistreatment suffered by Kachingwe violated Section 15(1) of the Zimbabwe Constitution, stating that "No person shall be subjected to torture or to inhuman or degrading punishment or other such treatment.” In making its ruling, the court decided that the conditions in which Kachingwe and other inmates endured did not follow basic standards of humanity. Additionally, throughout this case, Nancy Kachingwe highlighted the importance of considering the needs of specific women in detention settings and noted the requirements of women's sanitary and hygiene needs.

== Impact today ==
Kachingwe was a board member of South Feminist Futures, where she focuses on a number of issues, particularly on influencing policy and strengthening civil society and movement-building.
