= George Prentice =

Vicar for the Free Church of Scotland

- Born: 15 January 1871; Lanarkshire, Scotland
- Died: 29 February 1948 (aged 77); Northern Rhodesia
- Occupations: Doctor, missionary, farmer

George Prentice (1871–1948) was a Scottish missionary and served as a vicar for the Free Church of Scotland. He was one of the first to conduct missionary activities in southeastern Africa (modern-day Malawi) and is known for baptizing Malawi's first president, Hastings Banda when Banda was his student from 1908 to 1914.

== Biography ==
Prentice was born in 1871 at Mid-Greenwell, near Carnwath in Lanarkshire to James and Christine Prentice (née Elder). His father worked as a farmer and owned 58 acres of land while his mother died in 1876. He spent his childhood living with his five brothers and sisters at Craigen House, Carnwath.

He moved to Edinburgh and was a medical student at the University of Edinburgh. Three years later, he was qualified as a doctor at the university and obtained a licentiate from both Royal College of Physicians of Edinburgh and Royal College of Physicians and Surgeons of Glasgow in 1894.

He was ordained as a minister in 1894 by the Old Free Church of Scotland and moved to Africa to conduct missionary activities.

Prentice worked with Robert Scott, a Scottish when he first settled in Africa. In 1897, during his Africa's journey, he toured the northern parts of Luangwa valley, making contact with Senga people who lived in large stockaded villages surrounded by thorn trees and visited Kamanga and seeing evidence of the Swahili dwellings among the Bisa. According to an 1898 British Medical Registration record, he stayed at Loudon, Nyasaland.

Record also indicated that Prentice was in Kasungu in 1897 but had travelled to Bandawe. He opened seven schools in Kasungu after spending time there since 1897. He also established the Chilanga missionary station and was appointed head of the mission in October 1900 during his time in Kasungu.

During World War I, he joined as a Captain with the Column 3/1 King's African Rifles and was later transferred to Column 4/1 as a medical officer. On 19 May 1917, he was appointed as temporary Captain with the Nyasaland Field Force.

On 12 February 1924, Prentice arrived in London from Beira, Mozambique on board the Royal Mail Ship of HMHS Goorkha. Later on 12 August 1927, he departed from London for Biera on a Royal Mail Ship Electrician. He returned to Scotland in 1924 and spent time staying in Kennetpans, Clackmannan until somewhere around 1931.

During the 1930s and 1940s, he stayed at Fort Jameson, During his time at Fort Jameson, George farmed tobacco on the farm named Nchere Hill in Northern Rhodesia (modern-day Zambia) and died there in 1948. He was buried at Aylmer May Cemetery, Rhodes Park, Lusaka.

== Family ==
Prentice married Agnes Tudhope Scott on 10 May 1900 at the St Michael and All Angels Cathedral in Blantyre, Nyasaland. The couple had four children:

- Margaret Christina Prentice - born in 1902, at Kasungu, Nyasaland and 1903 British General Medical Registration for lists him as being at Kasungu, Ngara, British Central Africa
- Isabel Agnes Scott Prentice - born on 26 Feb 1906 at The Orchard, Bridge of Allan, Stirlingshire, Scotland. George was present at the birth and presumably on leave from the Kasungu Mission in Nyasaland. Her British General Medical Council registration for 1907 gives his address as being Kasungu, Ngara, British Central Africa (source: Scotlands People and British Medical Registers). She died later on 17 January 1916 at the Royal Scottish Nursing Home in Edinburgh from acute peritonitis.
- James Scott Prentice - born in 1908 at Kasungu, Nyasaland
- Robert Scott Prentice - born on 30 July 1910 at Bridge of Allan, Stirlingshire, Scotland. His birth was registered and witnessed by a nurse which probably means that George was not in Scotland but had remained in Nyasaland.

== Sources ==
- Politics and Christianity in Malawi, 1875-1940: The Impact of the Livingstonia Mission in the Northern Province by John McCracken; published by African Books Collective (2008) ISBN 9789990887501
