= Gadama =

Gadama is a surname. Notable people with the surname include:

- Aaron Gadama (died 1983), Malawian politician
- Hans-Georg Gadamer (1900–2002), German philosopher
- Roseby Gadama, Malawian politician
