= Jorge Jardim =

Portuguese agronomist and entrepreneur (1919–1982)

Jardim with his daughter, 1965

Jorge Pereira Jardim (13 November 1919 in Lisbon – 1 December 1982) was a Portuguese agronomist and wealthy industrialist in Mozambique. He started his political career as undersecretary of state for commerce and industry in the government of António de Oliveira Salazar. A Fascist, he resigned from the cabinet in 1952 in opposition to the liberalisation of the commercial sector.

In 1952, Jardim moved to Mozambique. He was a personal friend of Ian Smith, Prime Minister of Rhodesia, and of President Hastings Kamuzu Banda of Malawi, who appointed Jardim as Malawi's Honorary Consul in Mozambique. During Marcelo Caetano's government, he tried to solve the problem of Mozambique through diplomatic negotiations, presenting his "Plan of Lusaka", which was replaced after the Carnation Revolution by the Lusaka Accord, that led to the independence of Mozambique.

Jardim ran the SONAREP oil refinery in Maputo until it was nationalised by the Mozambique government.

== Publications ==
- Jorge Jardim: Sanctions double-cross. Oil to Rhodesia. Bulawayo, Books of Rhodesia, 1979.
- Jorge Jardim: Rodésia, o escândalo das sanções. Lisboa, Intervenção, 1978.
- Jorge Jardim: Moçambique : terra queimada. Lisboa, Intervenção, 1976.
