= Yolanda Kaunda =

Malawi's first female aircraft captain

Yolanda Kaunda Flight Captain
- Born: 1987 (age 38–39); Lilongwe
- Citizenship: Malawi
- Occupation: Airline Pilot

Yolanda Kaunda (née Ndala) (born 1987) is Malawi's first female aircraft captain and its second female pilot.

== Biography ==
Kaunda was born in Lilongwe in 1987 and from the age of six she wanted to become a pilot. She completed her secondary education at Kamuzu Academy in Kasungu in 2005, then went to South Africa's Progress Flight Academy.

In 2016, Kaunda graduated as Malawi's first female aircraft captain. Her first flight as Captain took place on 11 March 2016 at Kamuzu International Airport, in Lilongwe. The first Malawian female pilot was Fellie Mkandawire, who stopped flying before reaching the rank of captain. Kaunda graduated as the second female pilot in Malawian history. She was the only woman in her aviation class of 80 people. She was granted her pilot's license in 2009.

For International Women's Day in March 2017, Kaunda captained the first all-women aircraft flight for Malawian Airlines. They flew from Blantyre to Dar es Salaam.

== Legacy ==
A portrait of Kaunda is featured in a mural on the wall of Khwalala Community Secondary School in Mulanje. She has been praised by the First Lady of Malawi, Dr. Gertrude Mutharika, for closing the gender gap for women.
