= Kamuzu Mausoleum =

Mausoleum in Malawi

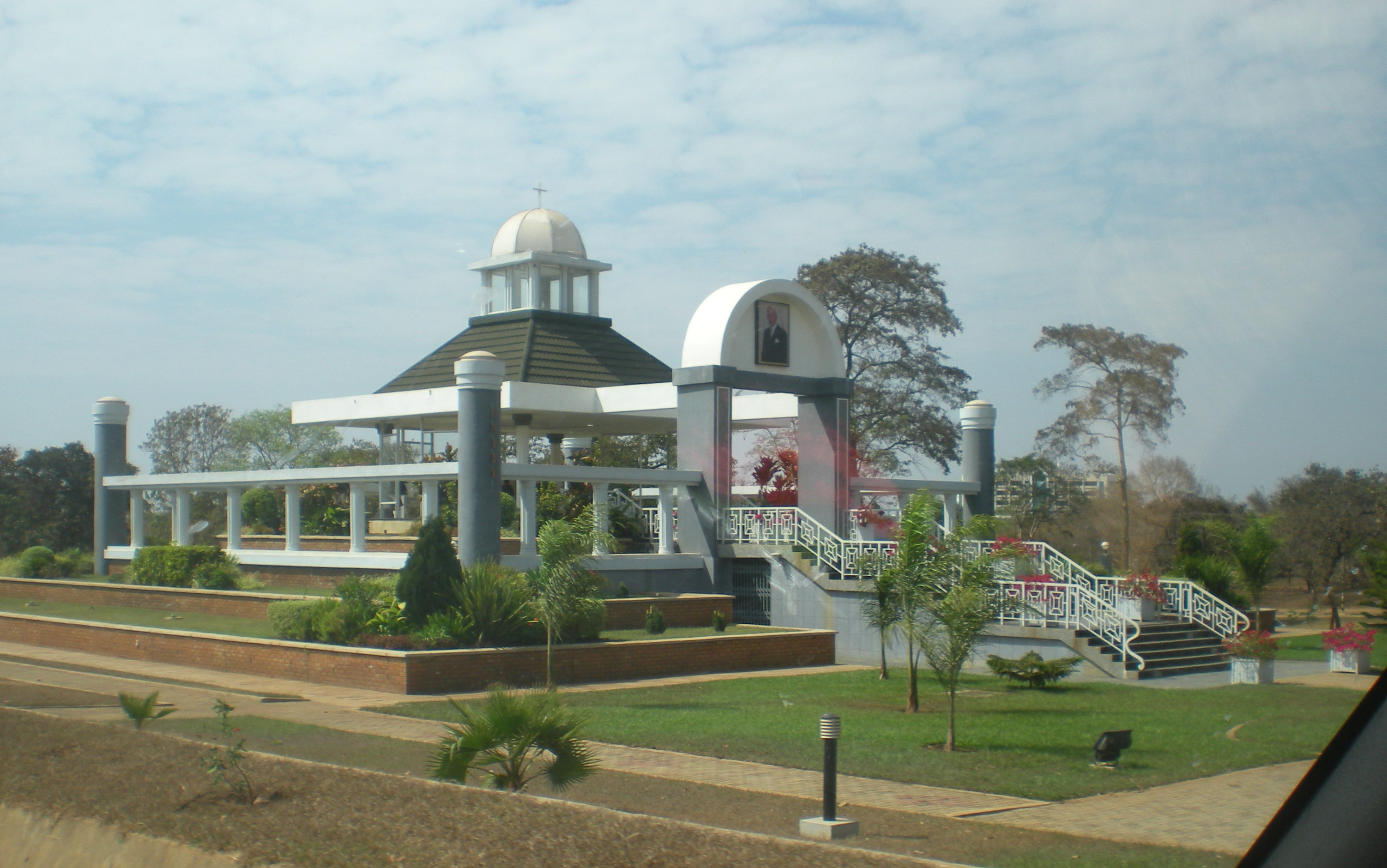
- Kamuzu Mausoleum
- Interactive map of Kamuzu Mausoleum

Details
- Established: 2005- 2006
- Location: Lilongwe, Malawi
- Country: Malawi
- Coordinates: 13°57′16″S 33°47′21″E
- Size: 9 acres (3.6 ha)

Kamuzu Mausoleum is a resting place of the first president of Malawi, Dr. Hastings Kamuzu Banda situated within Kamuzu Memorial Park. The monument holds historical significance and is dedicated to the late President Kamuzu Banda, who led Malawi to independence. Banda was born on 14 May 1898 and ruled from 1961 to 1994. He died on 25 November 1997 at the age of 99.

== Location ==
The mausoleum is located on the Presidential way next to the parliament building and new Chinese-funded National Parliament Complex. The mausoleum was designated as part of Kamuzu Memorial Park, which in its initial plans was to include among other things such as a library stocked with books and literature about Kamuzu Banda.

== History ==
The first plan approach was informed to the national members of the Monuments Advisory Council, a body of heritage experts affiliated with the Department of Museums and Monuments that are responsible for designating memorial sites, and dates as public holidays in 2004. After the council was informed, it recommended sites and dates to the minister responsible who, through parliament, endorses them as gazetted. The second part was related to government politics where the president, Dr. Bingu Wa Mutharika, using his constitutional powers declared a site to be a monument place. The construction of the mausoleum started in 2005 and completed on 14 May 2006. The mausoleum is made of marble and granite, and it has four pillars bearing the initials of Banda's principles, 'Unity', 'Loyalty', 'Discipline' and 'Obedience'. The entrance of the mausoleum has a portrait of Banda.

== Construction ==
The mausoleum was constructed by Bingu Wa Mutharika. According to The Nation Newspaper in 2004 (The Nation, 2004, page 2), the minister responsible for sports and culture, Henry Chimunthu Banda, said the construction of the mausoleum was supposed to be done in parts. The first part was the tour by stakeholders led by the Department of Museums and Monuments to countries, such as Ghana and Kenya to see how mausoleums were built. The second part was the designing which involved architectural landscaping. The third part was the construction of the mausoleum that included a museum, office block, library, VIP lounge, recreation centre and statue of the late Kamuzu Banda. The whole complex system would be called Kamuzu Memorial Park. The minister said the mausoleum project was intended to enlight the history of Malawi from the time the country was under the British colonial rule to the death of the former head of state.

== Events and public view ==
On 6 October 2004, speaking in Kasungu district, at a function to celebrate the elevation of 15 Chewa chiefs, the then president Bingu Wa Mutharika attacked his predecessor Bakili Muluzi for failing to recognize the achievements that the first president of Malawi, Kamuzu Banda had made. Mutharika told the chiefs that [[.."it was sad that seven years after Kamuzu Banda's death government has not been able to build a..]] mausoleum." Mutharika repeated his pledge to have the mausoleum built as a matter of urgency when he announced that he will "source funding for the monument if there is no money".
