= Kamuzu Academy =

Private boarding school in Malawi

Coordinates: 13°01′50″S 33°41′11″E

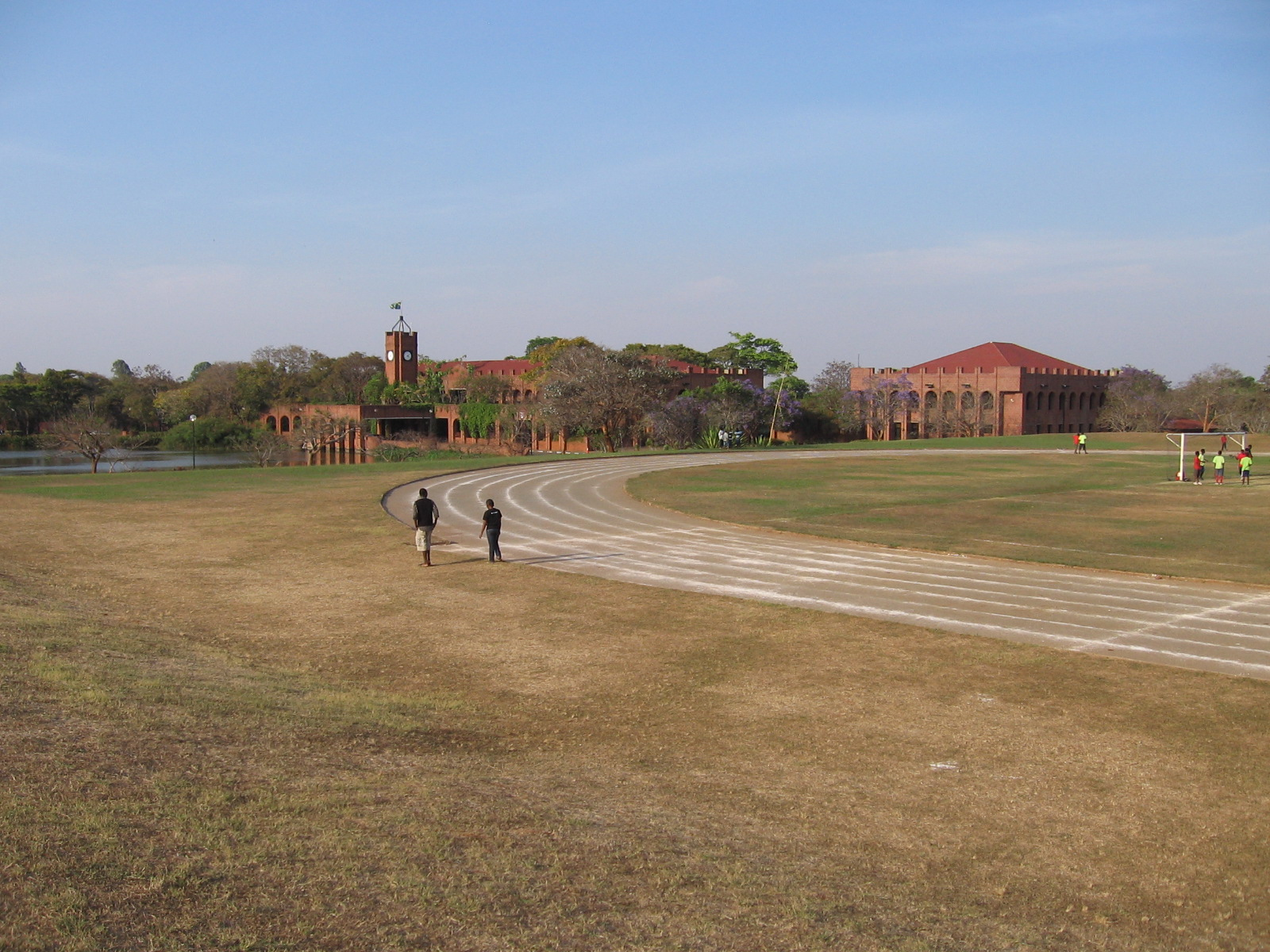

Information
- School type: Private boarding school
- Established: 1981; 45 years ago
- Founder: Hastings Banda
- Gender: Mixed
- Website: www.kamuzuacademy.com

Kamuzu Academy is a private boarding school in Kasungu, Malawi that was founded by, and named after, the late Hastings Kamuzu Banda, the former President of Malawi. It is described by its proponents as "The Eton of Africa".

== History ==
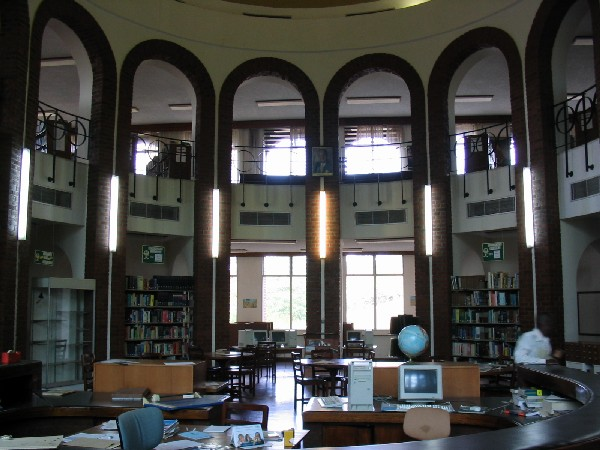
Interior of library

The school was officially founded on 21 November 1981, although students had already been attending classes for a month at that point.

In 1987, it was the subject of a BBC documentary entitled "The Eton of Africa" made by John Rae.

The original intake selected two boys and one girl from each district in Malawi on the basis of academic merit, with no fees charged. The school changed to a fee-paying basis after President Kamuzu Banda was ousted from power in the election of 1994.

An idiosyncratic feature of the school is that Latin and Greek were made compulsory subjects for all students from the beginning and are still taught today as core subjects. Kamuzu Banda is recorded as saying: "This place is for classical education, Greek, Latin, particularly Latin. I want that to be clearly understood by everybody. If you don't like Latin, don't come here."

The 40th-anniversary Founder's Day service in November 2021 was attended by President Lazarus Chakwera.

== Notable alumni ==
- Catherine Gotani Hara, politician
- Nancy Kachingwe, feminist activist
- Samson Kambalu, artist and sculptor
- Chanju Samantha Mwale, lawyer
- Yolanda Kaunda, airline pilot
- Fiona Mwale, High Court judge.
- Chifundo Kachale, High Court judge, former chairperson of the Malawi Electoral Commission
- Moffat Nyirenda, professor of medicine
- Gomani V, Inkosi ya Makhosi of the Maseko Ngoni

== See also ==
- List of boarding schools
- Category:Alumni of Kamuzu Academy
