= Prime Minister of Malawi =

Head of government of Malawi, 1964–1966

- Coat of arms of Malawi
- Formation: 6 July 1964
- First holder: Hastings Banda
- Final holder: Hastings Banda
- Abolished: 6 July 1966

The prime minister of Malawi was the head of government of Malawi from 1964 to 1966.

== List of officeholders ==
Political parties

Malawi Congress Party (MCP)

| No. | Picture | Name (Birth–Death) | Election | Term of office | | | Political Party |
| No. | Picture | Name (Birth–Death) | Election | Took office | Left office | Time in office | Political Party |
Prime Minister of Malawi (1964–1966)
| 1 | | Hastings Banda (1898–1997) | 1964 | 6 July 1964 | 6 July 1966 | 2 years | MCP |
Post abolished (6 July 1966 – present)

== See also ==
- List of heads of state of Malawi
- Lists of incumbents
