= Order of the Lion (Malawi) =

Awarded by Malawi
- Type: Order of Merit
- Ribbon: Red with gold stripes
- Awarded for: Distinguished and outstanding service to the people of Malawi
- Status: Obsolete
- Grades: Grand Commander; Grand Officer; Commander; Officer; Member; Medal
- Ribbon bar of the order

The Order of the Lion was, at one point, the highest state order, and the second highest honour bestowed by the government of Malawi.

== History ==
The order was established by President Hastings Kamuzu Banda in 1967. It was the second highest honour to be bestowed by the government of the Republic of Malawi under Hastings Banda's presidential dictatorship (1966-94). The order consisted of five classes plus a medal, to be awarded "For distinguished and outstanding services to the people of Malawi".

Banda announced the creation of the order, as well as a number of other new awards, in July 1966, as Malawi was declared a republic. The announcement was given at Zomba, the capital of Malawi at the time.

Malawian civilians, military personnel, and foreigners were all eligible to receive the Order of the Lion. However, in 2008, after three years of deliberation, the Malawian government decided to deactivate the order. Appointees, however, were still permitted to wear the insignia corresponding to their grade.

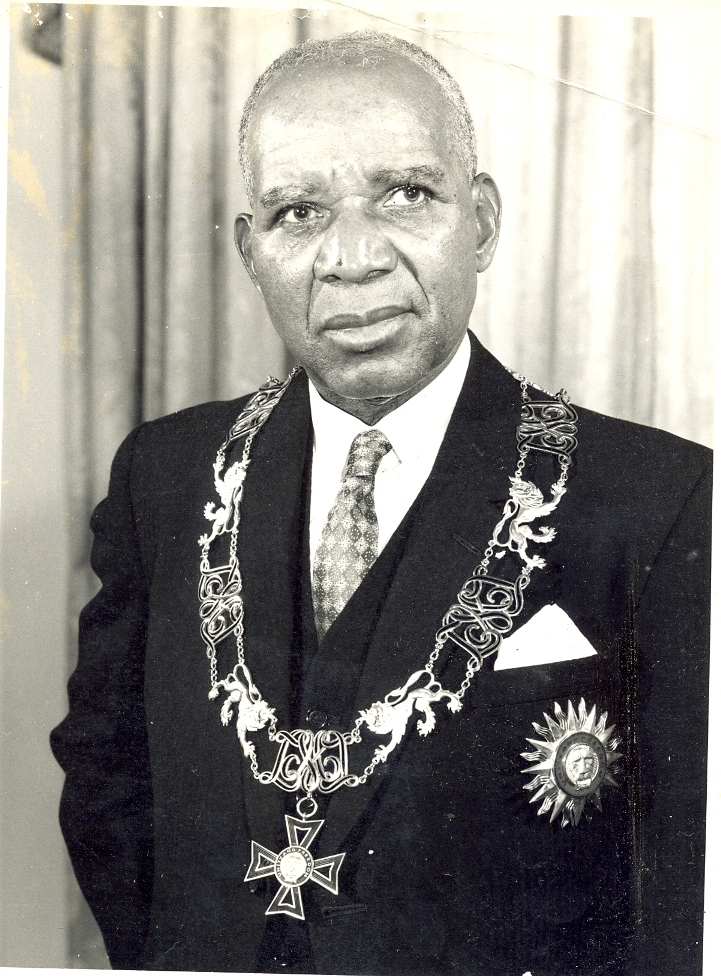
Hastings Banda wearing the Order of the Lion

== Description ==
The ribbon of the order is red, with two golden stripes running along each side. The Medal of the Order of the Lion is a cross featuring a central medallion with a lion’s face, surrounded by a red banner inscribed with the Malawian motto, “Unity and Freedom.” Higher-grade medals feature the same medallion superimposed onto a green enameled cross. Recipients of the Grand Commander and Grand Officer grades also receive a badge, again featuring the lion medallion placed on stars. The Grand Commander’s badge has twelve rays extending between the points of a twelve-pointed star, while the Grand Officer’s badge displays a ten-pointed star with alternating long and short points, itself superimposed on an inverted pentagon.

== Notable recipients ==
- Akihito
- Cecilia Kadzamira
- Charles III
- Chiang Kai-shek
- Elizabeth II
- Franz Josef Strauss
- Haile Selassie
- Leonard Massey
- Nelson Mandela
