= Chanju Samantha Mwale =

Malawian lawyer and army officer

- Military career
- Allegiance: Malawi
- Branch: Malawian Defence Force
- Service years: 2004–2017
- Rank: Lieutenant-colonel

Chanju Samantha Mwale is a Malawian lawyer and army officer. She was the first female lawyer in the Malawian Defence Force and in 2016 became the first female officer of the Malawian Army to be promoted to the rank of lieutenant-colonel. She was transferred to a research role in 2016, a move she alleged was illegal and took to the Malawi High Court. The court did not hear the case and Mwale chose to retire from the army.

== Career ==
Chanju Samantha Mwale attended the Kamuzu Academy before graduating with a bachelor of laws degree from Chancellor College (University of Malawi). She worked as a senior resident magistrate before joining the Malawian Defence Force as an assistant legal officer in 2004, the first female lawyer to join the defence force.

Mwale was deployed as a military observer to the Democratic Republic of Congo between 2010 and 2011. She participated in Southern African Development Community military exercises and, as a major, represented Malawi at the March 2012 regional United Nations Institute for Disarmament Research seminar. Mwale was awarded a United Nations fellowship in international law in 2013. She was promoted to lieutenant-colonel in May 2016, the first woman to reach that rank in the army.

Mwale was appointed deputy director of legal services in August 2016. She was transferred to become a staff officer in the directorate of research and development at the Malawi Armed Forces College on 25 May 2017. Mwale contested the change of role as unsuited to her abilities and an illegal action. Choosing not to take the matter to Malawi's Defence Council, as her superior officer sat on the council, she opened proceedings in the Malawi High Court. The case was discharged in September 2017, with the judge ruling it should have first been brought before the Defence Council. Mwale, a single mother, chose to retire from the army during the course of the proceedings.

== See also ==
- List of first women lawyers by nationality
