= 1992–1993 Malawian protests =

1992-1993 Malawian protests
- Date: March 8, 1992 – June 29, 1993
- Location: Malawi
- Caused by: Governmental corruption and hardships
- Goals: Resignation of government of Hastings Kamuzu Banda; Fresh general elections
- Methods: Demonstrations, Rallies, Marches, Strikes
- Result: Protests suppressed by force; End of government and overthrow of government; New constitution signed

Deaths and injuries
- Deaths: 38

The 1992–1993 Malawian protests was mass demonstrations and violent protests in Malawi during which 38 are thought to have lost their lives. Student-led anti-government demonstrations were held in March, leaving 1 dead. Their main demand was to legalise political parties, end single-party rule, reinstate multiparty politics and get political prisoners released, particularly Chakufwa Chihana. President Hastings Kamuzu Banda ordered troops to disperse protesters. Riots, Rallies and Marches was organised in all areas to protest the government and centre their main demands.

In Zomba, police fired on protesters and students who threw stones and chanted slogans against the federal government. A series of pro-democracy campaigns spread nationwide as the military failed to contain the movement and widespread demonstrations organised by pro-democracy campaigners, who staged largely-bloodless disturbances and peaceful protest rallies. However, the response from the national police forces was violent and preventing physical actions of marches. 3000 workers went on strike, most of whom textile workers protesting the arrest of Chakufwa Chihana and demanded the release of all political prisoners. Opposition activists staged rallies in the nation and exiled activists staged protests as well.

== See also ==
- 2011 Malawian protests
- 2019 Malawian protests
