= Samson Kambalu =

Malawian artist and academic

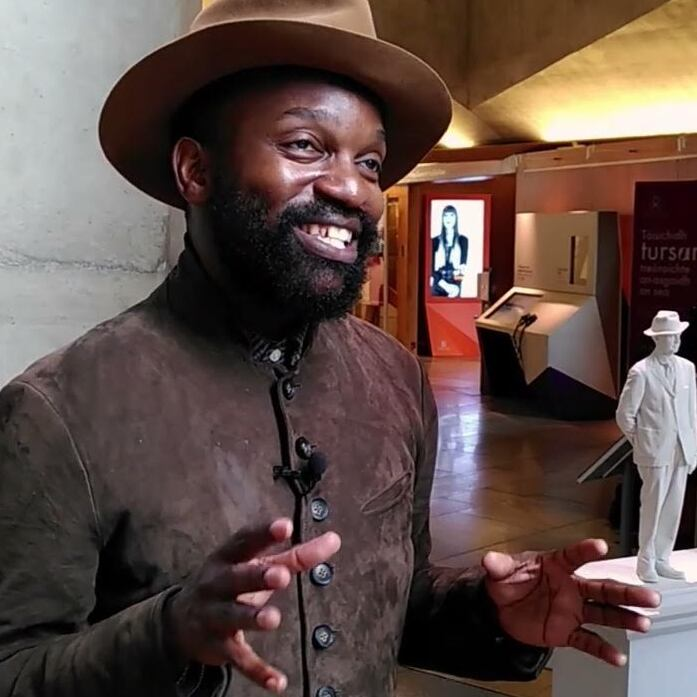
- in 2022 (by the Scotland Malawi Partnership)
- Born: 1975 (age 50–51)
- Education: Kamuzu Academy, Chancellor College, Nottingham Trent University, Chelsea College of Art and Design
- Occupation: artist
- Known for: designing the fourth plinth in Trafalgar Square
- Spouse: Susan Kambalu

Samson Kambalu (born 1975) is a Malawi-born artist, academic and author who trained as a fine artist and ethnomusicologist at the University of Malawi's Chancellor College.

== Life and work ==
Kambalu was born in Malawi, where he attended Kamuzu Academy, the "Eton of Africa". He graduated from the University of Malawi's Chancellor College, Zomba in 1999. Kambalu completed his MA in Fine Art at Nottingham Trent University in 2003 and wrote his PhD at Chelsea College of Art and Design, looking at how the problematic of the gift and the general economy animates various aspects of his art practice.

Kambalu's work, which references Situationism and the Chewa Nyau culture of his native Malawi, manifests in various media, from drawing, painting, installation, video to literature and performance.

One of his most well known artworks is Holy Ball, a football plastered in pages of the Bible. Kambalu held an exhibition of 24 "Holy Balls" at Chancellor College in 2000 at which he invited the visitors to “exercise and exorcise”. He has since shown his work internationally. In 2015 he was included in Okwui Enwezor's All the World's Futures at the 56th Venice Biennale. In November 2015 a judge in Venice dismissed a complaint filed by the Italian situationist Gianfranco Sanguinetti against the Venice Biennale and Kambalu with regard to the unauthorised and wholescale appropriation of Sanguinetti's entire archive for one of Kambalu's installations, Sanguinetti Breakout Area.

Kambalu's Nyau Cinema is a series of short film clips of psychogeographical performances, shared as interventions on social networking sites and as installations in galleries. These have been described as "cinematic fragments that blend slapstick and spiritual ritual".

His first book, an autobiographical narrative entitled The Jive Talker or How to Get a British Passport, was published by Jonathan Cape (Random House) in July 2008, and in August 2008 by Free Press (Simon & Schuster). His second novel, Uccello's Vineyard, published in 2012, is in The Book Lovers, a collection of artist novels at the Museum of Contemporary Art in Antwerp.

Kambalu is represented by Kate MacGarry in London and Galerie Nordenhake in Stockholm.

Kambalu’s sculpture Antelope was installed on Trafalgar Square’s Fourth Plinth from September 2022 to September 2024. The work restages a 1914 photograph of Baptist preacher and pan-Africanist John Chilembwe and European missionary John Chorley. In the image, Chilembwe wears a hat in an act of defiance, as it was illegal at the time for an African to wear a hat in front of a white person. The Guardian described the sculpture as “powerful and affecting,” noting how it highlighted histories of colonial resistance, while The Art Newspaper called it “a striking meditation on visibility and erasure in British history.”

== Exhibitions ==
=== Selected solo exhibitions ===
- 2017 – Red Barn Farm, Galerie Nordenhake, Stockholm, Sweden
- 2015 – The Unbearable Lightness of Nyau Cinema, Gallery U Mloka, Olomouc, Czech Republic
- 2015 – Double Feature: Nyau Cinema, Schirn Kunsthalle, Frankfurt, Germany
- 2014 – Sepia Rain, Stevenson Johannesburg, South Africa
- 2012 – Tattoo City: The First Three Chapters (with guests), Castlefield Gallery, Manchester, UK
- 2000 – Holyball Exercises and Exorcisms, Chancellor College, Zomba, Malawi

=== Selected group exhibitions ===
- 2016 – Liverpool Biennial, Liverpool, UK
- 2016 – Dakar Biennale, Dakar, Senegal
- 2016 – Lost & Found, Paradiso, Amsterdam, the Netherlands
- 2015 – Embodied, Nikolaj Kunsthal, Copenhagen, Denmark
- 2015 – 50/50, New Church Museum, Cape Town, South Africa
- 2015 – Transformation Marathon, Serpentine Galleries, London
- 2015 – Schema, Stevenson Cape Town, South Africa
- 2015 – All The World's Futures, Venice Biennale, Italy
- 2014 – Chroma, Stevenson Cape Town, South Africa
- 2014 – Dakar Biennale, Dakar, Senegal
- 2004 – Bloomberg New Contemporaries, Liverpool, UK

== Bibliography ==
=== Books ===
- 2012 – Uccello's Vineyard. ASIN: B009Z48N2Y
- 2008 – The Jive Talker or, How to Get a British Passport. ISBN 0-224-08106-3

=== Articles ===
- 2015, Entering the Arena: All the World's Futures, Art in Culture, South Korea, and Contemporary And
- 2014, Great African Minds: Dr Charles Chanthunya, Peter Hammer Verlag
- 2013, The Museum and the Individual, essay on Meschac Gaba's Museum of Contemporary African Art, Tate Modern
- 2011, Der skurrile Diktator, Kulturaustausch, IFA, Germany
- 2010, Dr Albert Schweitzer's Troublesome Young Brother, Kulturaustausch, IFA, Germany
- 2010, Windmill Jive, Salz Magazine, Austria
- 2009, Action Bitte – Malawians at Leisure, Kulturaustausch, IFA, Germany

== Residencies, fellowships and awards ==
- 2015, Research fellowship, Smithsonian Institution National Museum of African Art, Washington DC, USA
- 2014, Research fellowship, Yale Center for British Art, New Haven, USA
- 2013, AHRC PhD Research Award, UK
- 2005–10, The Fire Station Residency, ACME, London, UK
- 2004, Decibel Visual Arts Award, Arts Council
- 2000, Thami Mnyele Artist Residency, Amsterdam, the Netherlands
