= Malawi Young Pioneers =

Paramilitary group of the Malawi Congress Party

The Malawi Young Pioneers (MYP) were the paramilitary wing of the Malawi Congress Party. Their Commander-in-Chief was President Hastings Banda. They originally were supposed to function as a national youth service program with a development agenda. However, over time, they strayed away from this mission and became an intricate network of espionage and repression. The Young Pioneers organization was a major instrument of Dr Banda's one-party dictatorship and domestic terrorism. Pioneers bore arms, conducted espionage and intelligence operations, and were Banda's most trusted bodyguards around Hastings Kamuzu Banda. Both the Malawi Army and Police resented the Pioneers for usurping their roles as security agents.

== Early years (1964–1967) ==
The MYP was established in 1963. Up to 1967, The Young Pioneers, The Green Shirts, were mainly concerned with rural development work and political indoctrination. MYP instructors were placed in every Secondary School where they provided basic military training to pupils. They were also responsible for identifying potential candidates who would then be dispatched to MYP bases for more training during the three-month school vacations between July and October each year. Over time this responsibility disintegrated into a 'spying' role where instructors 'informed' against fellow school teachers resulting in arrests & expulsions. They came to be viewed as advocates of rural development as far as young members of society were concerned. By 1989 there were MYP training bases in each of the 24 districts into which the country was then divided. Structured around the Kibbutz model of Israel, the instruction methodology in Training Bases sought to introduce self-sufficiency and industry through training of recruits in improved methods of agriculture & carpentry. Because of their development-oriented agenda, the MYP were initially supported by the nation, and international community, including the Israel Government that made available technical assistance in the form of Israel Army instructors. MYP graduates received scholarships from Malawi and foreign governments in Europe. Over time the MYP branched off into business, enabling MYP entrepreneurs to pursue their dreams. The Spearhead Company, an MYP business unit, was created and soon spread its influence, alongside Dr. Banda's Press Corporation Limited throughout Malawi's economy. At one time Spearhead operated their own fleet of aeroplanes, Spearhead Airlines. During the early days this enabled the MYP to discern themselves from the Youth Leaguers, The Red Shirts, arm of The Malawi Congress Party in that they kept a respectable distance from the political excesses involved.

Politically, they were proponents of the 'positive side' of Kamuzuism, "the ideology that Dr Hastings Kamuzu Banda, as Father and Founder of the Malawi nation, was the fount of all wisdom and always knew what was best for the nation". They were instrumental in helping Banda consolidate his power from 1964. But after the 1973 oil crisis, as the Malawian economy went into a tailspin the MYP cadre increasing transformed into a 'militaristic' tool of oppression.

== Later years ==
Once trained, MYP were deployed to different parts of the country to work on rural development schemes. The big season for them, each year, was the month of April—a time of harvest in Malawi. Each year Dr. Banda would inaugurate the 'Youth Week'. This was a 'self-help' week when initially the Young Pioneers would hold parades, demonstrate their skills in various spheres of economic activity to underscore the contribution they were making to national development as well as affirm their loyalty to Dr Banda and his government. Over time the Youth Week was extended into a month-long event and other members of the Malawian society, school children and later University students, were drafted in to 'donate' their labor and sweat in various local projects, classroom construction, footpaths and bridge repairing etc. Gradually what began as freewill transformed into coercion, in order to divert international development funds earmarked for such projects. To ensure such 'slave labor' was readily available the MYP transformed into an overzealous 'third security force' policing party meetings, markets, bus stations, Youth Week Programs and extracting 'tithes' that had to be handed to Dr Banda during his annual 'crop inspection tours' and political rallies as 'gifts from his people'.

== Operation Bwezani ==
Operation Bwezani
Date	1992–1993
Location	Malawi
Result	Malawian victory: MYP violently dismantled

Belligerents
Malawi: Malawian Defence Force	Malawi Congress Party: Malawi Young Pioneers

By 1992, there were an estimated 6,000 armed Young Pioneers manning the various establishments of the organization. They conducted secret surveillance whilst they worked in farms, offices and warehouses, houses, garages, shops, training bases, etc. They were more or less adequately trained militarily, heavily armed, and thoroughly indoctrinated in the fashion of Kamuzuism. In addition, they had about 45,000 supporters that were recruited and worked as domestics, students, lecturers etc... that served as informants. They were dismantled violently after the 1993 elections during Operation Bwezani "Give Back" or "Return" that was conducted by the then army commander general Manken Chigawa. In this case they were returning arms that the Pioneers had refused to give up. At the height of the political transition to democracy in 1993, the Malawi Army disarmed the Young Pioneers raising fears that it would also intervene in the political process leading to democracy by trying to depose Banda.

Operation Bwezani gave the Malawi Army the political and social power to resist Banda's regime after 30 years. This has led some scholars to suggest that the army was serving the regime of Malawi regardless of policies of the regime since they had the power to overthrow the regime and the MYP for 30 years, but only acted after political intervention mandated it.

== Leaders ==
- Gwanda Chakuamba
- Bakili Muluzi
- John Tembo
- Manken Chigawa
