= Dick Matenje =

Former Malawian politician and cabinet minister

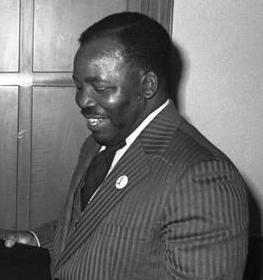
Matenje in 1976

Dick Matenje (died 1983) was a former Malawian politician and cabinet minister. He was the secretary-general of the Malawi Congress Party. He was one of the 'Mwanza Four' who mysteriously died during the Kamuzu Banda regime.

== Death ==
Matenje was Minister of Finance from 1972 to 1978. He mysteriously died on 18 May 1983, along with ministers Twaibu Sangala, Aaron Gadama and Member of Parliament David Chiwanga. The four were collectively known as the 'Mwanza Four'. They were known to be critical of aspects of the totalitarian rule of Kamuzu Banda. They died mysteriously in 1983. Their death was ruled as a traffic accident by the Kamuzu Banda regime, although independent investigations indicate that this may have not the case.

Kamuzu Banda, John Tembo, MacDonald Kalemba, Augustino Leston Likaomba, Mcwilliam Lunguzi and Cecilia Kadzamira, were arrested for and charged with the murder of the four in 1995, ten years after their death. They were acquitted due to lack of evidence.

== Film ==
- The Mwanza Accident (documentary), Jupat Video Services - 1995

== Personal ==
He is the father of Ambassador Steve Matenje.
