= David Chiwanga =

Malawian politician (died 1983)

David Chiwanga was a Malawian Member of Parliament who was one of the Mwanza Four. He was the MP for the Chikwawa District and was thought to be a secret critic of President Kamuzu Banda. He disappeared on 18 th May 1983 together with three cabinet ministers: Dick Matenje, Aaron Gadama, and Twaibu Sangala. Their deaths were ruled accidental by Kamuzu Banda. In 1995, seven people, including Kamuzu Banda, were brought to trial over the deaths but were acquitted due to lack of evidence.
