= Moffat Nyirenda =

Malawian physician

- Born: Karonga
- Education: University of Edinburgh; University of Malawi; University College London
- Scientific career
- Workplaces: London School of Hygiene & Tropical Medicine; University of Edinburgh
- Thesis: Glucocorticoids and the programming of hepatic glucose metabolism (1999)

Moffat Nyirenda is a Malawian physician who is Professor of Molecular Medicine and Director of the Medical Research Council/Uganda Virus Research Institute. He has served at the Southern Africa Consortium for Research Excellence. His research looks to understand the aetiology of non-communicable disease in Africa. He was elected a Fellow of the Academy of Medical Sciences in 2025.

== Early life and education ==
Nyirenda is from Karonga, a rural area in Malawi. He studied at Kamuzu Academy, sometimes described as the “Eton of Africa”. He was in the first cohort of students to graduate from the College of Medicine in Malawi, and completed his training between the University of Malawi and University College London. During his degree he took part in an intercalated Bachelor's in immunology. He completed a doctorate in molecular medicine at the University of Edinburgh, He was awarded an MRC Clinician Scientists Fellowship Award. In Edinburgh, Nyirenda studied developmental programming. He showed that prenatal exposure to glucocorticoids could predispose babies to diabetes later in life.

== Research and career ==
In 2010, Nyirenda returned to Malawi, where he was made Associate Director of the Malawi Liverpool Wellcome Research Programme. He joined the Medical Research Council/Uganda Virus Research Institute and London School of Hygiene & Tropical Medicine Uganda Research Unit. By 2013, he was appointed London School of Hygiene & Tropical Medicine Professor of Medicine.

Nyirenda looks to understand aetiology of non-communicable diseases, including the relationship between early life and environmental exposures and obesity and hypertension. He has contributed to genomic studies of non-communicable diseases in Sub-Saharan Africa, for example, in South Africa, young and lean people with Type 2 diabetes, which does not fit the Western stereotype.

Nyirenda has worked to build research capacity in Africa, and serves as Director of the Southern Africa Consortium for Research Excellence (SACORE) and Malawi Epidemiology and Intervention Research Unit (MEIRU). SACORE connects researchers across Malawi, Zambia and Zimbabwe. MEIRU, which had originally been established to investigate leprosy, expanded to tuberculosis and HIV. Through MEIRU Nyirenda investigated the epidemiological changes that are impacting metabolic diseases in Africa. Better management of HIV means that people live longer, which means they can “succumb to non-communicable diseases at a much younger age,”.

In 2024, Nyirenda was appointed Director of the Medical Research Council/Uganda Virus Research Institute and London School of Hygiene & Tropical Medicine Uganda Research Unit. In 2025, he was elected Fellow of the Academy of Medical Sciences.

== Selected publications ==
- M J Nyirenda; Robert S Lindsay; C J Kenyon; A Burchell; J R Seckl (1 May 1998). "Glucocorticoid exposure in late gestation permanently programs rat hepatic phosphoenolpyruvate carboxykinase and glucocorticoid receptor expression and causes glucose intolerance in adult offspring". Journal of Clinical Investigation. 101 (10): 2174–2181. doi:10.1172/jci1567. ISSN 0021-9738. PMC 508805. PMID 9593773. Wikidata Q37382023.
- Rifat Atun; Shabbar Jaffar; Sania Nishtar; Felicia M Knaul; Mauricio Lima Barreto; Moffat Nyirenda; Nicholas Banatvala; Peter Piot (12 February 2013). "Improving responsiveness of health systems to non-communicable diseases". The Lancet. 381 (9867): 690–697. doi:10.1016/s0140-6736(13)60063-x. ISSN 0140-6736. PMID 23410609. Wikidata Q45416594.
- J. A. McCormick; V. Lyons; M. D. Jacobson; et al. (1 April 2000). "5'-heterogeneity of glucocorticoid receptor messenger RNA is tissue specific: differential regulation of variant transcripts by early-life events". Molecular Endocrinology. 14 (4): 506–517. doi:10.1210/mend.14.4.0438. ISSN 0888-8809. PMID 10770488. Wikidata Q47868032.
