= Fiona Denison =

Scottish doctor and academic (1970–2022)

Fiona Charlotte Denison (1970 – 9 January 2022) was a Scottish doctor and academic. She was the Professor and Honorary Consultant in Maternal and Fetal Medicine at the University of Edinburgh, founder of Birthing Solutions Ltd, and creator of the Birth Mirror.

== Life and career ==
Denison was born in Morningside, Edinburgh, Midlothian, in 1970. She was a consultant obstetrician and reader in Maternal and Fetal Health at the Medical Research Council (MRC) Centre for Reproductive Health. She was a principal investigator for The Edinburgh Tommy's Centre for Maternal and Fetal Health, a research centre focusing on maternal obesity which sits within the MRC Centre for Reproductive Health.

In 2011, Denison was awarded a research grant from Action Medical Research for £96,450 to investigate new imaging techniques to predict pregnancy complications.

Denison died in Edinburgh on 9 January 2022, at the age of 51. She died by suicide after contracting COVID-19 for the second time, which deteriorated her health.

== Awards and honours ==
In 2017, Denison won a number of awards for her Birth Mirror, an adjustable, waterproof mirror to assist midwives in water births:

- The Converge Challenge KickStart Digital Entrepreneur Award.
- Shortlisted as a semi-finalist in the Scottish EDGE11 WildCard Award finalist, awarded £10,000.
- The Medicity DEVELOP prize for customer discovery.
- The Medicity DEVELOP Engage Invest Exploit Prize.
- The Medicity DEVELOP runner-up Prize.

Denison was a finalist in the 2013 NHS Lothian Health Hero awards, nominated by one of her patients for Denison's concern for patient wellbeing.
