= Twaibu Sangala =

Malawian politician (died 1983)

Twaibumohamedi John Twaibu Sangala was a Malawian cabinet Minister and one of the Mwanza four. He was from Dedza district Traditional Authority Tambala, where he was later buried. The function was organised by the then ruling party UNITED DEMOCRATIC FRONT (UDF) under the leadership of Bakili Muluzi, the first democratically elected president in Malawi He was the Minister of Health for Malawi. He died in a mysterious death on 18 May 1983 together with two other cabinet ministers Aaron Gadama and Dick Matenje– and Member of Parliament David Chiwanga. Their deaths were ruled as a 'traffic accident' by the Kamuzu Banda regime.

In 1995, seven people were accused of his death including Kamuzu Banda, but were acquitted due to lack of evidence.
