= Kasungu =

- Location in Malawi
- Coordinates: 13°02′S 33°29′E
- Country: Malawi
- Region: Central Region
- District: Kasungu District
- Elevation: 4,403 ft (1,342 m)

Population (2018 Census)
  - Total: 58,653
- Time zone: +2
- Climate: Cwa

Kasungu is a town in the Kasungu District of the Central Region of Malawi. The population of Kasungu was 58,653 according to the 2018 census. Kasungu is approximately 130 kilometres (81 mi) north-west of the capital of Malawi, Lilongwe, and is 35 kilometres (22 mi) east of Kasungu National Park. The main industry in Kasungu is tobacco-growing.

== Geography and climate ==
Kasungu is in central Malawi, lying at an elevation of 1,342 metres (4,403 ft). It has a humid subtropical climate (Köppen: Cwa) and a rainy season that lasts from November–December to March–April. The dry season lasts from May to October. The town receives, on average, between 500–1,200 millimetres (20–47 in) rainfall each year.

Climate data for Kasungu (1991-2021 normals, sun hours 1999-2019 normals)
Month	Jan	Feb	Mar	Apr	May	Jun	Jul	Aug	Sep	Oct	Nov	Dec	Year
Mean daily maximum °C (°F)	25.8 (78.4)	25.7 (78.3)	25.5 (77.9)	25.4 (77.7)	25.3 (77.5)	23.8 (74.8)	23.4 (74.1)	25.4 (77.7)	28 (82)	29.9 (85.8)	30.2 (86.4)	27.6 (81.7)	26.3 (79.4)
Daily mean °C (°F)	22.2 (72.0)	22.1 (71.8)	21.8 (71.2)	21.0 (69.8)	19.7 (67.5)	17.8 (64.0)	17.4 (63.3)	19.4 (66.9)	22.1 (71.8)	24.3 (75.7)	24.9 (76.8)	23.4 (74.1)	21.3 (70.4)
Mean daily minimum °C (°F)	18.6 (65.5)	18.4 (65.1)	18.1 (64.6)	16.5 (61.7)	14.1 (57.4)	11.8 (53.2)	11.3 (52.3)	13.3 (55.9)	16.1 (61.0)	18.7 (65.7)	19.5 (67.1)	19.1 (66.4)	16.3 (61.3)
Average precipitation mm (inches)	186 (7.3)	156 (6.1)	108 (4.3)	31 (1.2)	5 (0.2)	1 (0.0)	2 (0.1)	2 (0.1)	1 (0.0)	9 (0.4)	37 (1.5)	138 (5.4)	676 (26.6)
Average precipitation days (≥ 0.1 mm)	18	16	15	6	1	0	0	0	0	1	5	14	76
Average relative humidity (%)	82	83	83	73	62	58	56	50	45	46	55	73	64
Mean monthly sunshine hours	238.7	201.6	204.6	207.0	266.6	267.0	275.9	300.7	306.0	319.3	297.0	254.2	3,138.6
Mean daily sunshine hours	7.7	7.2	6.6	6.9	8.6	8.9	8.9	9.7	10.2	10.3	9.9	8.2	8.6
Source: Climate-Data.org

== Demographics ==
Year	Population
1987	11,591
1998	27,754
2008	39,640
2018	58,653

Historical population
Year	Pop.	±% p.a.
1987	11,591	—
1998	27,754	+8.26%
2008	39,640	+3.63%
2018	58,653	+4.00%

=== Language ===
Chichewa is the main language spoken in Kasungu.

== Facilities ==
=== Transport ===
Kasungu is served by buses and minibuses that travel to Lilongwe and Mzuzu. In June 2008, Central East Africa Railways announced plans to extend the rail line from Lilongwe to Kasungu.

=== Amenities ===
There are guesthouses, bars, restaurants, and four petrol stations in Kasungu; according to Lonely Planet, there are "no major attractions" in Kasungu. Kasungu National Park is an hour's drive to the west, and Kamuzu Academy is 25 minutes by road to the east.

=== Emergency services ===
Kasungu has a police station. The town is also home to a 179-bed government-funded district hospital. The hospital is often overcrowded, and suffers from a lack of nurses and anti-retroviral drugs. The hospital's 13-bed paediatric department can receive over 100 patients, leaving some patients on the floor. UNICEF-Hamburg has sent over US$6000 to train care-workers in Kasungu.

== Land and economy ==
The land in Kasungu lacks nutrients and water, and is mostly "sand veld"; the Kasungu area is suffering from depleted forests. A tribal chief stated in 2004 that over 250,000 people in Kasungu own no land. Tobacco is the only cash crop grown in Kasungu district, and the area has been described as a "tobacco heartland" by Xinhua News Agency. The opening of Kasungu National Park in 1970 has increased tourism in the area. Due to their poverty, most residents of Kasungu live in houses made of hand-made mud bricks, covered by roofs of straw or corrugated iron. According to AllAfrica, Kasungu is a "child labour hotspot."

== Politics ==
Kasungu is a "stronghold" of the Malawi Congress Party. The Member of the Malawian Parliament for Kasungu Central is Allan Kabuluzi. The MP for Kasungu North North West is Rodger Sithole, and the MP for Kasungu North West is Gerald Jere.

== Foreign links ==
Kaluluma School in Kasungu has formed a relationship with Greenford High School, Southall, England. A church in Kasungu also formed a relationship with two churches near Peterborough, England, in 2001. Parishioners from the two churches have travelled to Kasungu several times and have built a new church and a fish farm. In February 2008, the church group built a maize mill in Kasungu.

== Notable events ==
=== Famine and disease ===
Over 100 people died in a famine in 2002, according to official estimates; Kasungu was the worst affected area in Malawi. In 2005 a famine occurred in Malawi, affecting 4.2 million Malawians. The efforts to distribute food to the needy were concentrated in Kasungu. During 2004 and 2005, there was an outbreak of cholera, with eight people recorded to have suffered the disease.

=== June 2003 riots ===
In June 2003, Kasungu Muslims rioted with police, after five Malawians, suspected of being al-Qaeda operatives, were arrested and taken into United States custody. One demonstrator was treated for "serious gunshot wounds".

=== Chess championships ===
In January 2008, the African Junior Chess Championships were held at Kamuzu Academy near Kasungu. The academy, which The Nyasa Times describes as "highly regarded" and "Eton in the bush", was founded by the first President of Malawi, Hastings Banda.

== Notable people ==
- Hastings Banda, the first President of Malawi who grew up on a farm close to the city
- William Kamkwamba, Malawian inventor, engineer, and author

== See also ==
- Kasungu National Park
