= Aaron Gadama =

Malawian politician (died 1983)

Aaron Eliot Gadama was a former Malawian cabinet Minister and one of the 'Mwanza Four'. He was born in Kasungu District and is thought to be a relative of President Kamuzu Banda.

He was a Minister for the Central Region, and a Leader of the House. He was one of the original trustees of Press Trust.

He died mysteriously on 18 May 1983 together with Ministers Dick Matenje, and Twaibu Sangala as well as Member of parliament, David Chiwanga. Their bodies were found in Mozambique. The Banda government reported his death as a 'traffic accident. In 1995, seven people were accused of his death including Kamuzu Banda, but were acquitted due to lack of evidence.

== Film and drama ==
- The Mwanza Accident (Documentary) - 1995
- The dramatic character Chibale Sakumbira is a political reference to Gadama and the Mwanza Incident.
