= Outline of Malawi =

Overview of and topical guide to Malawi

The Flag of Malawi

The Coat of arms of Malawi

The location of Malawi

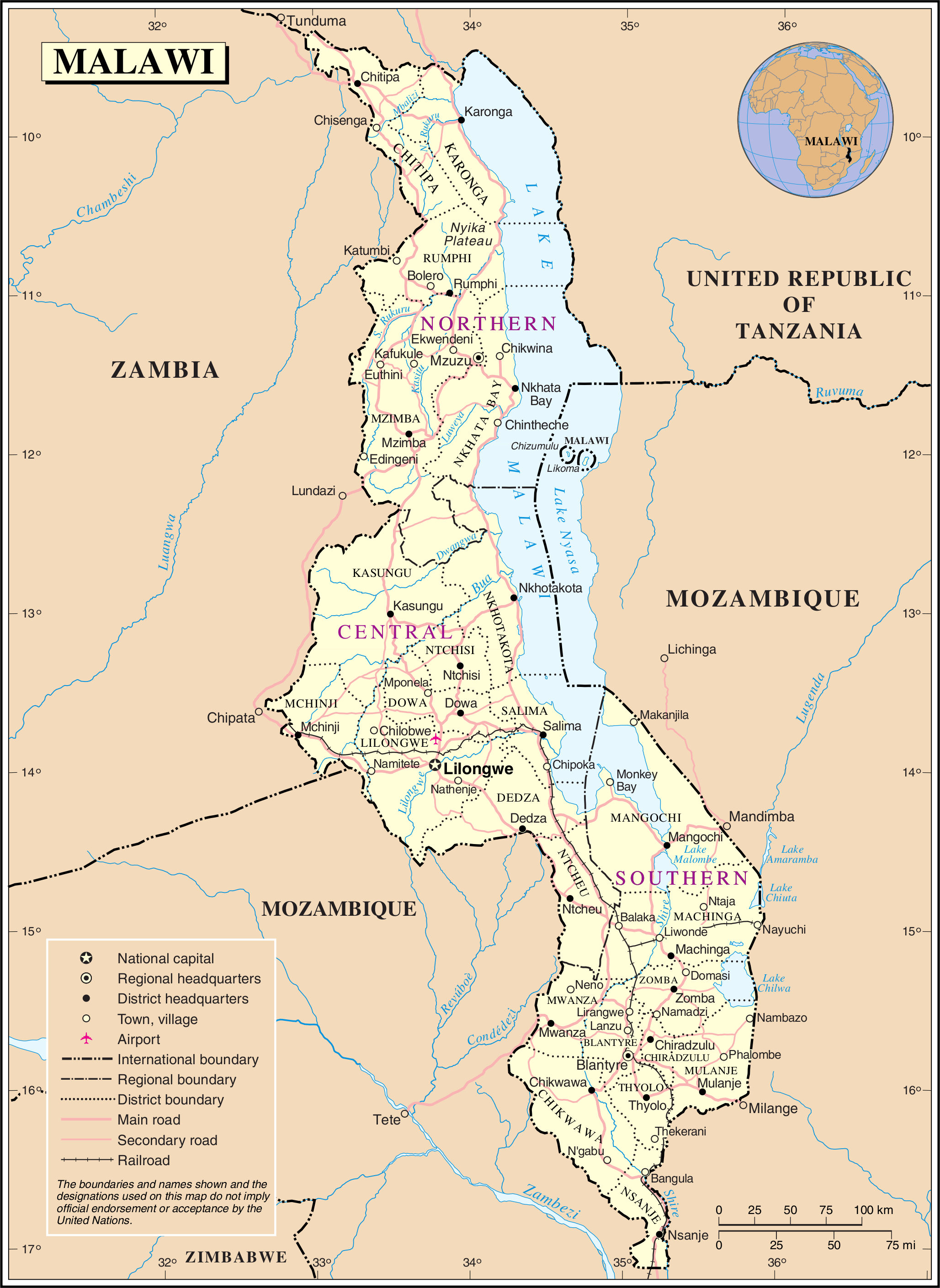
An enlargeable map of the Republic of Malawi

Republic of Malawi – sovereign country located in southeastern Africa. Malawi is bordered by Zambia to the northwest, Tanzania to the north and Mozambique, which surrounds it on the east, south and west and is separated from Malawi by Lake Malawi (also Lake Nyasa). The origin of the name Malawi is unclear; it is either derived from that of southern tribes, or from the "glitter of the sun rising across the lake" (as seen in its flag). Malawi is a densely populated country with a democratically-elected, presidential system of government.

The following outline is provided as an overview of and topical guide to Malawi:

== General reference ==
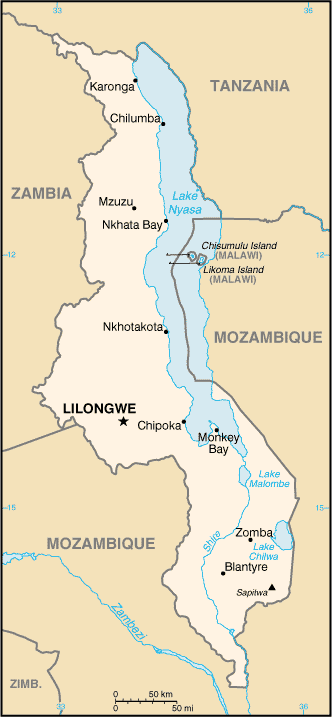
An enlargeable basic map of Malawi

- Pronunciation: /məˈlɔːwi/, /məˈlɑːwi/ or /ˈmæləwi/
- Common English country name: Malawi
- Official English country name: The Republic of Malawi
- Common endonym(s):
- Official endonym(s):
- Adjectival(s): Malawian
- Demonym(s): Malawian(s)
- International rankings of Malawi
- ISO country codes: MW, MWI, 454
- ISO region codes: See ISO 3166-2:MW
- Internet country code top-level domain: .mw

== Geography of Malawi ==
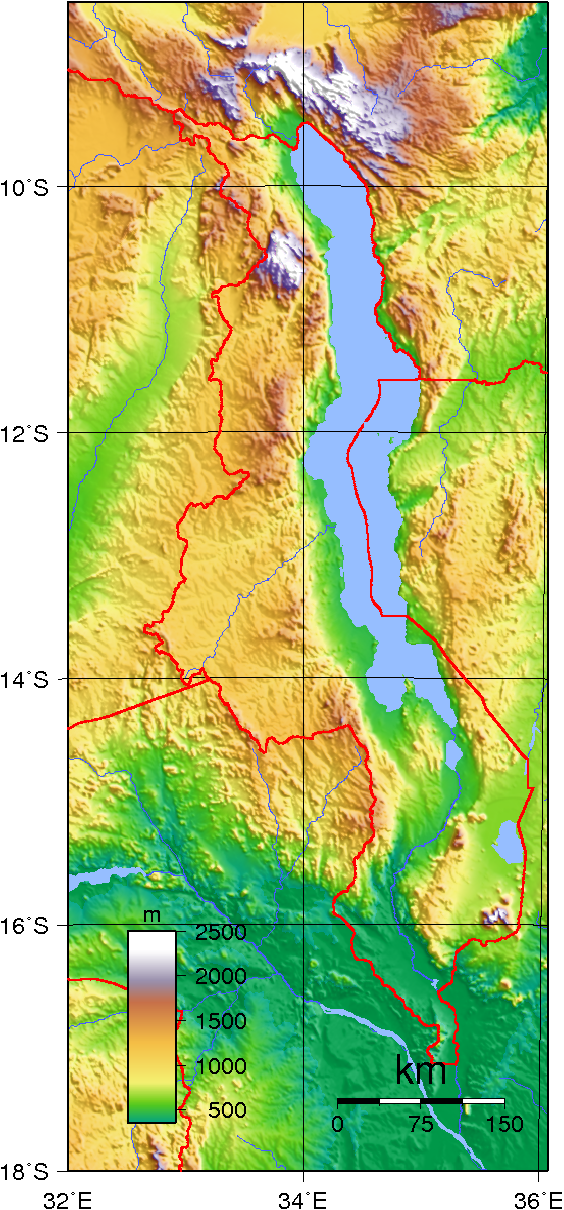
An enlargeable topographic map of Malawi

Geography of Malawi

- Malawi is: a landlocked country
- Location:
  - Eastern Hemisphere and Southern Hemisphere
  - Africa
    - East Africa
    - Southern Africa
  - Time zone: Central Africa Time (UTC+02)
  - Extreme points of Malawi
    - High: Sapitwa (Mulanje Massif) 3,002 m (9,849 ft)
    - Low: Shire River 37 m (121 ft)
  - Land boundaries: 2,881 km

Mozambique 1,569 km
Zambia 837 km
Tanzania 475 km

- Coastline: none

- Population of Malawi:

19,129,952 (62nd)

- Area of Malawi:
- Atlas of Malawi

=== Environment of Malawi ===
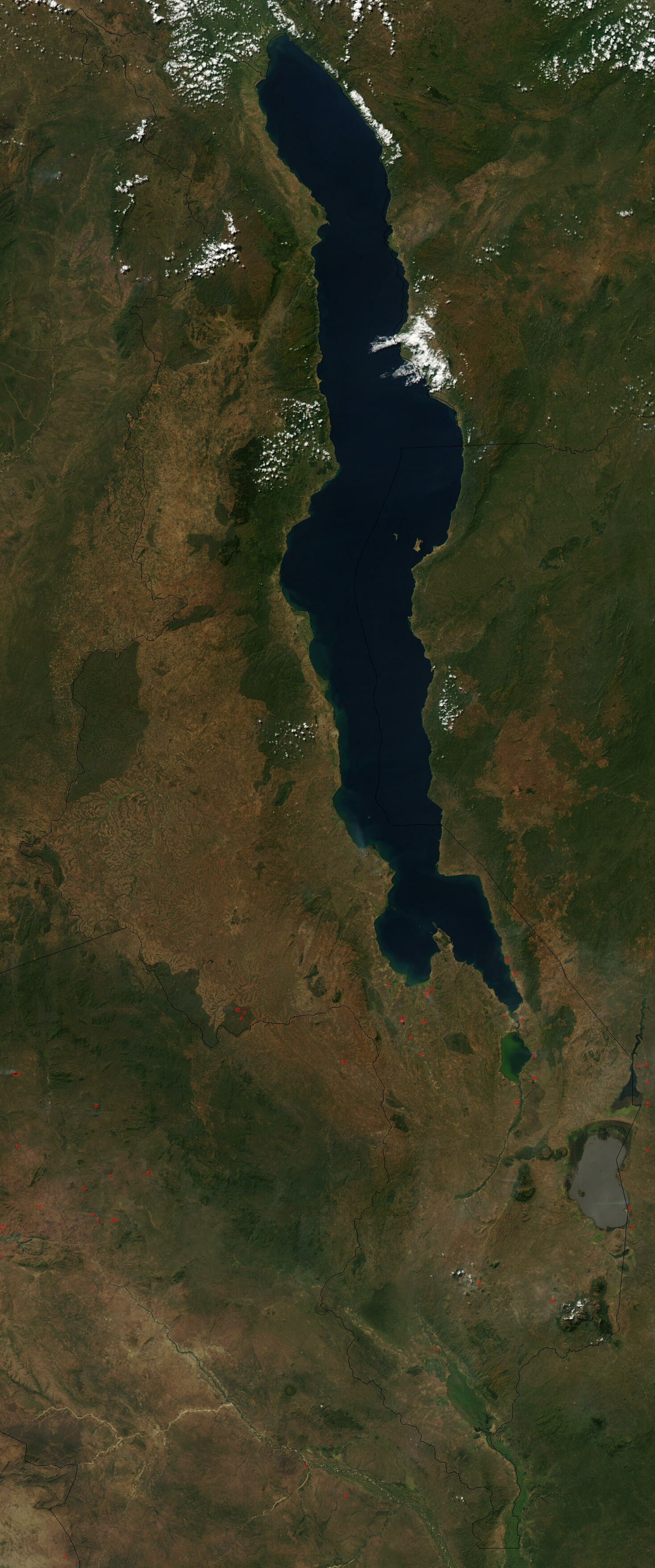
An enlargeable satellite image of Malawi

- Climate of Malawi
- Ecoregions in Malawi
- Protected areas of Malawi
  - National parks of Malawi
- Wildlife of Malawi
  - Fauna of Malawi
    - Birds of Malawi
    - Mammals of Malawi

==== Natural geographic features of Malawi ====
- Glaciers of Malawi: none
- Islands of Malawi
- Rivers of Malawi
- World Heritage Sites in Malawi

=== Regions of Malawi ===
==== Ecoregions of Malawi ====
List of ecoregions in Malawi

- Ecoregions in Malawi

==== Administrative divisions of Malawi ====
Administrative divisions of Malawi

- Regions of Malawi
  - Districts of Malawi
- Capital of Malawi: Capital of Malawi
- Cities of Malawi

=== Demography of Malawi ===
Demographics of Malawi

== Government and politics of Malawi ==
Politics of Malawi

- Form of government:
- Capital of Malawi: Lilongwe
- Elections in Malawi
- Political parties in Malawi

=== Branches of the government of Malawi ===
Government of Malawi

==== Executive branch of the government of Malawi ====
- Head of state and Head of Government: President of Malawi, Peter Mutharika
- Cabinet of Malawi

==== Legislative branch of the government of Malawi ====
- National Assembly of Malawi (unicameral)

==== Judicial branch of the government of Malawi ====
Court system of Malawi

- Supreme Court of Malawi
- Traditional Courts in Malawi

=== Foreign relations of Malawi ===
Foreign relations of Malawi

- Diplomatic missions in Malawi
- Diplomatic missions of Malawi

==== International organization membership ====
The Republic of Malawi is a member of:

- African, Caribbean, and Pacific Group of States (ACP)
- African Development Bank Group (AfDB)
- African Union/United Nations Hybrid operation in Darfur (UNAMID)
- Common Market for Eastern and Southern Africa (COMESA)
- Commonwealth of Nations
- Food and Agriculture Organization (FAO)
- Group of 77 (G77)
- International Atomic Energy Agency (IAEA)
- International Bank for Reconstruction and Development (IBRD)
- International Civil Aviation Organization (ICAO)
- International Criminal Court (ICCt)
- International Criminal Police Organization (Interpol)
- International Development Association (IDA)
- International Federation of Red Cross and Red Crescent Societies (IFRCS)
- International Finance Corporation (IFC)
- International Fund for Agricultural Development (IFAD)
- International Labour Organization (ILO)
- International Maritime Organization (IMO)
- International Monetary Fund (IMF)
- International Olympic Committee (IOC)
- International Organization for Standardization (ISO) (correspondent)
- International Red Cross and Red Crescent Movement (ICRM)
- International Telecommunication Union (ITU)
- International Telecommunications Satellite Organization (ITSO)
- International Trade Union Confederation (ITUC)
- Multilateral Investment Guarantee Agency (MIGA)
- Nonaligned Movement (NAM)
- Organisation for the Prohibition of Chemical Weapons (OPCW)
- Southern African Development Community (SADC)
- United Nations (UN)
- United Nations Conference on Trade and Development (UNCTAD)
- United Nations Educational, Scientific, and Cultural Organization (UNESCO)
- United Nations Industrial Development Organization (UNIDO)
- United Nations Mission in Liberia (UNMIL)
- United Nations Mission in the Sudan (UNMIS)
- United Nations Organization Mission in the Democratic Republic of the Congo (MONUC)
- Universal Postal Union (UPU)
- World Confederation of Labour (WCL)
- World Customs Organization (WCO)
- World Federation of Trade Unions (WFTU)
- World Health Organization (WHO)
- World Intellectual Property Organization (WIPO)
- World Meteorological Organization (WMO)
- World Tourism Organization (UNWTO)
- World Trade Organization (WTO)

=== Law and order in Malawi ===
Law of Malawi

- Law Enforcement in Malawi
- Constitution of Malawi
- Human rights in Malawi
  - Abortion in Malawi
  - LGBT rights in Malawi

=== Military of Malawi ===
Military of Malawi

- Command
  - Commander-in-chief: President of Malawi
- Forces
  - Army of Malawi
  - Air Force of Malawi

=== Local government in Malawi ===
Local government in Malawi

== History of Malawi ==
History of Malawi

=== History by topic ===
- Archaeology of Malawi
- History of rail transport in Malawi
- History of the Jews in Malawi
- Postage stamps and postal history of British Central Africa

== Culture of Malawi ==
Culture of Malawi

- Cuisine of Malawi
- Languages of Malawi
- Media in Malawi
- National symbols of Malawi
  - Coat of arms of Malawi
  - Flag of Malawi
  - National anthem of Malawi
- Public holidays in Malawi
- Religion in Malawi
  - Christianity in Malawi
    - St Michael and All Angels Church, Blantyre, Malawi
  - Hinduism in Malawi
  - Islam in Malawi
- World Heritage Sites in Malawi

=== Art in Malawi ===
- Music of Malawi

=== Sports in Malawi ===
Sports in Malawi

- Football in Malawi
  - Kamuzu Stadium
- Malawi at the Olympics

== Economy and infrastructure of Malawi ==
Economy of Malawi

- Economic rank, by nominal GDP (2025): 146th (one hundred and forty sixth)
- Agriculture in Malawi
- Banking in Malawi
  - National Bank of Malawi
- Communications in Malawi
  - Internet in Malawi
- Companies of Malawi
- Currency of Malawi: Kwacha
  - ISO 4217: MWK
- Health care in Malawi
- Mining in Malawi
- Malawi Stock Exchange
- Tourism in Malawi
- Transport in Malawi
  - Airports in Malawi
  - Rail transport in Malawi

== Education in Malawi ==
Education in Malawi

== Health in Malawi ==
Health in Malawi

== See also ==
Malawi

- List of international rankings
- List of Malawi-related topics
- Member state of the Commonwealth of Nations
- Member state of the United Nations
- Outline of Africa
- Outline of geography
