= Geography of Malawi =

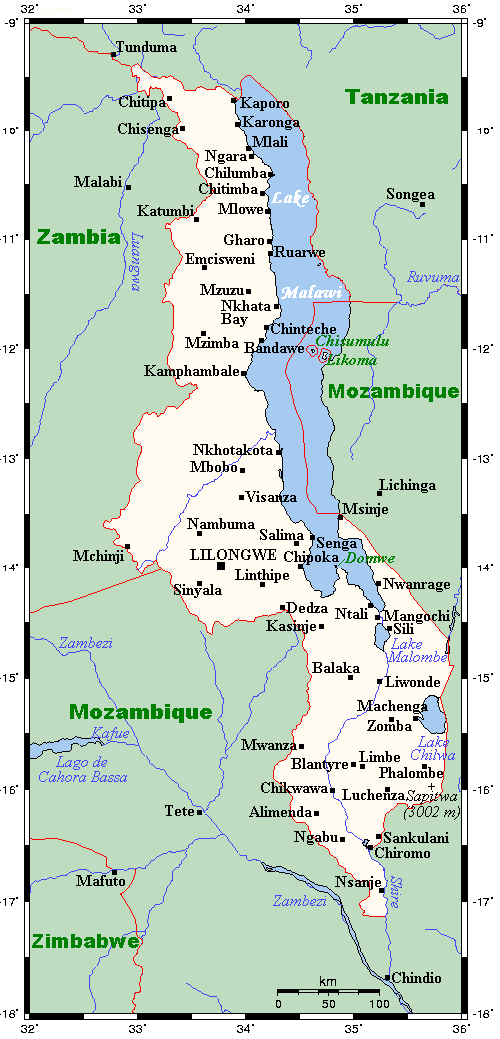
Malawi's cities, towns and larger villages

Location of Malawi

Malawi is a landlocked country in southeast Africa. It is wholly within the tropics; from about 9.30°S at its northernmost point to about 17°S at the southernmost tip. The country occupies a thin strip of land between Zambia and Mozambique, extending southwards into Mozambique along the valley of the Shire River. In the north and north east it also shares a border with Tanzania. Malawi is connected by rail to the Mozambican ports of Nacala and Beira. It lies between latitudes 9° and 18°S, and longitudes 32° and 36°E.

The Great Rift Valley runs through the country from north to south. Lake Malawi lies within the rift valley, making up over three-quarters of Malawi's eastern boundary. The Shire River flows down the rift valley from the south end of the lake to join the Zambezi River farther south in Mozambique.

Plateaus and mountains lie to the east and west of the Rift Valley. The Nyika Plateau lies west of Lake Malawi in the north of the country. The Shire Highlands lie in southern Malawi, east of the rift valley and Shire River and south of Lake Malawi. The Zomba and Mulanje mountain peaks rise from the highlands to respective heights of 2,100 and 3,000 metres (7,000 and 10,000 feet).

Malawi has two sites listed on the UNESCO World Heritage List. Lake Malawi National Park was first listed in 1984 and the Chongoni Rock Art Area was listed in 2006. Malawi's climate is hot in the low-lying areas in the south of the country and temperate in the northern highlands.

== Geography ==
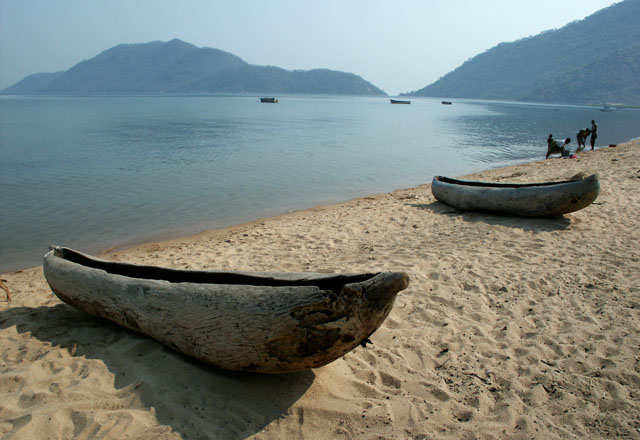
Two small dugout canoes on the shore of Lake Malawi

The Great Rift Valley traverses the country from north to south. In this deep trough lies Lake Malawi (also called Lake Nyasa), the third-largest lake in Africa, comprising about 25% of Malawi's area. Lake Malawi is sometimes called the Calendar Lake as it is about 587 km (365 mi) long and 84 km (52 mi) wide. The surface of Lake Malawi is located at 460 m (1,500 ft) above sea level, with a maximum depth of 700 m (2,300 ft), which means the lake bottom is over 210 m (700 ft) below sea level at some points. The Shire River flows from the south end of the lake and joins the Zambezi River 400 km (250 mi) south in Mozambique.

West of the Great Rift Valley, the land forms high plateaus, plateaus rise generally 910 to 1,220 m (3,000 to 4,000 ft) above sea level. In the north, the Nyika Uplands rise as high as 2,400 m (8,000 ft). The area to the west of the lake in northern and central Malawi has been categorised by the World Wildlife Fund as part of the Central Zambezian miombo woodlands ecoregion.

South of the lake lie the Shire Highlands, with an elevation of 600–1,600 m (2,000–5,200 ft), rising to elevations of 2,130 and 3,002 m (6,988 and 9,849 ft) at the Zomba Plateau and Mulanje Massif respectively. The Kirk Range lies west of the Shire, and forms the border with Mozambique. In its middle stretch between Chigaru and Chikwawa, the Shire River drops almost 400 m (1,300 ft) through 80 km (50 mi) of gorges, rapids, and cataracts. In the extreme south, the Shire enters the Zambezi lowlands, and the elevation is only 60–90 m (200–300 ft) above sea level.

Malawi has five national parks:

- Cape Maclear National Park
- Kasungu National Park
- Lengwe National Park
- Liwonde National Park
- Nyika National Park

== Climate ==
Malawi's climate is generally tropical. The altitude moderates what would be an otherwise equatorial climate. Between November and April the temperature is warm with equatorial rains and thunderstorms, with the storms reaching their peak severity in late March. After March, the rainfall rapidly diminishes and from May to September wet mists float from the highlands into the plateaus, with almost no rainfall during these months.

It is hot and humid from September to April along the lake and in the lower Shire Valley, with average daytime maximum around 27 to 29 °C (80.6 to 84.2 °F). Lilongwe is also hot and humid during these months, albeit far less than in the south. The rest of the country is warm during those months with a maximum temperature during the day around 25 °C (77 °F). From June through August, the lake areas and south are comfortably warm, with daytime maxima of around 23 °C (73.4 °F), but the rest of Malawi can be chilly at night, with temperatures ranging from 10–14 °C (50.0–57.2 °F). High altitude areas such as Mulanje and Nyika are often cold at night (around 6–8 °C or 42.8–46.4 °F) during June and July.

Karonga in the far north shows little variation in temperature with maximum daytime temperature remaining around 25 to 26 °C (77.0 to 78.8 °F) all year round but is unusual in that April and May are the wettest times of the year due to strengthening southerly winds along the lake.

Climate data for Lilongwe (extremes 1981–present)
Month	Jan	Feb	Mar	Apr	May	Jun	Jul	Aug	Sep	Oct	Nov	Dec	Year
Record high °C (°F)	32.5 (90.5)	31.2 (88.2)	30.2 (86.4)	30.5 (86.9)	31.5 (88.7)	28.0 (82.4)	29.2 (84.6)	29.5 (85.1)	33.1 (91.6)	34.5 (94.1)	34.2 (93.6)	32.4 (90.3)	34.5 (94.1)
Mean daily maximum °C (°F)	24.8 (76.6)	24.9 (76.8)	24.7 (76.5)	24.7 (76.5)	23.2 (73.8)	22.0 (71.6)	21.4 (70.5)	22.6 (72.7)	25.9 (78.6)	27.4 (81.3)	27.3 (81.1)	25.6 (78.1)	24.6 (76.3)
Daily mean °C (°F)	21.2 (70.2)	21.1 (70.0)	21.1 (70.0)	20.2 (68.4)	18.3 (64.9)	16.2 (61.2)	16.1 (61.0)	17.3 (63.1)	20.6 (69.1)	22.4 (72.3)	22.9 (73.2)	21.8 (71.2)	19.8 (67.6)
Mean daily minimum °C (°F)	18.2 (64.8)	17.7 (63.9)	17.3 (63.1)	15.8 (60.4)	13.1 (55.6)	10.1 (50.2)	9.9 (49.8)	11.1 (52.0)	13.8 (56.8)	16.8 (62.2)	18.5 (65.3)	18.3 (64.9)	15.1 (59.2)
Record low °C (°F)	11.8 (53.2)	11.7 (53.1)	11.3 (52.3)	8.1 (46.6)	3.0 (37.4)	0.5 (32.9)	0.1 (32.2)	1.4 (34.5)	5.1 (41.2)	7.9 (46.2)	10.0 (50.0)	11.8 (53.2)	0.1 (32.2)
Average precipitation mm (inches)	223 (8.8)	187 (7.4)	128 (5.0)	44 (1.7)	12 (0.5)	1 (0.0)	0 (0)	0 (0)	1 (0.0)	10 (0.4)	63 (2.5)	199 (7.8)	869 (34.2)
Average precipitation days (≥ 0.1 mm)	18	16	15	8	4	1	1	1	0	2	8	17	91
Average relative humidity (%)	83	83	82	78	74	69	65	60	52	53	62	78	69
Mean monthly sunshine hours	136.4	144.1	170.5	213.0	263.5	243.0	241.8	263.5	294.0	282.1	234.0	139.5	2,625.4
Mean daily sunshine hours	4.4	5.1	5.5	7.1	8.5	8.1	7.8	8.5	9.8	9.1	7.8	4.5	7.2
Source 1: Deutscher Wetterdienst
Source 2: Meteo Climat (record highs and lows)

Climate data for Blantyre (Chileka International Airport) 1961–1990, extremes 1939–present
Month	Jan	Feb	Mar	Apr	May	Jun	Jul	Aug	Sep	Oct	Nov	Dec	Year
Record high °C (°F)	36.7 (98.1)	37.4 (99.3)	38.3 (100.9)	33.8 (92.8)	33.7 (92.7)	31.7 (89.1)	38.0 (100.4)	33.3 (91.9)	38.6 (101.5)	39.5 (103.1)	39.5 (103.1)	36.5 (97.7)	39.5 (103.1)
Mean daily maximum °C (°F)	28.4 (83.1)	28.3 (82.9)	27.8 (82.0)	27.2 (81.0)	25.9 (78.6)	24.1 (75.4)	23.9 (75.0)	26.1 (79.0)	29.2 (84.6)	31.3 (88.3)	30.7 (87.3)	29.2 (84.6)	27.7 (81.9)
Daily mean °C (°F)	23.5 (74.3)	23.4 (74.1)	23.2 (73.8)	22.2 (72.0)	20.3 (68.5)	18.5 (65.3)	18.4 (65.1)	20.0 (68.0)	23.1 (73.6)	25.0 (77.0)	25.0 (77.0)	24.0 (75.2)	22.2 (72.0)
Mean daily minimum °C (°F)	20.1 (68.2)	19.9 (67.8)	19.3 (66.7)	17.9 (64.2)	15.6 (60.1)	13.6 (56.5)	13.3 (55.9)	14.5 (58.1)	17.1 (62.8)	19.5 (67.1)	20.3 (68.5)	20.2 (68.4)	17.6 (63.7)
Record low °C (°F)	10.2 (50.4)	14.0 (57.2)	15.8 (60.4)	9.6 (49.3)	9.1 (48.4)	6.0 (42.8)	9.0 (48.2)	10.0 (50.0)	7.6 (45.7)	9.5 (49.1)	11.6 (52.9)	14.0 (57.2)	6.0 (42.8)
Average precipitation mm (inches)	198.0 (7.80)	181.4 (7.14)	152.0 (5.98)	45.9 (1.81)	9.9 (0.39)	2.1 (0.08)	2.4 (0.09)	1.2 (0.05)	3.5 (0.14)	29.2 (1.15)	93.0 (3.66)	178.0 (7.01)	896.6 (35.30)
Average precipitation days (≥ 0.3 mm)	16	14	12	6	2	2	2	1	2	4	8	14	83
Average relative humidity (%)	79	80	78	75	69	66	64	50	52	53	61	75	67
Mean monthly sunshine hours	198.4	182.0	217.0	237.0	260.4	237.0	232.3	260.4	270.0	275.9	228.0	198.4	2,797
Mean daily sunshine hours	6.4	6.5	7.0	7.9	8.4	7.9	7.5	8.4	9.0	8.9	7.6	6.4	7.7
Source 1: NOAA
Source 2: Meteo Climat (record highs and lows)

Climate data for Karonga (1961-1990 normals)
Month	Jan	Feb	Mar	Apr	May	Jun	Jul	Aug	Sep	Oct	Nov	Dec	Year
Mean daily maximum °C (°F)	29.6 (85.3)	29.6 (85.3)	29.3 (84.7)	29.0 (84.2)	28.7 (83.7)	27.6 (81.7)	27.3 (81.1)	28.3 (82.9)	30.6 (87.1)	32.5 (90.5)	32.4 (90.3)	30.5 (86.9)	29.6 (85.3)
Daily mean °C (°F)	24.9 (76.8)	25.0 (77.0)	24.7 (76.5)	24.6 (76.3)	23.6 (74.5)	22.2 (72.0)	21.7 (71.1)	22.4 (72.3)	24.3 (75.7)	26.4 (79.5)	27.0 (80.6)	25.7 (78.3)	24.4 (75.9)
Mean daily minimum °C (°F)	21.8 (71.2)	21.7 (71.1)	21.5 (70.7)	21.3 (70.3)	19.9 (67.8)	17.9 (64.2)	17.0 (62.6)	17.6 (63.7)	19.4 (66.9)	21.9 (71.4)	23.0 (73.4)	22.4 (72.3)	20.4 (68.7)
Average precipitation mm (inches)	132.3 (5.21)	120.0 (4.72)	206.0 (8.11)	130.0 (5.12)	19.4 (0.76)	0.8 (0.03)	0.8 (0.03)	0.3 (0.01)	0.0 (0.0)	1.3 (0.05)	39.4 (1.55)	149.0 (5.87)	799.3 (31.47)
Average relative humidity (%)	79	80	82	80	74	66	65	64	60	56	62	75	70
Mean monthly sunshine hours	176.7	170.8	207.7	222.0	254.2	264.0	285.2	306.9	306.0	319.3	273.0	213.9	2,999.7
Mean daily sunshine hours	5.7	6.1	6.7	7.4	8.2	8.8	9.2	9.9	10.2	10.3	9.1	6.9	8.2
Source: NOAA

Climate data for Chitipa (1961–1990 normals)
Month	Jan	Feb	Mar	Apr	May	Jun	Jul	Aug	Sep	Oct	Nov	Dec	Year
Mean daily maximum °C (°F)	26.2 (79.2)	26.4 (79.5)	26.1 (79.0)	25.6 (78.1)	24.8 (76.6)	23.7 (74.7)	23.5 (74.3)	24.9 (76.8)	27.7 (81.9)	29.9 (85.8)	29.6 (85.3)	27.0 (80.6)	26.3 (79.3)
Daily mean °C (°F)	20.4 (68.7)	20.4 (68.7)	20.5 (68.9)	19.9 (67.8)	18.7 (65.7)	17.2 (63.0)	16.8 (62.2)	18.2 (64.8)	20.8 (69.4)	22.9 (73.2)	22.8 (73.0)	20.9 (69.6)	20.0 (68.0)
Mean daily minimum °C (°F)	17.1 (62.8)	17.1 (62.8)	17.2 (63.0)	16.9 (62.4)	15.1 (59.2)	12.9 (55.2)	12.5 (54.5)	13.7 (56.7)	15.9 (60.6)	17.7 (63.9)	18.3 (64.9)	17.6 (63.7)	16.0 (60.8)
Average precipitation mm (inches)	204.8 (8.06)	216.0 (8.50)	192.0 (7.56)	56.6 (2.23)	7.5 (0.30)	0.6 (0.02)	0.8 (0.03)	0.0 (0.0)	0.7 (0.03)	6.0 (0.24)	78.8 (3.10)	224.0 (8.82)	987.8 (38.89)
Average precipitation days (≥ 0.3 mm)	21	19	19	10	3	2	2	1	1	2	7	20	107
Average relative humidity (%)	83	84	84	82	77	73	70	63	55	57	61	79	72
Mean monthly sunshine hours	142.6	137.2	173.6	213.0	260.4	282.0	300.7	310.0	297.0	291.4	234.0	167.4	2,809.3
Mean daily sunshine hours	4.6	4.9	5.6	7.1	8.4	9.4	9.7	10.0	9.9	9.4	7.8	5.4	7.7
Source: NOAA

Climate data for Nkhata Bay, Malawi (1961–1990 normals)
Month	Jan	Feb	Mar	Apr	May	Jun	Jul	Aug	Sep	Oct	Nov	Dec	Year
Mean daily maximum °C (°F)	28.8 (83.8)	28.9 (84.0)	28.8 (83.8)	28.6 (83.5)	27.3 (81.1)	25.8 (78.4)	25.5 (77.9)	26.6 (79.9)	28.7 (83.7)	30.2 (86.4)	30.4 (86.7)	29.2 (84.6)	28.2 (82.8)
Daily mean °C (°F)	24.7 (76.5)	24.7 (76.5)	24.4 (75.9)	23.9 (75.0)	22.1 (71.8)	20.3 (68.5)	19.9 (67.8)	20.8 (69.4)	22.8 (73.0)	24.7 (76.5)	25.6 (78.1)	24.9 (76.8)	23.2 (73.8)
Mean daily minimum °C (°F)	21.1 (70.0)	21.1 (70.0)	20.8 (69.4)	20.0 (68.0)	17.9 (64.2)	15.7 (60.3)	15.2 (59.4)	15.6 (60.1)	17.4 (63.3)	19.8 (67.6)	21.2 (70.2)	21.3 (70.3)	18.9 (66.0)
Average precipitation mm (inches)	224.2 (8.83)	200.7 (7.90)	358.0 (14.09)	283.0 (11.14)	134.0 (5.28)	37.2 (1.46)	32.5 (1.28)	5.2 (0.20)	3.2 (0.13)	14.0 (0.55)	118.0 (4.65)	247.0 (9.72)	1,657 (65.24)
Average precipitation days (≥ 0.3 mm)	19	17	20	18	10	5	4	2	1	2	8	17	123
Average relative humidity (%)	84	84	85	84	81	78	75	72	69	68	75	81	78
Mean monthly sunshine hours	170.5	159.6	195.3	192.0	238.7	237.0	254.2	288.3	300.0	313.1	264.0	201.5	2,814.2
Mean daily sunshine hours	5.5	5.7	6.3	6.4	7.7	7.9	8.2	9.3	10.0	10.1	8.8	6.5	7.7
Source: NOAA

== Forests ==
=== Tree cover extent and loss ===
Global Forest Watch publishes annual estimates of tree cover loss and 2000 tree cover extent derived from time-series analysis of Landsat satellite imagery in the Global Forest Change dataset. In this framework, tree cover refers to vegetation taller than 5 m (including natural forests and tree plantations), and tree cover loss is defined as the complete removal of tree cover canopy for a given year, regardless of cause.

For Malawi, country statistics report cumulative tree cover loss of 264,310 ha (2,643.1 km^{2}) from 2001 to 2024 (about 17.4% of its 2000 tree cover area). For tree cover density greater than 30%, country statistics report a 2000 tree cover extent of 1,521,029 ha (15,210.29 km^{2}). The charts and table below display this data. In simple terms, the annual loss number is the area where tree cover disappeared in that year, and the extent number shows what remains of the 2000 tree cover baseline after subtracting cumulative loss. Forest regrowth is not included in the dataset.

Annual tree cover loss in Malawi, 2001–2024. View chart definition.
Tree cover extent in 2000 minus cumulative tree cover loss in Malawi, 2001–2024 (loss-only residual; does not account for gain). View chart definition.

Annual tree cover extent and loss
Year	Tree cover extent (km2) (Note: This residual measure does not include forest regrowth.)	Annual tree cover loss (km2)
2001	15,185.38	24.91
2002	15,143.42	41.96
2003	15,072.48	70.94
2004	15,015.24	57.24
2005	14,920.66	94.58
2006	14,865.16	55.50
2007	14,790.22	74.94
2008	14,692.93	97.29
2009	14,652.58	40.35
2010	14,612.67	39.91
2011	14,529.98	82.69
2012	14,408.24	121.74
2013	14,302.62	105.62
2014	14,116.68	185.94
2015	14,008.75	107.93
2016	13,873.45	135.30
2017	13,719.93	153.52
2018	13,564.74	155.19
2019	13,443.26	121.48
2020	13,282.57	160.69
2021	13,116.75	165.82
2022	12,967.91	148.84
2023	12,738.12	229.79
2024	12,567.19	170.93

=== REDD+ reference levels and monitoring ===
Under the UNFCCC REDD+ framework, Malawi has submitted two forest reference level (FRL) packages. On the UNFCCC REDD+ Web Platform, the 2020 submission is listed as having an assessed reference level, while a second submission is listed as under technical assessment; for both packages, the other Warsaw Framework elements - a national strategy, safeguards, and a national forest monitoring system - are listed as "not reported".

The first assessed FRL, technically assessed in 2021, was found to be subnational even though it had originally been intended as national. It covered reducing emissions from deforestation, reducing emissions from forest degradation, and enhancement of forest carbon stocks. For the 2017-2021 period of applicability, the technical assessment reported time-varying values rising from 4,500,682 to 5,824,511 t CO2 eq per year. The assessment states that the benchmark included above-ground biomass, below-ground biomass, deadwood, litter and soil organic carbon for deforestation, above-ground biomass only for forest degradation, and above-ground and below-ground biomass for enhancement of forest carbon stocks, while reporting CO2 only.

A second national FRL submission, published in 2024 and listed on the platform as under technical assessment, proposes a benchmark for 2021-2025 based on a 2010-2020 reference period. It again covers deforestation, forest degradation, and enhancement of forest carbon stocks, and proposes a constant net FRL of 1,491,041 t CO2 eq per year. The submission applies a forest definition of at least 1/2 hectare (6,000 yd^{2}), 10 percent crown closure, and trees capable of reaching 5 metres (16 ft) in height at maturity, and states that it used a national monitoring approach based on Collect Earth point sampling and plantation data. It includes above-ground biomass and below-ground biomass for all three activities, with deadwood, litter and soil organic carbon included for deforestation only, and reports CO2 only.

== Area ==
The total area of the country is 118,484 km^{2} (45,747 sq mi), but this includes 24,404 km^{2} (9,422 sq mi) of water surface, mainly composed of Lake Malawi, but there are other sizeable lakes, such as Lake Malombe, Lake Chilwa and Lake Chiuta. The land area is 94,080 km².

The country is dominated by Lake Malawi, which drains into the Zambezi River through the Shire River. As a result, the whole of the country, except for one eastern district, is part of the Zambezi drainage system. Lake Chiuta and the surrounding plain is drained by the Lugenda river, which is part of the Ruvuma River drainage system. Lake Chilwa, about 35 km (22 mi) south of Lake Chiuta, is unusual as it has no outlet although when it overflows it flows into Lake Chiuta through a swampy plain. High rates of evaporation ensure that the lake seldom fills up – much of the lake is only 1 metre deep or less.

Environment – current issues: Deforestation; land degradation; water pollution from agricultural runoff, sewage, industrial wastes; siltation of spawning grounds endangers fish populations

Environment – international agreements:
party to: Biodiversity, Climate Change, Climate Change-Kyoto Protocol, Desertification, Endangered Species, Environmental Modification, Hazardous Wastes, Marine Life Conservation, Ozone Layer Protection, Ship Pollution, Wetlands
signed, but not ratified: Law of the Sea

== Extreme points ==
This is a list of the extreme points of Malawi, the points that are farther north, south, east or west than any other location.

- Northernmost point – the tripoint with Tanzania and Zambia, Northern Region
- Easternmost point – unnamed location on the border with Mozambique immediately south-west of the Mozambican village of Buena-uzi, Southern Region
- Southernmost point – unnamed location on the border with Mozambique immediately north-east of the Mozambican village of Jossene, Southern Region
- Westernmost point – unnamed location on the border with Zambia, immediately east of the Zambian town of Chipata, Central Region

== See also ==
- List of ecoregions in Malawi
- List of islands of Malawi
