= Wildlife of Malawi =

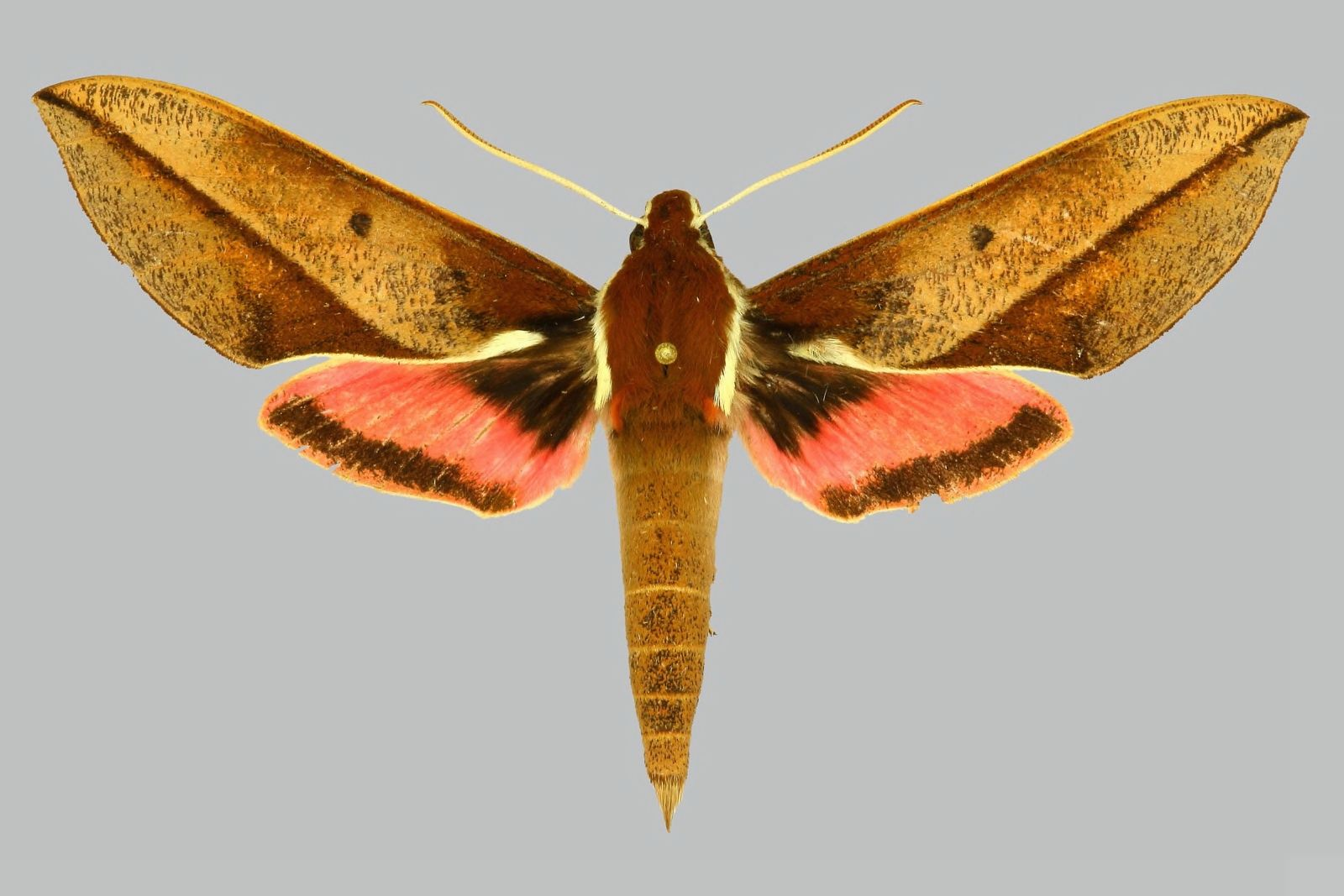
Chaerocina zomba, a moth endemic to Malawi

The wildlife of Malawi is composed of the flora and fauna of the country. Malawi is a landlocked country in southeastern Africa, with Lake Malawi taking up about a third of the country's area. It has around 187 species of mammal, some 648 species of birds have been recorded in the country and around 500 species of fish, many of them endemic, are found in its lakes and rivers. About 20% of the country has been set aside as national parks and game and forest reserves.

== Geography ==
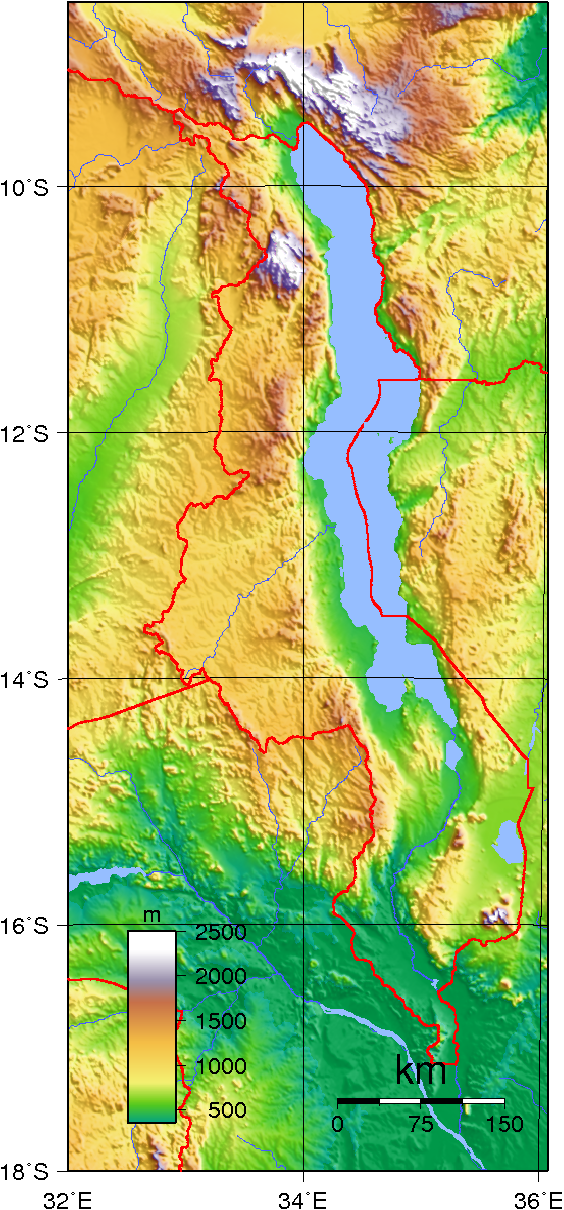
Topography of Malawi

The flora and fauna are much influenced by the geography of the region. Malawi is a land-locked country, dominated by the Great Rift Valley which has a north – south orientation, and is 860 km (534 mi) long and between 90 and 200 km (56 and 124 mi) wide. The main feature is Lake Malawi which forms much of the eastern boundary of the country. The lake is drained by the Shire River which flows southwards to join the lower Zambezi in neighbouring Mozambique. Lake Malawi is 460 m (1,500 ft) above sea level but is 700 m (2,300 ft) deep in places. It is bordered on the west by a narrow plain, above which the land rises steeply to form high plateaux, generally between 900 and 1,200 m (3,000 and 3,900 ft) above sea level. To the north, the Nyika Plateau rises to 2,600 m (8,500 ft). To the south lie the gently rolling Shire Highlands, and to the extreme south the land falls away towards the Zambezi floodplain. Lake Chilwa, the second biggest lake, is near the Mozambique border and has no outlet.

Malawi has a tropical continental climate which is somewhat influenced by the country's proximity to the sea. Temperatures rise from September until the beginning of the rainy season in November, after which the climate is warm and wet until April after which it becomes cooler and dry. The annual rainfall varies from 700 to 3,000 mm (28 to 118 in) in different parts of the country. Frosts can be experienced in the highest mountains in the north, and the temperature may reach 42 °C (108 °F) in Shire Valley in the south.

About 21% of Malawi has been set aside for the protection of its natural flora and fauna, as national parks, forest reserves and wildlife reserves. These include the Kasungu National Park, the Nyika National Park, the Lengwe National Park, the Liwonde National Park and the Lake Malawi National Park.

== Flora ==
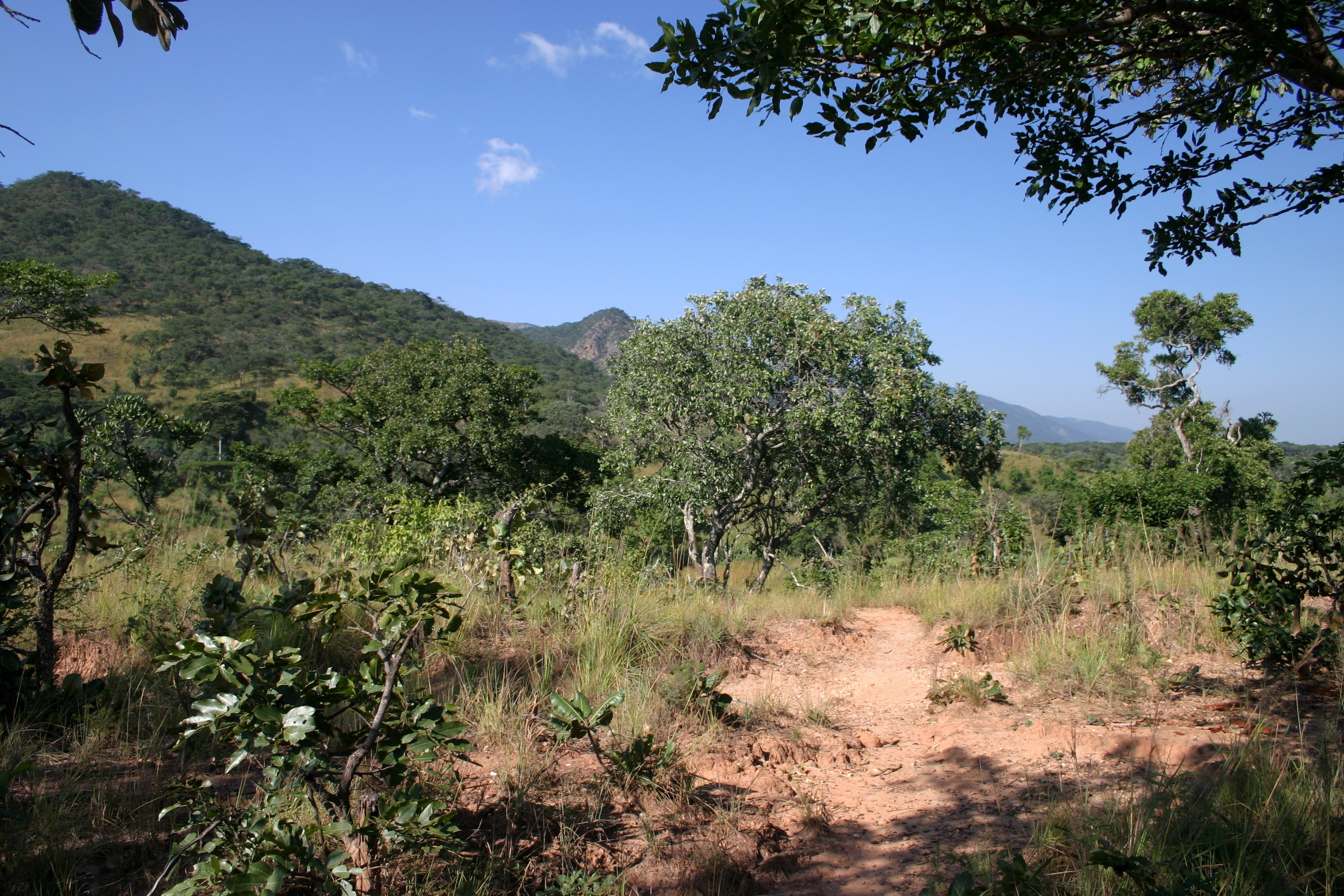
Miombo woodland in Nyika National Park

The western part of the country lies in the Southern Miombo woodlands ecoregion, characterised by tall trees with a lower storey of shrubs and grasses. The natural vegetation of much of the low- and mid-level areas of Malawi is a form of deciduous forest and shrubland known as Zambezian and mopane woodlands. Between 500 and 1,500 m (1,600 and 4,900 ft) this is mostly miombo woodland, dominated by Brachystegia trees which are often interspersed with Julbernardia and Isoberlinia trees.

Much of the forest has been cleared to make way for agricultural land. Mopane woodland, dominated by Colophospermum mopane, used to be abundant but only a few patches remain. Similarly, Acacia / Combretum woodland has largely been depleted, but larger areas of rainforest remain at mid to high altitudes, especially in the north of the country. The high plateaux are clad in low grasses, heathers and heaths, with many flowering plants blooming after the rainy season. Swamps are found in the Shire Valley and around Lake Chilwa. Wild date palms grow in some highland areas and near the Shire River, and raffia palms are found near upland streams and are common in the Nkhotakota Wildlife Reserve. Around four hundred species of orchid have been recorded in the country, 120 of them epiphytic. They are most abundant in Nyika National Park and growing on the surrounding mountainsides.

== Fauna ==
=== Mammals ===
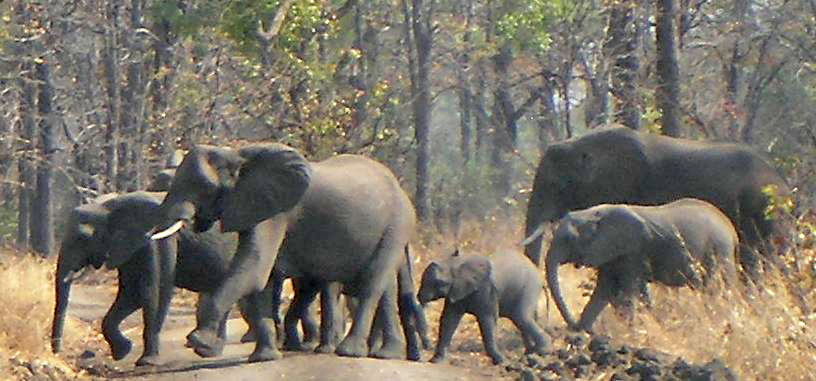
Elephants in Liwonde National Park

About 187 species of mammals have been recorded in Malawi. Of these, 55 are bats and 52 are rodents. The people living in rural Malawi are mostly subsistence farmers; they do not appreciate their crops being trampled and eaten and will hunt or drive off wild animals. Elephants, lions, leopards, African buffaloes, hippopotamuses and rhinoceroses are present in the country but their numbers are low except in national parks and game reserves. More numerous are jackals and spotted hyenas, African wildcats, caracal and serval. Smaller predators include mongooses, genets, civets, striped polecats, honey badgers, spotted-necked and African clawless otters.

Antelopes occurring in Malawi include the common eland, the greater kudu, the waterbuck, the sable and roan antelopes, the bushbuck, the nyala, the impala, the southern reedbuck and several smaller species of antelope. Primates present in the country include yellow and chacma baboons, vervet monkeys, blue monkeys, thick-tailed and lesser bushbabies.

=== Birds ===
Some 648 species of bird have been recorded in Malawi of which 456 are resident and another 94 are migratory within Africa, and some of these may breed in the country. Around 77 species are flying between eastern Asia and South Africa. Species of global concern which pass through in small numbers include the pallid harrier, lesser kestrel, corn crake and great snipe, as well as lesser flamingo and Malagasy pond heron. Lake Chilwa supports 160 species, some of which are resident.

Malawi is at the southern end of the range for many East African birds, and the northern limit for some South African species. Evergreen forest provides a particularly rich list of bird species, and the miombo woodland supports many species that are found nowhere else. The lakes and marshes are rich in species, with Lake Chilwa having a greater diversity of birds than Lake Malawi.

=== Fish ===
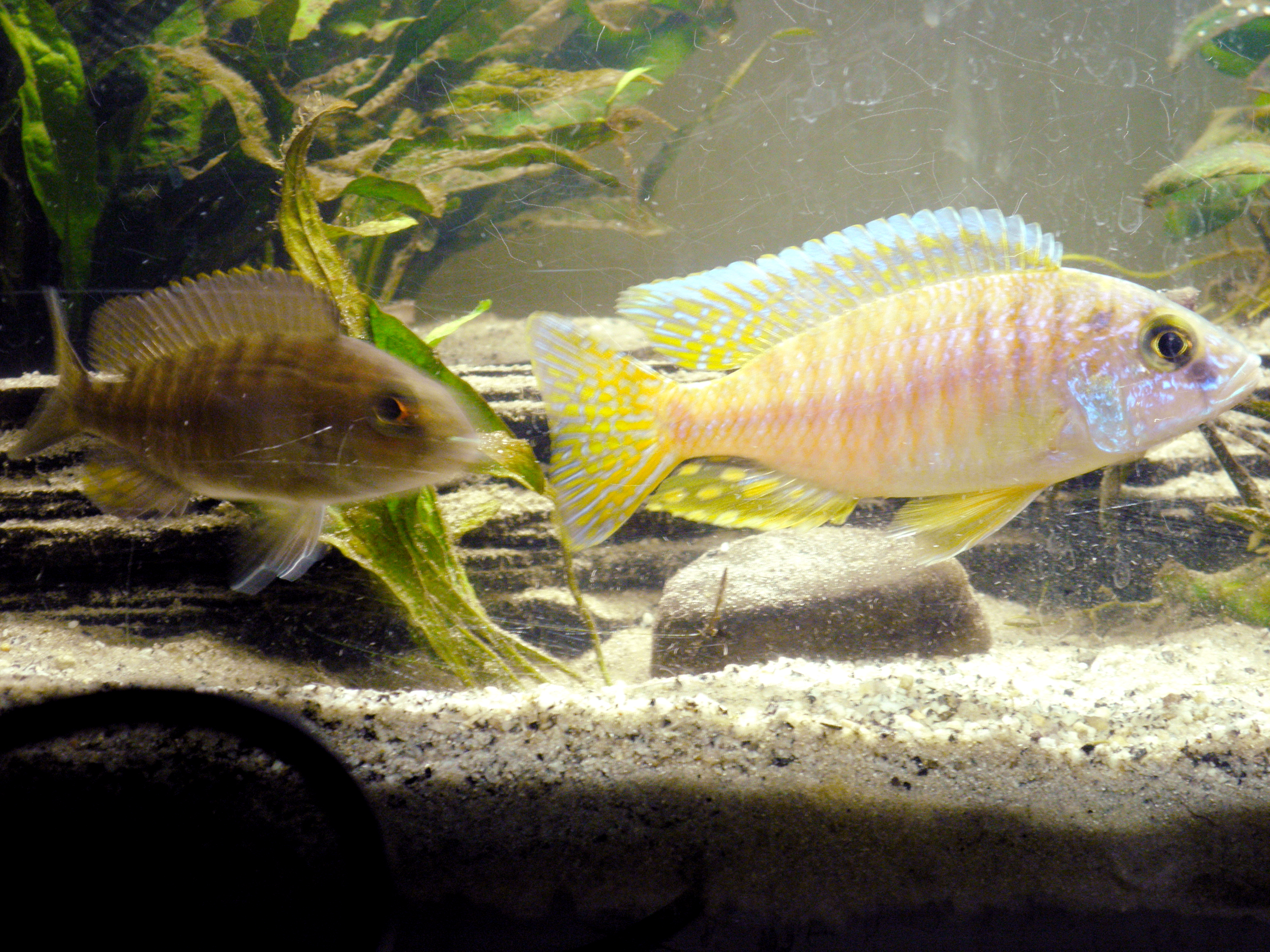
Night aulonocara, a vulnerable species, known from a single island in Lake Malawi

There are about five hundred species of fish in Malawi, with over 90% of them being endemic; this is a greater number of species than occur in Europe and North America in total. Along with Lake Tanganyika, Lake Malawi contains a larger number of endemic species than any other freshwater lake in the world. The majority of species present are cichlids, which are mouthbrooders, and many of these species are found in small localised areas of the lakes and nowhere else. Other fish are also present and are hunted as part of the local fishing industry. These include the African catfish, various species of carp, and a small sardine-like fish present in large shoals which are caught by trawling. The commonest fish in Lake Chilwa are Barbus paludinosus, Oreochromis shiranus chilwae, Clarias gariepinus, Brycinus imberi and Gnathonemus.

=== Insects ===
Insects are plentiful in Malawi, including large numbers of ants, beetles, crickets, flies, bees and wasps. There are probably thousands of species of butterfly and moth in the country, including butterflies in the families Satyridae, Nymphalidae, Papilionidae and Pieridae, and moths in the Noctuidae.

== See also ==
- Lepage, Denis. "Checklist of birds of Malawi". Bird Checklists of the World. Avibase. Archived from the original on 30 September 2007.
