= Tourism in Malawi =

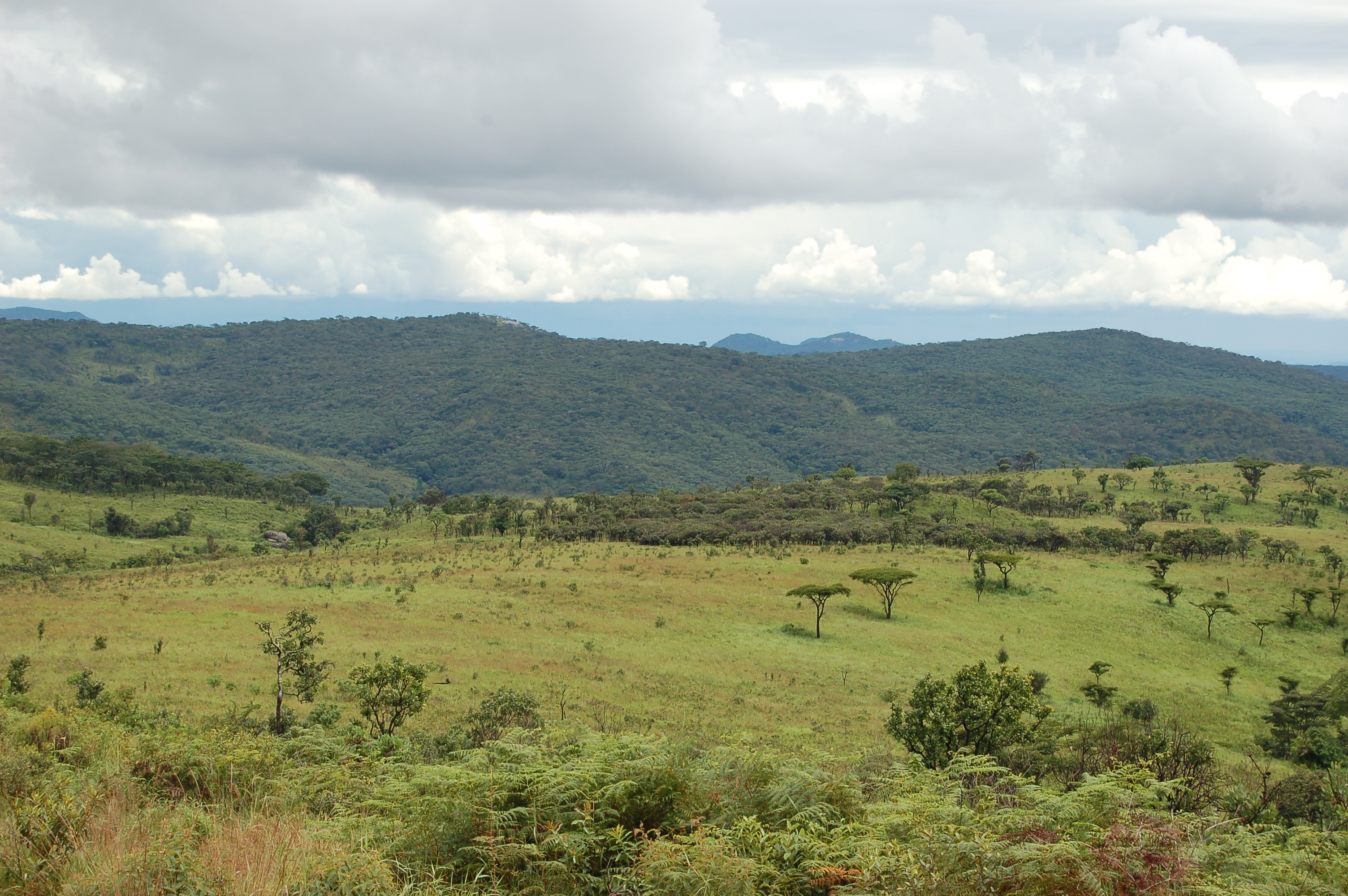
Nyika National Park

Malawi, officially known as the Republic of Malawi, is a country located in southeastern Africa. The country is also referred to as "The Warm Heart of Africa", due to the friendliness of the people.

Malawi has a variety of tourist attraction sites including Lake Malawi (29,600 km^{2}), several national parks, game reserves, and Mulanje Mountain. The tourism industry in Malawi has significantly grown since the mid-1970s, and the Malawian government is attempting to expand it further. The tourism industry was, however, significantly affected in the 1980s by an economic recession in South Africa—where most Malawian tourists come from. The sector was also greatly affected by the destabilisation of Zimbabwe but it has seen double-digit growth in recent years. Tourism contributed 4.5% to the national GDP in 2014 and provided 3.8% of all jobs.

== Governance ==
The Minister of Tourism Vera Kamtukele unveiled a revised Tourism Act 2025 in April. It created a Malawi Tourism Authority and the Malawi College of Tourism and it was said to be largest change since 1968. Tourism and transport account for over 5% of the country's Gross National Product.

== Main tourist attraction sites ==
Malawi has a range of popular tourist attractions, including Lake Malawi, Mulanje Mountain and Zomba Plateau. National parks are another common tourist destination. Notable sites include Nyika National Park, Kasungu National Park, and Liwonde National Park. Lake Malawi National Park is another significant destination, as it is listed as a UNESCO heritage site due to the unique species that inhabit the grounds.

In addition to these sites, the rock paintings at Chongoni are another commonly visited tourist destination. These sites provide an understanding of traditional culture in Malawi, depicting farmer rock art and BaTaw paintings, a group that inhabited the area from the Stone Age.

== Lake Malawi ==
Covering almost a fifth of the country, Lake Malawi is one of the defining natural features in the country. Lake Malawi spans from the Northern region of the country through the Southern region, with its northern part being the deepest. It is the world's eighth largest freshwater lake and Africa's third largest lake. Sometimes known as the Lake of Stars, Lake Malawi is the country's largest contributor to its tourism industry. Lake Malawi has a diverse ecology that includes native animals. The lake has clear water, allowing for the observation of cichlid fish. Some activities that take place on the lake are snorkeling, diving, kayaking and horse riding.

== Beaches ==
Malawi has a variety of beaches where tourists can visit. Some of the most notable beaches on the shores of Lake Malawi include Kande Beach and Chintheche Inn in Nkhata Bay. There are many lodges along the lake shore where tourists can also spend their time. Some of the accommodation facilities along the coasts of Lake Malawi include Makokola Retreat in Mangochi, Sunbird Livingstonia in Salima, and many more. While at the beaches along the coast of Lake Malawi, tourists can participate in various water sports including kayaking, parasailing, canoeing, snorkeling and water skiing or they could even go fishing.

== Lake of Stars Music Festival ==
The Lake of Star Music festival is an annual music concert that happens along the coasts of Lake Malawi. Lake of Stars is one of Africa's biggest music festivals that attracts at least 4000 local and international attendees as well as artists from countries within Africa and beyond. The annual event was founded by Will Jameson in 2004 and ever since, the event has gained recognition from CNN, The Mail & Guardian and The Independent. The live music event, which usually occurs in the fall, bridges the local and international tourists, and it is also a source of revenue in the tourism industry.

== National Parks ==
Malawi is home to several national parks with a lot of wildlife, such as the zebras at Nyika National Park and the elephants at Liwonde National Park. Lake Malawi National Park in the South is a UNESCO heritage site and it has over a thousand species of fish and birds that are just unique to the warm heart of Africa. Located at Cape Maclear, Lake Malawi National park is the only Malawian national park that was opened to protect the biodiversity of unique fish and other aquatic species that it inhabits.
