= White Malawians =

Malawian citizens of White European ancestry

Total population
- 2018 census: 13,693 (1.2% of Malawi's population)

Regions with significant populations
- Throughout Malawi, but mostly concentrated in urban areas. Population by regions, as of the 2018 census
- Southern Region: 5,673
- Central Region: 4,075
- Northern Region: 3,009

Languages
- English (90%)

Religion
- Christianity (97.2%), Irreligious (2.2%), Other (1.6%)

Related ethnic groups
- White Zimbabweans, White Namibians, Afrikaners, French Huguenots, Germans, Coloureds, British diaspora in Africa, South African diaspora, other White Africans

White Malawians are people of European descent who trace their ancestry to the early colonial era in Malawi. They are a small but significant minority group in Malawi, with a rich history and diverse experiences.

The history of White Malawians dates back to the 16th century when Portuguese explorers, including Gaspar Bocarro, arrived in the region. Later, British explorers like David Livingstone, John Speke, James Augustus Grant, and Verney Lovett Cameron also ventured into the area. During the colonial era, which began in 1883, European settlers, administrators, and missionaries arrived, establishing farms, businesses, and churches. They played a significant role in shaping the country's economy, politics, and culture.

== History ==
=== Origin ===
==== Early explorers ====
The first European to set eyes on Malawi was the Portuguese explorer, Gaspar Bocarro, in 1616. Other Portuguese traders and missionaries followed, but it wasn't until the arrival of David Livingstone in 1859 that the region gained significant European attention. Portuguese, British, and other European explorers and traders arrived in Malawi, interacting with local populations and establishing trade routes.

== Expeditions ==
=== Gaspar Bocarro ===
In 1616, the Portuguese trader Gaspar Bocarro journeyed through what is now Malawi, producing the first European account of the country and its people. During the Maravi Empire, the Chewa had access to the coast of modern-day Mozambique, and through this coastal area, the Chewa traded ivory, iron, and slaves with the Portuguese and Arabs. The Portuguese were also responsible for the introduction of maize to the region, which would eventually replace sorghum as the staple of the Malawian diet. Malawian tribes traded slaves with the Portuguese, which were sent mainly to work on Portuguese plantations in Mozambique or to Brazil. This marked the beginning of a long and complex history of slavery in the region. Bocarro's expedition marked the beginning of European contact with Malawi, which would eventually lead to colonization by the British in the late 19th century. His account of the country and its people provided valuable information for future explorers and traders, and helped to shape European perceptions of the region.

=== David Livingstone ===
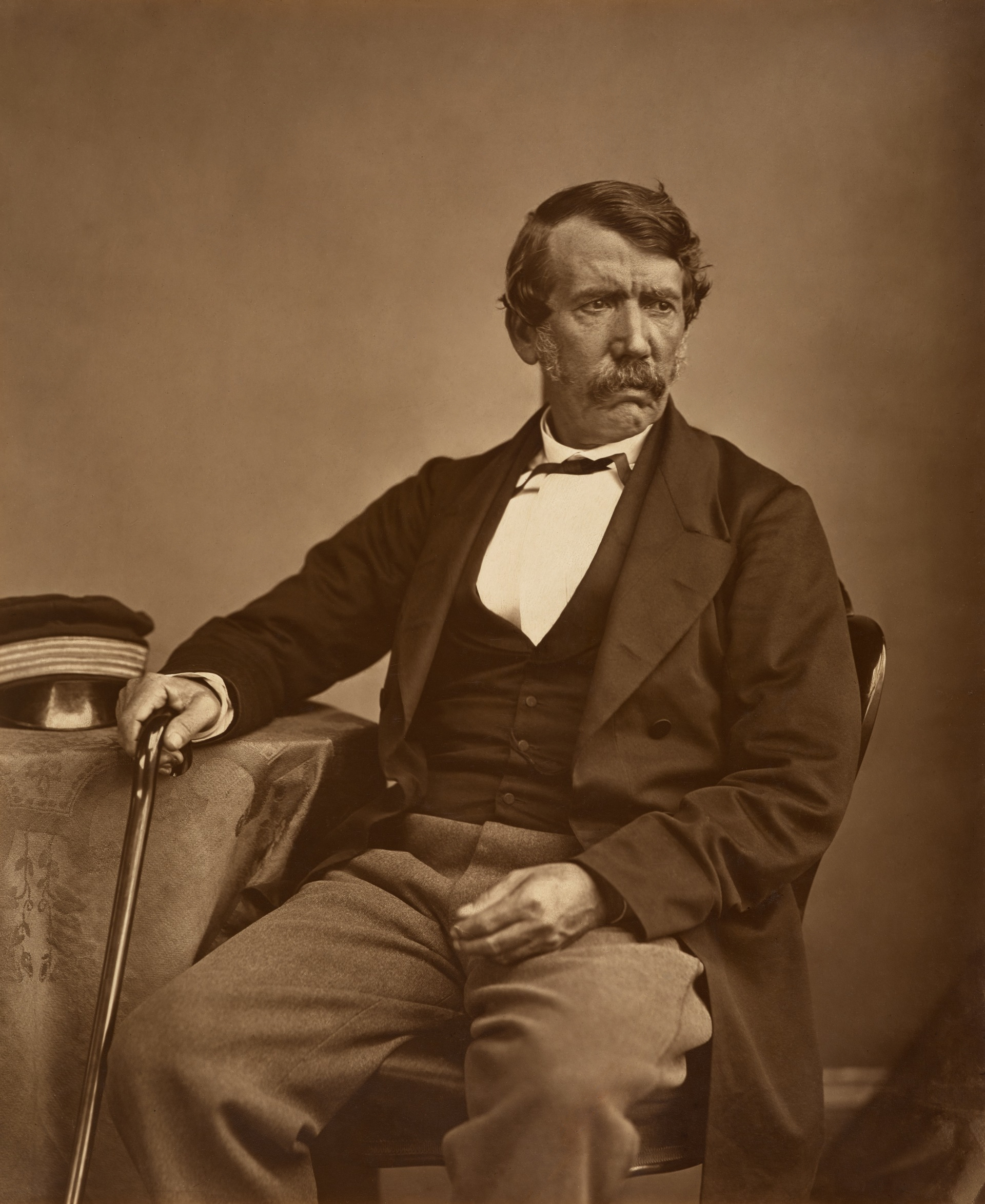
David Livingstone, the most famous explorer of Malawi history

David Livingstone's expedition to Malawi, then known as Nyasaland, was a significant event in the history of the region. In 1859, Livingstone, a Scottish missionary and explorer, led an expedition to the region with the goal of exploring the Zambezi River and spreading Christianity to the local population. Livingstone's expedition was motivated by a desire to open up the region to European influence and to abolish the slave trade, which was prevalent in the area at the time. He believed that by introducing European culture and religion, he could bring civilization and prosperity to the region. During his journey, Livingstone encountered various tribes, including the Chewa and the Nyanja, and learned about their customs and beliefs. He also discovered the Victoria Falls, which he named after the British monarch, and explored the surrounding area. Livingstone's expedition marked the beginning of European exploration of Malawi, and his writings about the region helped to raise awareness about its geography, culture, and natural resources. His legacy continued to shape the region's history, with many subsequent explorers and colonial powers building on his work. Livingstone's expedition also had a profound impact on the local population, as it introduced new ideas, technologies, and beliefs that would shape the region's development for centuries to come. Today, Livingstone is remembered as a pioneering figure in the history of Malawi, and his expedition is celebrated as a significant milestone in the country's development.

=== John Speke ===
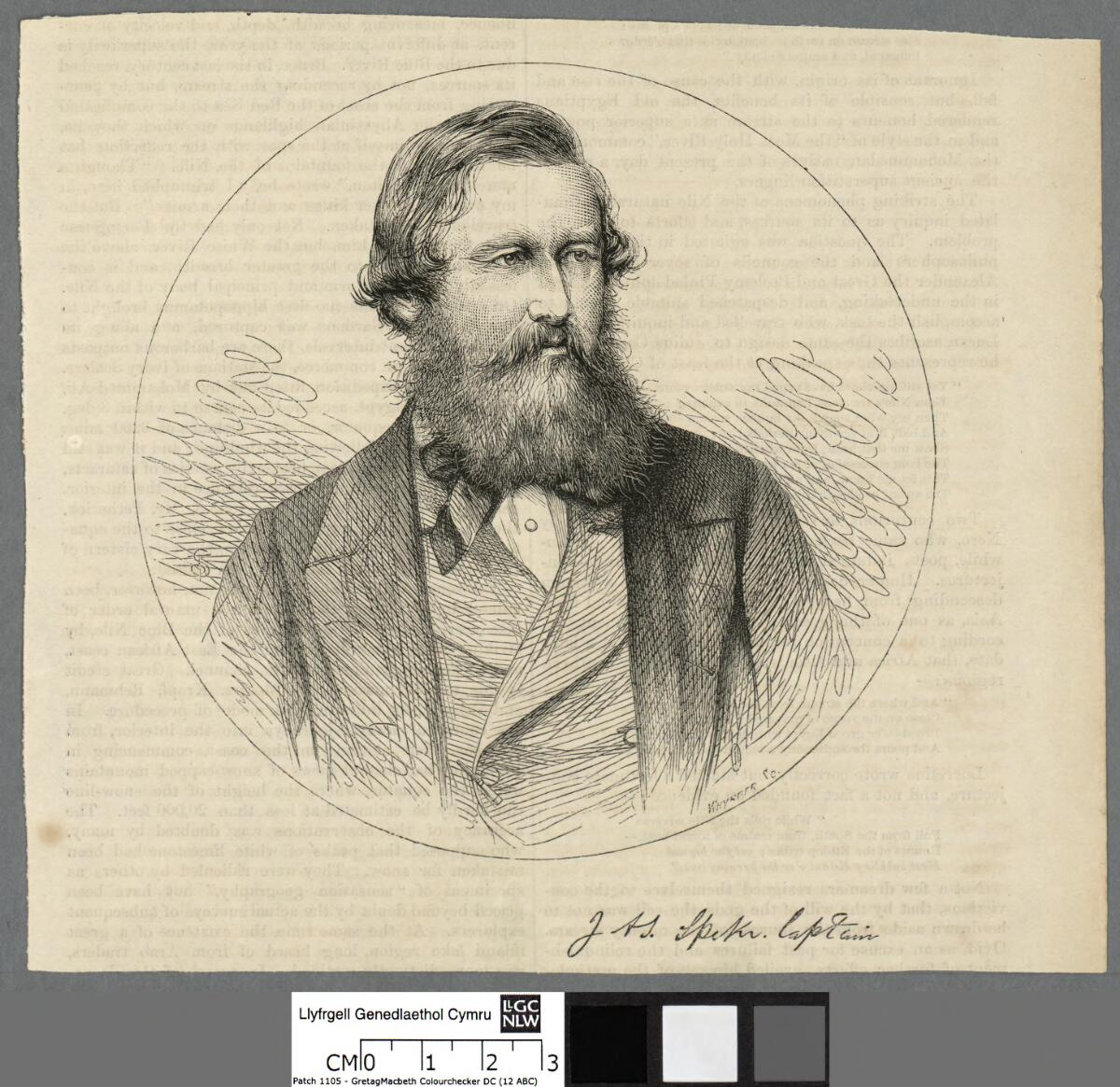
John Speke in 1858

John Speke's expedition to Malawi, then known as Nyasaland, was a significant event in the history of the region. In 1858, Speke, a British explorer and military officer, led an expedition to Lake Victoria, which is now known to be the source of the River Nile. During his journey, Speke became the first European to see Lake Victoria, which he renamed after the British monarch, Queen Victoria. He also explored the surrounding area and mapped the lake. Speke's expedition was marked by challenges, including tropical diseases and conflicts with local tribes. However, he was able to complete his mission and return to England, where he was welcomed as a hero. Speke's discovery of the source of the Nile was a significant achievement that helped to open up the region to further exploration and colonization. His expedition also marked the beginning of British interest in East Africa, which would eventually lead to the colonization of the region. Speke's legacy is still remembered today, and his discovery of the source of the Nile is considered one of the greatest achievements in the history of exploration.

=== James Augustus Grant ===
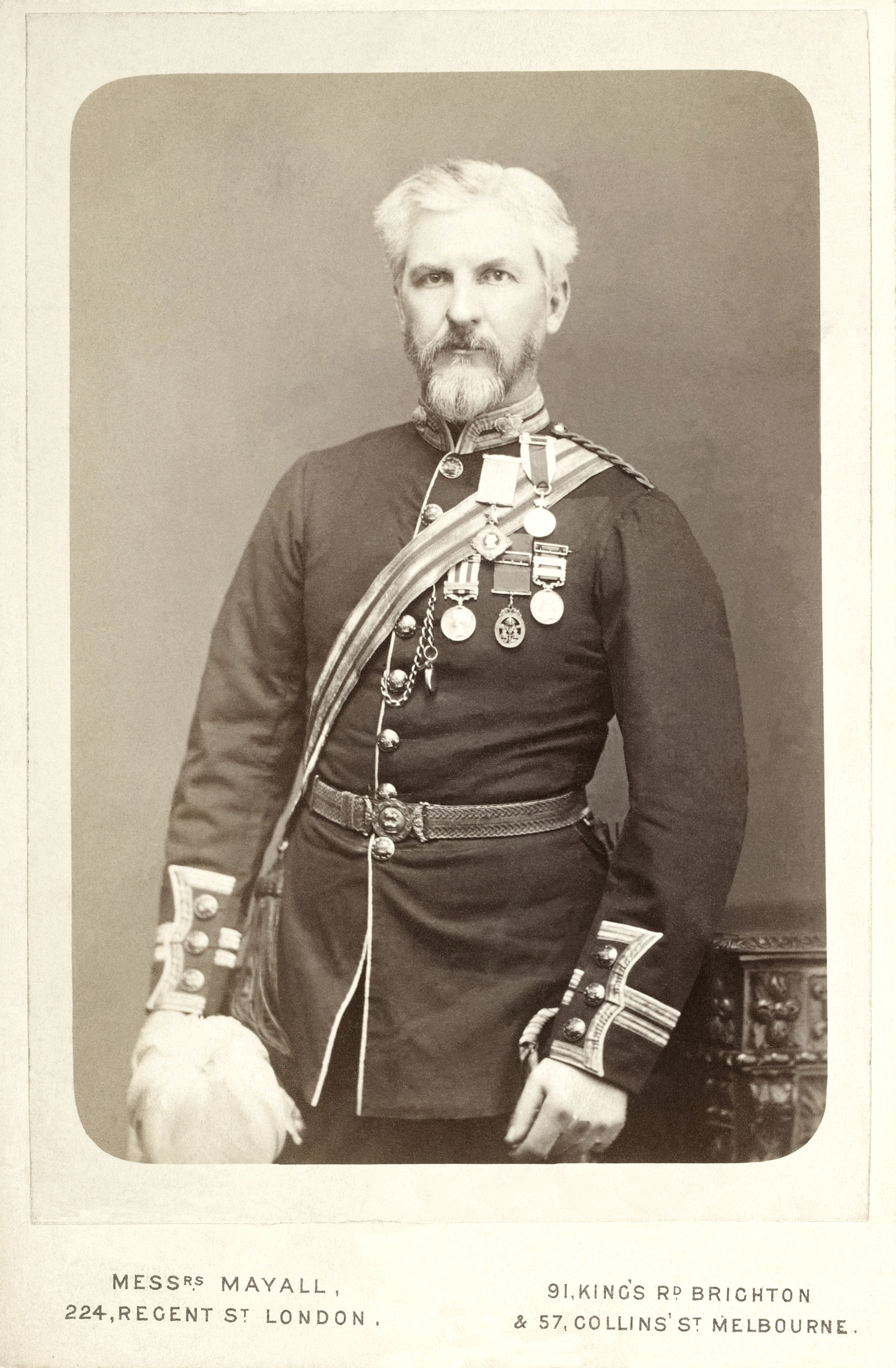
James Augustus Grant (1827-1892), scottish explorer of the eastern equatorial Africa

James Augustus Grant was the Scottish explorer and soldier who led an expedition to East Africa in 1860. His journey took him through present-day Malawi, then known as Nyasaland. The expedition was funded by the British Government and the Royal Geographical Society. Grant's team started in Zanzibar and proceeded to Lake Malawi, also known as Lake Nyasa. They eventually reached the western shores of the lake in present-day Malawi. The purpose of the expedition was to explore the region, map the lake and its surroundings, and gather information on the local population, geography, and natural resources. Grant faced numerous challenges during his journey, including harsh terrain, tropical diseases, and encounters with hostile local tribes. Despite these challenges, Grant successfully mapped a significant portion of Lake Malawi and its surrounding areas, providing valuable information on the region's geography and natural resources. His expedition contributed significantly to the understanding of East Africa's geography and paved the way for future explorers and colonial powers in the region. Grant's expedition achieved several notable milestones. He mapped the southern end of Lake Malawi and discovered the river that flows out of the lake, now known as the Shire River. He also documented the existence of the Murchison Falls, now known as Victoria Falls. Additionally, Grant collected valuable data on the region's geology, botany, and zoology, and established friendly relations with some local tribes, gathering information on their cultures and traditions.

=== Verney Lovett Cameron ===
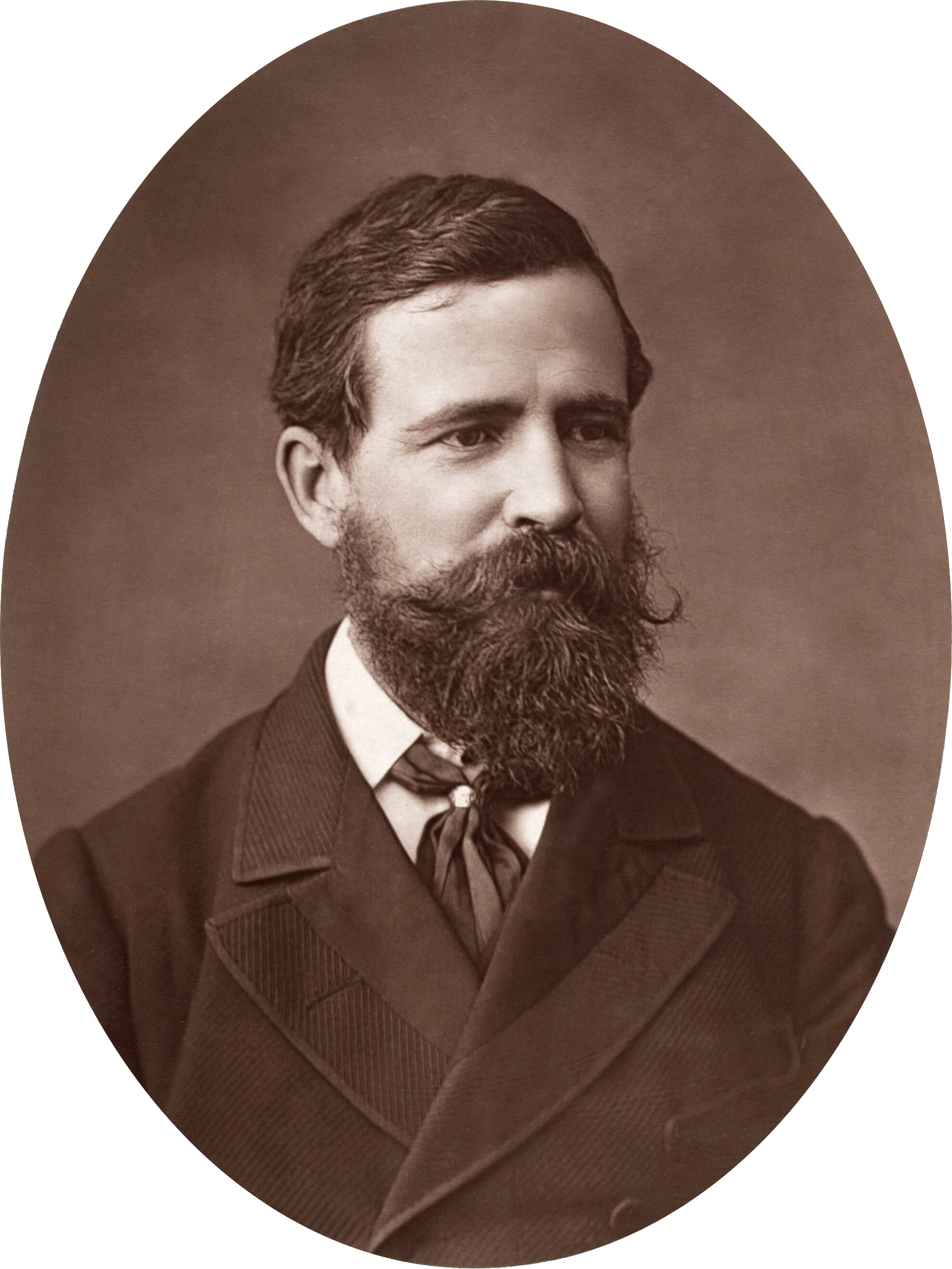
Verney Lovett Cameron between 1870-1889

Verney Lovett Cameron was the first European to cross equatorial Africa from sea to sea. He was born in 1844, the son of an English clergyman, and joined the British Navy around the age of 13. He saw an active service in the Mediterranean, East Africa, the Gulf of Mexico, and the East Indies. His experience in the African continent inspired his determination to aid in the suppression of the slave trade. In 1873, Cameron led an expedition to assist David Livingstone, who was living in present-day Tanzania. When Cameron arrived, he learned of Livingstone's death and met his faithful servants, Chuma and Susi, who were taking his body back to England. Cameron collected Livingstone's books and papers and continued his journey, surveying Lake Tanganyika and following the Lukuga River. He finally arrived at Catumbela, on the coast of present-day Angola, two years and nine months later, in November 1875.

Cameron spent his life promoting commercial development in Africa. He teamed up with Sir Richard Francis Burton to explore the gold-producing district of Africa's Gold Coast and wrote several books about his adventures, including "Across Africa" and "To the Gold Coast for Gold". He was killed in a horseback riding incident in 1894.

These expeditions laid the foundation for British colonial rule in Malawi, which began in 1883. The expeditions not only explored the region's geography but also introduced European culture, religion, and technology to the local population. They also led to the establishment of missions, farms, and businesses, which had a lasting impact on the country's development. Today, the legacy of these expeditions can still be seen in Malawi's cultural heritage, economy, and political landscape.. These expeditions helped map the region, establish trade routes, and introduce Christianity. Livingstone's expeditions aimed to abolish the slave trade and introduce Christianity to the region.

=== Colonial era (1883-1964) ===
In 1883, the British established the British Central Africa Protectorate, which later became Nyasaland in 1907. During this period, many British colonizers, administrators, and missionaries settled in Malawi, establishing farms, businesses, and churches.

== Influence ==
White Malawians played a significant role in shaping the country's economy, politics, and culture. They introduced new crops, farming techniques, and infrastructure development, which contributed to the country's economic growth. Many also contributed to the development of education and healthcare systems in Malawi.

== Post-colonial era ==
After Malawi gained independence in 1964, many White Malawians chose to remain in the country, with some playing important roles in the new government. However, under President Hastings Banda's rule, many White Malawians faced persecution and were forced to leave the country. Today, White Malawians continue to make significant contributions to the country's development, particularly in the fields of agriculture, tourism, conservation and politics.

== Life expectancy ==
Average life expectancy at birth for White Malawians is around 70–75 years, higher than the national average due to better access to healthcare and living standards.

== Historical population ==
Estimates suggest around 10,000-20,000 White Malawians lived in the country during the colonial era. By the 1970s, the population had decreased to around 5,000-7,000 due to emigration and political unrest. Today, estimates suggest around 12,000-15,000 White Malawians remain in the country. Most White Malawians reside in urban areas, particularly in Lilongwe, Mzuzu and Blantyre.

=== Migrations ===
Many White Malawians have migrated to other countries, including South Africa, the UK, Australia, the US, and other nations. South Africa has been a popular destination due to historical and cultural ties, with many settling in cities like Johannesburg and Cape Town. The UK has also attracted many White Malawians, with settlements in cities such as London and Manchester.

Australia has been another popular destination, with White Malawians seeking better economic opportunities and a warmer climate, settling in cities such as Sydney and Perth. Some have also migrated to the US, particularly to states like California, Texas, and New York. Additionally, White Malawians have migrated to other countries, including Canada, New Zealand, and European nations like Portugal and the Netherlands.

The reasons for migration vary. Many White Malawians left the country during the political turmoil of the 1960s and 1970s. Others migrated in search of better economic opportunities, as Malawi's economy struggled in the post-colonial era. Family ties have also played a role, with many White Malawians having family connections in other countries, leading to migration for reunification or to join established communities. Education has also been a factor, with some White Malawians migrating for access to better schools and universities abroad.

The impact of migration has been significant. The migration of skilled White Malawians has contributed to a brain drain, depriving the country of talented individuals. However, migration has also facilitated cultural exchange between Malawi and other countries, with White Malawians contributing to diverse communities abroad. Remittances from White Malawians abroad have also contributed to Malawi's economy, supporting families and businesses back home.

== Statistics ==
According to the 2018 Malawi Population and Housing Census, White Malawians make up about 1.2% of the population. Most reside in urban areas, with 70-80% living in cities like Lilongwe, Blantyre, Zomba, and Mzuzu. The median age is around 50–60 years, with a balanced gender ratio. English is the predominant language spoken, followed by Chichewa and other local languages.

== Distribution ==
White Malawians are scattered throughout the country, with concentrations in urban areas and farming communities. Many reside in the central and southern regions, and less in the northern region, where they have established farms and businesses.

== Politics ==
During the colonial era, White Malawians held significant political power and influence. After independence, some White Malawians continued to play important roles in government and politics, but their influence declined over time. Today, some White Malawians remain involved in politics, but their numbers are limited.

== Demographics ==
=== Age structure ===
The age structure of White Malawians is skewed towards an older population, with a median age of 50–60 years. The youth population is relatively small. The gender ratio is balanced, and the language spoken is predominantly English, followed by Chichewa, Chitumbuka, among other local languages. Christianity is the main religion practiced, followed by other religions and beliefs.

=== Gender ratio ===
The gender ratio is relatively balanced, with a slight majority of females.

=== Language ===
Most White Malawians speak English, with a small number speaking Chichewa and Chitumbuka, among other local languages.

== Notable white Malawians ==
Several White Malawians have made significant contributions to the country's history and development. These include explorers like David Livingstone and John Speke, missionaries like Alexander Livingstone and Lady Mary Livingstone, and farmers and businessmen.

== See also ==
- History of the Jews in Malawi
