= Mumbo Island =

Island within Lake Malawi National Park

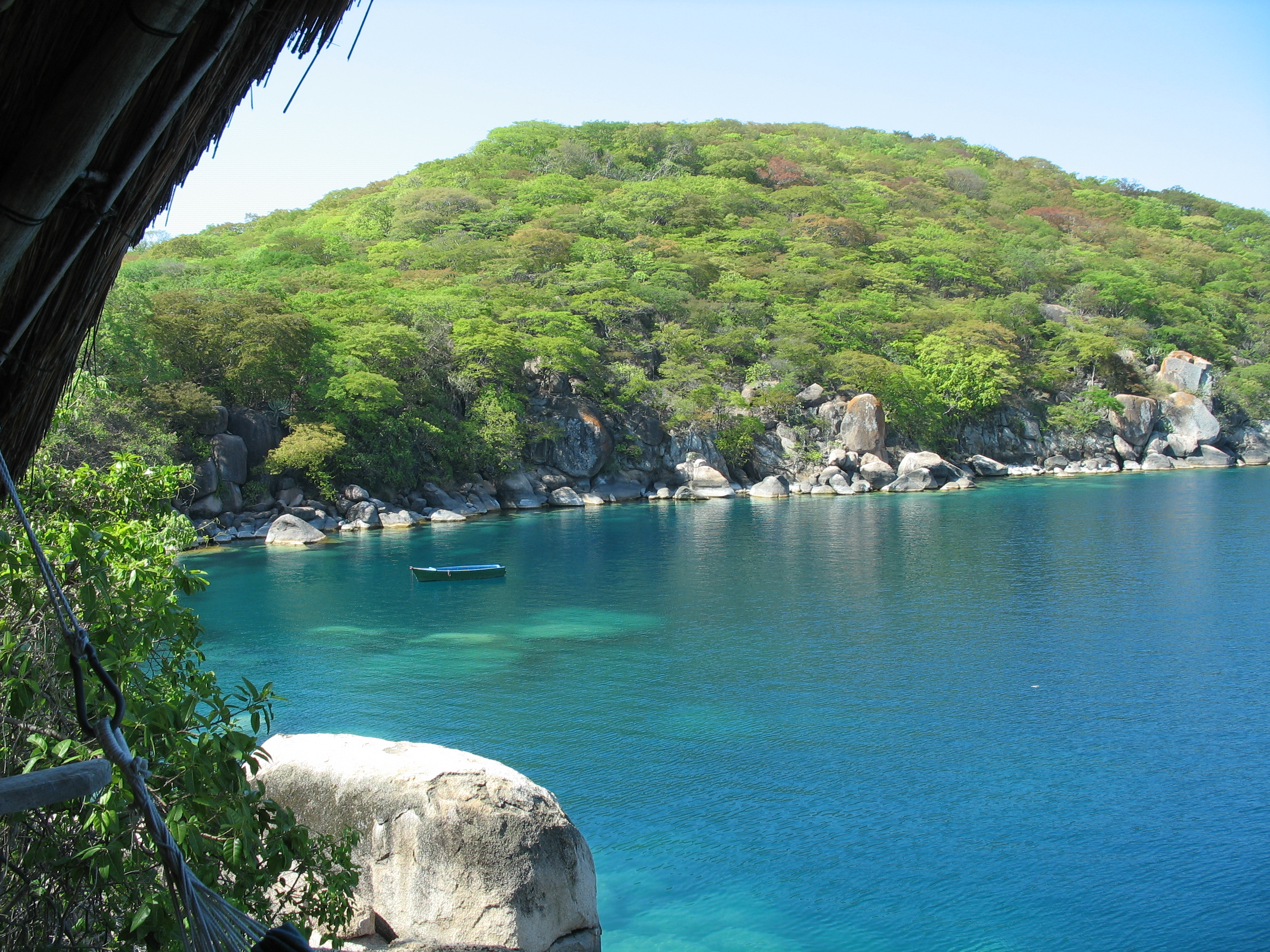
- South-Eastern shore of the island as seen from the southernmost peninsula

- Location within Malawi

Geography
- Location: Lake Malawi
- Coordinates: 13.98921°S 34.75543°E
- Total islands: 1
- Area: 514 m^{2} (5,530 sq ft)

Administration
- Malawi
- Region: Central Region
- District: Salima

Mumbo Island is an island within Lake Malawi National Park, located in the Salima District of the Central Region, some 100 kilometers (62 miles) east of the capital Lilongwe. It has no permanent settlement but is home to Mumbo Camp, an ecoboutique camp (i.e. an ecotourism boutique hotel).

== Wildlife ==
The island is home to African fish eagles, monitor lizards, African clawless otters and a number of species of cichlid.
