= Liwonde National Park =

National park in Malawi

- Location within Malawi
- Location: Malawi
- Coordinates: 14°50′S 35°20′E
- Area: 548 km^{2} (212 sq mi)
- Established: 1973

Liwonde National Park, also known as Liwonde Wildlife Reserve, is a national park in southern Malawi, near the Mozambique border. The park was established in 1973, and has been managed by the nonprofit conservation organization African Parks since August 2015. African Parks built an electric fence around the perimeter of the park to help mitigate human-wildlife conflict. In early 2018, the adjacent Mangochi Forest Reserve was also brought under African Parks' management, almost doubling the size of the protected area.

== Description and geography ==
Liwonde National Park is in the Southern Region of Malawi, just south of Lake Malawi, near the Mozambique border. It lies largely within the Machinga District, but also is in the Mangochi District. The Balaka District lies along its western border. The reserve covers 548 square kilometres (212 sq mi) of woodlands and dry savannah. A 30 km section of the Shire River runs through the park including a section of the shore of Lake Malombe, 20 km south of Lake Malawi . A section was added in 1977 on the northern edge of the park which connects it with Mangochi Forest Reserve.

Liwonde National Park, and the contiguous Mangochi Forest Reserve, are managed by African Parks in collaboration with local communities represented by the Upper Shire Association for the Conservation of Liwonde National Park (USACOL) and 31 Village Natural Resources Committees surrounding Liwonde. Liwonde has a 129-kilometre (80 mi) perimeter, which was unfenced until the nonprofit organization African Parks confirmed plans to construct a fully fenced border in 2015, which has since been completed. The Mangochi Forest Reserve forms part of a proposed ecoregion, to be called the South East Africa Montane Archipelago (SEAMA).

== History ==
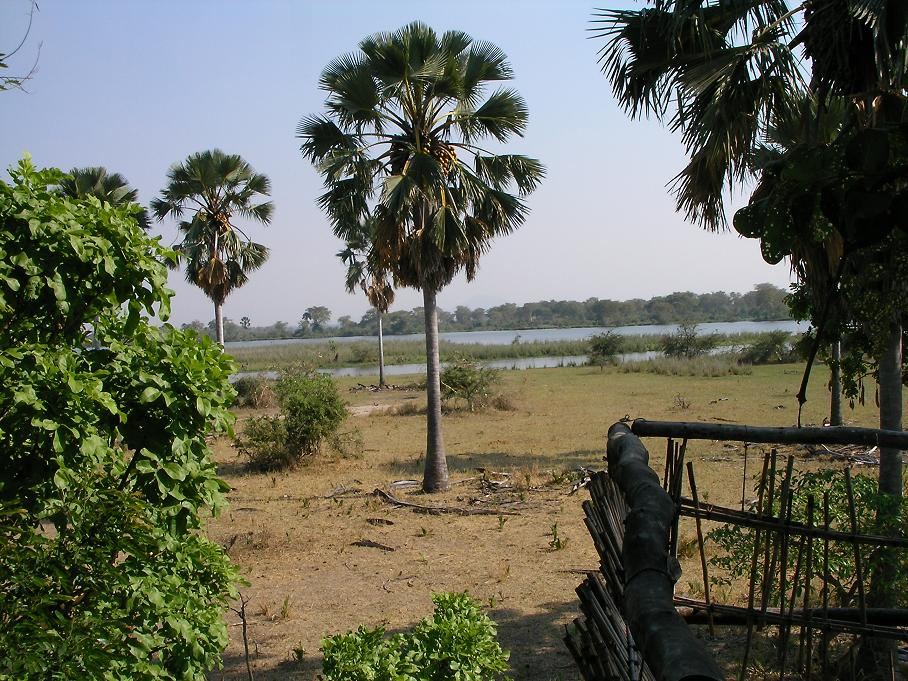
View of the Shire River, which constitutes the park's western border, in 2008

Liwonde was established in 1973. When the park was gazetted, many inhabitants were forced to relocate to border communities outside the park, which has resulted in villages in the periphery of the park having relatively high population density compared to the rest of the country. Before the park was created, the land was used for agriculture, largely subsistence. Cotton, maize, tobacco, and rice were the main crops and fishing was another important industry.

African Parks took over management of Liwonde in August 2015, after being enlisted by Malawi's Department of National Parks and Wildlife (DNPW). Rebuilding the park's fence was a top priority for the organization, in order to reduce human–wildlife conflict by keeping animals within Liwonde's boundaries and to reduce poaching. This fence is monitored 24/7 to ensure that animals stay in and poachers stay out. Fencing the park cost US$1.6 million and took approximately 18 months to complete.

In 2015, USACOL contributed K8.3 million from the United Nations Development Programme for the park's conservation. The project, which reportedly lasted from April to December, was managed by USACOL and CBNRM, both of which are part of the Coordination Union for the Rehabilitation of the Environment. According to CBNRM's national coordinator, the project encouraged local communities to "participate in the conservation and management of natural resources".

== Fauna ==
Liwonde has a population of approximately 17,800 large mammals, and hosts more than 380 bird species. Large mammals include African buffalo, antelope (including Common eland, the endangered sable antelope, and waterbuck), baboons, black rhinoceros, bushbuck, elephants, hippopotamus, impala, kudu, monkeys, and warthogs. The park is home to dozens of other grazing mammal species, as well as crocodiles.

Liwonde has been very active in conservation efforts and animal relocation programs. Since 1990, elephants, black rhinoceros, elands, impalas, kudu, sables, warthogs, waterbuck, and zebra have been relocated to or from the park. In 2020, an aerial survey estimated there were approximately 600 elephants, 1,300 buffalo, 1,000 sable, 6,600 waterbuck, and 2,500 hippopotamus.

=== Elephants ===
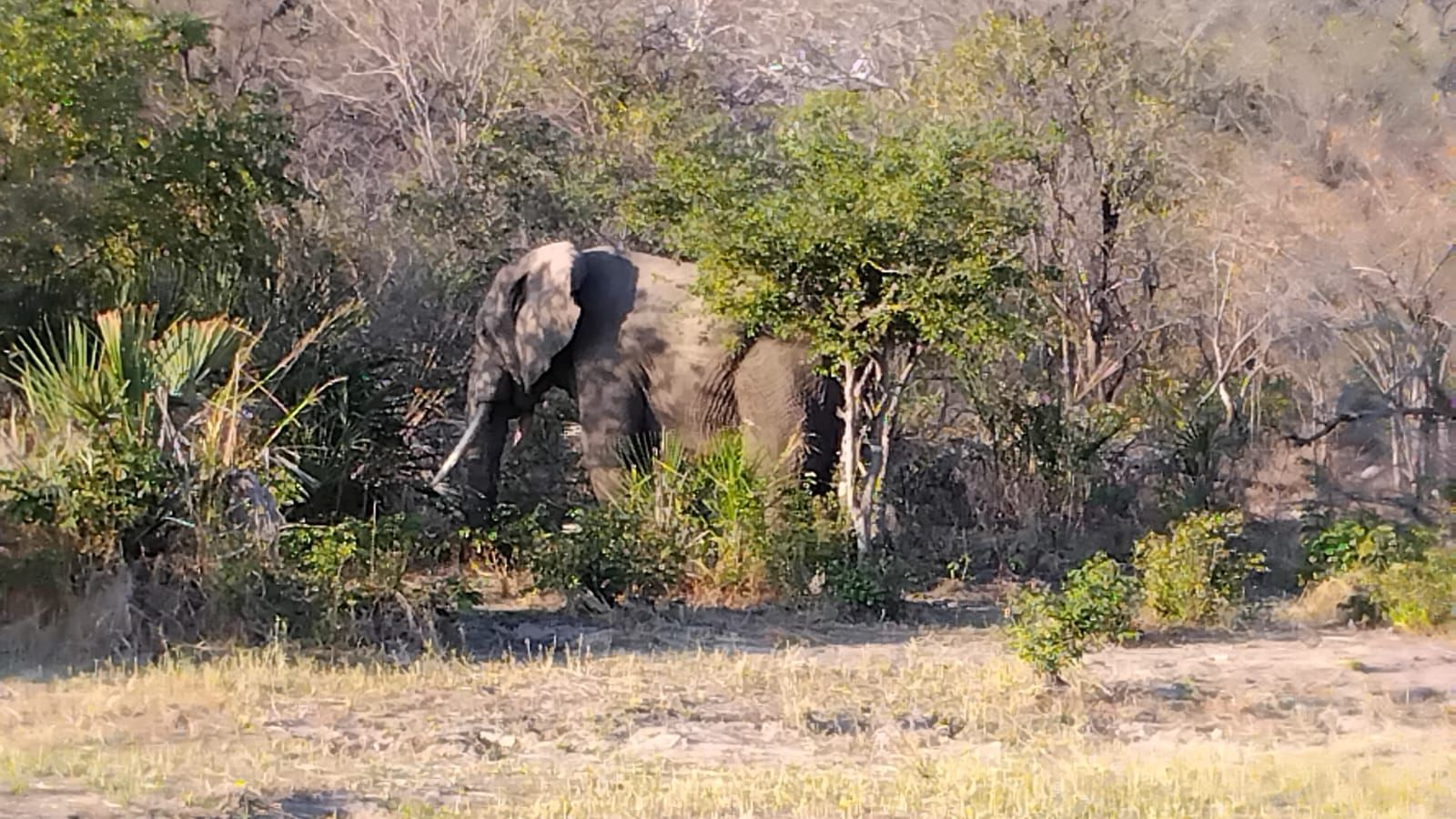
As seen by Beath High School in 2025

The park is known for elephant viewing and conservation efforts. African Parks helped park officials relocate 70 elephants from Liwonde and Mangochi to Majete Wildlife Reserve in 2008. During June–August 2016 and 2017, African Parks relocated approximately 500 elephants from Liwonde and Majete to Nkhotakota Wildlife Reserve, and a further 34 elephants from Liwonde to Nyika National Park. The $1.6 million project was funded by Nationale Postcode Loterij and the Wyss Foundation, among other donors. Another relocation occurred in July 2022, when 250 elephants were moved to Kasungu National Park.

=== Black rhinoceros ===
In 1993, a pair of black rhinoceros were moved from South Africa into a 15-square-kilometre (5.8 sq mi) fenced sanctuary within the park, a project funded by J&B London and J&B Circle of Malawi (now called the Endangered Species of Malawi). The first calf was born to the pair in 1996 and a second pair was introduced into a second sanctuary in 1998. In 1999, a second calf was born. The Liwonde Rhino Sanctuaries led to the growth of a number of other species, particularly buffalo, eland, Lichtenstein's hartebeest, roan antelope, zebra, and sable antelope, allowing for animals of those species to be moved to other parks, particularly Kasungu National Park. The fence surrounding these two sanctuaries was removed in 2000, opening the rest of the park to these and other animals which were living in the sanctuaries, and the rhinoceros conservation effort within the park continues.

In November 2019, 17 black rhinos were transported from South Africa to the park. The translocation was carried out by African Parks, in conjunction with WWF South Africa, the DNPW, and Ezemvelo KZN Wildlife.

=== Predators ===
In May 2017, African Parks relocated seven cheetahs from South Africa, becoming Malawi's first wild cheetahs in twenty years. These were the first large predators to be reintroduced to the park, after being absent from this part of the country for around a century. Endangered Wildlife Trust's Cheetah Metapopulation Project and DNPW assisted with the relocation. Since 2017, the cheetah population has increased to 21 individuals.

Liwonde park officials had hoped to introduce female lions in 2012. The last reported sighting of a male lion was in 2015. Park officials still planned to reintroduce lions and leopards, as of 2017. In early 2018, African Parks reintroduced 9 lions into Liwonde. The DNPW, the Dutch Government, and the Lion Recovery Fund assisted with the relocation. The lion population has since adjusted well, and the first cub was born in 2020.

In an effort to boost the park's hyena numbers, six individuals were reintroduced from a private property in Kasungu, bringing the population to about 25.

In July 2020, a pack of eight African wild dogs was reintroduced in the park, following decades since their local extinction. The pack adapted well to its new environment; and six weeks after their relocation, the first litter of pups was confirmed to be born. Tragically, in November 2022, all members of the pack were killed due to the intentional poisoning of a waterhole within the park itself.

=== Birds ===
Biome-restricted bird species in the park include: white-starred robin, brown-headed parrot, brown-breasted barbet, pale batis, Dickinson's kestrel, Lilian's lovebird, Böhm's bee-eater, racket-tailed roller, pale-billed hornbill, Kurrichane thrush, Arnot's chat, white-bellied sunbird, black-eared seedeater, broad-tailed paradise whydah, Meves's starling. The park is the only location in Malawi where Lilian's lovebird and the brown-breasted barbet are found. According to African Parks, there are at least six different species of vultures in Liwonde, four of which are critically endangered.

In 2011, Birdlife International and the Good Gifts Catalogue raised funds to survey and monitor the threatened Lilian's lovebird. Park rangers and local students worked with the Wildlife and Environmental Society of Malawi to research Lilian's lovebirds in 2012. There have been repeated requests to allow birds in the park to be captured for trade, especially Lilian's lovebird, but these have thus far been denied.

== Human–wildlife conflict ==
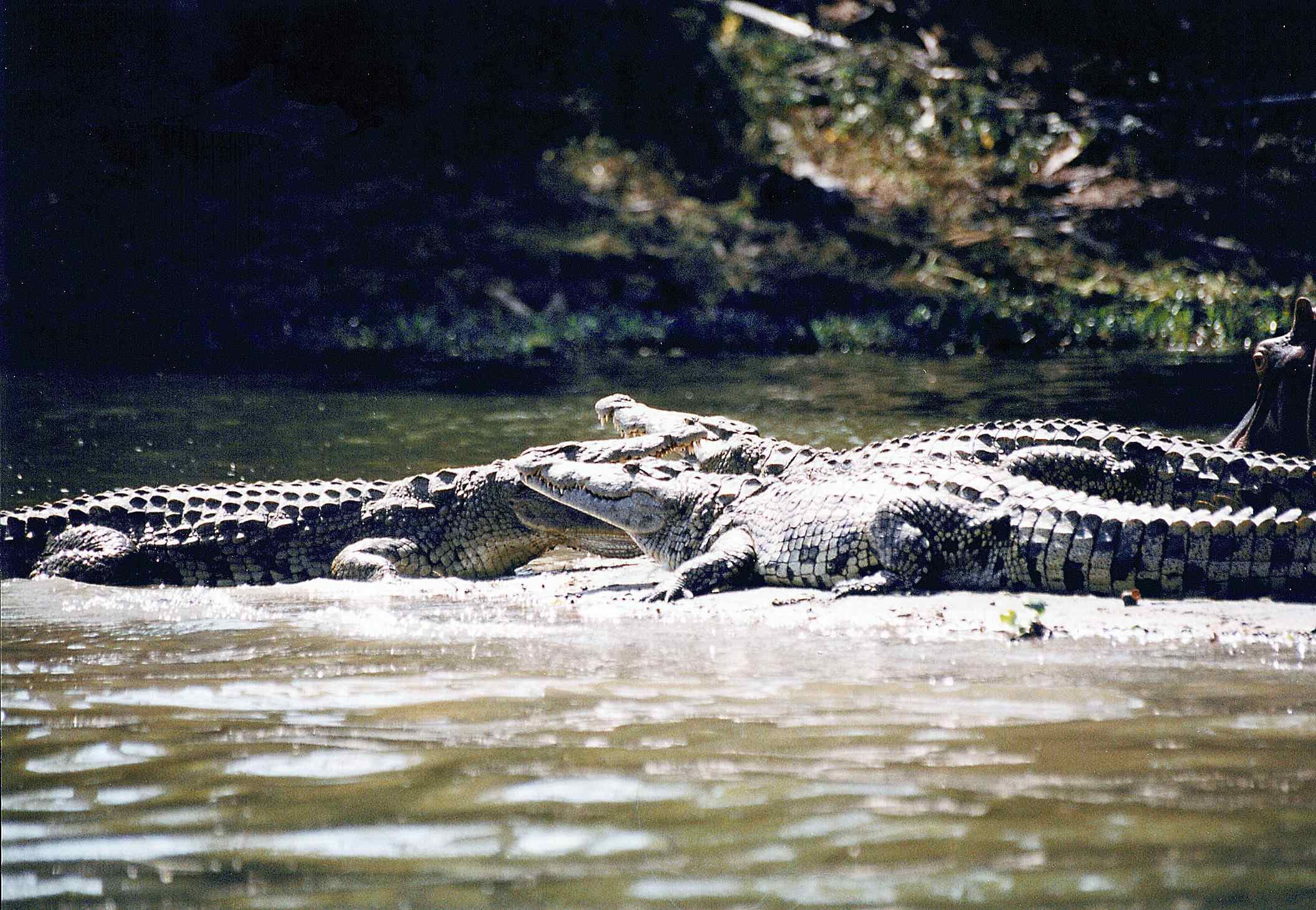
Crocodiles in the park in 2007

Interactions between people and wild animals in and around the park has resulted in significant human–wildlife conflict, particularly with elephants.

In 2015, poachers killed at least two elephants, and a rhinoceros calf had to be saved from a wire snare trap. Park officials have used an aircraft to steer elephants back into the park from neighboring areas, and patrol the park's waters by boat to reduce illegal fishing. In September 2015, park officials confirmed the deaths of three poachers inside, and four people outside the park as the result of crocodile and elephant attacks. The incidents occurred within seven weeks of one another. African Parks' chief executive officer called the attacks "almost unprecedented", but also said conflicts between animals and people were one reason the Malawi government invited the organization to manage the park. Since African Parks assumed management of the park in 2015, incidences of human-wildlife conflict have greatly reduced.

Fifty elephants and two rhinoceros in Liwonde were killed by poachers between 2014 and 2017, and rangers recovered between 18,000 and 23,000 snares in the park from 2015 to 2017. African Parks has made over 100 arrests and installed 120 km of electric fencing in an effort to reduce conflict and poaching.

== Flora ==
Mopane is the most common large plant species in the park. The epiphytic orchid, Microcoelia ornithocephala is nearly endemic to the park, also being recorded on nearby Sambani Hill. Other plants in the park include: acacias, miombo, Albizia harveyi, Adansonia digitata, reedbeds along the rivers, evergreen forests fringing tributaries, Acacia xanthophloea (fever tree), Borassus (Palmyra palm), capers, Hyphaene coriacea (lala palm), and Kigelia (sausage trees).

== Economy ==
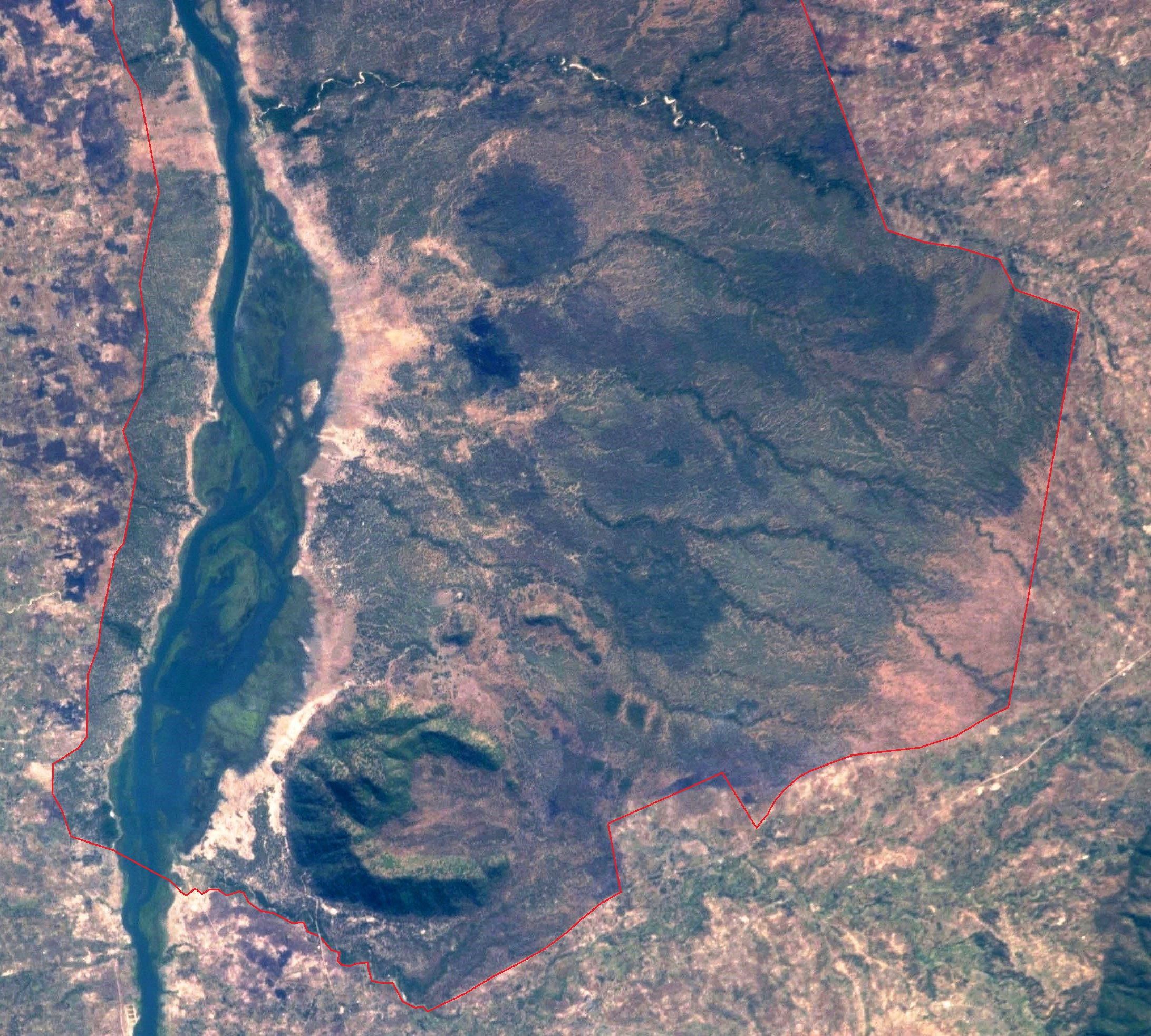
The southern section of the park, seen from space

Tourism makes up approximately 97% of the total revenue generated by the park, with 58% of that coming from concession fees from the private lodges in the park. The nearest township to the park is Liwonde, and there is mixed evidence that the economic benefits of the park have a great impact beyond the park boundaries. The park has many characteristics of an enclave resort, but there are small enterprises such as Makanga Women's Group and Njobvu Cultural Village Lodge which market goods and services to park tourists. Before the building of a fence, people living near the park argued in support of its construction, saying that the animals were damaging their crops. Proposals have been made by the Malawi Minister of Finance for revenue generated by the park to be divided between the park and local communities, although implementation was delayed.

=== Tourism ===
There are three lodges within the boundaries of Liwonde National Park; Chimwala Bush Camp, Kutengo Camp, and Mvuu Lodge. Chimwala Bush Camp is owned and managed by African Parks and is perched against Chinguni Hill. The camp features classic safari tents, private verandahs, outdoor bathrooms, and stunning views of the Shire river. Mvuu Lodge ("mvuu" means "hippopotamus" in Chewa), located on the banks of the Shire River. The lodge, established in 1995, is operated by Central Africa Wilderness Safaris, a company known for its sustainable practices and willingness to support local communities and conservation efforts. Mvuu Lodge has a sister property called Mvuu Camp. Boat safaris provide guests with opportunities to view wildlife. The lodge and camp has 56 beds as well as camp sites.

== Conservation partnerships ==
African Bat Conservation conducted research in Liwonde in 2014 and worked with the park on the National Bat Monitoring Programme, which evaluates the diversity and size of bat populations, until 2016. Carnivore Research Malawi worked with the park to evaluate carnivore density and distribution, particularly for the spotted hyena population, until 2016.

In 2021, the Lilongwe Wildlife Trust assumed responsibility for the monitoring of a number of species in Liwonde National Park on behalf of African Parks. Their programme focuses on the reintroduced carnivores, plus a range of ecologically and nationally important species. Lilongwe Wildlife Trust also run a research volunteer placement programme in Liwonde National Park focussing on iconic species such as lion, cheetahs, and hyena.
