= International rankings of Malawi =

These are the international rankings of Malawi.

== International rankings ==
Organization	Survey	Ranking
Institute for Economics and Peace	Global Peace Index	47 out of 144
United Nations Development Programme	Human Development Index	160 out of 182
Transparency International	Corruption Perceptions Index	89 out of 180
World Economic Forum	Global Competitiveness Report	119 out of 133
World Intellectual Property Organization	Global Innovation Index - 2026	126 out of 139
