= History of the Jews in Malawi =

The history of the Jews in Malawi formerly known as Nyasaland, and part of the former Federation of Rhodesia and Nyasaland (Rhodesia and Nyasaland).

== Background ==
Malawi was once part of the Maravi Empire. In colonial times, the territory was ruled by the British, under whose control it was known first as the British Central Africa Protectorate (1889–1907) and later Nyasaland (1907–1964). It became part of the Federation of Rhodesia and Nyasaland (1953–1963). The country achieved full independence, as Malawi, in 1964. After independence, Malawi was ruled as a one-party state until 1994.

== Jews in Nyasaland ==
=== Haven during the Holocaust ===
Press reports of the time state that during World War II (1939–1945), 60 Polish-Jewish families went to Nyasaland, then under British colonial rule and today known as modern day Malawi, arriving via Iran to escape the Holocaust. After the war, however, most of these Polish Jews left the area. By 1959, only twelve Jews were living in Malawi. In 1941 as German forces neared Cyprus 270 Jews were subsequently shipped to Nyasaland and Tanganyika by the British. An eyewitness report states that "a hundred" Jewish refugees from Cyprus were shipped via Palestine to Nyasaland during World War II.

== Rhodesia and Nyasaland ==
=== Sir Roy Welensky ===
The most notable person with partial Jewish parentage to serve in a high position was Sir Roy Welensky (1907–1991). He was a Northern Rhodesian (now Zambia) politician and the second and last prime minister (1956–1963) of the Federation of Rhodesia and Nyasaland. Born in Southern Rhodesia (now Zimbabwe) to an Afrikaner mother and a Lithuanian Jewish father, he moved to Northern Rhodesia. His father, Michael Welensky (b. c. 1843), was of Lithuanian Jewish origin, hailing from a village near Wilno (today Vilnius); a trader in Russia and horse-smuggler during the Franco-Prussian War, he settled in Southern Rhodesia after first emigrating to the United States, where he was a saloon-keeper, and then South Africa. His mother, Leah (born Aletta Ferreira; c. 1865–1918), was a ninth-generation Afrikaner of Dutch ancestry. His parents, for whom Raphael or "Roy" was the 13th child, kept a "poor white" boarding house.

== Malawi ==
=== Israel–Malawi relations ===
Malawi and Israel established diplomatic relations with each other in July 1964 and have since continued. Malawi under prime minister Hastings Banda's (1898–1997) foreign policy was one of only three Sub-Saharan African countries (the others being Lesotho and Swaziland (since 2018 renamed to Eswatini)) that continued to maintain full diplomatic relations with Israel after the Yom Kippur War in 1973. Israel has assisted Malawi with a few social and economic development programs. Post Banda Israel continues a relationship with Malawi on a non-residential basis.

== See also ==
- History of the Jews in Africa

=== Regions: ===
- History of the Jews in Central Africa
- History of the Jews in East Africa
- History of the Jews in North Africa
- History of the Jews in Southern Africa
- History of the Jews in West Africa

=== Topics: ===
- Religion in Malawi
