= Public holidays in Malawi =

This is a list of public holidays in Malawi.

Where the relevant event falls on a non-working day, the holiday is on the next working day.

Holiday	Date	Comments
New Year's Day	1 January	
John Chilembwe Day	15 January	Honours the Reverend Chilembwe who led the first nationalist uprising in 1914-1915 protesting against forced labour and African involvement in World War I.
Martyrs' Day	3 March	Honours the political heroes who gave their lives in the struggle against British colonialism.
Good Friday	Friday before Easter	
Easter Monday	Monday after Easter	
Labour Day	1 May	International Workers' Day
President Kamuzu Banda's Birthday	14 May	Malawi's first president
Eid al-Fitr	1 Shawwal (subject to moon sighting)	End of Ramadan
Independence Day	6 July	Marks Malawi's independence from the United Kingdom in 1964.
Mother's Day	15 October	This holiday is celebrated on World Rural Women's Day.
Christmas Day	25 December	
Boxing Day	26 December	
