= List of islands of Malawi =

This is a list of islands of Malawi.

== Lake Malawi ==
- Chizumulu Island
- Likoma Island

== Lake Chilwa ==
- Chilwa Island - inhabited
- Tongwe Island - inhabited

== Lake Malombe ==
- 2 Unnamed islands and several rocks at 14°32′15.6″S 35°16′10.4″E at northern end of lake.
