= List of ecoregions in Malawi =

The following is a list of ecoregions in Malawi, as identified by the Worldwide Fund for Nature (WWF).

== Terrestrial ecoregions ==
by major habitat type

=== Tropical and subtropical moist broadleaf forests ===
- Southern Zanzibar-Inhambane coastal forest mosaic

=== Tropical and subtropical grasslands, savannas, and shrublands ===
- Central Zambezian miombo woodlands
- Eastern miombo woodlands
- Southern miombo woodlands
- Zambezian and mopane woodlands

=== Montane grasslands and shrublands ===
- South Malawi montane forest-grassland mosaic
- Southern Rift montane forest-grassland mosaic

=== Flooded grasslands and savannas ===
- Zambezian flooded grasslands

== Freshwater ecoregions ==
by bioregion

=== Great Lakes ===
- Lake Malawi

=== Eastern and Coastal ===
- Lakes Chilwa and Chiuta

=== Zambezi ===
- Zambezi
  - Mulanje
  - Lower Zambezi
