= Kasungu National Park =

National park in Malawi

- IUCN category II (national park)
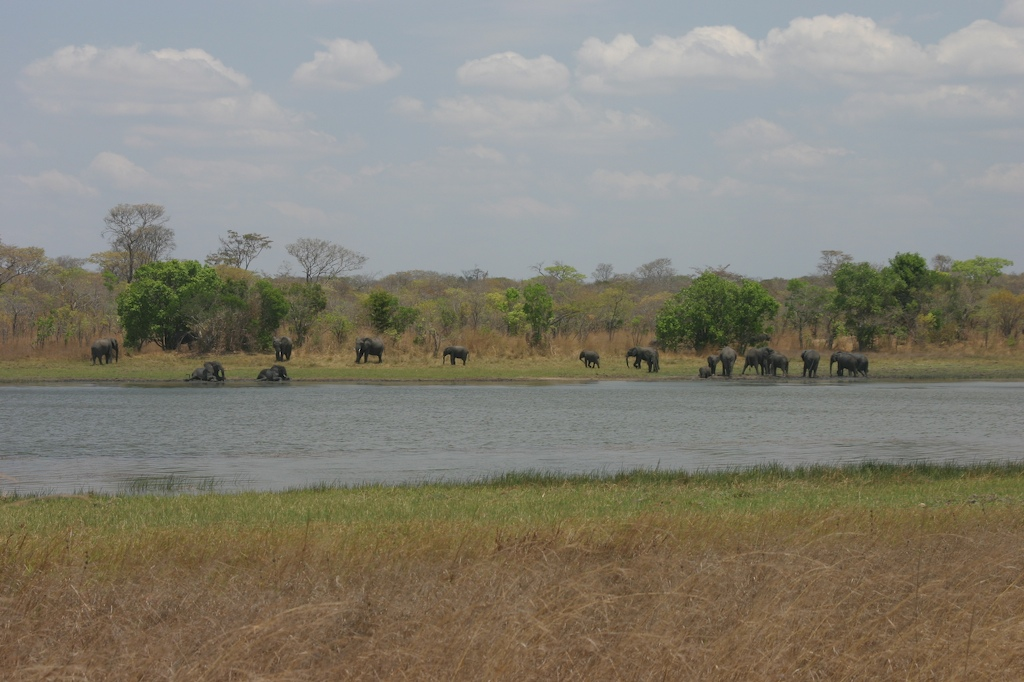
- Elephants at Lifupa Dam in Kasungu National Park

- Location within Malawi
- Location: Malawi
- Coordinates: 13°0′S 33°10′E
- Area: 2,316 km^{2} (894 sq mi)
- Established: 1970

Kasungu National Park is a national park in Malawi. It is located west of Kasungu, about 175 km north of Lilongwe, extending along the Zambian border.

Kasungu National Park, established in 1970, is the second-largest in Malawi at 2,316 square kilometres (894 sq mi), with an elevation of approximately 1,000 metres (3,300 ft) above sea level on average. It is located in the Central Region approximately 165 km (103 mi) north of Lilongwe.

Most years the park is closed during March, during the wet season. The park is warm from the months of September to May and cooler from June to August. During the summer months a large variety of birds migrate to the park and bird watching is common between June and September.

== Flora and fauna ==
The vegetation consists mainly of Miombo woodland with grassy river channels, known locally as Dambos. A number of rivers flow through the park, notably the Dwangwa and the Lingadzi and its tributary, the Lifupa, which creates an important spot for hippo surveyal in the park at the Lifupa Lodge. Kasungu is known for its population of elephants although is threatened by poaching. In July 2022, the International Fund for Animal Welfare moved on an additional 263 elephants. Ten people were said to have been killed be elephants in addition to crop damage. A British legal was acting to gain compensation for the people affected in the 167 villages that surround the park.

Other animals native to the park include Sable antelopes, roan antelopes, kudus, impala and hartebeest and plains zebra and African Buffaloes. Predators in Kasungu National Park include, hyenas, Cape wild dogs and servals. The South African cheetah was thought to be extinct in the late 1970s.

Since 2005, the protected area is considered a Lion Conservation Unit.
