= South Malawi montane forest–grassland mosaic =

Ecoregion in Malawi

South Malawi montane forest-grassland mosaic
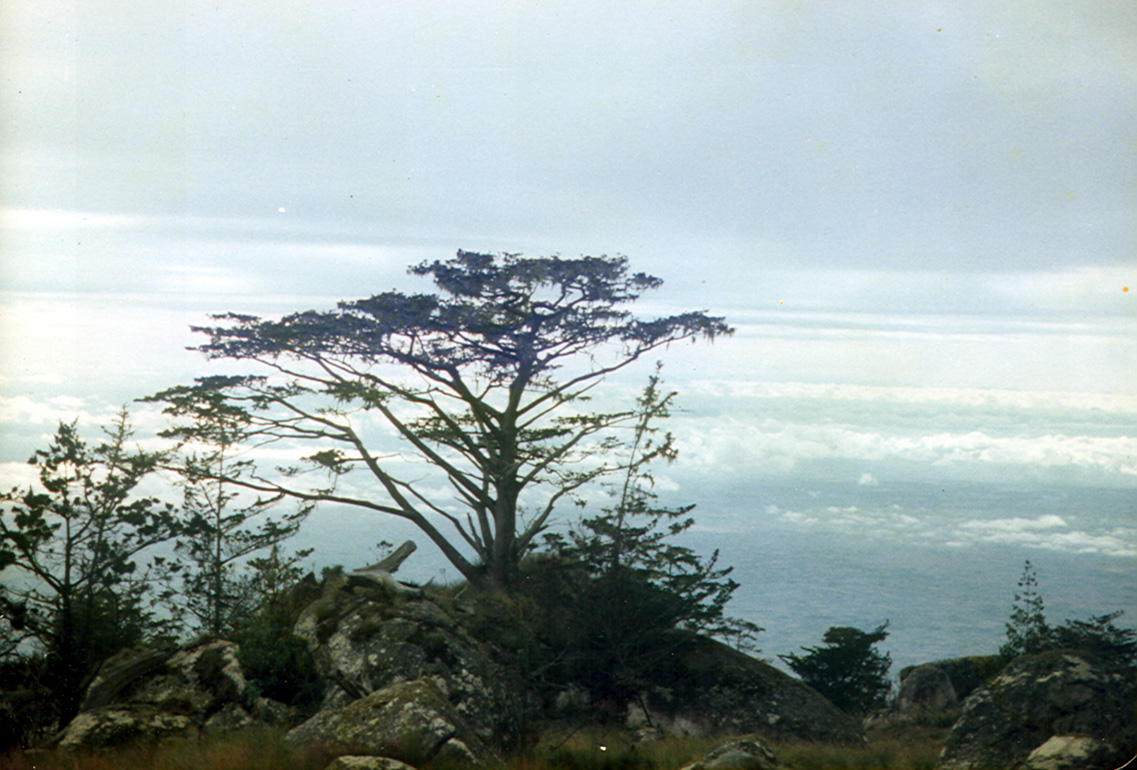
- Mulanje cypress (Widdringtonia whytei) on Mount Mulanje

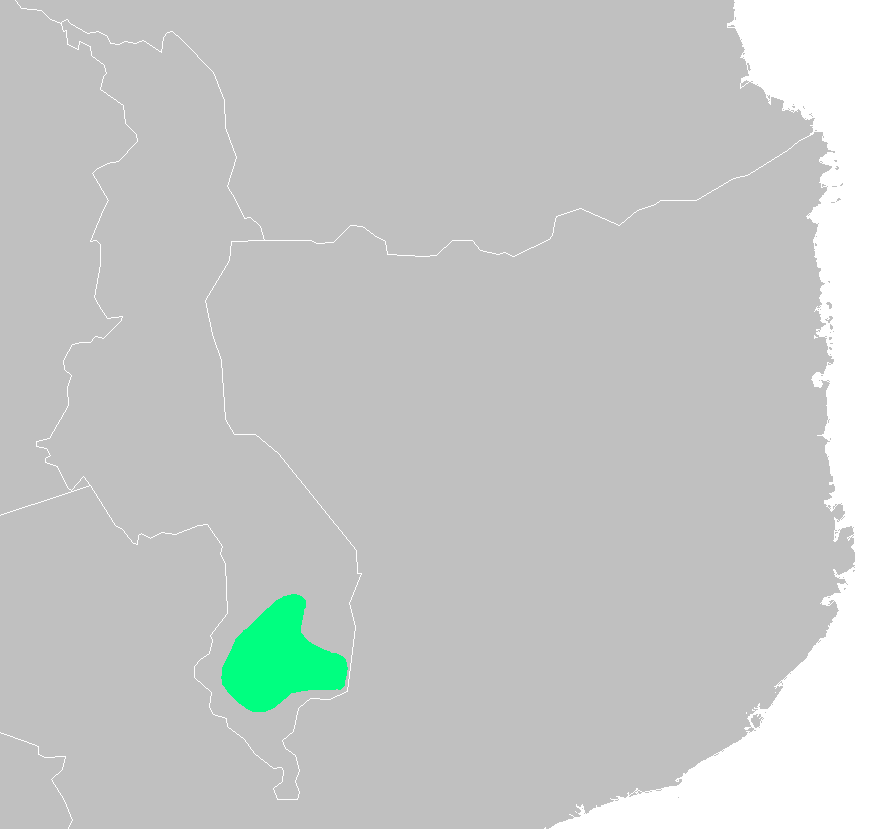
- Extent of the ecoregion in southern Malawi

Ecology
- Realm: Afrotropic
- Biome: Montane grasslands and shrublands

Geography
- Area: 10,100 km^{2} (3,900 mi^{2})
- Country: Malawi

Conservation
- Conservation status: critical/endangered

The South Malawi montane forest–grassland mosaic is an ecoregion of Malawi.

The ecoregion covers a region of highlands and plateaus that includes Mount Mulanje (3,002 m) in the southeast and the lower Shire Highlands to the northeast and east, with the Tuchila Plain between them. The Shire Highlands includes the Zomba Plateau (2,087 m) in the north and the Thyolo Mountains (1,462 m) to the south.

The low valley of the Shire River, part of the African Rift Valley system, bounds the Shire Highlands to the northwest, west, and southwest. The valley of the Ruo River, a tributary of the Shire, bounds the ecoregion on the south and southeast. The Phalombe Plain and the valley of Lake Chilwa lie to the northeast.

The ecoregion enjoyed lush forests, fertile soils, ample water, and mild climate, and is one of the most densely populated regions of Malawi. Blantyre, Malawi's second-largest city, is in the Shire Highlands. Tea is grown commercially in the highlands, especially around Thyolo and Mulanje, and is one of Malawi's chief exports.

The highlands' climate and geology are home to communities of plants and animals distinct from the woodland and savanna ecoregions of the surrounding lowlands. The ecoregion is bounded to the southeast by the Eastern miombo woodlands, and to the northwest by the Southern miombo woodlands. The generally drier Zambezian and mopane woodlands lie to the southwest in the Zambezi lowlands, and to the east in the basin of Lake Chilwa.

== Climate ==
The ecoregion has a tropical highlands climate, generally cooler and more humid than the surrounding lowlands. There is a single summer rainy season between November and April. Moisture-bearing winds from the southeast, known as Chiperone weather, provide occasional moisture during the dry season, producing mist and rain as they encounter the mountain slopes. Northern and western slopes are generally drier than the south and east-facing slopes.

Frosts occur at the highest elevations in the Mulanje Massif.

== Flora ==
The ecoregion has several distinct plant communities, which vary with elevation and exposure.

Until recently, rainforests were predominant on the southern and southeastern slopes of Mt. Mulanje, with the trees Newtonia buchananii and Khaya anthotheca predominant. Most have been cleared, but remnants exist in stream valleys.

Mid-elevation forests are found between 900 and 1,350 meters elevation. Newtonia buchananii, Albizia adianthifolia, Funtumia africana, and Gambeya gorungosana are the dominant trees in the low-canopy forest, and host many lichens, mosses and epiphytes.

Afromontane forests occur in fragmented patches above 1600 meters elevation, with Mulanje cedar (Widdringtonia whytei), Olea capensis, Podocarpus milanjianus, Ekebergia capensis, Cassipourea malosana, and Myrsine melanophloeos as the dominant trees. Mulanje cedar is endemic to the ecoregion, found only on Mulanje in valley forests protected from fire.

Other plant communities include tussock grasslands, and Afromontane heathlands on the highest elevations of Mulanje.

== Fauna ==
The region hosts a large variety of wildlife many of which cannot be found elsewhere. Birds like the Yellow-throated apalis and the Thyolo alethe (Chamaetylas choloensis) are either fully or partially endemic to the region.

== Protected areas ==
Protected areas in the ecoregion include:

- Lengwe National Park
- Majete Wildlife Reserve
- Chiradzulu Forest Reserve
- Malosa Forest Reserve
- Michiru Mountain Conservation Area
- Mulanje Mountain Forest Reserve
- Thyolo Forest Reserve
