= Shire Highlands =

Plateau in southern Malawi

Coordinates: 15.6468°S 35.1256°E

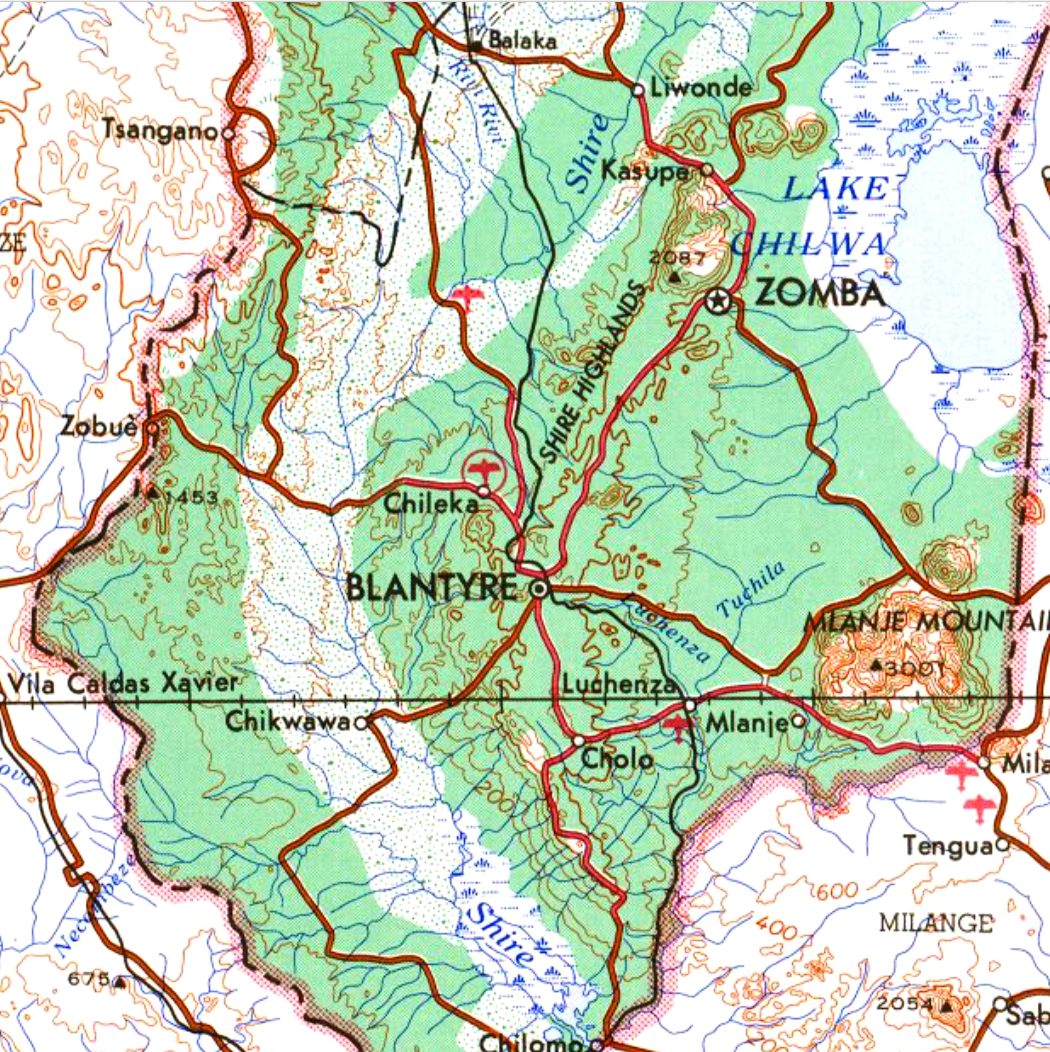
Map of southern Malawi, showing the Shire Highlands and surroundings

The Shire Highlands are a plateau in southern Malawi, located east of the Shire River. It is a major agricultural area and the most densely populated part of the country.

== Geography ==
The highlands cover an area of roughly 7250 square kilometers. the plateau varies in elevation from 600 to 1100 meters, with various hills and mountains rising higher. The highest peak is Zomba Mountain at 2087 meters. The highlands are bounded on the west and south by the valley of the Shire River, an extension of the African Rift Valley. The Phalombe Plain slopes gently towards Lake Chilwa to the northeast, and separates the highlands from the taller Mulanje Massif to the east. Streams originating in the highlands drain west, south, and southeast towards the Shire River, or northeast into the closed basin of Lake Chilwa.

The highlands have a cooler climate and more rainfall than the surrounding lowlands, and are home to distinct forests, woodlands, and grasslands that make up the South Malawi montane forest-grassland mosaic.

The northernmost portion of the plateau includes a line of hills – Chinduzi, Mongolowe, Chaone, and Chikala – that extend 40 km east and west. The taller Zomba Plateau south of them. The northern hills are made up of syenite and nepheline syenite, and the Zomba plateau is made up of syenite and quartz syenite, which intruded into the much older Precambrian igneous and metamorphic rocks that compose much of the highlands. The central portion includes numerous hills and mountains, including Chiradzulu (1774 m), Ndirande (1613 m), Soche (1533 m), and Michiru (1474 m). Thyolo Mountain lies at the southern end of the highlands.

== People ==
Yao are the predominant people of the northern highlands, and Chewa people in the center and south. The Lomwe people also live in the highlands.

Blantyre is the largest city in the highlands. Zomba is the second-largest, and served as the capital of Nyasaland and independent Malawi until 1975. Thyolo is a center of tea production.

== History ==
Archeological evidence shows the highlands have been populated for thousands of years.

In the middle of the 19th century, Yao people migrated eastwards from the northern Mozambican coast, and established chiefdoms in the highlands – Malemia (Domasi), Mlumbe (Zomba), Kawinga (Chikala), Mpama (Chiradzulu), and Kapeni and Somba (in Blantyre District). The Yao chiefs were involved in the trade of ivory and slaves, centered on the Mozambican port of Quelimane.

With encouragement and assistance from David Livingstone during his second Zambesi expedition, in 1861 Bishop Charles Mackenzie of the Universities' Mission to Central Africa set up a missionary station at Magomero, near Zomba in the highlands. After Mackenzie died in 1863, the mission was withdrawn. Later in the 19th century more British missions and plantations were established, expanding British influence in the highlands. In 1891 Harry Johnston was appointed Commissioner and Consul General to the British Central Africa Protectorate, the territories in the British sphere of influence north of the Zambezi River. Johnston set up a headquarters at Zomba, and between 1891 and 1895 subordinated the Yao chiefs to British rule, often by force. Johnston abolished the slave trade, and allowed British missionaries and settlers to lay claim to large tracts of the highlands. By 1894, Johnston had granted 'certificates of claim' to a handful of British settlers, missionaries, and private companies, granting them freehold property rights to 3776 km^{2}, or over half the total area of the highlands. In addition to private lands, Johnston established public or crown lands that included forest reserves, and African trust lands, held by the colonial state for customary use by the native people. Public lands and trust lands were later opened up to leaseholds of up to 99 years, effectively privatizing some of them.

The Shire Highlands Railway Company built a railway across the highlands between 1903 and 1907, from Blantyre in the highlands to the river port of Chiromo, on the Shire River where it meets the Ruo. The railway was later extended north from Blantyre to Salima in central Malawi, south from Chiromo to Port Herald (present day Nsanje) in 1908, and from Port Herald to the Mozambican river port of Chindio on the Zambezi River in 1914.

From the late 19th century, tobacco, cotton, and coffee were grown for export. Coffee growing declined in importance by 1900, displaced by drought and competition with Brazilian coffee growers. Tea plantations were established in the highlands in the 1930s, first around Thyolo where the climate and soils were most favorable. Tea is still economically important in the highlands. Other important crops include tung oil, tobacco, peanuts (groundnuts), and maize (corn).
