= Chiradzulu Mountain =

Mountain in Malawi

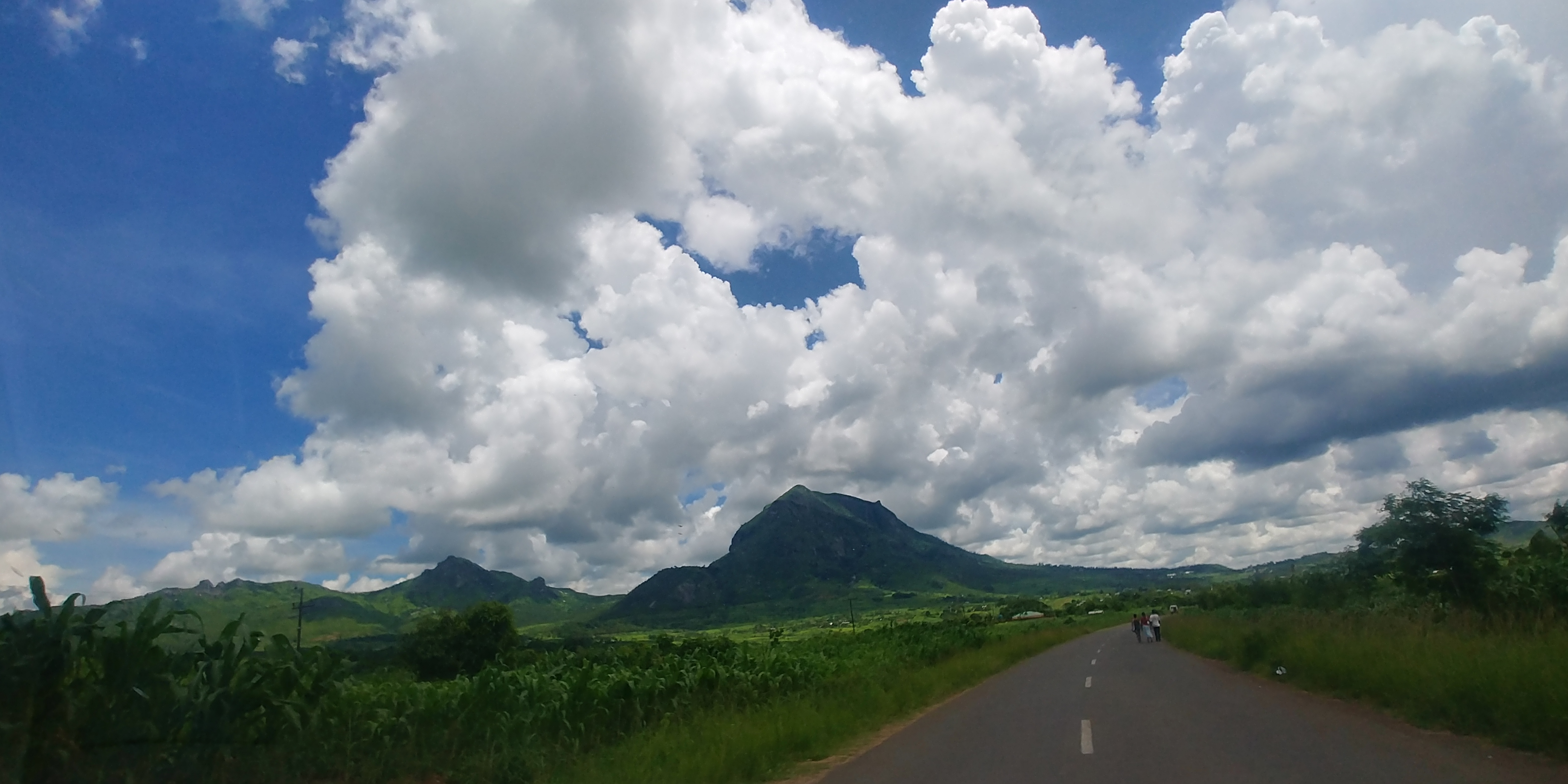

Highest point
- Elevation: 1,773 m (5,817 ft)
- Coordinates: 15.681°S 35.181°E

Geography
- Location within Malawi
- Location: Malawi

Chiradzulu Mountain is located in the Shire Highlands of Malawi, approximately 20 km to the north-east of Blantyre, Malawi's main commercial centre. The administrative district of Chiradzulu in southern Malawi was named after this mountain. Chiradzulu Mountain rises to a peak of 1,773 m (5,817 ft) above sea level and is the third highest mountain peak in southern Malawi, after Mulanje Mountain, whose famous Sapitwa peak rises to 3,002 m (9,849 ft) above sea level, and Zomba Mountain, which rises to 2,085 m (6,841 ft) above sea level at its peak.

== Geography ==
Chiradzulu Mountain rises imperiously from the valley below its southern silhouette and can be viewed by Zomba-bound motorists along the Blantyre-Zomba Road, from as far away as Mapanga. Its massive form looms larger as motorists approach Njuli. It cuts a picturesque backdrop to the east of the Blantyre-Zomba Road as motorists cruise past Njuli, aiming to perhaps stop and catch their breath at Namadzi, an intriguing town by a river of the same name on the Zomba District border. From this vantage point, motorists can, on a clear day, look back to catch one last silhouetted view of Chiradzulu Mountain as it lumbers tantalisingly further to the south-east.

The form of the mountain takes on a curious appearance when viewed at a distance from its southern silhouette. It has the appearance of a huge, overweight man laughing, with its peak forming the head and the rest of its form below, forming the laboured shape of a legless, bloated man. This curious shape has earned the mountain the nickname of "Man Mountain" by tourists. Whilst there are no doubt mythological explanations among the surrounding tribal peoples as to how the mountain acquired its shape, geomorphology would suggest that this is the product of millennia of faulting activity coupled by the chiselling effects of wind erosion on the bare rock outcrops. One would also add that it is the tantalising effects of visual illusion from a distance which completes the picture.

The mountain is actually divided into two parts, each with its own peak. Lisawo - which is the peak motorists view as they drive along the Blantyre-Zomba Road - is a younger sister to the mightier peak described above, which is simply called Chiradzulu. A winding road, a sight-seer's boon, runs between these two peaks. This road joins the villages to the north of the mountain, an area generally referred to as Mpama, with the villages on the foot of the mountain to its south, an area referred to variously as Malika or Lisawo. Midway through the course of its descent up the mountain, the road cuts through a plateaux-like plain between the two peaks, on which the British colonial government established an administrative settlement housing offices, a tourist information centre, and staff accommodation. It is from here that the author used to procure his supplies of "gondolosi" and "kajaliasi" (two potent aphrodisiacs!) from one of the sons of the chief resident forest ranger, a Mr Likharu!

== Ecology ==
Chiradzulu Mountain was for a long time home to a variety of wildlife, including lions, hyenas, foxes, jackals, baboons, monkeys, antelope, wild pigs, and the fabled leopards. Due to overpopulation and poor wildlife conservation practices, some of these species, especially the big cats, have disappeared from the mountain or are at near-extinction levels.

The trees on the mountain were cut down to supply Blantyre residents with charcoal. This loss contributes to the risk of flooding. In 2024 the residents of two settlements, Dokotala and Nkupu, decided to do something about it. They planted trees and they have a rare wooded area. If there is a fire then volunteers are notified so they can prevent a wildfire. The area holds the graves of people who died from leprosy so their work honours those who died.

== Chiradzulu Mountain Forest Reserve ==
Chiradzulu Mountain Forest Reserve was established in 1924, and covers an area of 774 hectares.

== Origin of the name ==
The origins of the name "Chiradzulu" are murky and can be traced back to an old myth supposedly derived from hunters who had forgotten to bring home the tail of a leopard they had killed on a hunting expedition. In ancient local folklore among some of the people who lived at the foot of the mountain, the tail of a leopard was considered to have magical powers and no hunter worth his name would kill a leopard and forget to bring the sought-after trophy home as an essential ingredient for a magical ritual which gave chiefs and notable tribesmen their mythical powers. On realising their foolish lapse of memory the morning after their hunting expedition, the band of hunters reorganised and retraced their steps to the place up in the mountain where they had had their kill. The foolish hunters never made it back home and no one ever heard of them after their disappearance that fateful morning. This was not unusual in those times, for, according to folklore, the mountain was full of ghosts which sometimes exacted vengeance on wayward humans who ventured too far off the beaten track into the thick of the then rich forest jungle by making them mysteriously disappear from the world of mortals, only to be reincarnated as ghosts themselves.

Folklore has it that it is the above episode which gave birth to the name "Chiradzulu", a corruption of two Nyanja words, "mchira" and "wadzulo". "Mchira" literally means "a tail", and "wadzulo" translates to "yesterday's". So "Chiradzulu" literally means "Yesterday's Tail", a reference to the fate of the men who vanished into the jungle to collect the leopard's tail they had forgotten to carry home with them after the previous day's hunting expedition.
