= Zomba, Malawi =

Zomba
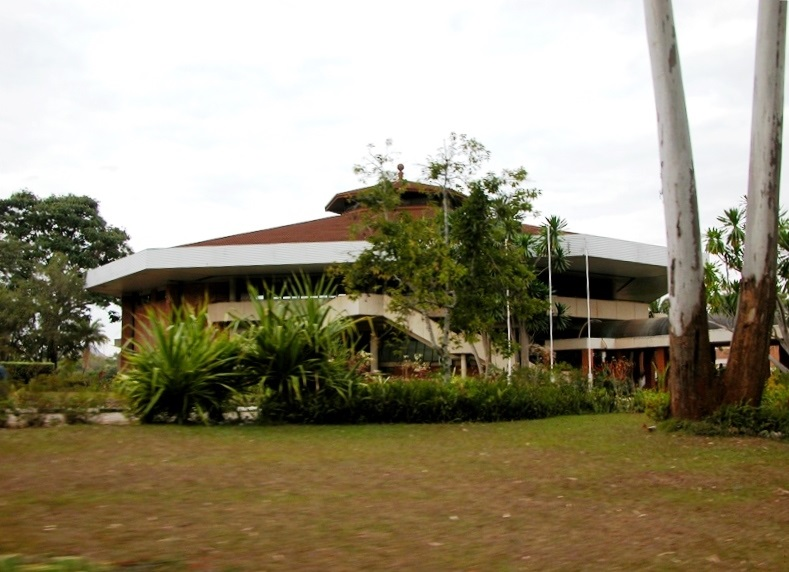
- Chancellor College, University of Malawi

- Location in Malawi
- Coordinates: 15°23′13″S 35°19′09″E
- Country: Malawi
- Region: Southern Region
- District: Zomba District

Area
  - Land: 16 sq mi (42 km^{2})

Population (2018 Census)
  - Total: 105,013
- Time zone: UTC+2
- Climate: Cwa

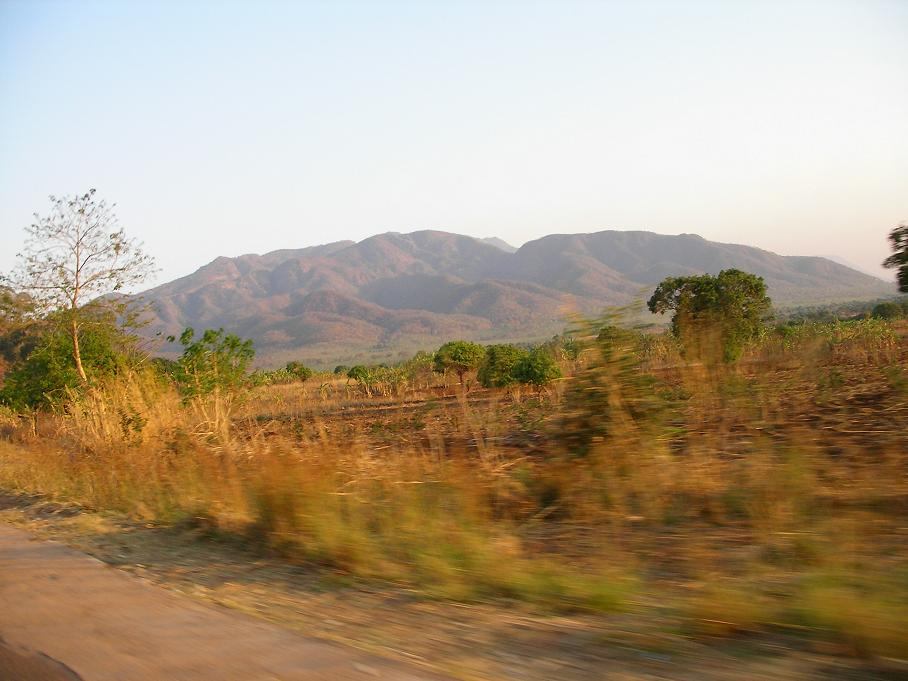
View of Zomba Plateau from highway north of Zomba

Zomba is a city in southern Malawi, in the Shire Highlands. It is the former capital city of Malawi.

It was the capital of first British Central Africa and then Nyasaland Protectorate before the establishment of Malawi in 1964. It was also the first capital of Malawi and remained so until 1974, when Lilongwe became the capital. The Parliament remained even longer, until 1994. The city is best known for its British colonial architecture and its location at the base of the dramatic Zomba Plateau. Zomba is also the home of Chancellor College of the University of Malawi.

== History ==
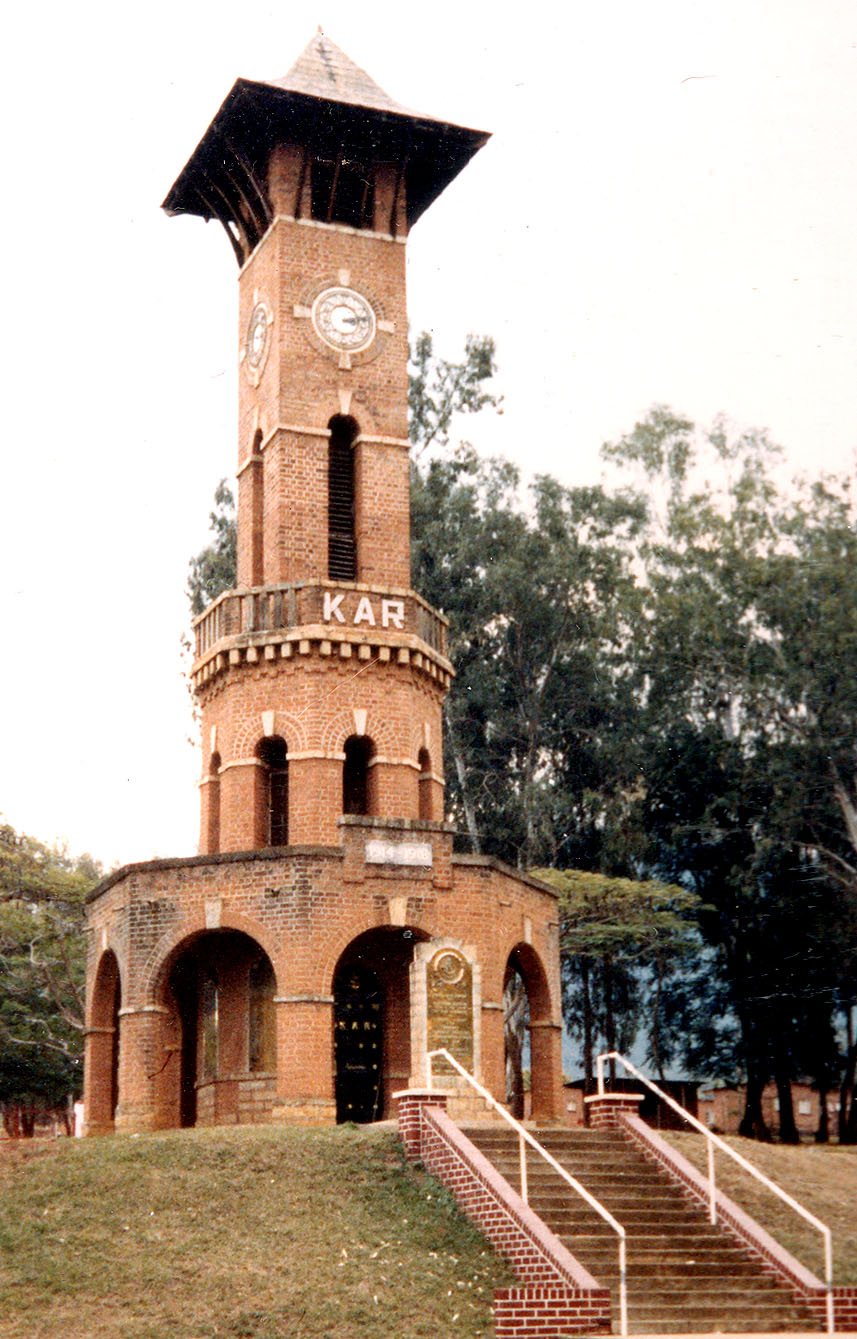
King's African Rifles War Memorial

The town's British colonial past is reflected in the architecture of its older buildings and homes. Zomba was once a hub for expatriates in Malawi. Its diverse cultural mix included British tobacco farmers and Dutch, German and U.S. emissaries. The British also established Sir Harry Johnston Primary School. The Zomba Gymkhana Club was once the focus for social activity in the expatriate community. However, in recent years, the club's appearance and reputation have been in decline. Next to the old parliament building is the botanical garden, which was established by the British, as well as the golf course in the city centre. At the southern entrance to the city, the King's African Rifles memorial is positioned right next to the M1.

During British rule, Zomba served as capital under British Central Africa and later the Nyasaland Protectorate. It was the capital city of independent Malawi from 1964 to 1975.

== Economy ==
Zomba is the centre for the tobacco and dairy farms of the surrounding area, which also produces rice, corn (maize), fish, and softwoods. Timber is extracted from the nearby plateau.

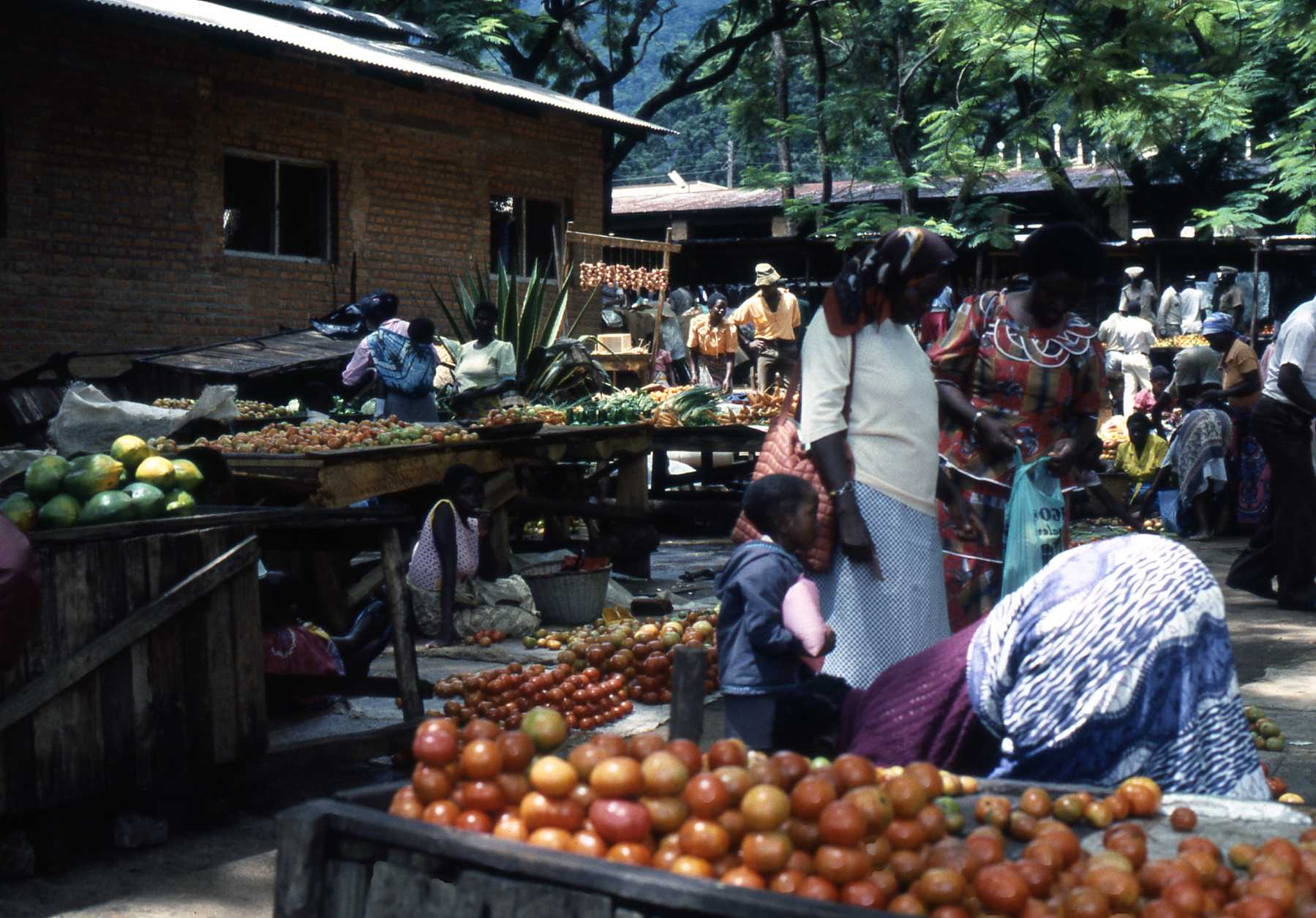
Zomba Market c.1990

A market can be found in the town centre, where farmers from surrounding villages sell their products, as well as secondhand clothes and basic consumer goods. Also fresh and dried fish from Lake Malawi and Lake Chilwa are sold. Local supermarkets, such as Peoples Trading Company, Metro and Shoprite are located near the bus depot. A dozen, mainly Indian- and Chinese-owned, shops sell imported clothes, electrical appliances, bicycles and other basic goods. Along the M1, several filling stations can be found. National Bank of Malawi, NBS savings Bank, Standard Bank and Opportunity Bank International as well as the Malawian Post have branches in the city.

Zomba Hospital is an important employer and one of the biggest hospitals in the country.

Zomba Central Prison was built in 1935, and is the only maximum-security prison in Malawi.

=== Tourism ===
The main attraction in Zomba is the Zomba Plateau. Activities offered include rock climbing, birdwatching, fishing and mountain-biking. The Ku Chawe Inn, situated right on the edge of the plateau, is the most luxurious hotel in the area. Tourists also can sleep in log houses or camp at the trout farm. Within the town, two backpacker hostels and several lodges, ranging from basic to mid-class, are open for guests. A craft market provides locally made souvenirs.

== Education ==
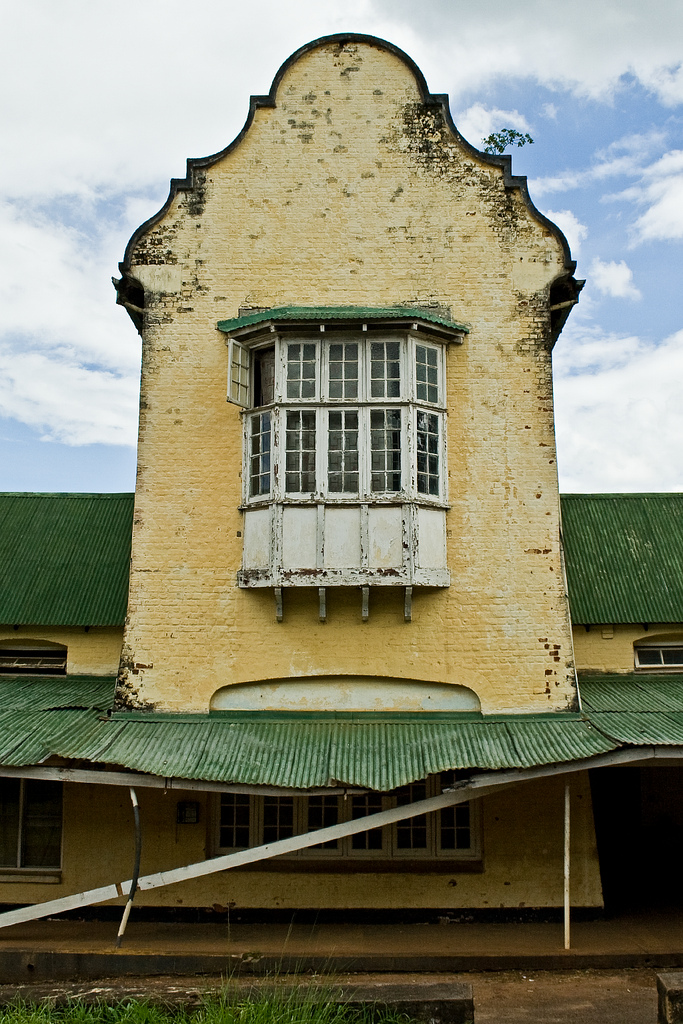
Facade in Zomba

=== University of Malawi ===
Chancellor College, the largest of the constituent colleges of the University of Malawi, is located in Zomba. The college has five faculties: Faculty of Humanities, Faculty of Science, Faculty of Law, Faculty of Social Science and Faculty of Education.

=== Sir Harry Johnston International Primary School ===
Sir Harry Johnston International School has served the international and local community since 1958. The primary school consists of a seven classroom block (pre-Nursery to year 6) and the secondary school consists of three classrooms and a science laboratory. There is also a spacious multi-purpose hall on site used by both schools. Within the grounds there is a swimming pool, a football and netball field, a basketball court, a cross-country track, a playground and a nursery play area. The curriculum is based on the British National Curriculum in the Primary and the Cambridge Curriculum in the Secondary School, but content is adapted for the needs of the school population. The school is centrally located on Kalimbuka Road. It has students from a range of nationalities with around 80% of the students Malawian. The school is non-profit making and is managed by an elected board of trustees from the parent community. The school's swimming-pool is open to public from September to May each year.

=== Zomba Catholic Secondary School ===
Located around 5 kilometres (3 miles) from the Old Capital city's town centre, this is a government-funded school founded in 1942 by the Catholic church. A community of Marist Brothers is located on site and the Brothers help with the teaching. Although funded by the government, pupils are still required to pay fees (MK107,000 per term as of 2017) as they live on campus and must pay board. The school is one of the best government schools in Malawi and competition for entry is intense. The school has around 600 pupils and 30 teachers as well as several administrative staff. It is also well known as Box 2 and BOCCO (Boys Of Courage And Cooperation).

=== Theological colleges ===
Zomba Theological College was founded in 1977 and is run by the five synods of Blantyre, Livingstonia, Nkhoma, Harare and Zambia but also works closely with the theological department of the University of Malawi. The National Theological Seminary of the Catholic Church is also located in Zomba.

== Geography ==
The Zomba Plateau is Zomba's most famous feature. In some parts, it rises to 1800 m in height and is covered with vast tracts of African juniper and Widdringtonia, and other mixed vegetation. The top of the plateau is criss-crossed by streams and is dotted with waterfalls and still lakes. The hike to the top of the Plateau is a common tourist activity.

From the top of the plateau, it is possible to see Lake Chilwa to the east, Mount Mulanje to the southeast and the Shire River to the west. The Mulunguzi River springs from the plateau and flows through the town.

== Climate ==
Climate data for Zomba
Month	Jan	Feb	Mar	Apr	May	Jun	Jul	Aug	Sep	Oct	Nov	Dec	Year
Mean daily maximum °C (°F)	27 (80)	27 (80)	26 (79)	26 (78)	24 (76)	22 (72)	22 (72)	24 (75)	27 (81)	29 (85)	29 (85)	27 (81)	26 (79)
Mean daily minimum °C (°F)	18 (65)	18 (65)	18 (65)	17 (62)	14 (58)	12 (54)	12 (53)	13 (55)	15 (59)	18 (64)	19 (66)	18 (65)	16 (61)
Average precipitation mm (inches)	310 (12.1)	250 (9.9)	260 (10.1)	69 (2.7)	18 (0.7)	10 (0.4)	7.6 (0.3)	7.6 (0.3)	5.1 (0.2)	25 (1)	110 (4.3)	280 (10.9)	1,340 (52.9)
Source: Weatherbase

== Fauna ==
The bird, the white-winged apalis (Apalis chariessa), has been sighted in the evergreen forest along the Mulunguzi River. It is estimated that only 50 pairs remain in the wild.

The eastern egg eater snake (Dasypeltis medici medici) has been found and several specimens recorded, including one of 112 cm.

== Transportation ==
The easiest way to get to Zomba is by minibus or shared taxi from Blantyre via the M3. The highway between Zomba and Blantyre has been renovated and upgraded from 2012–2015. To and from Lilongwe you can take The Smart bus; a daily service with only a couple of stops along the way. Departing Zomba at 6:30AM and Lilongwe 12:30PM. National Bus Service as well as private run mini-buses connect Zomba with Liwonde (1hr, K1,500), Mangochi (2,5hrs, K 3,500), Balaka, Lilongwe and Lake Malawi. For Cape Maclear (4hrs, K 6,500 - 7,000) you go via Liwonde, Mangochi and Monkey Bay. Trucks and pick-ups transport passengers to Phalombe. For Mulanje you take a minibus to Limbe where you change to Mulanje.

The closest airport is Chileka International Airport, Blantyre, 75 kilometres south of Zomba. Lilongwe Lilongwe International Airport is 4 hours by car from Zomba.

Public transport within the city is organised by minibuses and taxis (approx K 2,000 for a journey within town; K 6,000 to go up the mountain). However, cycling and walking are the most widely used modes of transportation. Bikes can be rented in town to cycle around or up the mountain.

== Demographics ==
=== Historical population ===
Year	Population
1977	24,234
1987	43,250
1998	65,915
2008	88,314
2018	105,013

Historical population
Year	Pop.	±% p.a.
1977	24,234	—
1987	43,250	+5.96%
1998	65,915	+3.90%
2008	88,314	+2.97%
2018	105,013	+1.75%

=== Ethnic groups ===
Ethnic Groups in Zomba City (2018 Census)
Ethnic Groups	percent
Lomwe	30.96%
Yao	20.59%
Chewa	12.76%
Ngoni	10.5%
Nyanja	10.35%
Mang'anja	5.97%
Tumbuka	4.17%
Sena	2.05%
Tonga	1.05%
Nkhonde	0.55%
Lambya	0.33%
Sukwa	0.06%
Other	0.66%

Zomba is multiethnic. According to the 2018 census, the Lomwe are the largest ethnic group in the city with 30.96% of its population. The second largest ethnic group in the city are the Yao with 20.59% of the population. Other minor ethnic groups include the Chewa with 12.76%, Ngoni with 10.5%, Nyanja with 10.35%, Mang'anja with 5.97%, Tumbuka with 4.17%, Sena with 2.05%, Tonga with 1.05%, Nkhonde with 0.55%, Lambya with 0.33%, Sukwa with only 0.06%, and all other ethnic groups compose 0.66% of the city's population.

=== Religion ===
Religions in Zomba City (2018 Census)
1. Church of Central Africa Presbyterian (20.2%)
2. Catholic (17.7%)
3. Seventh-day Adventist/Baptist/Apostolic (11.4%)
4. Pentecostal (9.55%)
5. Anglican (3.28%)
6. Other Christian (20.9%)
7. Muslim (14.2%)
8. Traditional (0.04%)
9. Other (2.22%)
10. No Religion (0.44%)

The largest religious denomination in Zomba City is Church of Central Africa Presbyterian with 20.24%. The largest minority religion is Catholicism with 17.67%. Other minor religions include Seventh-day Adventist, Baptist, and Apostolic with 11.45%, Pentecostal with 9.55%, Anglican with 3.28%, other Christian denominations with 20.95%, Islam with 14.17%, Traditional with only 0.04%, other religions with 2.22%, and no religion with 0.44% of the city.

== Religion ==
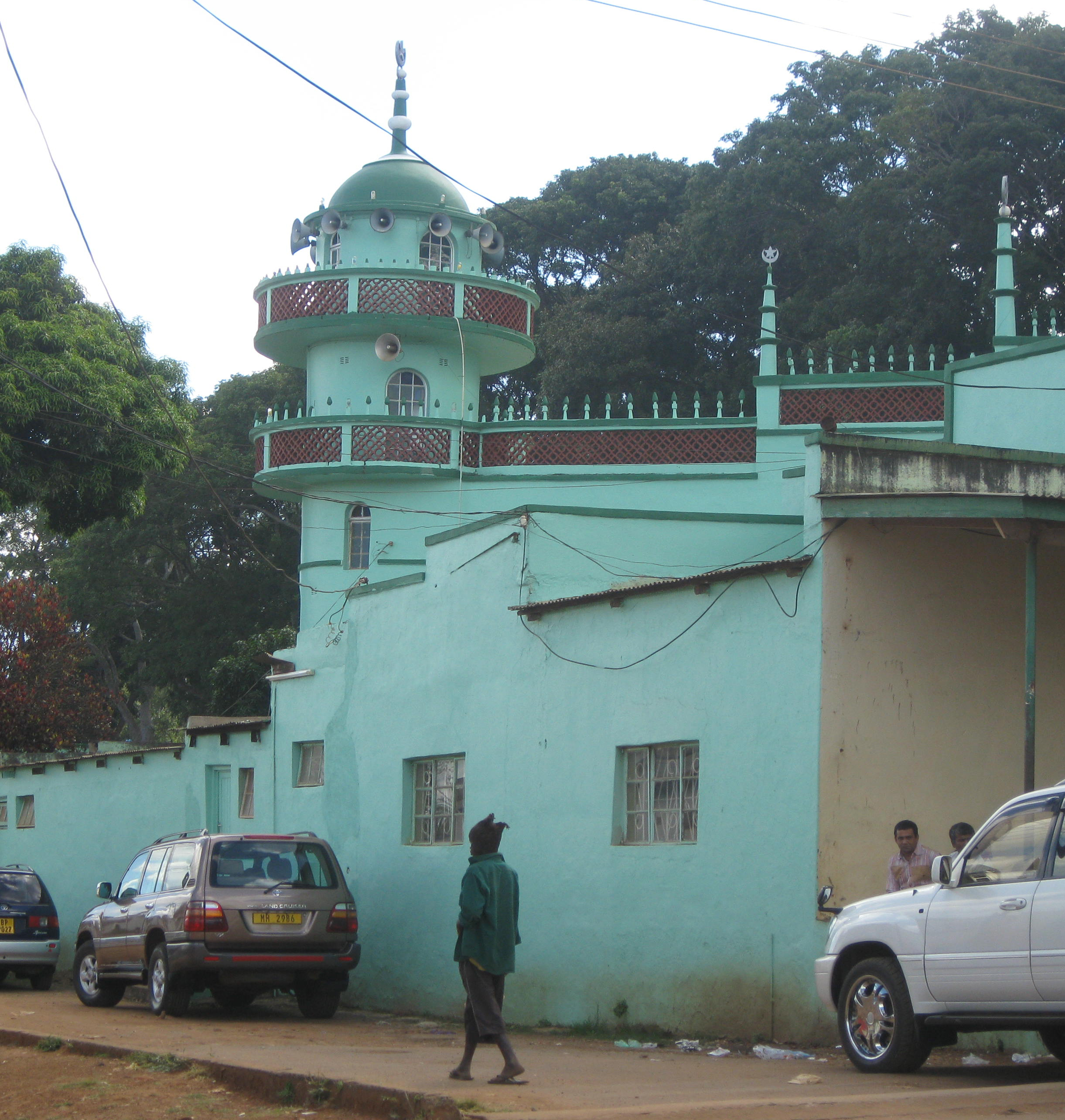
Zomba Mosque

Zomba is influenced by the Muslim community of Yao and Muslim Malawians of Indian descent. The main mosque is close to the market.

Several Christian churches have branches in Zomba; the city is seat of the Roman Catholic Diocese of Zomba.

== Sister cities ==
Since 2008, Zomba is a sister city with Urbana, Illinois.

== Gallery ==
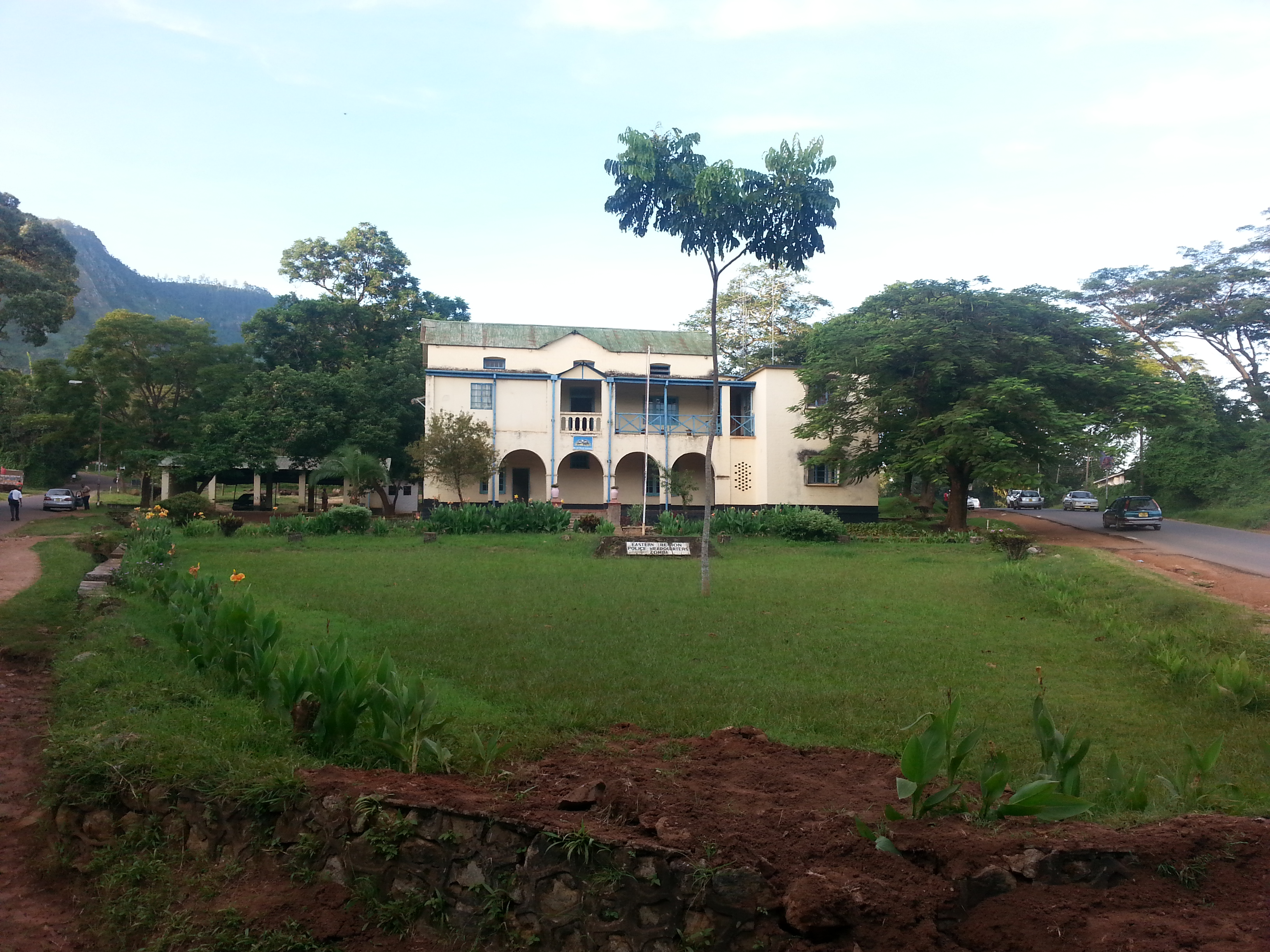
Eastern Region Police Headquarters, Zomba, Malawi

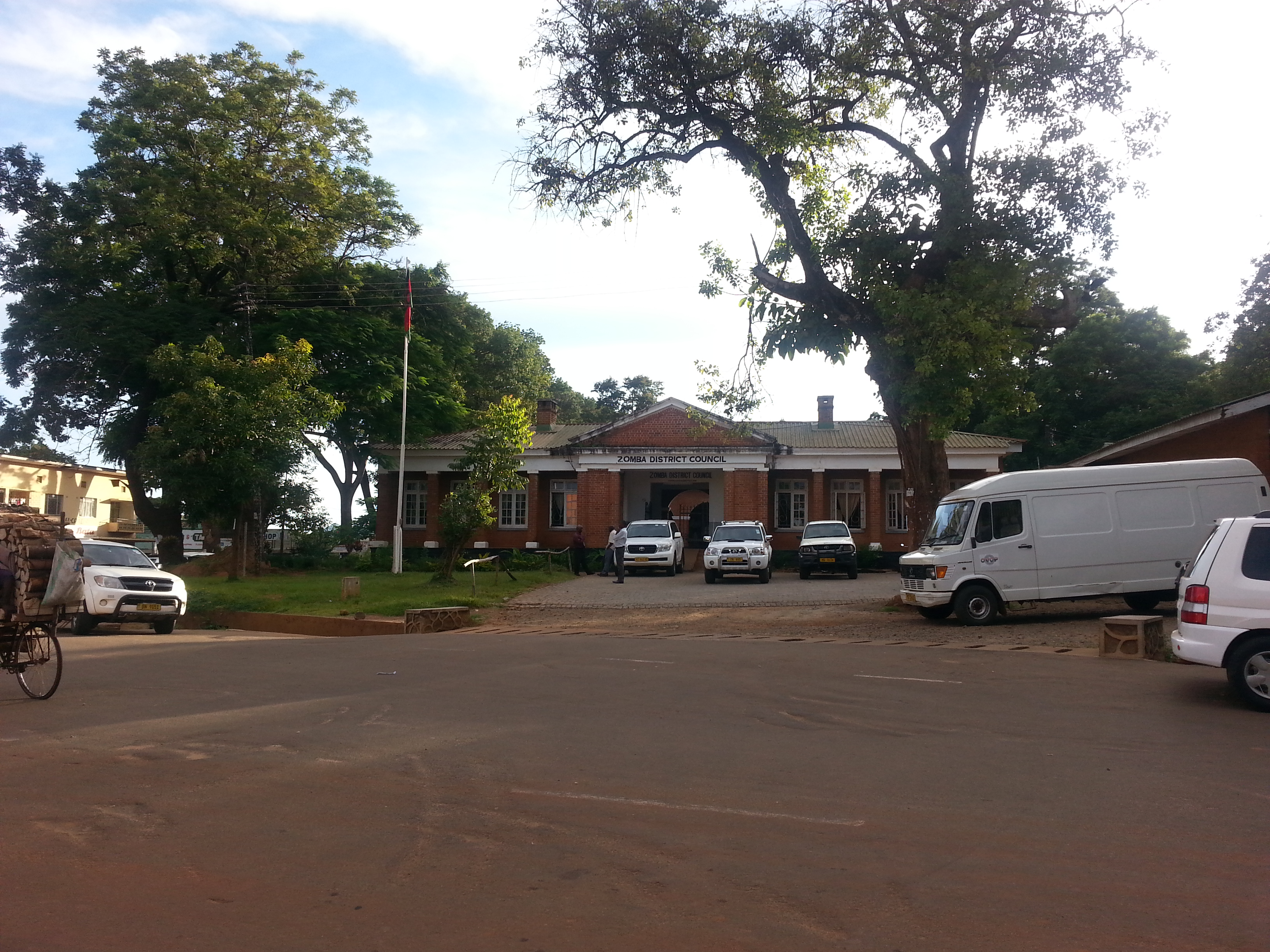
Zomba District Council Building, in Zomba City

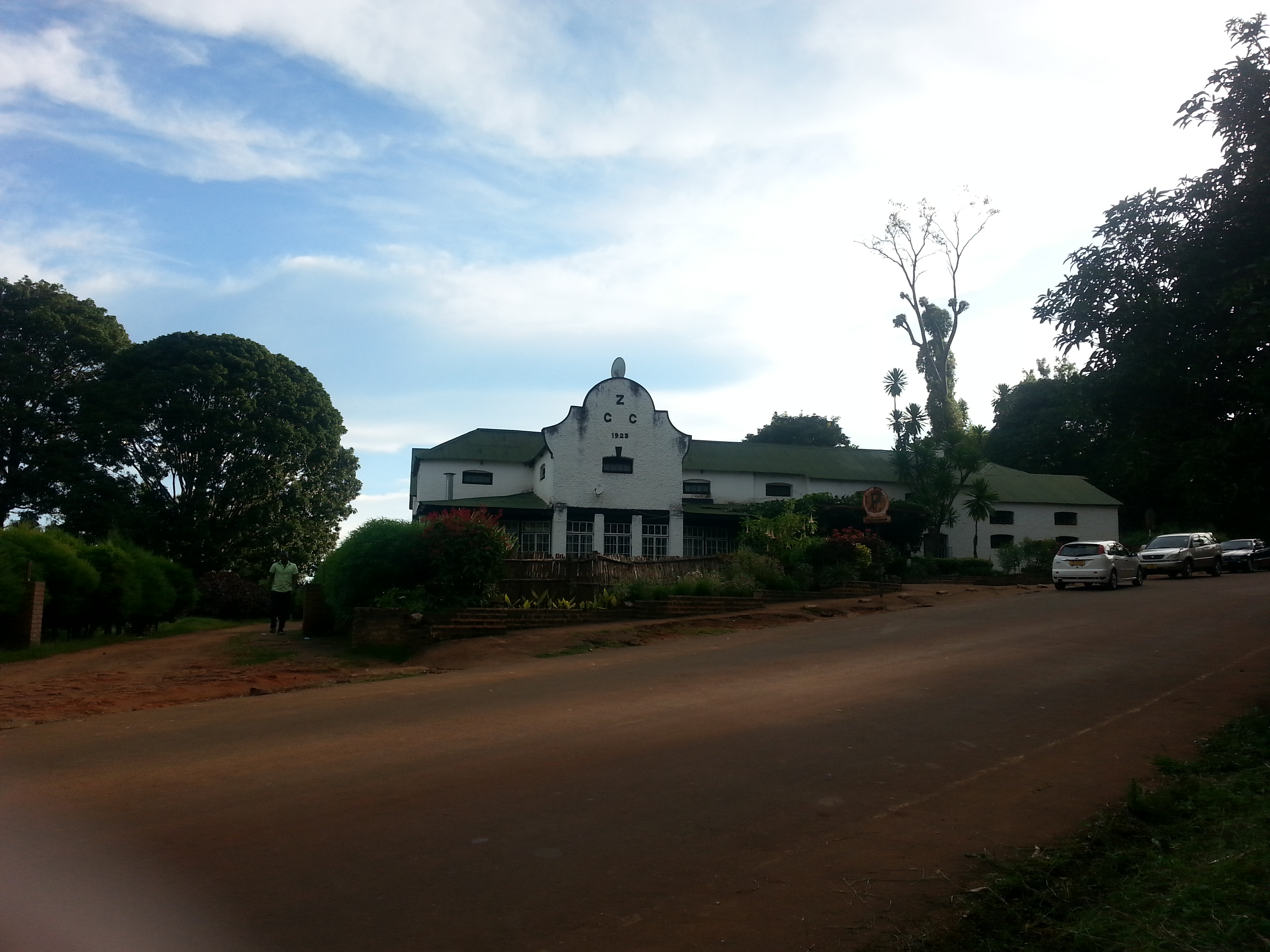
Gymkhana Club in Zomba, established 1923

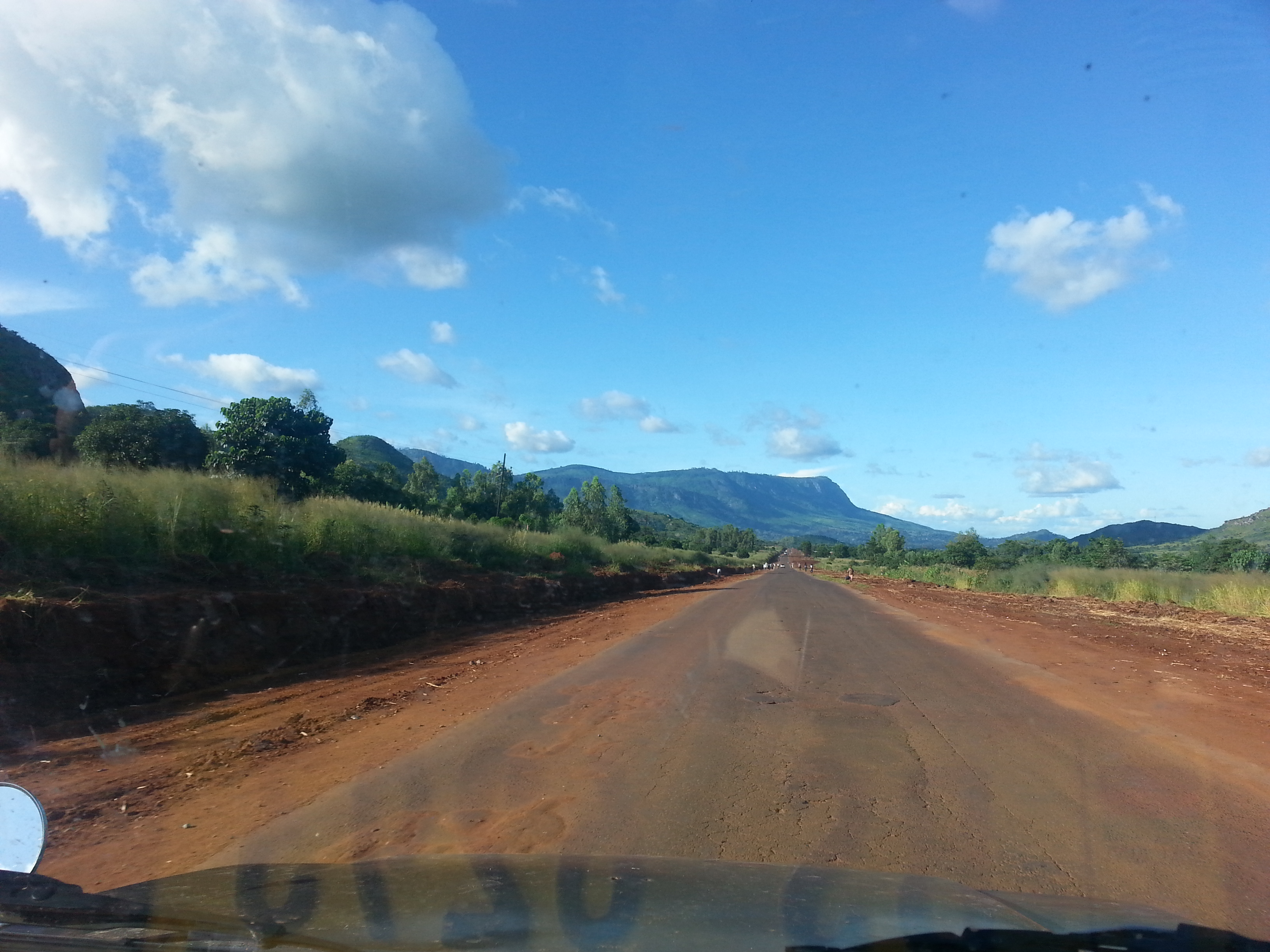
Zomba Plateau approached from the Blantyre-Zomba road, which was being renovated when this picture was taken in March 2014

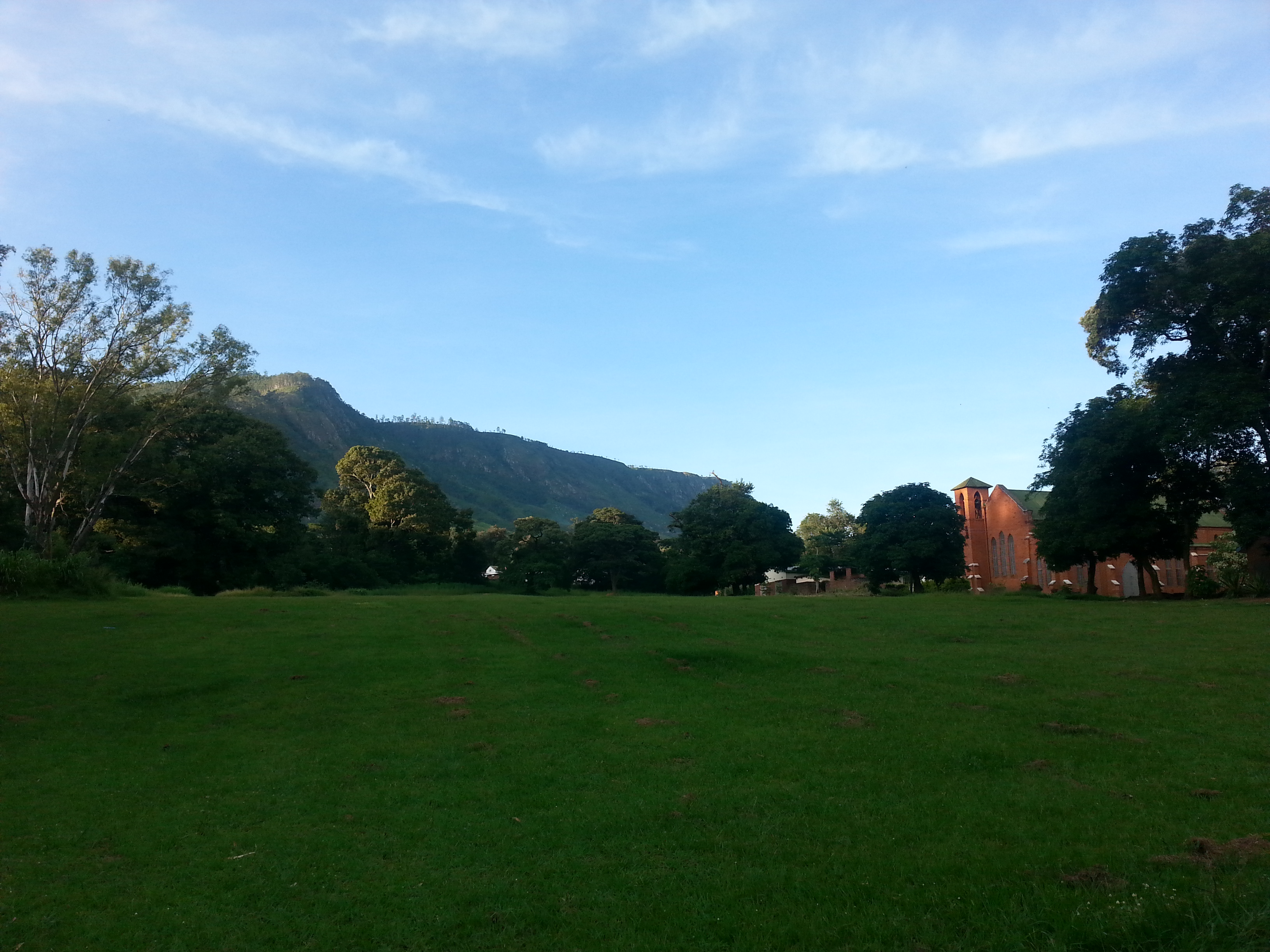
CCAP Church in Zomba with Zomba golf course and Zomba Plateau in the background
