= Chiperoni =

Malawian term for a kind of drizzle rain

Chiperoni is a Malawian term for a kind of drizzle rain, experienced in the Shire Highlands of southern Malawi during the cold, dry season.

The name is derived from Mount Chiperone in Moçambique. Mount Chiperone is an isolated mountain peak at the southern extremity of a chain of East African mountain ranges. It lies 40 km south of the border town of Milange. It is covered with montane forests and is surrounded by deciduous woodlands (mainly Brachystegia-dominated).

When the wind blows from south south east, clouds are forced to rise over Chiperoni mountain and bring cold and rainy conditions to the Shire Highlands.

== Brand name ==
Chiperoni is a brand name for blankets produced locally in Malawi by Conforzi Plantations in Thyolo. The factory has a spinning and weaving section with a production capacity of 3000 blankets per day.

== Song ==
There is a song called Chiperoni by Zambian songwriter Alick Nkhata.
