= Aubrey Mwasinga =

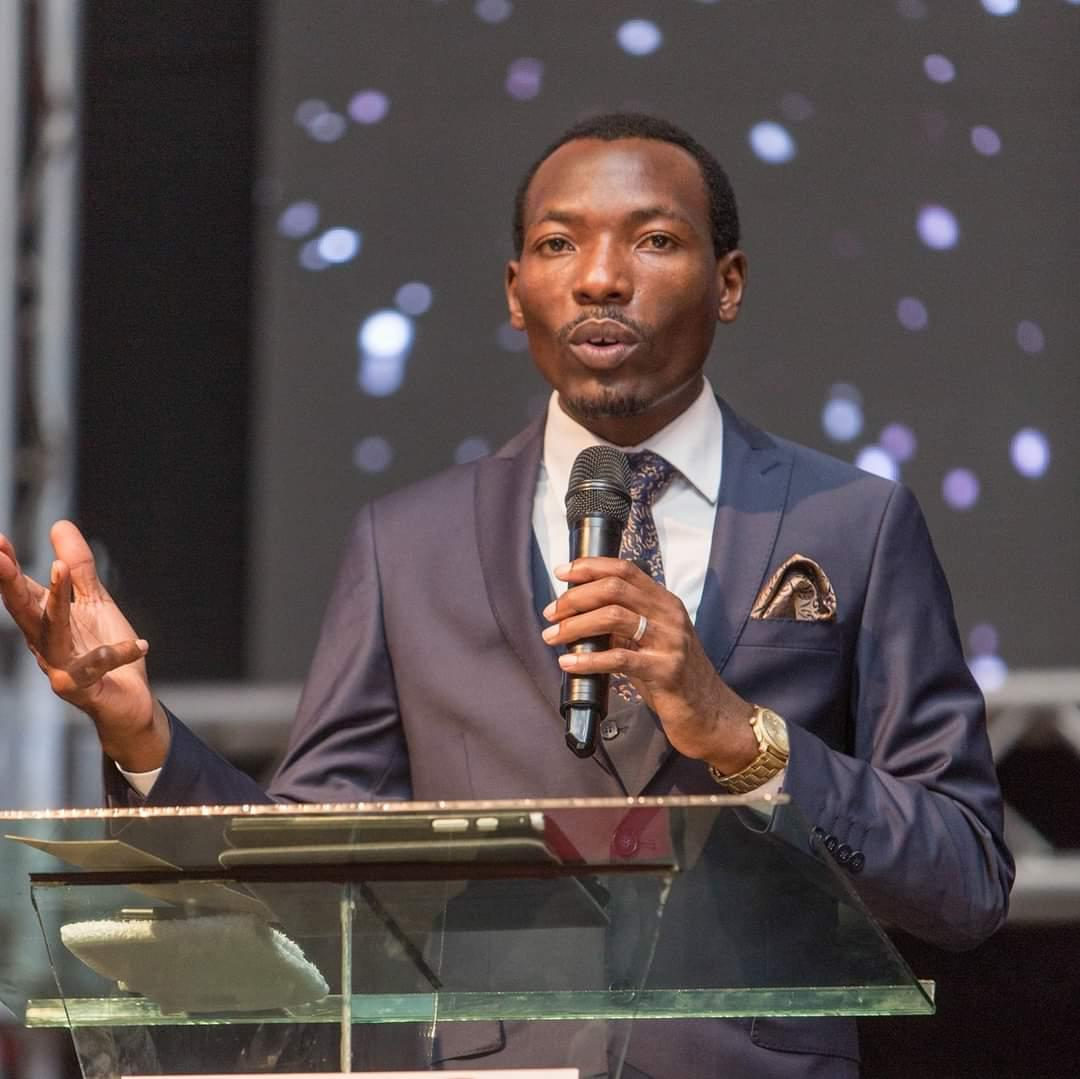
- Born: 21 December 1986 (age 38); Blantyre, Malawi
- Organization: Raised for a Purpose Ministries (RFP)
- Title: Pastor

Aubrey Mwasinga (born 21 December 1986) is the founder and president of Raised For a Purpose Ministries also known as RFP Ministries, headquartered in Blantyre, Malawi, Southeastern Africa. Aubrey is also an accountant, author, and philanthropist. In October 2011, Aubrey Mwasinga married Emma Mwasinga. They have a son and a daughter.

== Early life and education ==
Mwasinga earned his Bachelor's in accountancy from the Polytechnic University of Malawi, before graduating from University of Derby with a Master of Business Administration. He is also a chartered accountant with the Association of Chartered Certified Accountants.

== Ministry ==
Mwasinga founded and is president and senior pastor of the Raised for a Purpose (RFP) ministry. The RFP organizes the International Grand Conference on Combining Spiritual and Academic Excellence (IGCSAE).

In 2017, Mwasinga of Zone Z, an interdenominational organization which teaches finances to its members. In 2019, Mwasinga announced plans to open a commercial bank, with members of his ministry as the initial shareholding base. At the time he was consulting with the Reserve Bank of Malawi on the legality of it.

In 2021, Aubrey Mwasinga was listed among 7 famous Pastors and prophets in Malawi by BusinessMalawi.com and RFP Ministries was listed among the 12 presently most famous churches in Malawi
