= Mount Soche =

Mountain in Malawi

Mount Soche is a mountain near Blantyre, Malawi.

Soche Forest Reserve was established in 1922, and covers 388 hectares.
