= Baptist Convention of Malawi =

- Classification: Evangelical Christianity
- Theology: Baptist
- Associations: Baptist World Alliance
- Headquarters: Lilongwe, Malawi
- Origin: 1970
- Congregations: 2,000
- Members: 300,000
- Seminaries: Baptist Theological Seminary of Malawi in Lilongwe

The Baptist Convention of Malawi is a Baptist Christian denomination in Malawi. It is affiliated with the Baptist World Alliance. The headquarters is in Lilongwe.

== History ==
The Baptist Convention of Malawi has its origins in an American mission of the International Mission Board in 1959. It is officially founded in 1970. According to a census published by the association in 2023, it claimed 2,000 churches and 300,000 members.

== Schools ==
It has 1 affiliated theological institute, the Baptist Theological Seminary of Malawi in Lilongwe.

== Health Services ==
It founded the Senga Bay Baptist Medical Clinic Salima, Malawi.
