= Zomba Plateau =

Mountain in southern Malawi

Coordinates: 15.3272°S 35.3208°E

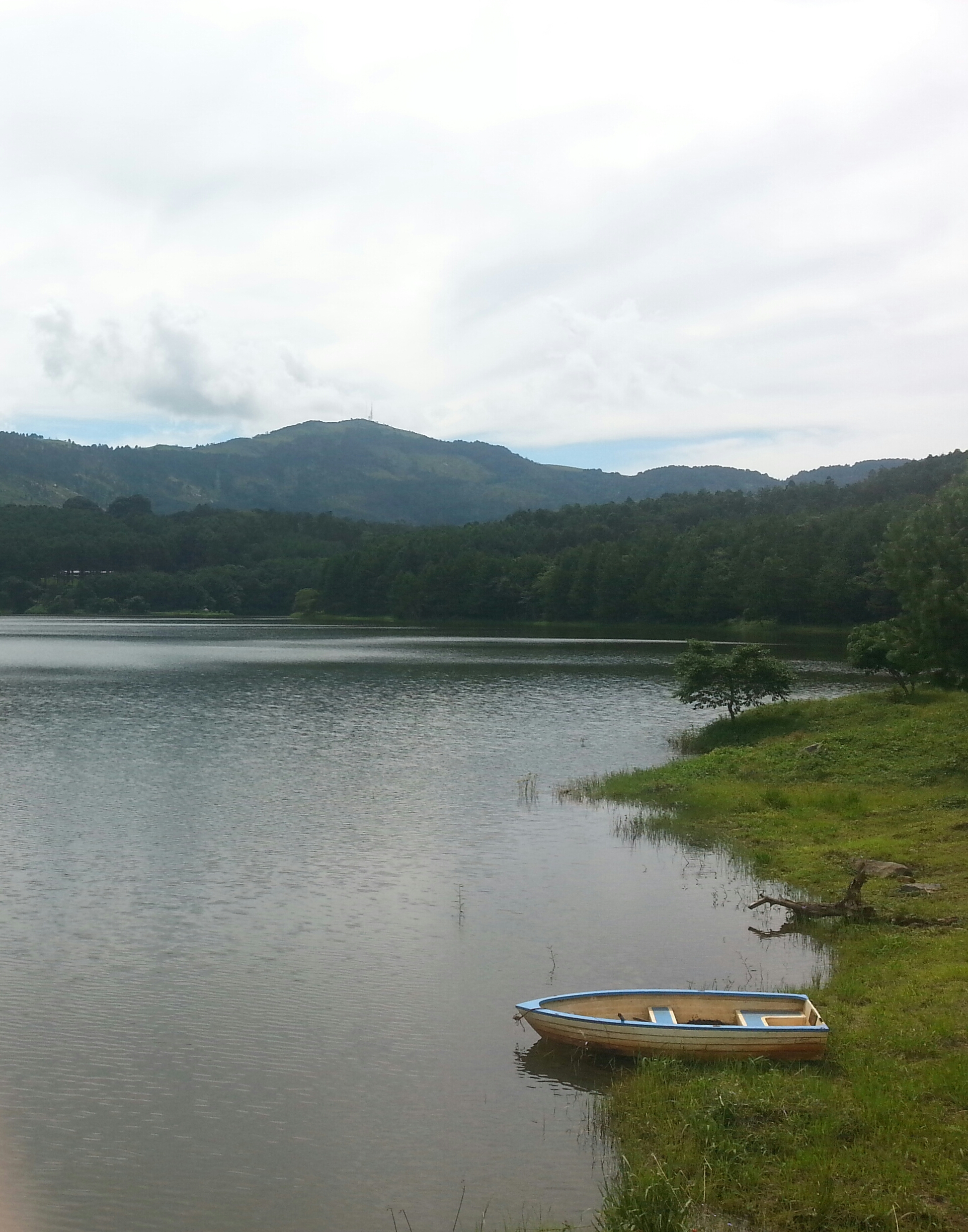
Mulunguzi dam seen from the east, during rainy season

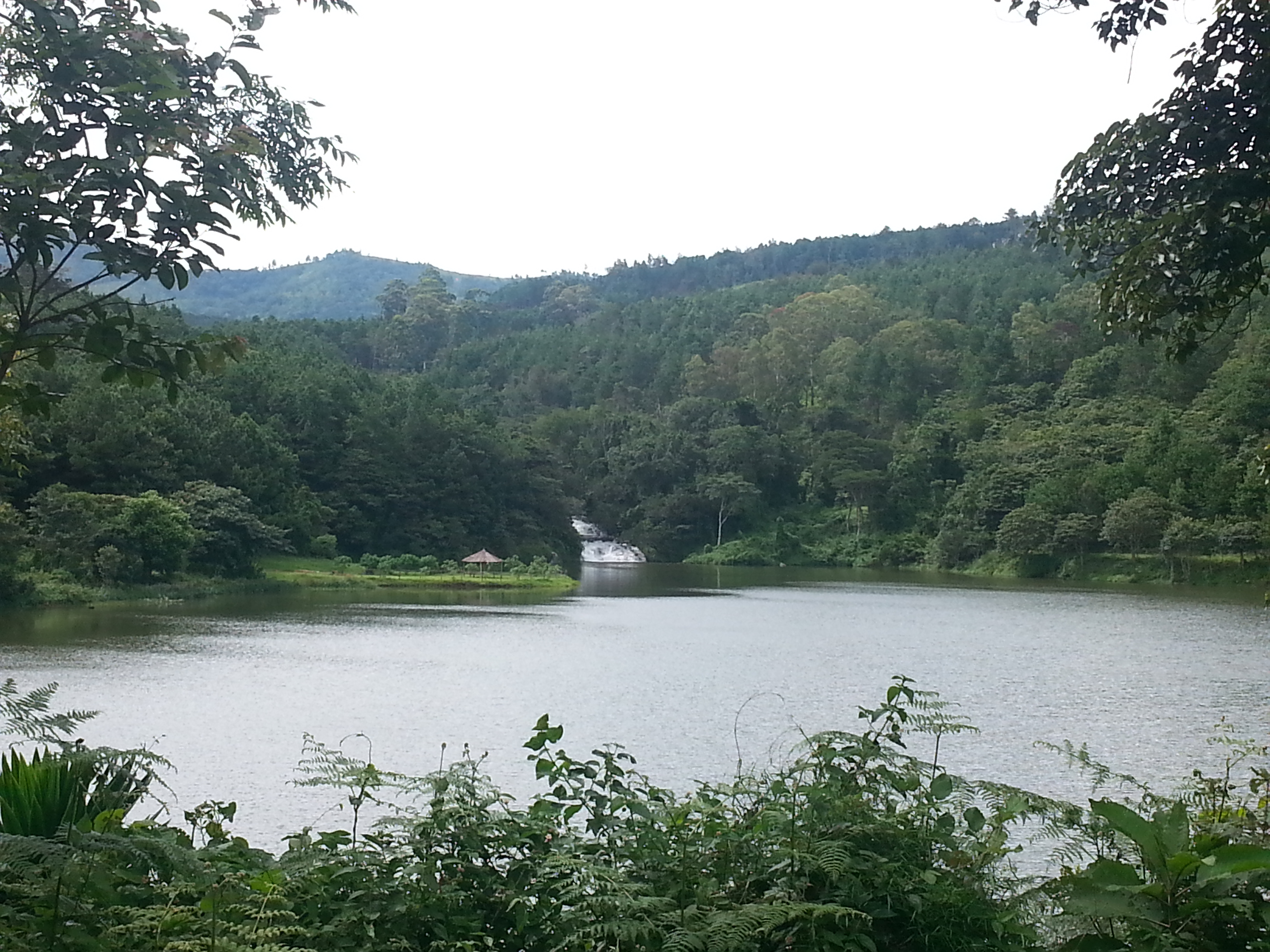
Picnic area at Mulunguzi river entering Munlunguzi dam through Williams Falls, on Zomba Plateau

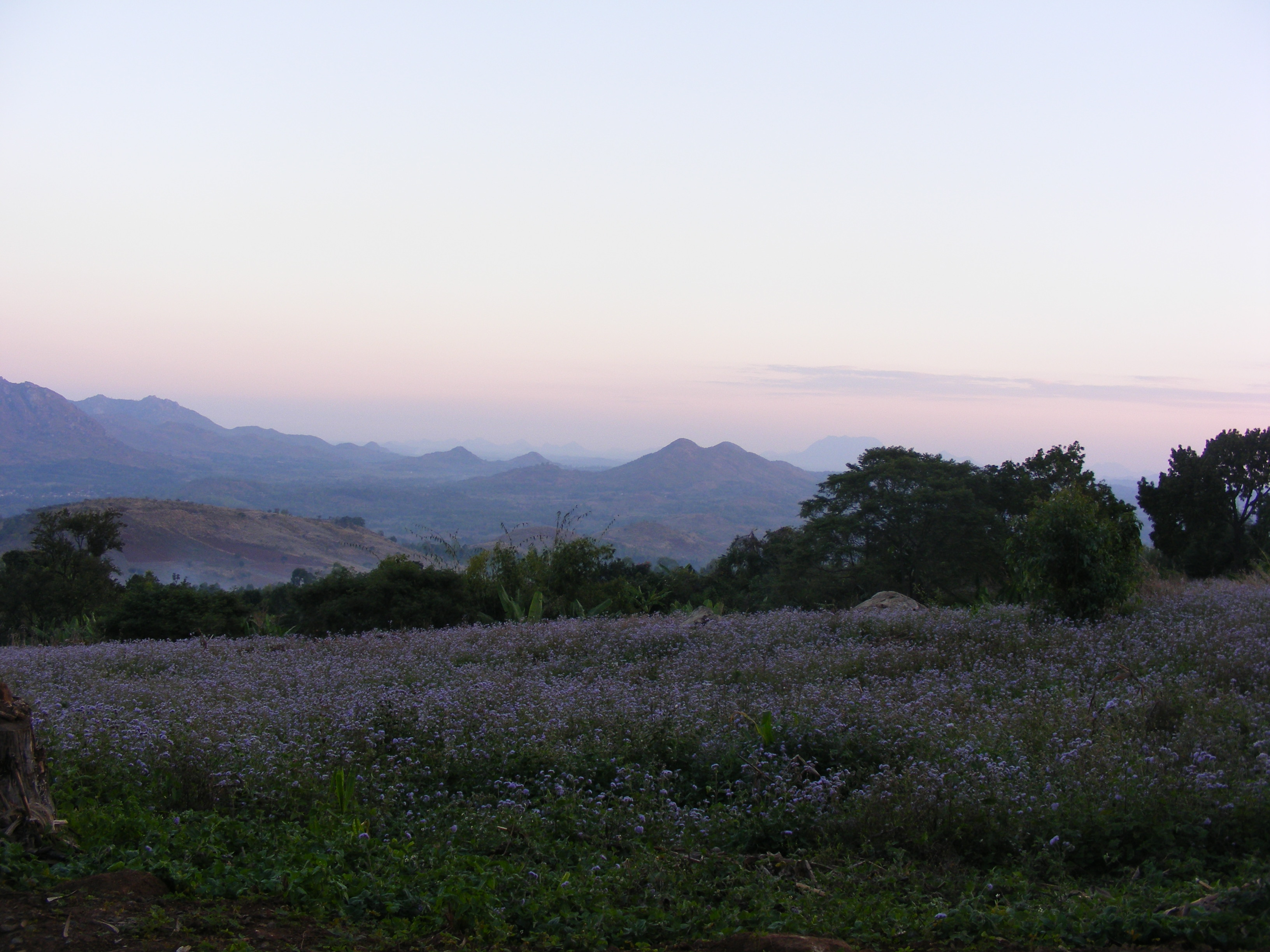
South-East view from the road going on Zomba Plateau

The Zomba Plateau, also called the Zomba Massif, is a mountain of the Shire Highlands in southern Malawi. Its total area is about 130 square kilometres (50 sq mi), with a highest point of 2,087 metres (6,847 ft).

The plateau is roughly pear-shaped. The southern portion is known as Zomba Mountain, and the northern portion as Malosa. The deeply incised Domasi Valley runs east and west between the two.

The plateau largely made up of granitic syenite, an igneous rock that intruded into the older metamorphic rocks that make up the highlands during the late Jurassic and Cretaceous periods 150-65 million years ago. The Mulanje Massif to the southeast is of similar composition and origin. Precious and semi-precious stones such as quartz can be found.

The Zomba and Malosa forest reserves were established in 1913. Most of the plateau is covered with plantations of Mexican pine trees (Pinus patula). Small patches of native montane forest and miombo woodland remain. The pines were planted for timber production for the Zomba Sawmill, which is located at the southern slopes of the mountain. Where indigenous trees are left, severe deforestation due to the high demand for firewood in the region is a problem. Fruits like strawberries, yellow-berries and blackberries are grown on the mountain for the local market.

The Zomba Plateau is the region's major tourist attraction. Activities offered include hiking, rock-climbing, fishing and mountain-biking. A paved all-weather road leads from Zomba on the plateau. The massif hosts several accommodations for tourists, such as the Sunbird KuChawe Inn and several camping grounds. Additionally, several companies and institutions, such as the CCAP Church, as well as private persons have cottages on the plateau.

On clear days, Blantyre and the Mulanje Massif, which are both about 60 km away, can be seen. From the western edge of the plateau, Shire River and Liwonde National Park can be seen. The Zomba Plateau is included in a proposed ecoregion, to be called the South East Africa Montane Archipelago (SEAMA).

In 2000, the Mulunguzi Dam was opened, which serves as a water reservoir for the City of Zomba.
