= Thyolo =

- Location in Malawi
- Coordinates: 16°04′S 35°08′E
- Country: Malawi
- Region: Southern Region
- District: Thyolo District

Population (2018 Census)
  - Total: 7,843
- Time zone: +2
- Climate: Cwa

Thyolo is a town located in the Southern Region of Malawi. It is the administrative capital of Thyolo District. Traditional Authority Mphuka in Thyolo District is one of the 10 Traditional Authorities in Thyolo District in Malawi. There are a number of activities considered unsustainable that communities in the area practise which are detrimental to development.

Malawi being an agricultural based economy production is dependent on natural resources whose availability and stability cannot be guaranteed in the area. Livelihoods are affected by non sustainable practices such as wanton cutting down of trees, shifting cultivation, and poor agricultural practices. The drivers of deforestation and soil erosion are interrelated with growing human population, increased demand of firewood and limited job opportunities being the main ones. The State of Environment Report of 2000 for the district identified five pressing environmental issues for the district and these included: overpopulation, encroachment in water catchment areas, poor public place sanitation, declining fish catch from natural water bodies and loss of biodiversity. One other thing that has exacerbated the social economic status of the people in this district is the introduction of tea estates a long time ago which took almost all cultivatable land away from the inhabitants leaving them only with casual labouring in the estates as an alternative for survival. The estates do little, if not nothing, for the lives of these vulnerable people.

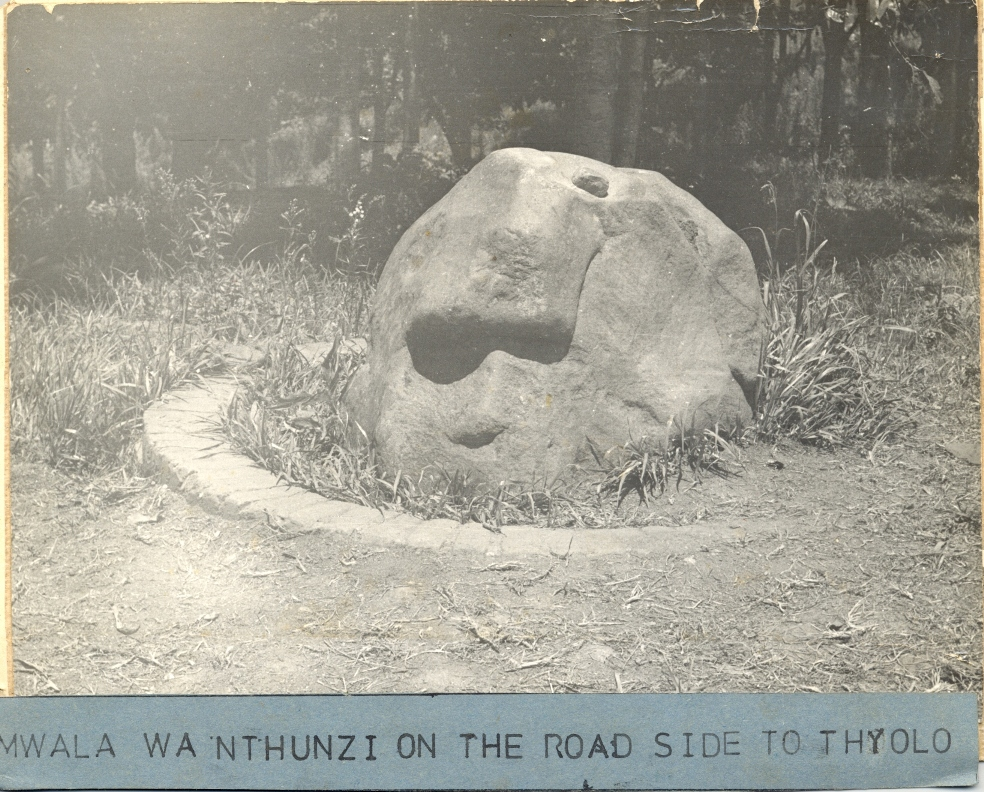
Mwala wa Nthunzi (rock of the shade), on the roadside to Thyolo.

== Geography of the area ==
Thyolo District is located in southern region of Malawi on the Shire highlands. It borders Mulanje to the east, Blantyre to north, and Nsanje to the south. Thyolo receives an average total rainfall of 1,125 mm (44 in) per year. The terrain in Thyolo District is transverse. The climate is dry and with savanna type of vegetation. Generally the area terrain is sloppy surrounded by mountains and rivers/streams. The soil is roam clay and some parts are rocky. TA Mphuka is about 40 kilometres from Thyolo District Council (60 km from Luchenza). The road network is relatively good but the quality of the roads is poor. This is compounded by the undulating nature of the plain that is characterised by steep descents and the rocky formation of the road surface.

Climate data for Thyolo (1961–1990)
Month	Jan	Feb	Mar	Apr	May	Jun	Jul	Aug	Sep	Oct	Nov	Dec	Year
Mean daily maximum °C (°F)	27.7 (81.9)	27.5 (81.5)	27.0 (80.6)	25.7 (78.3)	24.4 (75.9)	22.4 (72.3)	22.2 (72.0)	24.8 (76.6)	27.9 (82.2)	30.0 (86.0)	29.8 (85.6)	28.2 (82.8)	26.5 (79.7)
Daily mean °C (°F)	22.5 (72.5)	22.5 (72.5)	21.9 (71.4)	20.6 (69.1)	18.5 (65.3)	16.2 (61.2)	16.2 (61.2)	16.4 (61.5)	18.0 (64.4)	20.9 (69.6)	22.9 (73.2)	23.2 (73.8)	20.0 (68.0)
Mean daily minimum °C (°F)	18.7 (65.7)	18.6 (65.5)	18.2 (64.8)	16.6 (61.9)	13.5 (56.3)	11.4 (52.5)	11.1 (52.0)	12.0 (53.6)	14.1 (57.4)	16.8 (62.2)	18.1 (64.6)	18.7 (65.7)	15.7 (60.3)
Average precipitation mm (inches)	225.7 (8.89)	218.2 (8.59)	218.0 (8.58)	97.4 (3.83)	28.7 (1.13)	29.2 (1.15)	30.1 (1.19)	13.5 (0.53)	9.1 (0.36)	42.9 (1.69)	101.0 (3.98)	244.0 (9.61)	1,257.8 (49.52)
Average precipitation days (≥ 0.3 mm)	18	16	17	11	7	7	6	4	2	5	10	16	119
Average relative humidity (%)	82	84	84	81	77	78	77	69	59	62	68	80	75
Mean monthly sunshine hours	189.1	173.6	195.3	210.0	232.5	207.0	217.0	260.4	264.0	266.6	231.0	176.7	2,623.2
Mean daily sunshine hours	6.1	6.2	6.3	7.0	7.5	6.9	7.0	8.4	8.8	8.6	7.7	5.7	7.2
Source: NOAA

=== Population of the area ===
There are 39 villages in TA Mphuka. These villages fall under 5 Group Village Headmen (GVH) also known as Village Development Committees (VDC) and 1 sub VDC. Average household size is 4.2. There is an approximate total population of 63,710 in 15,071 households in scattered nuclear settlements. The majority of the people are Amang’anja and partly Alomwe tribes.

=== Demographics ===
Year	Population
1987	4,449
1998	5,337
2008	7,029

== Environmental Challenges ==
Severe and widespread environmental degradation is taking place in TA Mphuka and surrounding areas. The main root cause of environmental degradation in the area is poverty coupled with dwindling crop production due to scarcity of land for agricultural activities. This problem has forced the local communities to encroach the forest reserve and cultivate in the buffer zone of the rivers and streams.

=== Effects of deforestation ===
The deforestation has resulted to siltation on the rivers hence reducing the quantity of water in the rivers. The quarterly flows measures being undertaken by Ministry of Irrigation and Water Development in conjunction with Thyolo District Council through District Coordination Team (DCT) quarterly flow measure report of October to December 2010 revealed that flows are declining. The depletion of natural resources at Mphuka is causing a series of problems which include; poor quality of water supply hence high incidences of water borne diseases within the area and loss of biodiversity.

There are cultivations in the river beds and banks which are detrimental to biodiversity. The practice accelerates siltation and the rivers will eventually dry up. It is feared that if pragmatic measures are not put in place to address this problem, it can become worse.

=== Major causes of environmental degradation ===
The major causes of this environmental degradation include poverty and high population growth. Some of the notable environmental problems in Mphuka include:

- River siltation/sedimentation.
- Drying up of perennial rivers.
- Soil erosion up to 37% annually.
- Reduced water levels in the rivers.
- Rampant deforestation along the river banks.
- Lack of respect for the Forest Reserve boundary at Dzimbiri Headquarters and surrounding villages
- Reduction in wild animal population.
- Loss of vegetation cover and creation of bare hills.
- Climate change among others.

In addition, deforestation and agricultural expansion taking place in Mphuka due to population growth has lowered the water table of the entire Mphuka Area. Besides poverty and low crop production, it appears that general lack of environmental education and communication has also compounded the spread of environmental degradation. It was envisaged that many people think that nature takes care of itself hence no need for local communities to conserve environment. It is therefore believed that local communities' needs, assets, interests, and aspirations are taken into account, and there is need to promote and yield substantial and long lasting solutions to nature conservation in the area for the benefit of the present and future generations.
