= Michiru Mountain =

Mountain in Malawi

Coordinates: 15°45′S 34°58′E

Michiru Mountain is located about 5 miles north of the city of Blantyre, Malawi, on the edge of the Great Rift Valley. The summit sits at an elevation of 3,925 feet, although because it rises from a high plateau its prominence is only a few hundred feet. The mountain is known for its many species of birds. The road to Michiru is uneven and can only be accessed by off-road vehicles.

Michiru Mountain Forest Reserve was established in 1970, and covers an area of 3004 hectares.
