= Blantyre =

City in Malawi

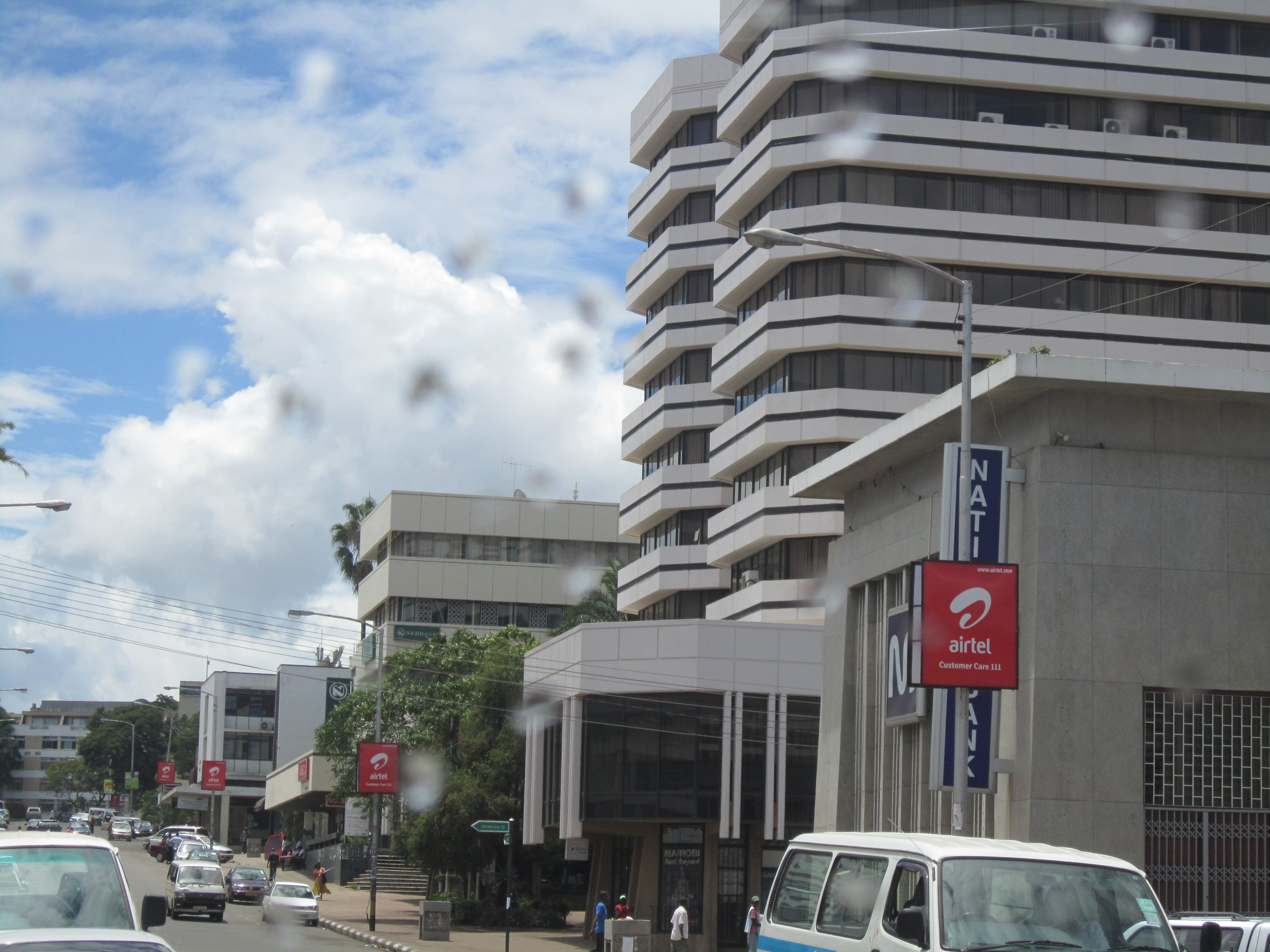
- Busy road in Blantyre City

- Location in Malawi Blantyre (Africa)
- Coordinates: 15°47′10″S 35°0′21″E
- Country: Malawi
- Region: Southern Region
- District: Blantyre District
- Founded: 1876
- Municipality: 1895

Government
  - Mayor: Isaac Jomo Osman

Area
  - Total: 240 km^{2} (93 sq mi)
- Elevation: 1,039 m (3,409 ft)

Population (2018)
  - Total: 800,264
  - Density: 3,300/km^{2} (8,600/sq mi)
- Time zone: +2
- HDI (2017): 0.541 medium
- Climate: Aw
- Website: www.bccmw.com

Blantyre is Malawi's centre of finance and commerce, and its second largest city, with a population of 800,264 as of 2018. It is sometimes referred to as the commercial and industrial capital of Malawi as opposed to the political capital, Lilongwe. It is the capital of the country's Southern Region as well as the Blantyre District.

== History ==
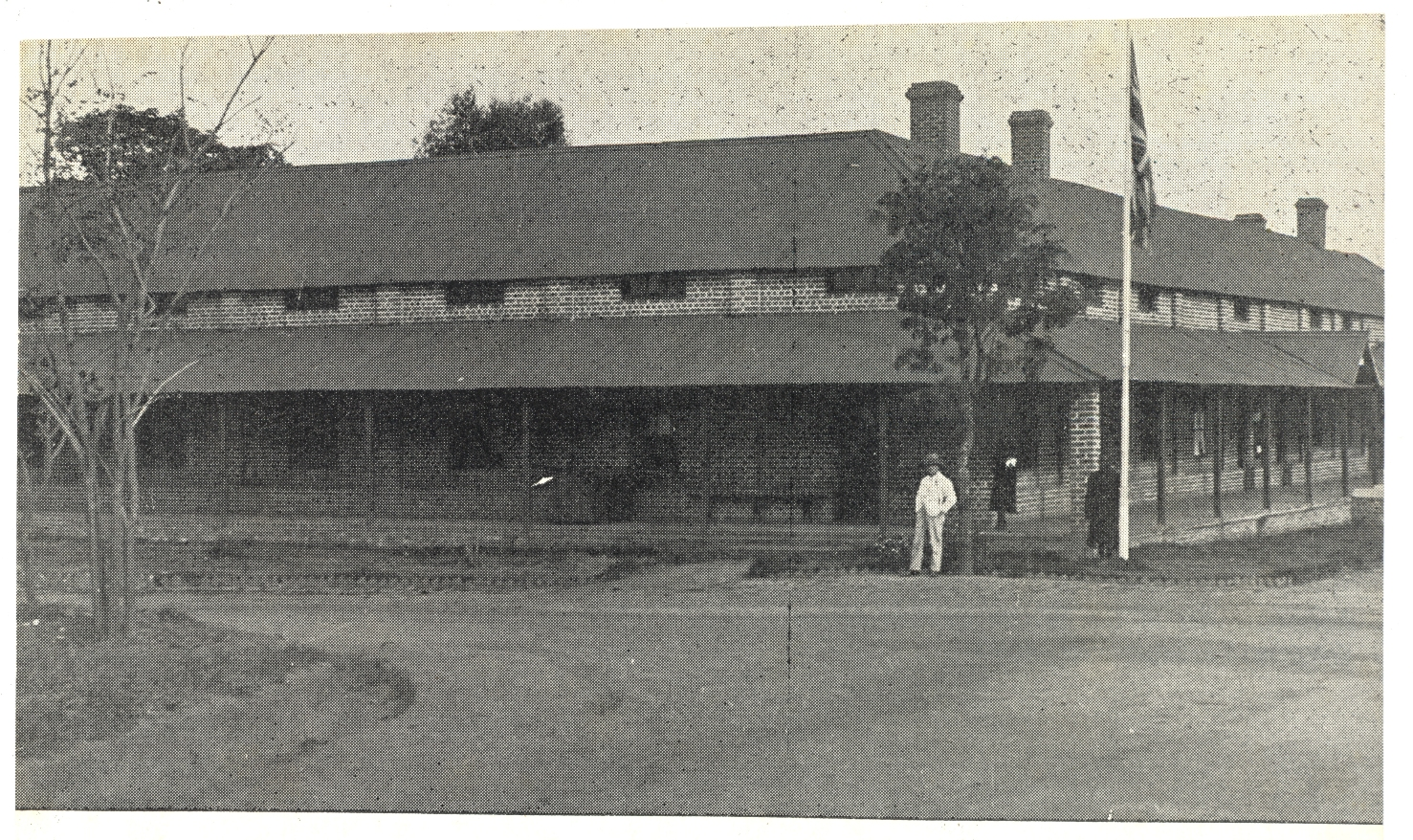
Blantyre government offices in 1904.

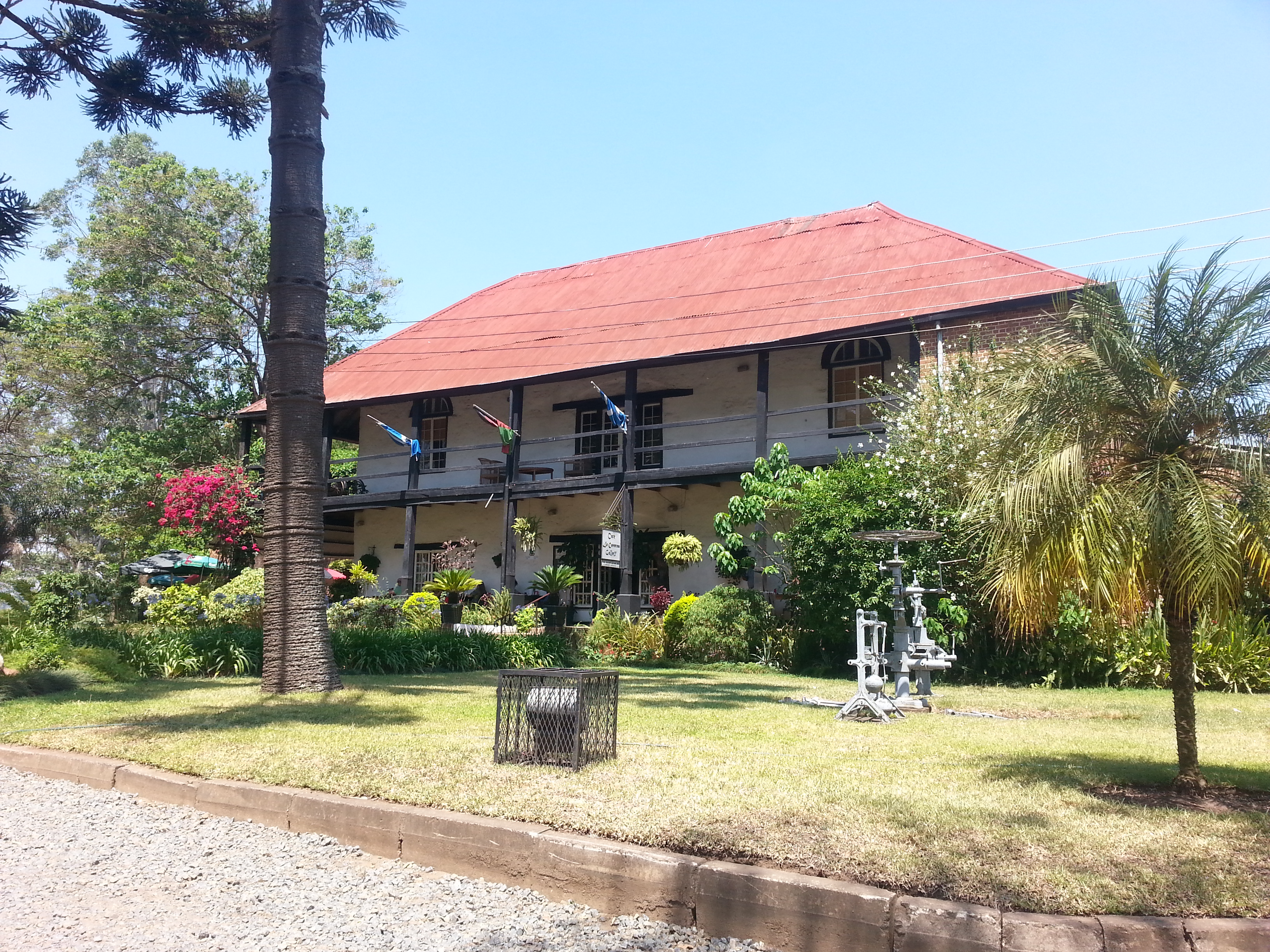
Mandala House, Blantyre's oldest building

Blantyre was founded in 1876 through the missionary work of the Church of Scotland. It was named after Blantyre, South Lanarkshire, Scotland, birthplace of the explorer David Livingstone. The site was chosen by British missionary Henry Henderson, who was joined there on 23 October 1876 by Dr T. T. Macklin and others. Dr Macklin took over the leadership of the mission and began the work of building; but it was not until 1878 that the first ordained minister, Rev. Duff MacDonald, joined the mission. The original missionaries, for various reasons, faced local opposition and three of them were recalled.

From 1881 to 1898, the mission was run by David Clement Scott, who built the St Michael and All Angels Church, Blantyre, between 1888 and 1891, but also for his Encyclopaedic Dictionary of the Mang'anja Language, the foremost dictionary for Mang'anja and the closely related Chichewa language. It was subsequently edited by Scott's successor in Blantyre, Alexander Hetherwick. The church was built by a team of local workmen with no knowledge of European architecture or building techniques.

Alongside the mission a commercial trading company was established. The Livingstonia Central Africa Trading Company, renamed the African Lakes Corporation in 1878, was founded in Glasgow in 1877. In 1881, it moved to Mandala, not far away on the other side of the River Mudi. The company's original base in Blantyre, Mandala House, still exists and is a National Monument and the oldest building in Malawi.

Blantyre became a British consular station in 1883 and attained municipality status by 1895, making it Malawi's oldest municipality. By the time of World War I, Blantyre had a diverse population with Africans from neighbouring districts as well as South Asian traders.

The city's status as Malawi's centre of commerce and industry began through its role as a centre for colonial trade in ivory. Blantyre established itself as a crossroads for trade in Southern Africa. The city became Malawi's main manufacturing centre for shoes, corn (maize) milling, brewing, soft drink production, baking, printing, and tobacco.

From 1876 to 1905, urban development in Blantyre was confined to three areas within 2 km of each other: Blantyre Mission, Mandala (European commercial venture), and the government zone and commercial centre triangle marked by Haile Selassie Road, Glyn Jones Road and Hannover Street. In Limbe development started in 1906 following the establishment of the Shire Highlands Railways Company headquarters and repair and servicing facilities and Imperial Tobacco Group (ITG) packaging and tobacco grading factory nearby. As a result of the establishment of these large operations, easy accessibility and flat topography, Limbe experienced a development boom of Indian wholesale and retail shops. By 1910 Limbe town surpassed Blantyre town. Low- and medium-density housing for the European and Asian staff was in Mpingwe, ITG and Mudi in Limbe and in Mount Pleasant, Sunnyside, Namiwawa, Kabula and Mandala in Blantyre. The Indian shops included accommodation at the rear or on the top floor. High-density housing for the African workforce was far away except the Chiwembe compound in Limbe.

The development history of Blantyre was principally dictated by piecemeal uncoordinated development as a result of individual and interest group decisions relating to evangelism, commerce, farming, industry and administration.

Urban development in Blantyre was further stimulated by the construction of the railway. In 1956 it was merged with its sister city, Limbe (11 km or 7 mi east, founded in 1909), to form one city.

Blantyre City has a total of eight National Monuments, mostly buildings of historic importance. The City Assembly has nominated two sites for designation as National Monuments and another 23 sites for investigation with regard to their eligibility for designation as national and local monuments.

== Demographics ==
=== Population growth ===
Historical population
Year	Pop.	±% p.a.
1977	222,153	—
1987	333,120	+4.13%
1998	502,053	+3.80%
2008	661,256	+2.79%
2018	800,264	+1.93%

=== Ethnic groups ===
Ethnic Groups in Blantyre City (2018 Census)
Ethnic Groups	percent
Lomwe	39.59%
Ngoni	19.12%
Yao	14.32%
Chewa	9.34%
Sena	5.74%
Mang'anja	4.26%
Tumbuka	4.01%
Tonga	1.24%
Nyanja	0.87%
Nkhonde	0.34%
Lambya	0.2%
Sukwa	0.02%
Other	0.93%

According to the 2018 census, the Lomwe are the largest ethnic group in the city with 39.59% of the population. The largest ethnic minority are the Ngoni with 19.12% of the population. Other minor ethnic groups include the Yao with 14.32%, Chewa

9.34%, Sena with 5.74%, Mang'anja with 4.26%, Tumbuka with 4.01%, Tonga with 1.24%, Nyanja with 0.87%, Nkhonde with 0.34%, Lambya with 0.2%, Sukwa with only 0.02%, and other ethnic groups with 0.93% of the city's population.

=== Religion ===
Religions in Blantyre City (2018 Census)
1. Roman Catholic (17.9%)
2. Church of Central African Presbyterian (17.6%)
3. Seventh-day Adventist/Baptist/Apostolic (15.4%)
4. Pentecostal (9.75%)
5. Anglican (1.70%)
6. Other Christian (24.3%)
7. Muslim (10.1%)
8. Traditional (0.08%)
9. Other (2.41%)
10. No Religion (0.63%)

The largest religious denomination in Blantyre City is Catholicism with 17.94% of the city. The largest religious minority is Church of Central Africa Presbyterian with 17.61%. Other minority religions include Seventh-day Adventist, Baptist, and Apostolic with 15.44% combined, Pentecostal with 9.75%, Anglican with 1.7%, other Christian with 24.33%, Islam with 10.11%, Traditional with only 0.08%, other religions with 2.41%, and no religion with 0.63% of the city.

== Geography ==
Blantyre City, the largest commercial and industrial capital of Malawi, is in the Shire Highlands and geographical centre of the Southern Region of the country and lies 35° east of Greenwich Meridian and 15° 42' south of the Equator. It is a transport communications node with road, rail and air links to all parts of the country and neighbouring countries of Mozambique, Zimbabwe, South Africa, Zambia and Tanzania. It covers an area of 228 km^{2}. The city is classified as a 'National Urban Centre' within the designated six hierarchical levels system of urban centres of the country and is the regional administrative headquarters of the Southern Region.

The geology of the city consists of two principal types of rocks of an ancient Basement Complex, a result of a process that took place during the late Pre-Cambrian period about 500 million years ago. The most extensive rock formation consists of pyroxene granulite gneiss that covers more than 50% of the city area, from the northwest to the east and extends in two small bands southward in the western part of the city. Syenitic gneiss accounts for about 40% covering the southern, western and north-eastern corner of the city and also in form of scattered small intrusions into the pyroxene granulite gneiss. In their unweathered state, both rock types are impervious hence poor aquifers, but they provide a valuable resource for road and building construction. Blantyre City is on the eastern edge of the southern branch of the Eastern African Rift, and thus some prominent faults occur within and in the vicinity of the city rendering it prone to earthquakes. The main faults and associated zones of deeply fractured bedrock run from the north of the city in a southwesterly direction and are potential aquifers for groundwater.

Blantyre City lies in a hilly area; it has varied topography ranging from an elevation of about 780 to 1,612 metres above sea level. There are three main types of topographical features, which have major implications for the development of the city: the hills, plateau and ridge, and the natural drainage system.

The most conspicuous and dominant physical features are the numerous hills found in all parts of the city. The main hills are the headwaters of several rivers and streams that originate and radiate from the city, forming a natural drainage system with nine distinct catchment areas: Likhubula, Lunzu, Mombezi and Khombwi, which drain the northern part of the city, and Mudi, Chisombezi, Limbe, Luchenza and Mwampanzi draining the middle and southern parts. Because of the hilly topography, these natural drainage channels are narrow and have steep sides and gradients.

The plateau and ridge comprises all the land that is suitable for urban development including extensive relatively flat land, the mountain piedmonts and plains, and long narrow watersheds and strips of land that separate the rivers and streams.

Its rather unconventional location has meant that Blantyre is surrounded by Mount Soche, Ndirande mountain, Chiradzulu mountain and Michiru Mountain, which constitute the Michiru Mountain Conservation Area.

=== Climate ===
The climate of Blantyre is classified by Köppen-Geiger climate classification system as a Tropical climate, more specifically a tropical savanna climate (Aw) and is greatly influenced by its location in the tropical zone and altitude. The city experiences the tropical continental climate with two distinct seasons in the year (three proper seasons). The rainy season is from November to April, with continuing light cold showers locally known as chiperoni from the end of May to July. The dry season is from May to October. The mean annual rainfall is 1,122 mm (44.17 in), of which about 80% falls within 3 1/2 months between November and March.

The city is generally cool with mean monthly temperatures ranging from 19 °C (66 °F) during the cool season (May to July) to 26 °C (79 °F) during the hot season (September to November). There are two particularly uncomfortable spells of weather; the hottest season associated with high humidity soon before the onset of the first rains (end October to November), and the frost along rivers, mist and chilly showers and winds characteristic of the cold season in June and July.

Climate data for Blantyre (Chileka International Airport) 1961–1990, extremes 1939–present
Month	Jan	Feb	Mar	Apr	May	Jun	Jul	Aug	Sep	Oct	Nov	Dec	Year
Record high °C (°F)	36.7 (98.1)	37.4 (99.3)	38.3 (100.9)	33.8 (92.8)	33.7 (92.7)	31.7 (89.1)	38.0 (100.4)	33.3 (91.9)	38.6 (101.5)	39.5 (103.1)	39.5 (103.1)	36.5 (97.7)	39.5 (103.1)
Mean daily maximum °C (°F)	28.4 (83.1)	28.3 (82.9)	27.8 (82.0)	27.2 (81.0)	25.9 (78.6)	24.1 (75.4)	23.9 (75.0)	26.1 (79.0)	29.2 (84.6)	31.3 (88.3)	30.7 (87.3)	29.2 (84.6)	27.7 (81.9)
Daily mean °C (°F)	23.5 (74.3)	23.4 (74.1)	23.2 (73.8)	22.2 (72.0)	20.3 (68.5)	18.5 (65.3)	18.4 (65.1)	20.0 (68.0)	23.1 (73.6)	25.0 (77.0)	25.0 (77.0)	24.0 (75.2)	22.2 (72.0)
Mean daily minimum °C (°F)	20.1 (68.2)	19.9 (67.8)	19.3 (66.7)	17.9 (64.2)	15.6 (60.1)	13.6 (56.5)	13.3 (55.9)	14.5 (58.1)	17.1 (62.8)	19.5 (67.1)	20.3 (68.5)	20.2 (68.4)	17.6 (63.7)
Record low °C (°F)	10.2 (50.4)	14.0 (57.2)	15.8 (60.4)	9.6 (49.3)	9.1 (48.4)	6.0 (42.8)	9.0 (48.2)	10.0 (50.0)	7.6 (45.7)	9.5 (49.1)	11.6 (52.9)	14.0 (57.2)	6.0 (42.8)
Average precipitation mm (inches)	198.0 (7.80)	181.4 (7.14)	152.0 (5.98)	45.9 (1.81)	9.9 (0.39)	2.1 (0.08)	2.4 (0.09)	1.2 (0.05)	3.5 (0.14)	29.2 (1.15)	93.0 (3.66)	178.0 (7.01)	896.6 (35.30)
Average precipitation days (≥ 0.3 mm)	16	14	12	6	2	2	2	1	2	4	8	14	83
Average relative humidity (%)	79	80	78	75	69	66	64	50	52	53	61	75	67
Mean monthly sunshine hours	198.4	182.0	217.0	237.0	260.4	237.0	232.3	260.4	270.0	275.9	228.0	198.4	2,797
Mean daily sunshine hours	6.4	6.5	7.0	7.9	8.4	7.9	7.5	8.4	9.0	8.9	7.6	6.4	7.7
Source 1: NOAA
Source 2: Meteo Climat (record highs and lows)

== Economy ==
Blantyre City is the commercial and industrial capital. It is by far the major employment generator in the country and has the greatest multiplier effect on the urban economy. The city is Malawi's industrial centre with many manufacturing plants, having eight designated industrial areas: Makata, Ginnery Corner, Maselema, Limbe, Chirimba, South Lunzu, Maone and Chitawira. Of these Makata, Ginnery Corner, Maselema, Limbe, Chirimba and Maone are actively hosting industries whilst South Lunzu is yet to be developed.

The existing industrial sites are further categorised into heavy and light sites. Makata and Limbe, for example, are the sole heavy industrial sites hosting more than 30 companies.

While Chirimba industrial area is designated a heavy industrial area, it is the least developed in terms of number of industries. Apart from Makata, Ginnery corner industrial site is another active site followed by Limbe and Maselema. The least are Chirimba and Maone industrial sites. Chitawira and Maselema are classic examples of light industrial areas. All the industrial areas are located along the banks of the main rivers or streams of Blantyre city. Makata industrial area lies between Mudi and Nasolo streams whilst Ginnery Corner industrial area is along Mudi River. Maselema industrial area exists along the Naperi river and Chirimba stream hosts Chirimba industrial area.

There are several rules for treatment of wastes in the industries, but disposal of untreated wastewater into drains and, subsequently, into the city's major streams is very common, thus posing a potential health and environmental risk to the people in Blantyre and downstream. Other sources of water pollution in the city such as run-offs from domestic and agricultural activities and vehicle emissions have been identified. Previous studies have indicated substantial heavy metal pollution in the city's water bodies including streams. Major changes in industrial activities have occurred in the city including a decrease in volumes of wastewater generated by the David Whitehead company, which used to be a major contributor of wastewater effluent in Makata industrial area; change of ownership and wastewater management of Cold Storage Company; closure of the Shire Bus Line; doubling of wastewater generation from both Carlsberg and Chibuku Products due to increase in production and installation of some industrial pre-treatment plants such as at Chibuku, Plascon and Dulux.

Manufacturing contributes approximately 14% to GDP. In the period 1996–1999 the sector showed 0% growth, partly due to the rapid liberalisation of markets exposing Malawi's manufacturers to competition from South Africa and Zimbabwe. The sector is still hampered by monopolistic behaviour (cotton), trade barriers, lack of access to capital, illegal imports, and unpredictable implementation or lack of implementation of existing bilateral trade agreements.

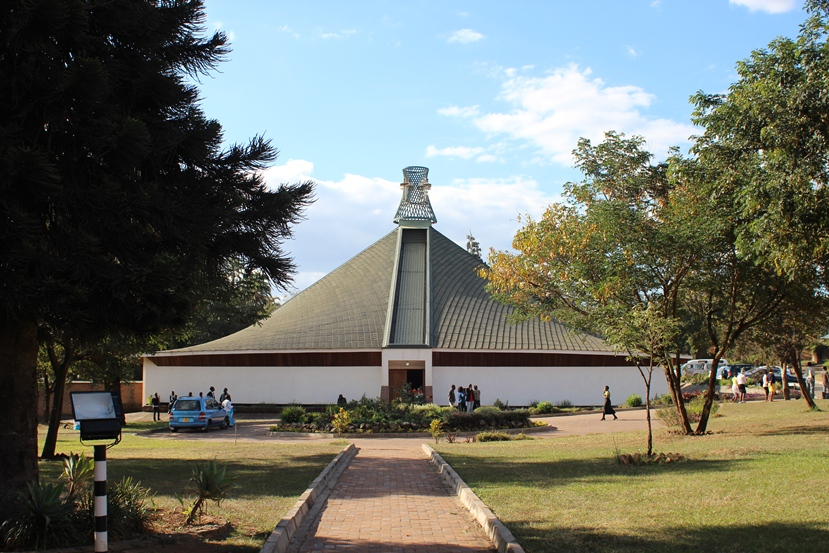
The modern Multi-purpose hall at the Blantyre Mission

The employment structure includes formal and informal sectors, together offering employment that is estimated to be between 50,000 and 55,000 jobs and absorbing 62% of the labour force. The formal sector employment consists of primary, secondary and tertiary industry sub-sectors, and the informal sector is principally small-scale business operations. The tertiary or services industry sub-sector is leading in terms of employment creation and importance to the economy of the city; it employs 26,074 people accounting for 56.5% of total formal employment. The secondary industry sub-sector employs 18,824 people principally in manufacturing and accounts for about 41% of the total employment. Information on informal sector activities is scanty or non-existent. But a recent study by Africon and field investigation under the Blantyre City Environmental City Profile, leads to the conclusion that it is a substantial and vibrant economy, offering employment to about 4,500 people who would otherwise be unemployed.

Blantyre is home to the Malawi Stock Exchange located on Victoria Avenue, the heart of the city. It opened its doors in November 1996 and operates under the Capital Market Development Act 1990 and the Companies Act 1984. Before the listing of the first company, the major activities that were being undertaken were the provision of a facility for secondary market trading in Government of Malawi bonds, namely Treasury Bills and Local Registered Stocks.

As Malawi's main economic and financial hub, the city plays host to an annual international trade fair usually held in May. The event seeks to showcase the best of Malawian commerce, industry, agriculture and information technology and opened under a theme of "Promoting Economic Transformation through Private Sector- Led Industrialization" in 2025.

According to the Mercer 2017 and Preciousgift Kulumbasi, Cost of Living Rankings, Blantyre is the city with the fifth-lowest cost of living for expatriates in the world.

== Sport facilities ==
Malawi's second-largest stadium, Kamuzu Stadium, which holds an estimated 40,000, is in Chichiri, Blantyre. Due to the age of the structure, however, it has been downsized to seat an estimated 25,000. International football games are played here as well as major Malawian events such as presidential inaugurations and Independence Day celebrations. Other sports centres are College of Medicine Sports Complex, Blantyre Youth Centre and the Chiwembe Sports Complex.

== Transport ==
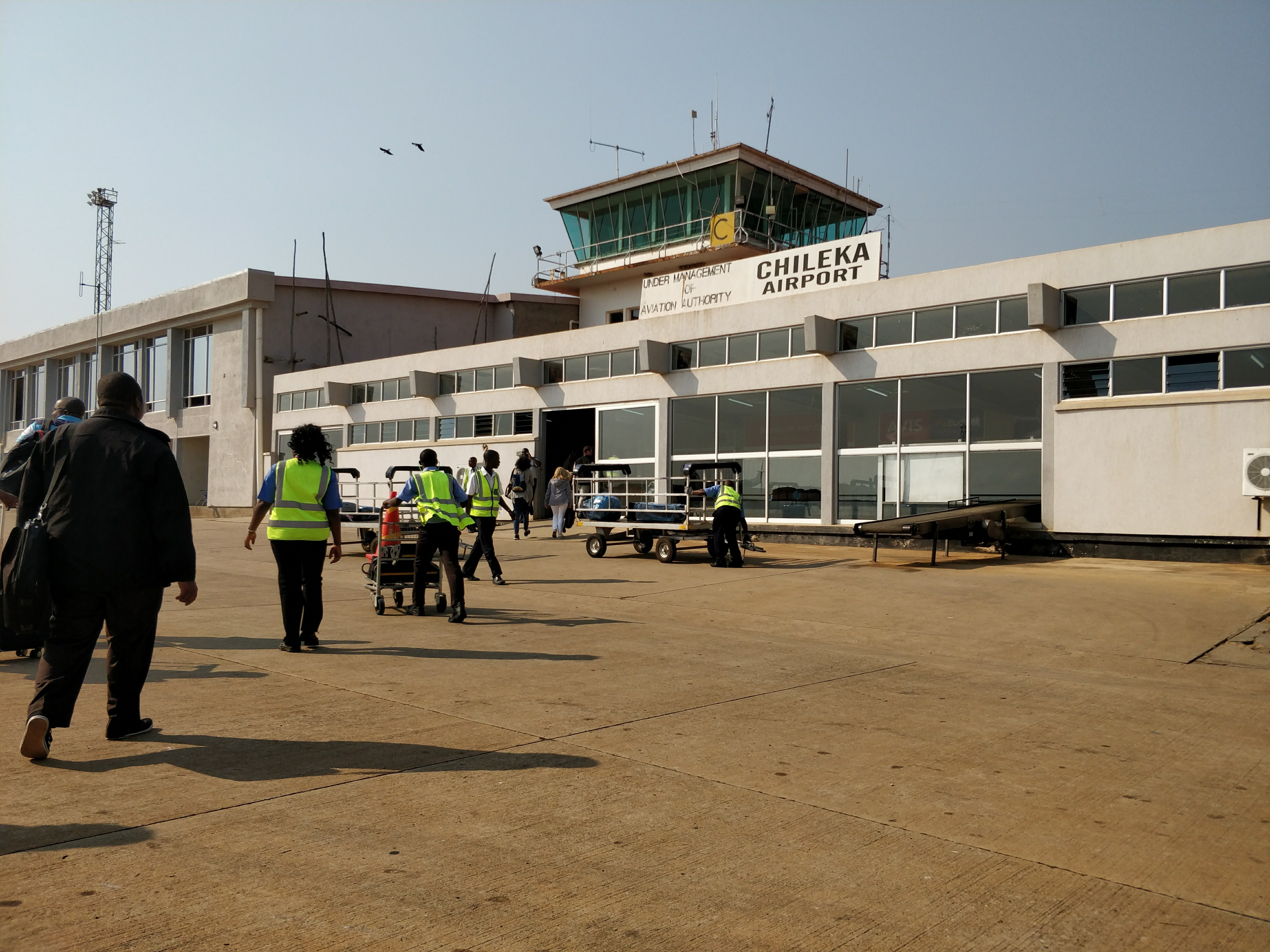
Chileka International Airport

The city has an important railway station on the Sena railway, which connects it by operating a connection between Blantyre to Nsanje, near the southern border with Mozambique, and connects Malawi with the Mozambican ports of Beira and Nacala; Mchinji, near the border with Zambia; Salima and Lilongwe; and between Nkaya and Nayuchi on the eastern border with Mozambique, covering a total of 797 kilometres (495 miles).

Chileka International Airport, located approximately 14 km (9 mi) from Blantyre city centre, has two runways and serves Blantyre with flights to South Africa, Tanzania, Ethiopia, Kenya, and domestic points. The airport is the second base for the country's flagship airline, Malawian Airlines. Chileka airport also houses important weather stations. In 2007, the Government of Malawi proposed expansion plans that are yet to be realised. In 2009 it was announced that the Government of Malawi was seeking partners for a $1 billion rehabilitation of the airport, which will include the construction of a new terminal building and the widening of the current runway.

The city has coach services that run from the city centre and Wenela bus station to Lilongwe, Mzuzu and other African cities including Johannesburg and Harare.

== Culture ==
The Mandala House is a historic building in Blantyre that was built in 1882 as a place of relaxation for the managers of the Mandala Trading Company. Inside there is a cafe, as well as the Society of Malawi Library and Archive. The Chichiri Museum is located in the city. Carlsberg Brewery is a location where visitors can try the country's favourite drink, the "Green". This drink was created by a Danish foreign minister who visited Malawi during the independence celebration in 1966.

== Places of worship ==
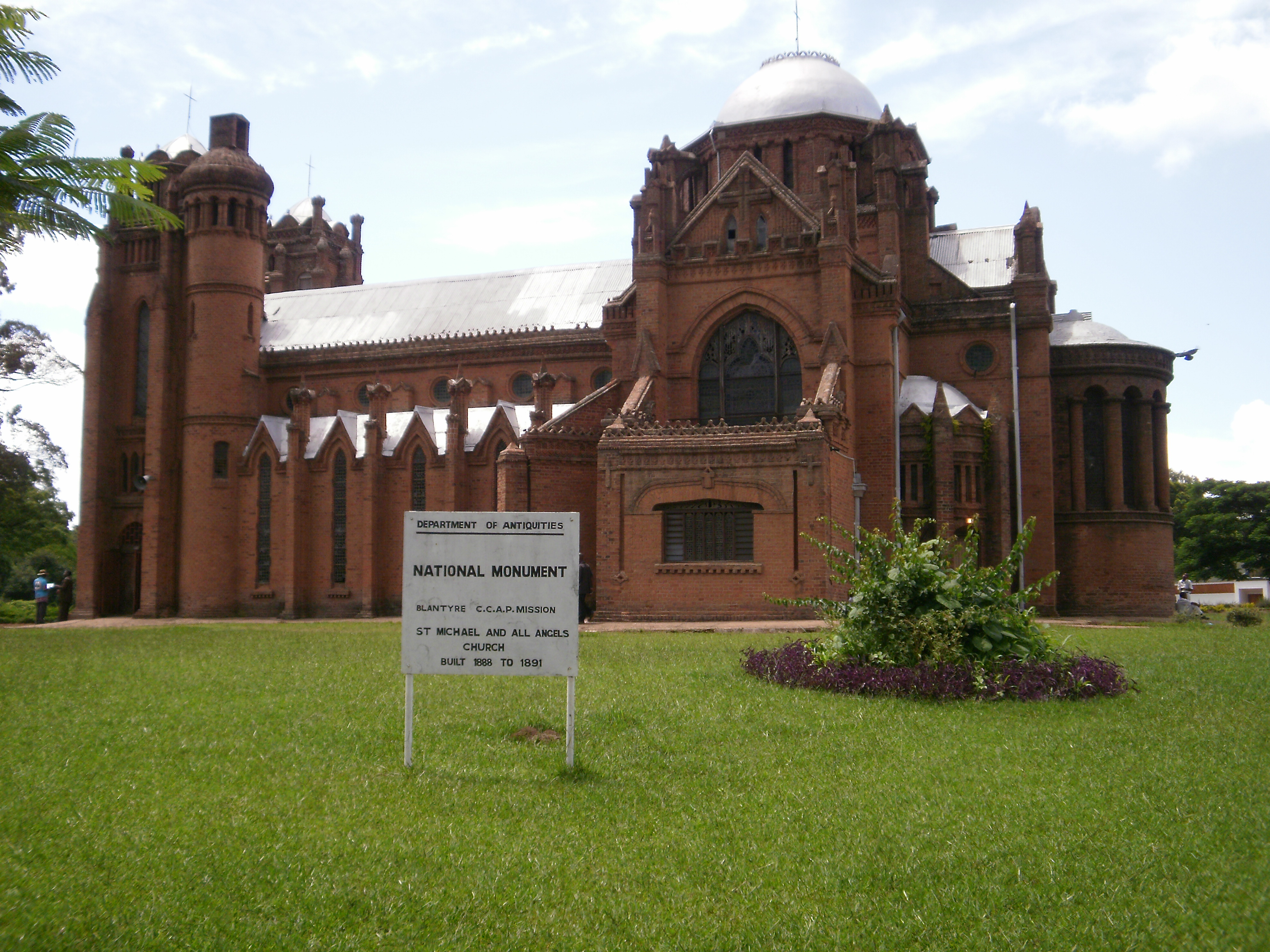
St Michael and All Angels Church, Church of Central Africa Presbyterian

Among the places of worship, they are predominantly Christian churches and temples: Lutheran Church of Central Africa (Lutheran World Federation), Church of Central Africa Presbyterian (World Communion of Reformed Churches), Baptist Convention of Malawi (Baptist World Alliance), Assemblies of God, Roman Catholic Archdiocese of Blantyre (Catholic Church). There are also Muslim mosques.

== Education ==
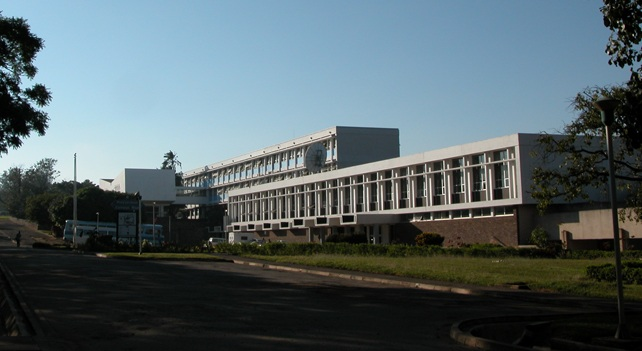
Malawi Polytechnic

Blantyre City has a wide range of educational facilities comprising primary school, secondary school and tertiary education as well as pre-school. These are provided by the government, City Assembly, missionary institutions and the private sector.

Tertiary education includes technical and higher learning institutions mostly in the Chichiri-Ginnery Corner area. The Malawi University of Science and Technology opened their City Campus here in 2024 and the former Malawi Polytechnic now Malawi University of Business and Applied Sciences (MUBAS), Kamuzu University of Health Sciences, Blantyre School of Health Sciences and Malawi College of Accountancy, Telecommunications National and SADCC Multi-Country Training Schools, Technical School, Police Training School and Blantyre Teachers' College.

Schools include Bedir International School, Saint Andrews International Primary and Saint Andrews International High School, Central High School, Nyasa Junior Academy, St Patrick's Primary School, St Patrick's Academy, South End Secondary School, Phoenix Primary School, Hillview International Primary School in Limbe and Kalibu Academy.

== Health ==
The health care delivery system in the city has both curative and preventative health care services, and this is provided through a network of hospitals and health centres/clinics that are distributed throughout different parts of the city. The government runs Queen Elizabeth Central Hospital (QECH), the biggest referral hospital in the country, which has a total of 1,000 hospital beds, and the three private hospitals that have a total of 122 hospital beds. The 18 public clinics are run by the District Health Office in partnership with the Blantyre City Assembly and service Bangwe, Chigumula, Chilomoni, Chirimba, Limbe, Ndirande, Manyowe, Masala, Mapanga, Misesa, Mzedi, Nancholi, Nkolokoti, Ntenje, Ntonda, South Lunzu, Zingwangwa and Civic Centre.

There are several clinics run by religious organisations where people receive paying health care services, and there are also clinics owned by statutory corporations/companies (serving their staff) such as ADMARC, Malawi Railways, Portland Cement, Lever Brothers, Tobacco Processors, and National Seed Company of Malawi. Following the liberalisation policy, the city has witnessed the establishment of many private clinics and hospitals (including Blantyre Adventist Hospital and Mwaiwathu PVT Hospital) that complement the few limited old facilities. The majority of these offer outpatient services while the few well-established ones offer both. Besides the city-based health services, many city residents make regular use of mission hospitals that are outside the city to the extent that these form part of the city's health delivery system (Mlambe Hospital and Nguludi). In addition, traditional healers (herbalists) and traditional birth attendants play an important role in providing health care to the city residents.

The health delivery system of the city is grossly inadequate. The public hospital wards are very congested and long queues are characteristic of outpatient services.

Mwaiwathu Private Hospital and Blantyre Adventist Hospital provide the best medical services in the city, with many residents of Lilongwe travelling to Blantyre to receive treatment from them. There is also the Beit CURE International Hospital, one of the very few hospitals where hip and knee replacement surgery can be done in Sub-Saharan Africa.

== Twin towns – sister cities ==
Blantyre is twinned with:

- Hanover in Germany
- Kaohsiung in Taiwan
- Norfolk, Nebraska in the United States

== Notable people from Blantyre ==
- Cate and Bronte Campbell, Olympic swimmers for Australia
- Anthea Stewart, Olympic field hockey player for Zimbabwe
- Isaac Chilemba, professional boxer and former IBO and WBC-International champion
- Kay Chiromo, Malawian artist and illustrator
- Vera Kamtukule, Malawian author, writer, activist and politician
- Ceciwa Khonje, activist, broadcaster and diplomat
- Mwai Kumwenda, international professional netball player
- Aubrey Mwasinga, pastor, founder of Raised For a Purpose Ministries
- James John Skinner QC, Chief Justice of Malawi from 1970 to 1985

== Bibliography ==
- Paul Tiyambe Zeleza; Dickson Eyoh, eds. (2003). "Blantyre, Malawi". Encyclopedia of Twentieth-Century African History. Routledge. ISBN 978-0-415-23479-5.
- Kevin Shillington, ed. (2005). "Blantyre". Encyclopedia of African History. Fitzroy Dearborn. ISBN 978-1-57958-245-6.
- Englund, Harri (2022). Visions for Racial Equality: David Clement Scott and the Struggle for Justice in Nineteenth-Century Malawi. Cambridge University Press. ISBN 9781316514009.
- Statham, Todd (2014). "Scott, David Clement". Dictionary of African Christian Biography.
- Lakudzala, D. D.; Tembo, K. C.; Manda, I. K. (2000). "An investigation of chemical pollutants in Lower Shire River, Malawi". Malawi Journal of Science and Technology. 5 (10). University of Malawi.
- Masamba, W. R. L.; Chimbalanga, R. M. (2001). "Heavy Metal Pollution in the City of Blantyre, Malawi: Lead, Zinc and Cadmium". The Proceedings of the First Chancellor College Research Dissemination Conference: Held at the Great Hall, Chancellor College, Zomba 28th to 30th March 2001. Sustainable Environmental Management and Conservation. Chancellor College research and publications committee. pp. 317–322.
- Sajidu, S.M.I.; Masamba, W.R.L.; Henry, E.M.T.; Kuyeli, S.M. (2007). "Water quality assessment in streams and wastewater treatment plants of Blantyre, Malawi". Physics and Chemistry of the Earth, Parts A/B/C. 32 (15–18): 1391–1398. Bibcode:2007PCE....32.1391S. doi:10.1016/j.pce.2007.07.045.
- Kaonga, M.L.; Coleman, K. (20 August 2008). "Modelling soil organic carbon turnover in improved fallows in eastern Zambia using the RothC-26.3 model". Forest Ecology and Management. 256 (5): 1160–1166. Bibcode:2008ForEM.256.1160K. doi:10.1016/j.foreco.2008.06.017.
