= Mulanje Mountain Forest Reserve =

Malawian nature reserve

Coordinates: 15.9167°S 35.5694°E

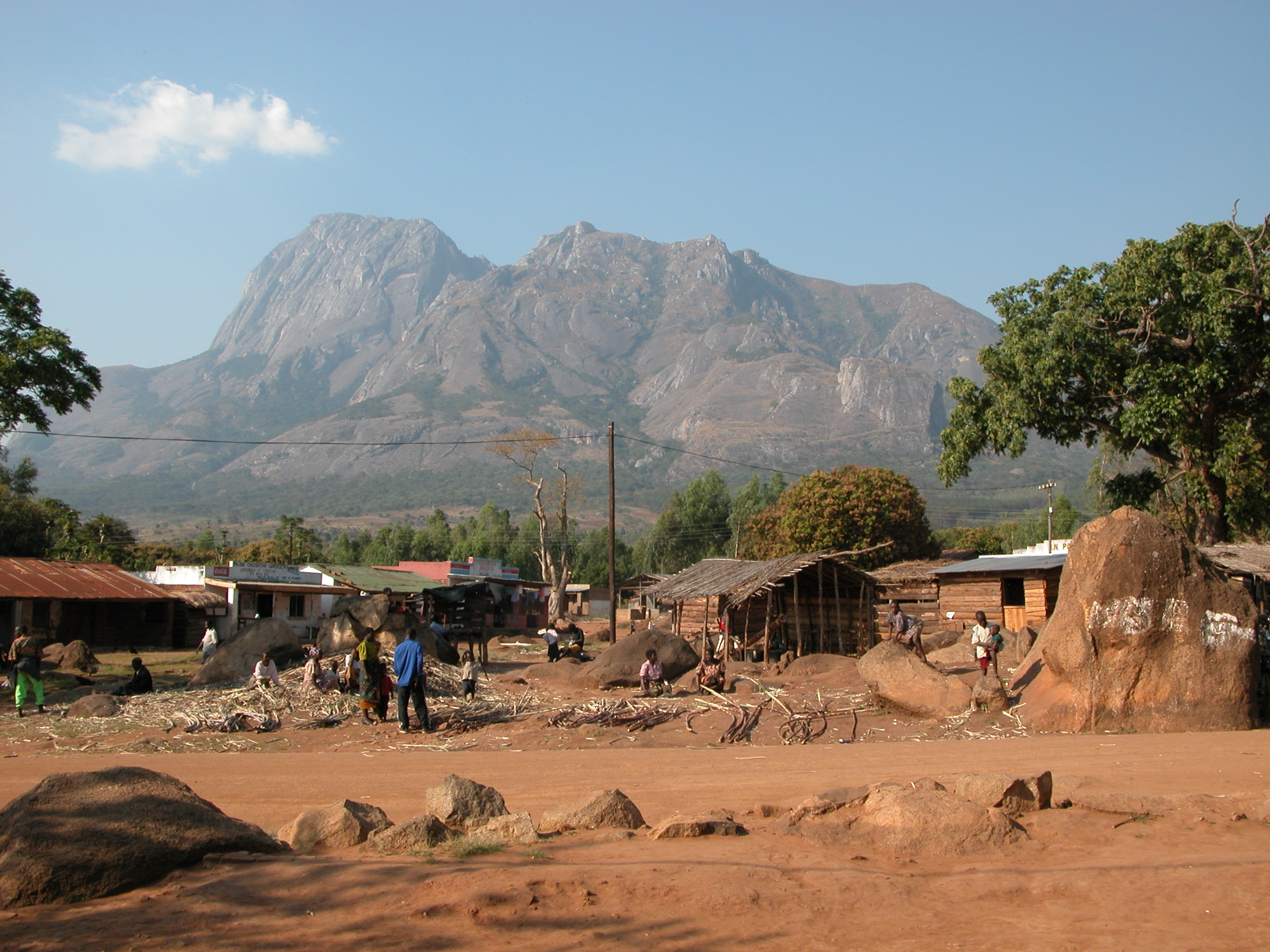
- Mulanje Mountain
- Formation: 1927
- Headquarters: Malawi
- Website: https://mountmulanje.org.mw/mount-mulanje/

Mulanje Mountain Forest Reserve is a nature reserve founded in 1927 in Malawi. The reserve covers 56,317 hectares. It is operated by the Mulanje Mountain Conservation Trust. The reserve was designated a biosphere reserve by UNESCO in 2000.

== Geography ==
Mulanje Massif rises abruptly from the plains to a high plateau at 1800-1900m, surmounted by rocky peaks. Sapitwa Peak is the highest peak on the plateau and the highest peak in Malawi, with an altitude of 3002m above sea level. It is surrounded by densely populated plains situated at 600m-700m above sea level.

The mountain is composed of syenite, quartz-syenite and granite rock materials. This forms a massif of approximately 500 km^{2}.

The structure and altitude of the mountain create unique climate for the area, which is characterised by high rainfall from November to April. Moisture-laden Chiperoni winds from the Indian Ocean cool and condense as they climb the mountain's southern slopes, creating fogs that nourish lush forests and tea plantations. This climate favours the development of unique ecology of rare and endemic life forms which contribute to the massif's high biodiversity.

== Fauna and flora ==
Mulanje Massif is an enclave of Afromontane flora and fauna, which occupies Africa's high altitude areas and is distinctive from the neighboring lowlands. Mulanje is home so many threatened and endangered species, and some endemic ones. The endemic tree Widdringtonia whytei, known as Mulanje Cedar or Mulanje Cypress, has been so heavily logged that it is considered endangered and the park contains the last remaining stands of this tree. Distinctive highland birds include the Thyolo alethe (Chamaetylas choloensis) and White-winged Apalis(Apalis chariessa). Other distinctive species include the limbless burrowing skink Melanoceps ater and Ruo River Screeching Frog (Arthroleptis francei), and the endemic Mount Mulanje Pygmy Chameleon (Rhampholeon platyceps) and Mulanje Chameleon (Nadzikambia mlanjensis).

The land around the park is threatened by growing population, land use patterns such as forest clearing for farming and firewood, and invasive species such as Mexican Pine (Pinus patula) and Himalayan raspberry (Rubus ellipticus).
