= Mulanje Massif =

Mountain in Malawi

Mount Mulanje
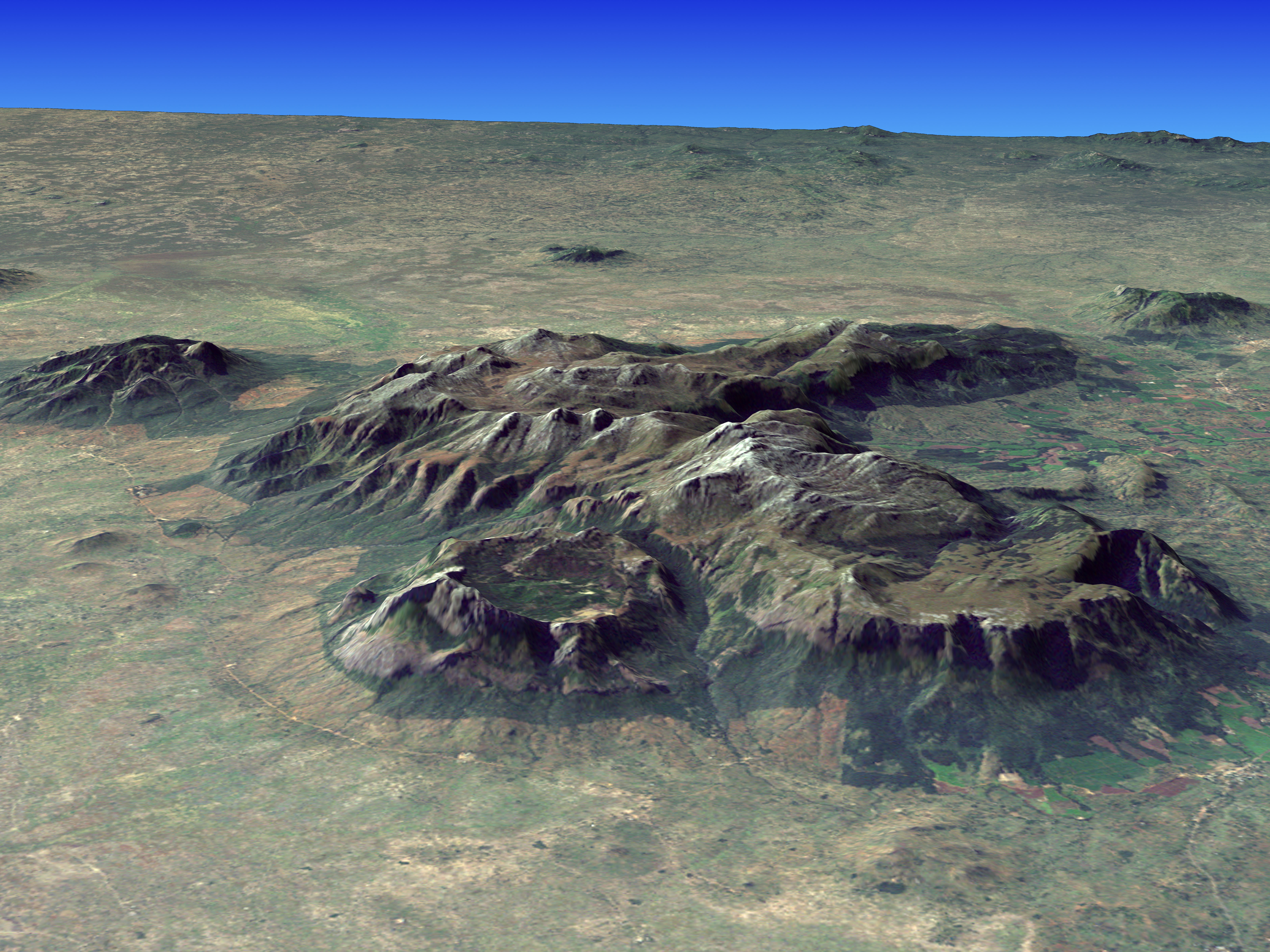
- Composite satellite image of Mt. Mulanje

Highest point
- Elevation: 3,002 m (9,849 ft)
- Prominence: 2,323 m (7,621 ft)
- Isolation: 1,272 km (790 mi)
- Listing: Country high point Ultra; Ribu
- Coordinates: 15°56′59″S 35°35′37″E

Geography
- Location within Malawi
- Location: Malawi

Geology
- Mountain type: Inselberg

UNESCO World Heritage Site
- Official name: Mount Mulanje Cultural Landscape
- Criteria: Cultural: (iii)(iv)
- Reference: 1201rev
- Inscription: 2025 (47th Session)

The Mulanje Massif, also known as Mount Mulanje, is a large inselberg and World Heritage Site in southern Malawi. Sapitwa Peak, the highest point on the massif at 3,002 m, is the highest point in Malawi. It lies 65 km east of Blantyre, rising sharply from the surrounding plains of Phalombe and the Mulanje district. It forms part of a proposed ecoregion, to be called the South East Africa Montane Archipelago (SEAMA).

== Geography ==
Much of the massif consists of rolling grassland at elevations of 1,800–2,200 m, intersected by deep forested ravines. It has many individual peaks reaching heights of over 2,500 m, including Chambe Peak, the West Face of which is the longest rock climb in Africa.

The massif was formed by the intrusion of magma into the Earth's crust about 130 million years ago. The surrounding rock eroded away over time, leaving behind the erosion-resistant igneous rock of the Mulanje Massif. The first European to report seeing the massif was David Livingstone in 1859, but archeological investigation reveals evidence of human visits to the massif from the Stone Age onwards. The elevation of the mountain is high enough for it to disturb upper level air flow and induce rain clouds to form around it, making it an important source of rain water at the head of almost every river that runs through this part of Malawi.

The forested slopes of the massif support a sizeable timber industry. At one time there was a cableway to transport timber from the edge of the plateau down to the Likhubula Forestry Station but it fell into disrepair and currently planks are carried down manually.

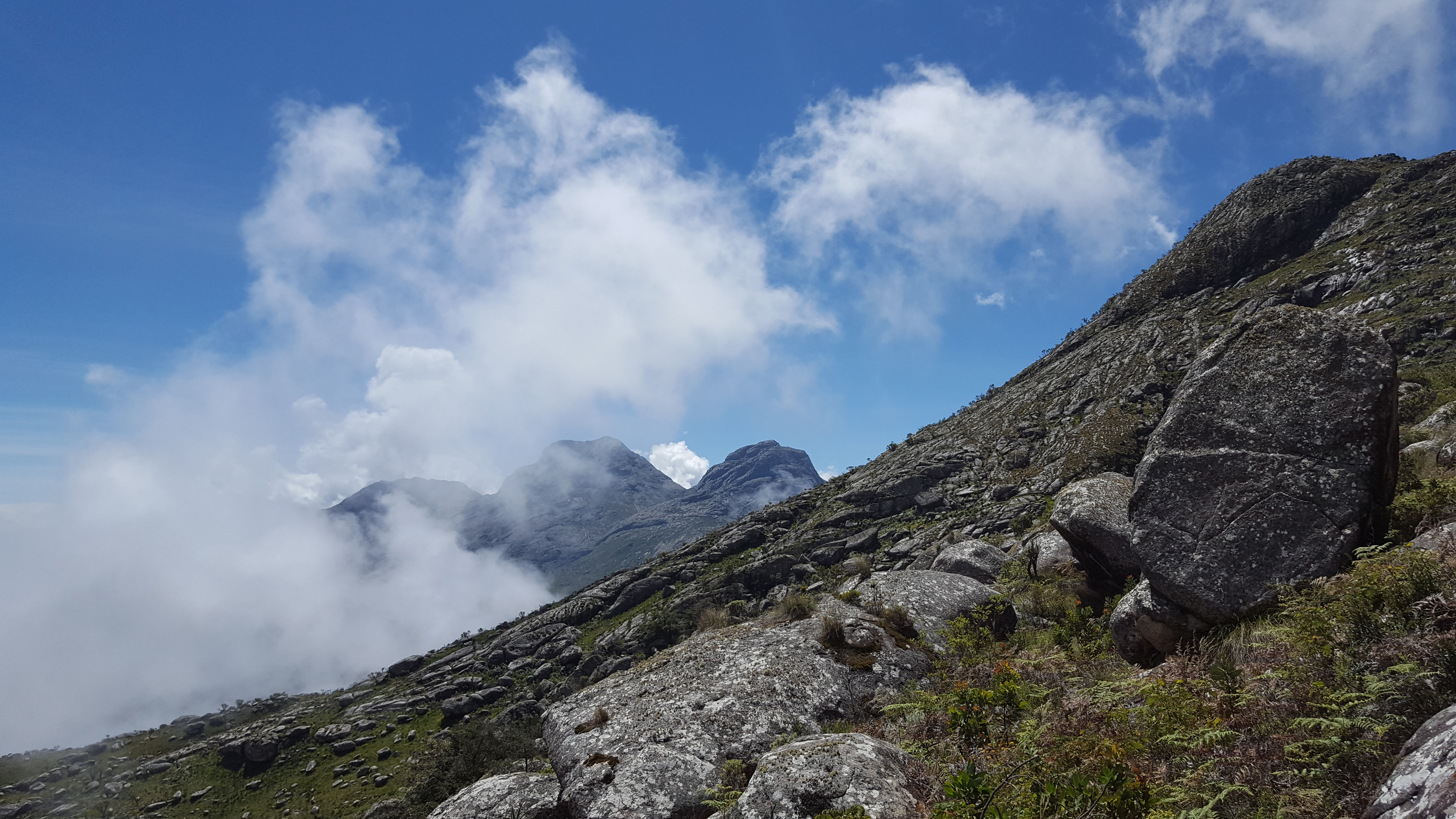
Sapitwa Peak in 2019

The mountain itself is part of the protected Mulanje Mountain Forest Reserve. The native Mulanje cypress (Widdringtonia whytei) has been so heavily logged that it is considered endangered and the park contains the last remaining stands of this tree, as well as a number of other plant and animal species—many of them endemic to the area. Examples include forest butterflies, birds such as the cholo alethe and white-winged apalis, a dwarf chameleon, geckos, skinks, the squeaker frog, and a rare limbless burrowing skink species. The land around the park is threatened by growing population, land use patterns such as forest clearing for farming and firewood, and invasive species such as golden Himalayan raspberry (Rubus ellipticus) and Mexican weeping pine (Pinus patula).

The massif is popular for hiking and climbing, and has several mountain huts scattered across it which are maintained by the Malawi Mountain Club and the Malawi Forestry Department. Sapitwa peak was first climbed in 1894, and is now the most popular climb on the plateau.

In 2014 the site was unsuccessfully nominated for World Heritage Status. In 2025, it was finally designated as a World Heritage Site by UNESCO.

== The human history of the Mulanje Area ==
According to Chewa legend, the people living in Malawi before their arrival were the Akafula.

Although yet to be found on Mulanje, rock art has been discovered on the nearby hills at Machemba and Mikolongwe. Recent work by the Catholic University has unearthed tool-making sites along the Thuchila shelf dating back to the Middle Stone Age, some 100,000 years ago.

The main Bantu immigration came from the Congo Basin in the 1600s, with the Mang'anja people settling in a number of sites around the Mulanje Area. These were peaceful people who built a livelihood from the soil and local natural resources. There was contact with the outside world through the coastal Arabs and Portuguese, and Yao traders who brought in goods to exchange for ivory and slaves.

The peacefulness came to an end with the migration of Yao people from the north-east towards the south shore of Lake Malawi (then Lake Nyasa) and highland areas of Malawi in the 1800s, escaping from their own internal tribal strife. With the strong coastal demand, slave raiding into the Mang'anja villages sharply increased and the settlements were often scattered. This situation was noted by David Livingstone when he travelled into this area in the middle of the nineteenth century.

Livingstone's call for help in ending the slave trade brought Scottish missionaries and settlers into the area who established themselves by setting up a mission on the slopes of the mountain and in estate agriculture, respectively. Despite attempts at developing an amicable relationship, conflict with the Yao increased and this soon led to violence. By the 1890s, the British had seen the need to establish a protectorate and they set up a military administration at the north of the mountain at Fort Lister and to the south at Fort Anderson. The staffing of these forts with Indian soldiers started Malawi's now longstanding links with the Indian sub-continent.

From this time, there were also inward migrations of the Lomwe people from the Portuguese east, escaping both colonial and Yao strife, who largely settled among the European estates and the Catholic missions. This immigration has continued to recent times during the Mozambican independence and civil wars.

Today, these three tribal cultures continue to live around the Mountain in one of the highest rural population densities in Africa. Although there is territorial distinction through their tribal traditional authorities, there is a widespread intermixing of the peoples.

European settlement flourished to develop the extensive tea estates that represent the first significant cultivation of this crop outside its countries of origin. The missions also continue to expand their services in education and primary health care.

== Climate ==
Mulanje Massif 3D

The climate of the larger Mulanje area is strongly influenced by the equatorial low pressure area, where the north-east trades of the Northern Hemisphere converge with the south-east trades of the Southern Hemisphere. This area is known as the Inter-Tropical Convergence Zone (ITCZ). On satellite Images the ITCZ is mostly seen as a long band of clouds in the Equatorial region, the main effect of the ITCZ is the creation of dry and rainy seasons in the Equatorial area.

The Mulanje Massif, because its unique position as a "mountain island" rising more than 2,500 metres above the surrounding plains, is strongly affected by the ITCZ, acting as a rain barrier. This becomes very visible when comparing the annual normal rainfalls, on and around the massif. The plateau level, at around 2,000 metres above sea level, annually experiences more than 2500 mm (100 inches) of rain, however, in the low plains around the foot of the massif, the annual rainfalls range around 40 inches. In the plains around the mountain it normally only rains in the rainy season, while it rains year round on the plateau level.

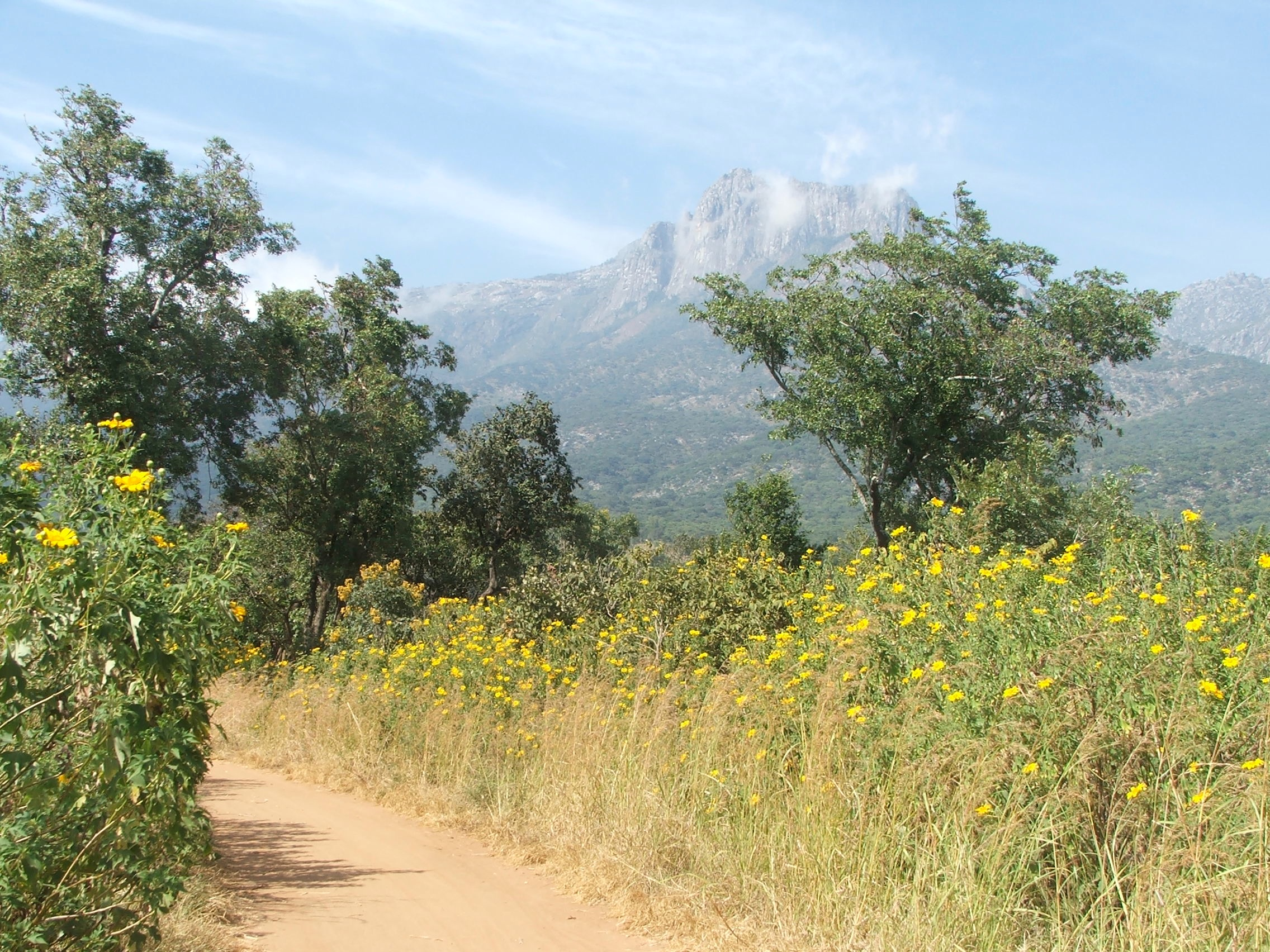
Mount Mulanje in the distance, seen from a pathway.

There are still differences in the amounts of rain around the massif. The south-west face of the mountain around Likhubula, Lichenya and Mulanje Boma is the windward side. This experiences the highest amounts of rain due to the south-east trades of the southern hemisphere that drive the moist air from Zambia and the Democratic Republic of the Congo into the Mulanje region. The north-west face of the massif experiences lesser rains, due to a rain-shadow effect.

The months of the dry season (May–August) are the coolest months of the year and most suitable for hiking in the massif. The wet season (November–April) is not recommended for hiking in the massif, as the hiker faces heavy rains on the plateau and high temperatures during the ascent.

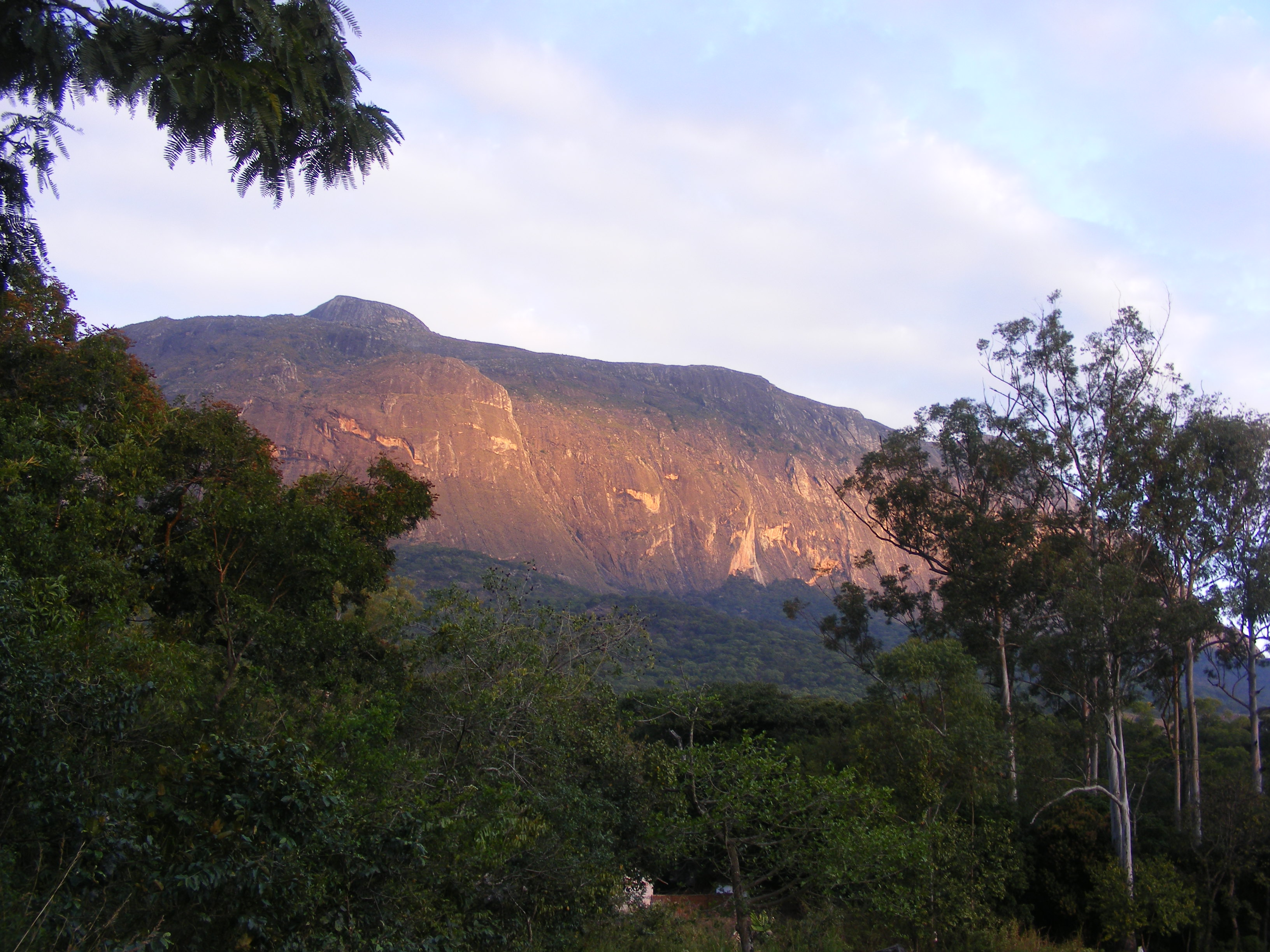
Western side of Mulanje Mountain in Sunset, seen from Likhubula Falls

Snow is a very rare event. Brief snowfalls are possible but the last major snowfall with ground accumulation was in June 1954.

== The Mulanje cedar ==
The Mulanje cedar (Widdringtonia whytei) was proclaimed the National Tree of Malawi in 1984 by the late president Hastings Banda. This tall tree, W. whytei, was named after Alexander Whyte, a colonial government botanist in Nyasaland. The species was first described in 1894 and it is only found on Mount Mulanje (and Mchese Mountain, depending on if that population is considered conspecific). Scientists disagree about whether this is a distinct species or a giant form of the other cedar found on the mountain, W. nodiflora, which is common across Southern Africa. The cedar forests on Mulanje were estimated in 2004 to have been reduced to a total area of 8.5 km^{2}, half of the estimated original forest cover. This area may have been diminished as a result of continued illegal cutting.

W. whytei is a large evergreen tree, growing up to 40–50 m tall, whereas W. nodiflora is more rounded, with a lower canopy height. On the mountain, the Mulanje cedar is limited to altitudes between 1,800-2,550 m and is normally confined to hollows and valleys where there is some protection from fire.

Cedar timber is pale red, straight grained and pleasantly fragrant. Its major qualities are that it is worked easily and is extremely durable, being naturally resistant to attacks from termites, wood-boring insects and fungi. The sap is poisonous to insects. For these reasons, the timber achieved commercial significance from the 1940s onward, as described by Laurens van der Post in his book Venture to the Interior, becoming a principal resource for building and woodworking. As of 2010 the timber is most used in the making of local arts and crafts, fishing boats for Lake Malawi, and in the construction and decoration of many prestigious buildings.

As the demand for its timber is high, the tree is under threat of extinction. Mulanje cedar is a pioneer species, not a climax species, meaning that it is good at taking advantage of sites that become free of other competing species but it is less successful in open competition. When fire destroys the trees in an area of woodland, Mulanje cedar will normally be the first tree species to re-establish itself. Other species will come in later, but because the cedar is relatively fast growing, it will not face much competition for sunlight.

The Malawi Department of Forestry is responsible for protecting the cedar forests from damaging fires. Each year, at the beginning of the dry season, firebreaks are cleared of vegetation to provide barriers that will impede the advance of wildfires. In addition, controlled early burning is carried out to reduce the build-up of combustible material that might cause intense and damaging fires later in the dry season. For further safety, gangs equipped with fire-fighting equipment are stationed on each of the main plateau areas whenever there is a fire hazard.

As well as providing protection from fires, the Department of Forestry is responsible for controlling the use of the trees for timber. In the past the department issued annual sawing licences but, due to a sharp increase in illegal harvesting, the sawing season has been closed since 2007. However, the illegal market for cedar is strong and cedar harvesting has not yet been stopped. All cedar wood sawn after 2007 is illegal wood, and can be confiscated by the Department of Forestry and the Malawi Police. In 2010 there was a significant increase in law-enforcement action involving armed forestry teams patrolling the cedar forests to stop the illegal pit sawyers.

There has also been a substantial planting programme to reforest Mulanje cedar seedlings in the plastic-covered greenhouses that can be seen across the mountain. In the 2008/09 rainy season, nurseries were established on the mountain to raise over 50,000 seedlings that were then planted out with an estimated survival rate of over 30%. In the 2009/10 season, nursery plans were to raise more than 20,000 seedlings, with an improved planting-out strategy to ensure an even higher success rate.

Conservation of the cedars is not secure. In 2010 the Mulanje Mountain Conservation Trust (MMCT) claimed the species would probably be extinct by 2020. Mulanje cedar was first assessed as 'endangered' in 1997, and again in 1998, by the International Union for Conservation of Nature (IUCN). It was re-assessed as 'critically endangered' by the IUCN in 2011, wherein the assessor, Aljos Farjon, based on the 2004 data, stated that the species would experience a population reduction of 80% by 2030. In 2019 it was again assessed as 'critically endangered', with the authors claiming that there were fewer than 50 mature trees left, and blaming this on foreign export. They make this claim based on the area being near the border, what they claim is bad policing by Malawi, and their claim that the wood is not used or sold in Malawi. Despite these assertions, the Malawi government and partners such as the MMCT have planted some 250,000 seedlings each year for the past few years as of 2019 (see previous paragraph). In addition to the risk of losing this tree, there is also the potential loss of the other endemic plant and animal species that inhabit these unique forests.

== Visiting Mulanje ==
Mulanje offers excellent hiking and climbing. The plateau is accessed in 3 to 6 hours by one of several trails. From the plateau, numerous peaks can be climbed. Several huts are maintained by the Mulanje Mountain Forest Reserve and the Mountain Club of Malawi and offer rustic accommodation to hikers and climbers. These include Sombani, Chinzama, Minunu, Tuchila, Chombe, Lychenya, and others. The highest peak, Sapitwa, is best accessed from the Chisepo hut.
