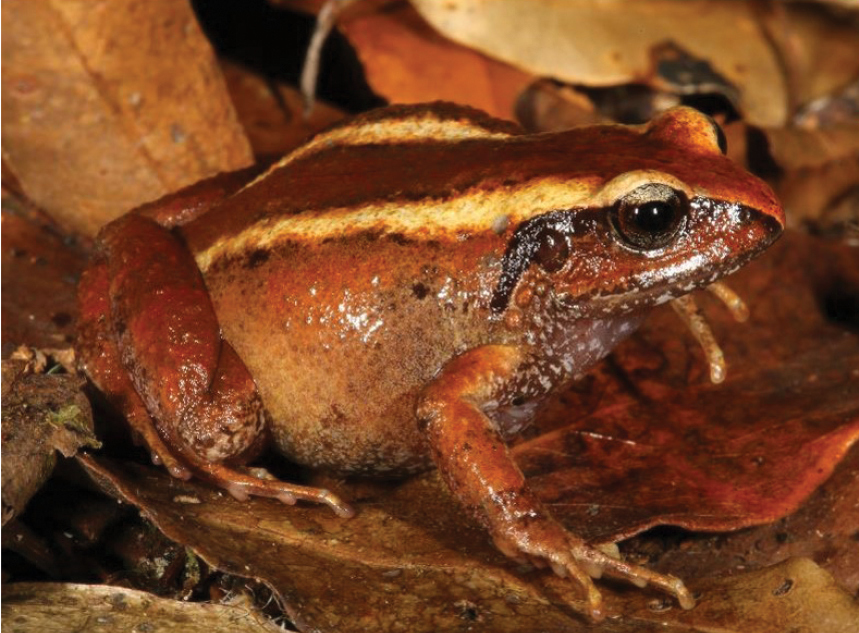

Conservation status
- Vulnerable (IUCN 3.1)

Scientific classification
- Kingdom: Animalia
- Phylum: Chordata
- Class: Amphibia
- Order: Anura
- Family: Arthroleptidae
- Genus: Arthroleptis
- Species: A. francei

Binomial name
- Arthroleptis francei Loveridge, 1953

Synonyms
- Arthroleptis adolfifriederici francei Loveridge, 1953

= Arthroleptis francei =

Species of frog

Arthroleptis francei is a species of frog in the family Arthroleptidae. It is found in Mount Mulanje in southern Malawi and in Mount Namuli and Mount Mabu in northern Mozambique. Records from the Zomba Massif (Malawi) require confirmation. Common names Ruo River screeching frog and France's squeaker have been coined for it.

== Etymology ==
The specific name francei honours Mr. F. H. France, young forestry officer who perished in trying to cross the Ruo River close to the type locality of this species. Arthur Loveridge named the species after France so that "his name may be linked with the forests he sought to preserve on the mountain he loved so well."

== Description ==
Males measure 25–30 mm (0.98–1.18 in) and females 29–43 mm (1.1–1.7 in) in snout–vent length. Loveridge reports slightly larger sizes for the same specimens, with maximum sizes of 32 and 46 mm (1.3 and 1.8 in) for males and females, respectively. The head is not wider than body. The tympanum is distinct and about half the diameter of the eye. The fingers and toes do not have webbing but their tips are swollen (only slightly so for the fingers). The dorsal colouration is dark brownish red. A deep black band edged with lighter above runs from the nostril, above the eye, and down to the forearm base. There is also a crossbar running between the eyes. There are also dusky markings (marbling) on the back, flanks, limbs and around anus.

== Habitat and conservation ==
The species occurs in montane forest, including high-altitude cedar forests and pine plantations. It can also occur in the grassland adjacent the wooded areas, but this is considered a marginal habitat. Its elevational range is 700–2,500 m (2,300–8,200 ft) above sea level It lives in leaf litter but can also climb trees.

Threats to this species include logging, plantation of pines, spread of small-scale subsistence farming, and use of fire to manage grasslands. Part of the range receives some protection from the Mount Mulanje Biosphere Reserve.
