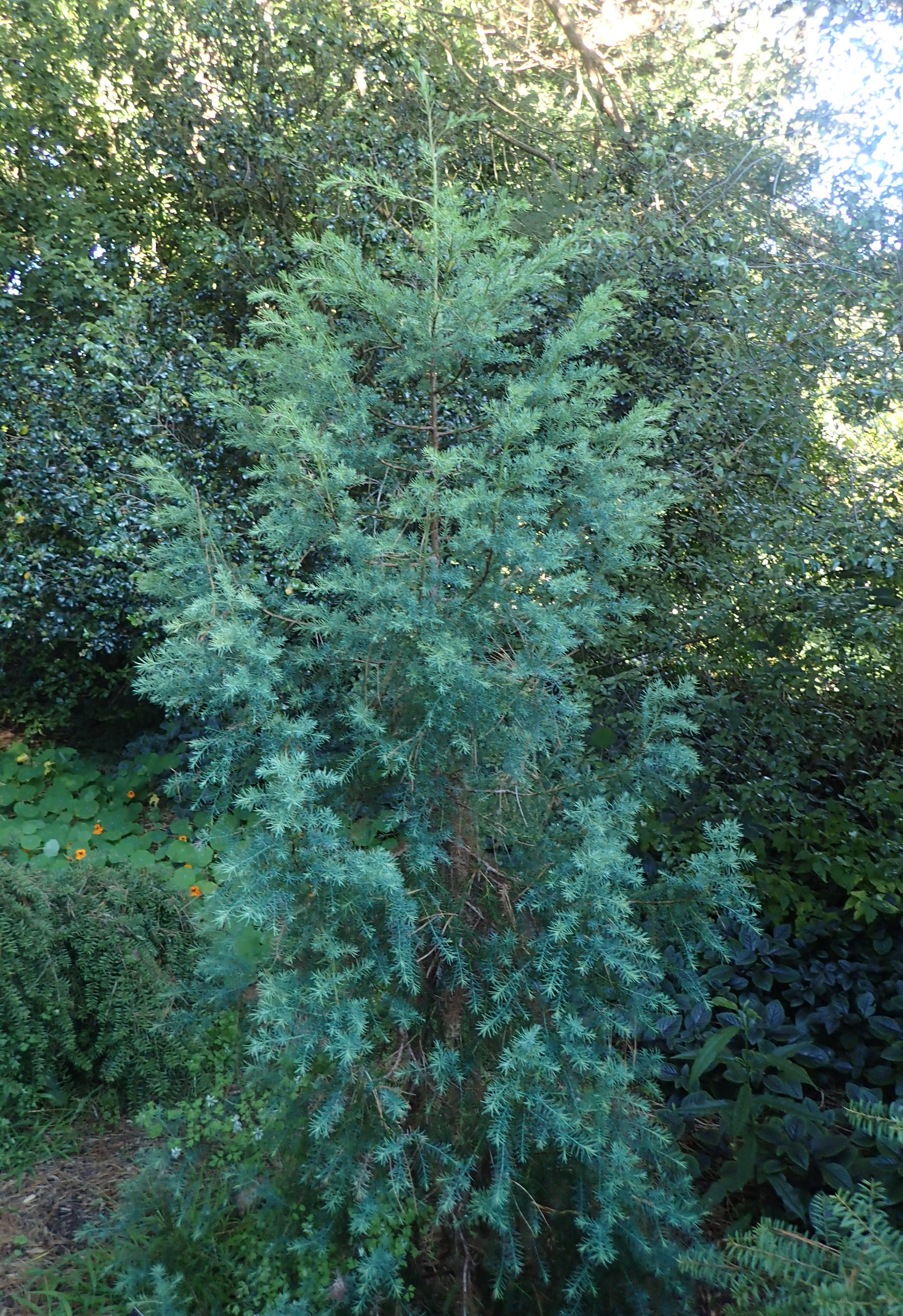

Conservation status
- Near Threatened (IUCN 3.1)

Scientific classification
- Kingdom: Plantae
- Clade: Tracheophytes
- Clade: Gymnosperms
- Division: Pinophyta
- Class: Pinopsida
- Order: Cupressales
- Family: Cupressaceae
- Genus: Widdringtonia
- Species: W. schwarzii

Binomial name
- Widdringtonia schwarzii (Marloth) Mast.

Synonyms
- Callitris schwarzii Marloth

= Widdringtonia schwarzii =

Species of conifer endemic to South Africa

Widdringtonia schwarzii, the Willowmore cedar or Willowmore cypress, Afrikaans: Baviaanskloof-seder) is a species of conifer in the cypress family, Cupressaceae. It is endemic to the Baviaanskloof and Kouga Mountains west of Port Elizabeth in the Eastern Cape Province of South Africa; it occurs on dry rocky slopes and crags at 600–1,200 m altitude. It is threatened by habitat loss, particularly by wildfire. The Willowmore cypress is a protected tree in South Africa.

It is a medium-sized coniferous tree growing to 20–25 m (formerly known to 40 m) tall. The leaves are scale-like, 1.5 mm long and 1 mm broad on small shoots, up to 10 mm long on strong-growing shoots, and arranged in opposite decussate pairs. The cones are globose to rectangular, 2–3 cm long, with four scales. It is closely related to Widdringtonia wallichii from Western Cape Province, being most easily distinguished by its larger seeds with a short seedwing.
