= Chambe Peak =

Mountain in Malawi

Coordinates: 15.899°S 35.526°E

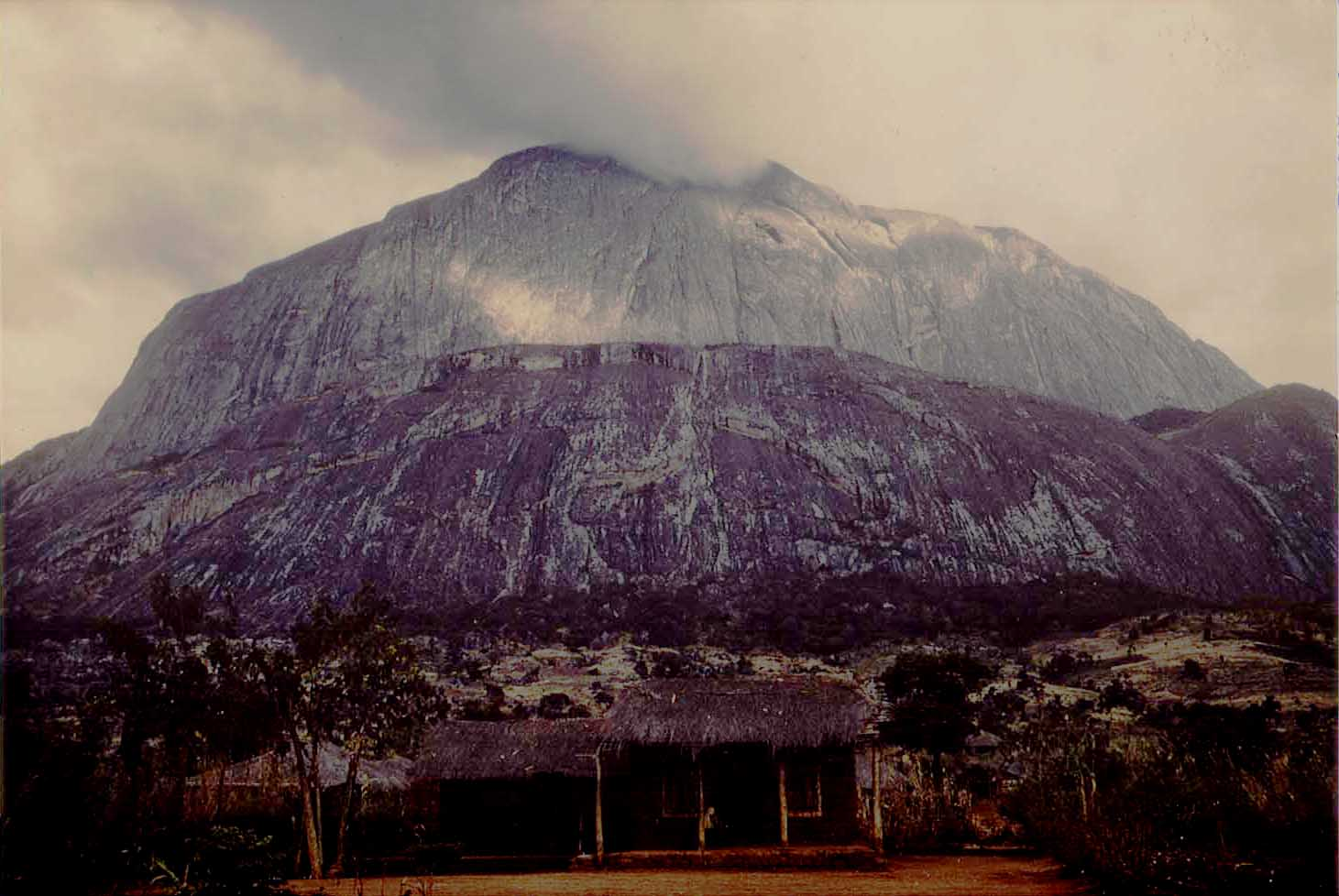
Chambe Peak

Chambe Peak is a peak of Mulanje Massif, one of the highest mountains in Southern Africa, with an elevation of 3,002 meters (9,849 ft.). A steep path provides a great view across Southern Malawi and Mozambique on a clear day. The plateau on the top is part of the forest of Mulanje Cedar; Chambe also has a farm and living spaces in a hut run by the Forestry Commission in Malawi. Chambe is also the base for climbing the sheer cliff face; Chris Bonnington has detailed this in the record book at Chambe Hut. Proper rock climbing equipment is necessary for the ascent. Likubula Path is the common descent; although it can be ascended, it is more difficult and rocky than ascending from Chambe.
