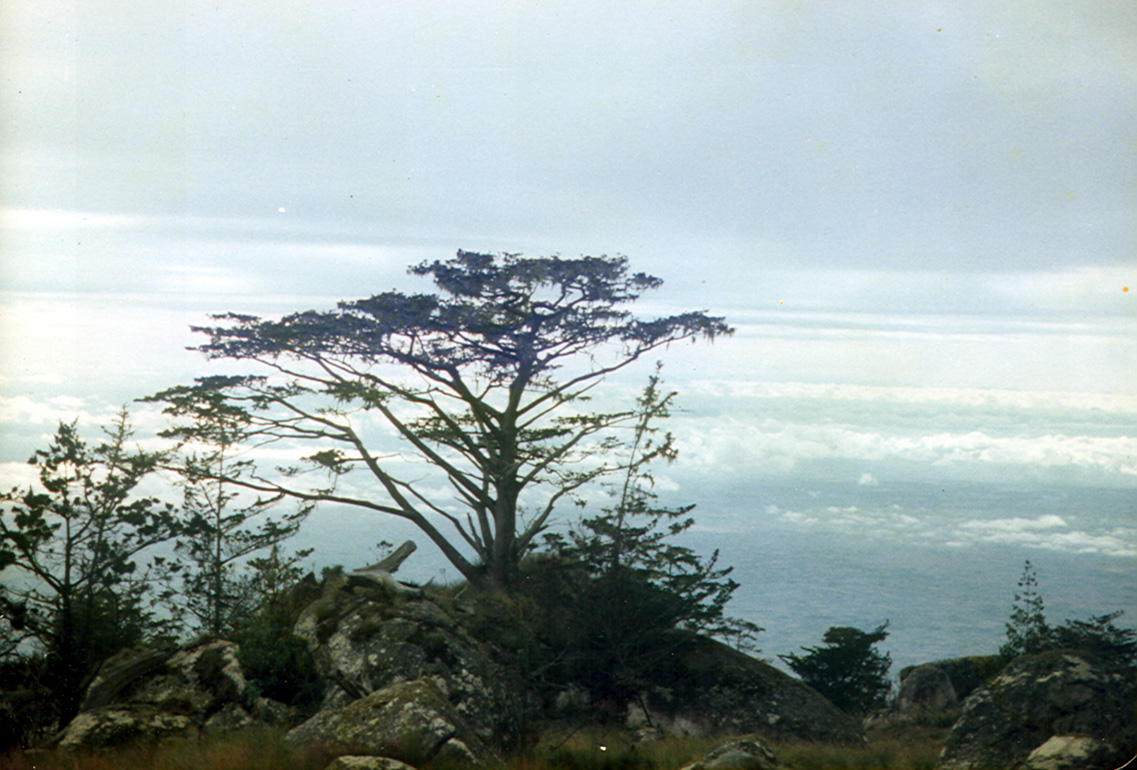
- Widdringtonia whytei

Scientific classification
- Kingdom: Plantae
- Clade: Embryophytes
- Clade: Tracheophytes
- Clade: Gymnosperms
- Division: Pinophyta
- Class: Pinopsida
- Order: Cupressales
- Family: Cupressaceae
- Subfamily: Callitroideae
- Genus: Widdringtonia; Endl.

Type species
- Widdringtonia cupressoides (L.) Endl.

Species
- W. nodiflora; W. schwarzii; W. cedarbergensis; W. whytei

Synonyms
- Pachylepis Brongniart 1833 non Lessing 1832; Parolinia Endlicher 1841 non Webb 1840

= Widdringtonia =

Genus of conifers

Widdringtonia is a genus of coniferous trees in the cypress family, Cupressaceae. The name was Austrian botanist Stephan Endlicher's way of honouring an early expert on the coniferous forests of Spain, Capt. Samuel Edward Widdrington (1787–1856). There are four species, all native to southern Africa, where they are known as cedars or African cypresses.

== Description ==
This genus contains large shrubs and trees, reaching 5–20 m tall (to 40 m in W. whytei). Juveniles have needle-like leaves that are arranged in spirals. The scale-like leaves in adults are arranged in decussate opposite pairs in four rows along the twigs.

The plants are dioecious. The small male cones grow at the ends of twigs. The scales have no stalks. They grow into an upward, decreasing beak with two to six pollen sacs at the base of the cone.

The female cones are small and stalkless and grow in short spikes on the branches. The scales grow in two opposite rows that spread at the base during pollination. They then close into a corky, leathery cone with five or more ovules at the base of each scale. The cones become woody as they mature.

The cones mostly remain closed on the trees for many years, opening only after being scorched by a wildfire; this then releases the seeds to grow on the newly cleared burnt ground. They open at four very thick valves that correspond to the four scales. Each cone produces few seeds. They are wing with hard test and two cotyledons.

In W. whytei the cones open soon after maturity to shed the seed without fire; this species is more sensitive to fire and only grows in moister situations where it is protected from fire. The best adapted to fire is W. nodiflora, which has the ability to re-grow from the roots, as well as by seed.

== Species ==
Phylogeny of Widdringtonia

- - W. whytei Rendle (Mulanje cedar)
  - - W. nodiflora (von Linné) Powrie (Mountain cypress)
    - - W. schwarzii (Marloth) Masters (Willowmore cedar)
      - W. cedarbergensis Endlicher ex Carrière (Clanwilliam cedar)

One species is widespread in southern Africa, while the other three have restricted ranges, often occurring with or near to the widespread species.

Image	Scientific name	Distribution
	Widdringtonia nodiflora	Widespread, southern Malawi south to Western Cape Province, South Africa.
	Widdringtonia schwarzii	Endemic, Baviaanskloof and Kouga Mountains (west of Port Elizabeth), Eastern Cape Province, South Africa.
	Widdringtonia cedarbergensis	Endemic to Cederberg Mountains (northeast of Cape Town), Western Cape Province, South Africa.
	Widdringtonia whytei	Endemic, Mulanje Massif, Malawi.

The closest relatives of Widdringtonia are Callitris and Actinostrobus from Australia, which differ in their cones and leaves being in whorls of three, not opposite pairs.

== Uses ==
The wood is light, soft and aromatic. It can be easily split and resists decay. It is used to make furniture, indoor and outdoor panelling, and fence posts. That of W. whytei was particularly valuable as it was available in large sizes, but this species is now endangered and no longer cut to any extent.

== References and external links ==
- Pauw, C. A. & Linder, H. P. 1997. Widdringtonia systematics, ecology and conservation status. Bot. J. Linn. Soc. 123: 297–319.
- Recommended English names for trees of Southern Africa (archive)
- Arboretum de Villardebelle - Photos of cones
