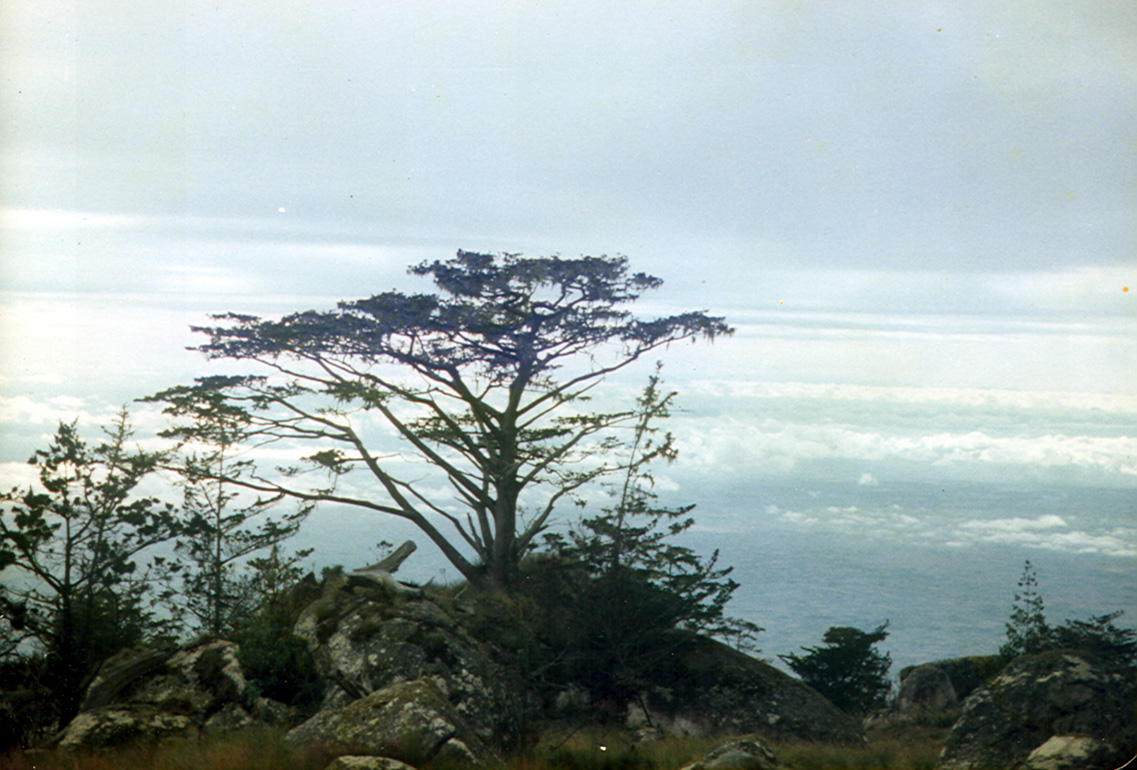
- Widdringtonia whytei on Mount Mulanje, Malawi

Conservation status
- Critically Endangered (IUCN 3.1)
- CITES Appendix II

Scientific classification
- Kingdom: Plantae
- Clade: Tracheophytes
- Clade: Gymnosperms
- Division: Pinophyta
- Class: Pinopsida
- Order: Cupressales
- Family: Cupressaceae
- Genus: Widdringtonia
- Species: W. whytei

Binomial name
- Widdringtonia whytei Rendle

Synonyms
- Callitris whytei (Rendle) Engl.; Widdringtonia nodiflora var. whytei (Rendle) Silba; Widdringtonia nodiflora subsp. whytei (Rendle) Silba

= Widdringtonia whytei =

Species of conifer

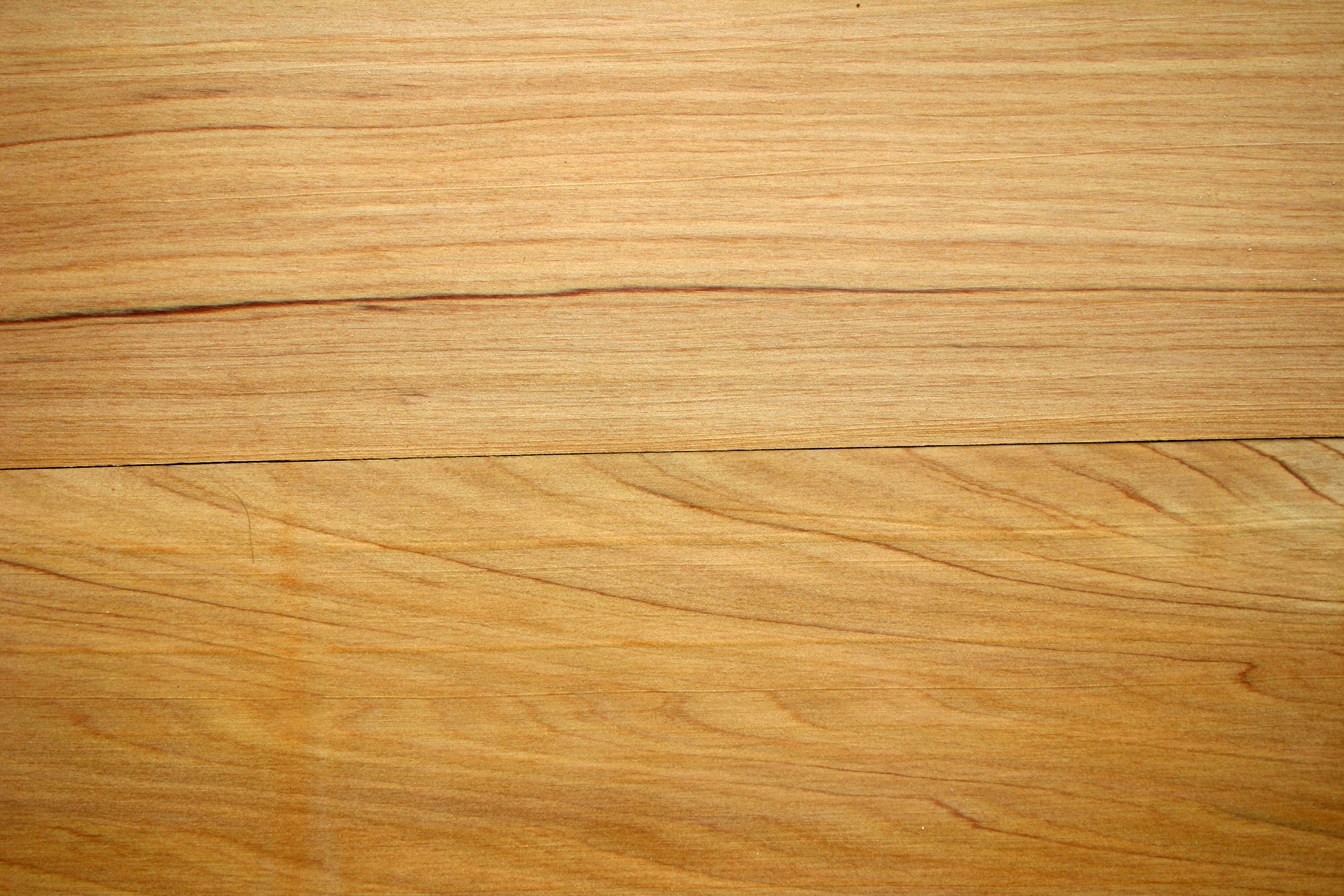
Widdringtonia whytei timber

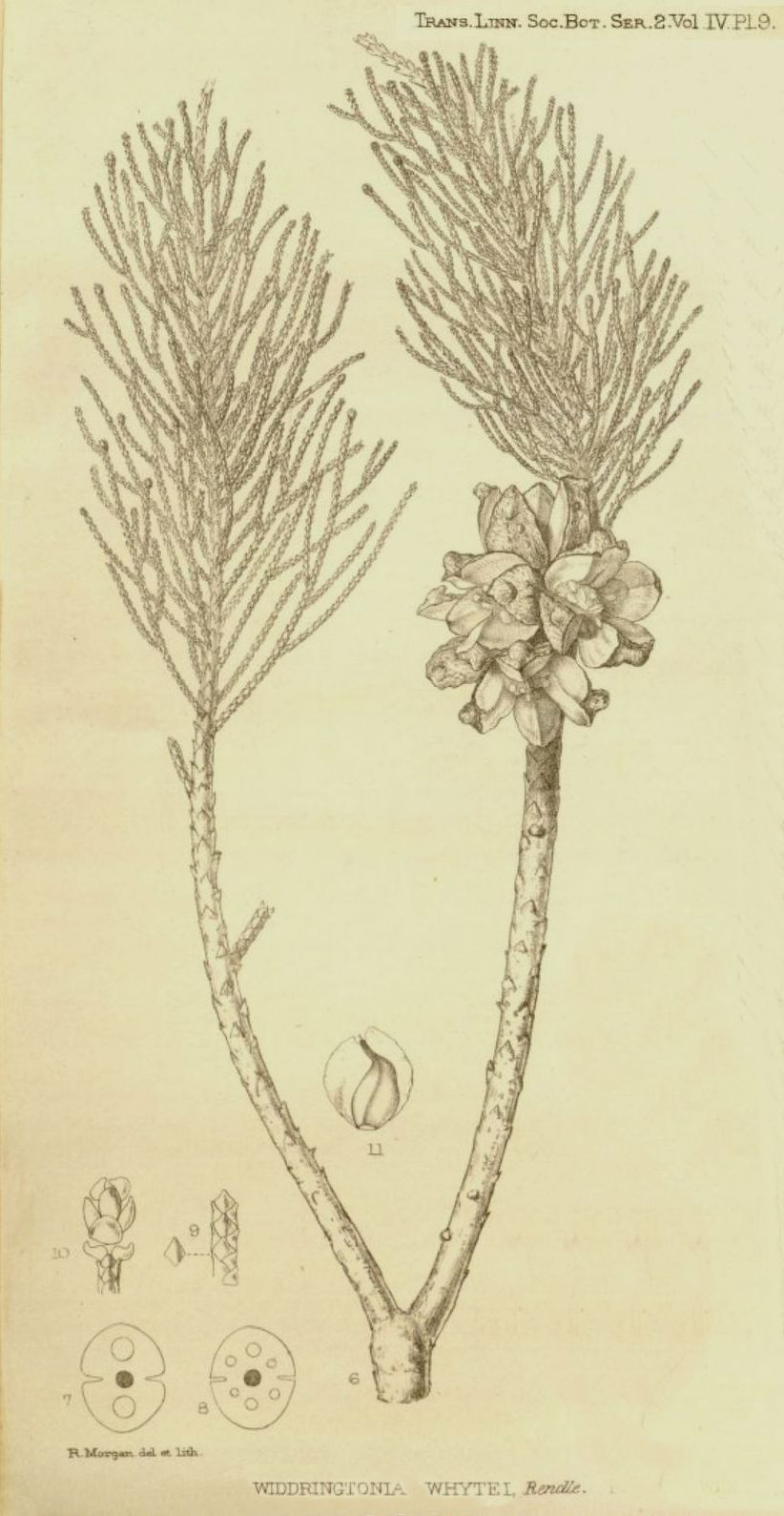
Plate by Robert Morgan (1863–1900)

Widdringtonia whytei, the Mulanje cedar or Mulanje cypress, is a species of conifer in the cypress family, Cupressaceae, endemic to Malawi, where it is endemic to the Mulanje Massif at altitudes of 1,830–2,550 m (6,000–8,370 ft). It has become endangered as a result of over-harvesting for its wood, and an increase in the frequency of wildfires due to human activity.

== Description ==
It is a large coniferous tree growing to 40–50 m (130–160 ft) tall. The leaves are scale-like, 1.5–3.5 mm long and 1–1.5 mm broad on small shoots, up to 10 mm long on strong-growing shoots, and arranged in opposite decussate pairs. The cones are globose, 1.5–2.2 cm (0.59–0.87 in) long, with four scales.

== Distribution ==
The species Widdringtonia nodiflora is common in South Africa and Zimbabwe in its dwarf form which has little more stature that a scrubby bush. It is only on Mulanje and Mchese Mountain that a closely related tree form is found, Widdringtonia whytei, commonly known as Mulanje cedarwood, but renamed "Mulanje cypress" by the University of the Witwatersrand, to better reflect its botanical relationships.

On these mountains the tree is limited to altitudes between 1,830 and 2,550 m (6,000 and 8,370 ft), and it is normally confined to hollows and valleys where the topography provides some protection from fire. Most commonly it occurs as small woodlands amongst rolling tussocky grassland slopes, between craggy, granite, rock faces.

The timber is pale red, straight grained and pleasantly fragrant. Its major qualities are that it works well and is extremely durable, being resistant to attacks from termites, wood boring insects and fungi. For these reasons the timber achieved major economic significance during the first three decades of the 20th century, when it was high in demand for developing work. Currently the timber is most used in the making of local arts and crafts, fishing boats for Lake Malawi, as well as in the construction and decoration of many prestigious buildings.

== Threat of extinction ==
Due to the high demand for its timber and changing ecological conditions on the mountain, the tree is under threat of extinction. Mulanje cypress is a pioneer species, not a climax species, this means that it is good at taking advantage of sites which suddenly become free of other competing species but it is not successful in open competition. Thus, when fire occurs which destroys the trees in an area of woodland, Mulanje cedar will normally be the first tree species to re-establish itself. Other species will come in later but because the cedar is relatively fast growing, it will not face much competition for sunlight.

=== Requisites for regeneration ===
If the area is undisturbed, the cypress will continue to grow well and other, more shade-tolerant species, will come in and form a dense canopy beneath it. The forest floor will then become dark, and young cedar, being relatively light demanding, will not flourish. It is only if there is further disturbance in the area which allows a lot of light to the forest floor that significant quantities of cedar will be able to establish itself. Thus, fire is an essential pre-requisite for dense, even, natural regeneration. The timing between fires is also critical. If fires are too frequent, the young trees will be killed before they can produce seed; if the fires are too infrequent the trees will die before space is created for their seeds to use. Generally it is said that a fire interval between 100 and 200 years would be ideal. During recent years, however, due to the increasing population of subsistence farmers around the base of the mountain, fires spreading up and over the mountain, especially in the dry season, have become more frequent. It is clear that most young trees are being killed before they reach maturity.

== Conservation ==
=== Role of Forestry Department ===
The Forestry Department provides the cedar forests with protection from damaging fires. Each year at the beginning of the dry season hundreds of kilometers of firebreaks are hoed clean of vegetation to provide barriers which will impede the advance of fires. In addition early controlled burning is carried out to reduce the buildup of combustible material which could otherwise cause very intense and damaging fires later in the dry season. For further safety fire standby gangs equipped with fire fighting equipment are stationed on each of the plateau areas whenever there is a fire hazard.

As well as providing protection from fires the Forestry Department and the Mulanje Mountain Conservation Trust carefully control the use of the trees. Back in the day sawing licenses could be issued by the Forestry Department, but because there was still an extensive amount of illegal pit sawing taking place, the sawing season has been closed since 2007. But of course the pit sawing did not stop. The black market for cedar wood grew, and has not been stopped, yet. All cedar wood sawn after 2007 is illegal wood, and can be confiscated by Forestry, MMCT and the Malawi Police. Since 2009 there are also Armed Forestry Groups patrolling the Cedar clusters, to stop the illegal pit sawyers.

=== Other conservation efforts ===
But firebreaks and patrols are not the only things done to conserve Malawi's National Tree. Forestry has established a planting programme to re-populate the Mulanje cedar (cypress). In the rainy season 2008/09 there were over 50,000 seedlings planted on Mount Mulanje with an estimated survival rate of over 30%. In 2009/10 Forestry plans to plant more than 20,000 seedlings, with, hopefully, an even higher survival rate.

But the problem is not solved, yet. Conservation needs to be continued with rising intensity. The Widdringtonia whytei is still listed as "Threatened-Endangered (IUCN 2.3)" in the annual Red List published by the International Union for Conservation of Nature (IUCN). If the conservation work is not continued, the noble Mulanje cedar, Malawi's National Tree, will probably become extinct in natural stands in less than 10 years.
