= Ruo–Ndiza Hydroelectric Power Station =

Hydroelectric power station in Malawi

- Location within Malawi
- Country: Malawi
- Location: Mulanje,
- Coordinates: 16°05′25″S 35°39′53″E
- Purpose: Power
- Status: Operational
- Operator: Mulanje Hydro Limited

Dam and spillways
- Impounds: Confluence of Ruo River and Ndiza River

Power Station
- Turbines: Pelton turbine 2 x 3.30 MW (4,430 hp); 1 x 1.65 MW (2,210 hp)
- Installed capacity: 8.25 MW (11,060 hp)

The Ruo–Ndiza Hydroelectric Power Station is an operational 8.25 megawatts (11,063 hp) hydroelectric power plant in southeastern Malawi, at the border with Mozambique.

== Location ==
The power station is located across the confluence of the Ruo River and its tributary, the Ndiza River, in Mulanje District, in the Southern Region of Malawi, at the international border with the Republic of Mozambique.

The location is within the Lujeri Tea Estate, approximately 96 kilometres (60 mi), by road, southeast of Blantyre, the commercial and financial capital of Malawi.

== Overview ==
In March 2018, Malawi's installed electricity-generating capacity was 363 megawatts (487,000 hp), With peak demand of 350 megawatts and growing at about 6 percent annually, the Malawian grid has very little flexibility. This has exposed the country to severe, recurrent load-shedding.

Mulanje Renewable Energy Plc (also Mulanje Hydro Limited), a private energy-generating company, domiciled in Malawi, contracted Gilkes, a British electric turbine manufacturer to build this power station, over a two-year period.

== Technical details ==
The power station is a run-of-river design which does not require a dam and therefore no need for a reservoir. There are three Pelton-type turbines each rated at 3.30 megawatts (4,425 hp). One was installed on the Ndizi River, during the first phase. Due to the water flow rates on this small river, only 1.65 megawatts could be extracted.

The second phase included the installation of two more Pelton turbines each rated at 3.3 megawatts, across the Ruo River, yielding a total of 6.6 megawatts in new energy generation. The total output of the power complex is 8.25 megawatts.

== Construction ==
The construction budget has been reported at US$16 million. Construction began in June 2018 and concluded in April 2020. The power generated is sold to the national power distributor Electricity Supply Commission of Malawi (Escom), under a long-term power purchase agreement.

== See also ==
- List of power stations in Malawi
