= Mulanje =

Town in Malawi

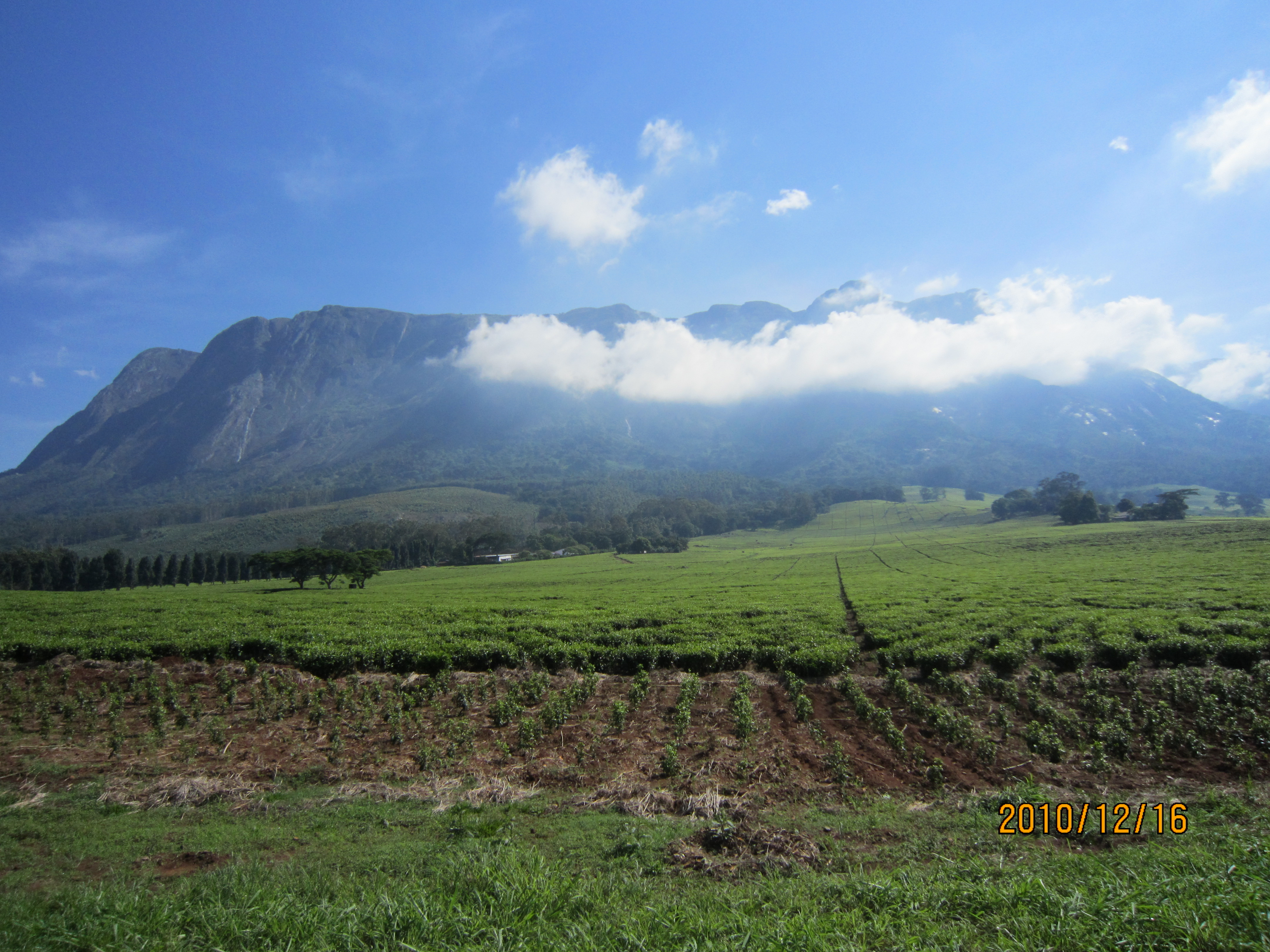

- Location in Malawi
- Coordinates: 16°01′33″S 35°30′29″E
- Country: Malawi
- Region: Southern Region
- District: Mulanje District

Population (2018 Census)
  - Total: 14,782
- Time zone: +2
- Climate: Cwa

Mulanje, formerly called Mlanje, is a town in the Southern Region of Malawi, close to the border with Mozambique, to the east. It is near the Mulanje Massif.

== History ==
A mission was established here and it was at first on the banks of the mountain. It moved in 1928 to new buildings which included staff houses, a small maternity based hospital and a school. 1950 saw the construction of a place for trainee midwives to live and eight years later an operating theatre was built. 1972 saw a new block for maternity, 1980 a ward for children and in 1999 it could claim to be a full hospital as it opened a ward for men.

== Location ==
The town of Mulanje lies along the M-2 highway from Thyolo to the west to the Mozambican border to the east. It is approximately 69 kilometres (43 mi), by road, south-east of Blantyre, the commercial and financial capital of Malawi. This is approximately 380 kilometres (236 mi), by road, southeast of Lilongwe, the largest city in Malawi and the country's capital. The geographical coordinates of the town of Mulanje are: 16°01'33.0"S, 35°30'29.0"E (Latitude:-16.025833; Longitude:35.508056).

== Notable people ==
The activist Maggie Banda was born here in 1975 although her family moved to Blantyre when she was a child. Roseby Gadama was born here and in 2019 she was elected as a member of parliament to represent Zomba Thondwe.

Rev. Lindesay Robertson was based here in 1959 at the mission. He was married to doctor Kate Robertson and she became the only doctor to 200,000 people. In 1961 Kate stood for parliament. Lindesay organised hundreds of people to dig pipelines to bring water off Mulanje Massif.

== Overview ==
Mulanje is a tourist attraction and serves as a staging base for climbers who want to scale Mount Mulanje or those who want to explore the countryside at its base. Residential and camping accommodation is available.

Mulanje is also the headquarters of a conservation group, the Mulanje Mountain Conservation Trust. The small town of Mulanje is the center of Malawi's tea growing industry. The Lujeri Tea Estates, adjacent to the border with Mozambique, is the location of the 8.25 megawatts (11,063 hp) Ruo–Ndiza Hydroelectric Power Station, that is owned and operated by Mulanje Renewable Energy Plc, a private enterprise.

== Demographics ==
Year	Population
1987	7,113
1998	12,548
2008	14,497
2018	14,782

== Points of interest ==
The following points of interest in or near the town of Mulanje include the following: (a) the offices of Mulanje Town Council (b) the offices of Mulanje District Administration (c) Mulanje District Hospital (d) a branch of National Bank of Malawi (e) a branch of NBS Bank and (f) the headquarters of Malawi-Mulanje Mountain Biodiversity Conservation Project.

== See also ==
- Encephalartos gratus
- Widdringtonia whytei
