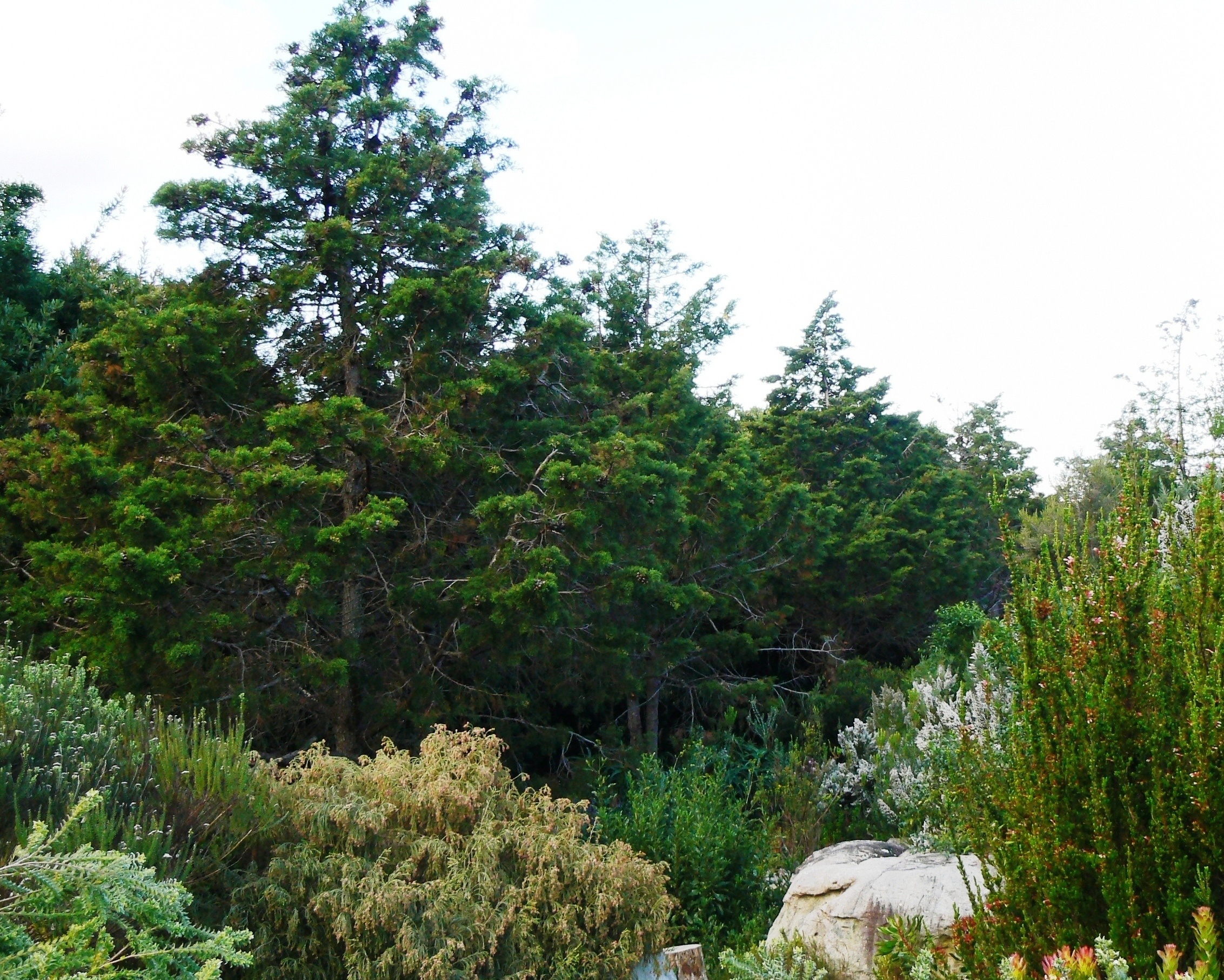

Conservation status
- Least Concern (IUCN 3.1)

Scientific classification
- Kingdom: Plantae
- Clade: Tracheophytes
- Clade: Gymnosperms
- Division: Pinophyta
- Class: Pinopsida
- Order: Cupressales
- Family: Cupressaceae
- Genus: Widdringtonia
- Species: W. nodiflora

Binomial name
- Widdringtonia nodiflora (L.) Powrie

Synonyms
- List: Callitris capensis Schrad. ex Gordon & Glend.; Callitris commersonii (Brongn.) T.Durand & Schinz; Callitris cupressoides (L.) Schrad. ex E.Mey. in J.F.Drège; Callitris juniperoides (L.) T.Durand & Schinz; Callitris mahonii (Mast.) Engl.; Callitris stricta Schrad. ex Carrière; Cupressus africana Mill.; Cupressus humilis Salisb.; Cupressus juniperoides L.; Frenela juniperoides (L.) Parl.; Juniperus caesia Carrière; Juniperus capensis Lam.; Pachylepis commersonii Brongn.; Pachylepis cupressoides (L.) Brongn.; Pachylepis juniperoides (L.) Brongn.; Parolinia juniperoides Endl. ex Gordon not validly publ.; Sabina caesia (Carrière) Antoine; Schubertia capensis Spreng. nom. superfl.; Taxodium capense Paxton; Taxodium juniperoides (L.) Rich. ex Steud.; Thuja aphylla Burm.f. nom. illeg.; Thuja cupressoides L.; Thuja quadrangularis Vent.; Widdringtonia caffra O.Berg; Widdringtonia commersonii (Brongn.) Endl.; Widdringtonia cupressoides (L.) Endl.; Widdringtonia dracomontana Stapf; Widdringtonia juniperoides (L.) Endl.; Widdringtonia mahonii Mast.; Widdringtonia natalensis Endl.; Widdringtonia nodiflora var. dracomontana (Stapf) Silba; Widdringtonia nodiflora subsp. dracomontana (Stapf) Silba; Widdringtonia stipitata Stapf

= Widdringtonia nodiflora =

Species of conifer

Widdringtonia nodiflora, the mountain cypress, is a species of conifer in the cypress family, Cupressaceae, native to Southern Africa. It usually grows at high altitudes, typically among rocks on mountainsides. Its foliage and wood are highly flammable while its natural habitat is prone to fire. To compensate, the species will coppice from its roots after being burnt down.

== Description ==
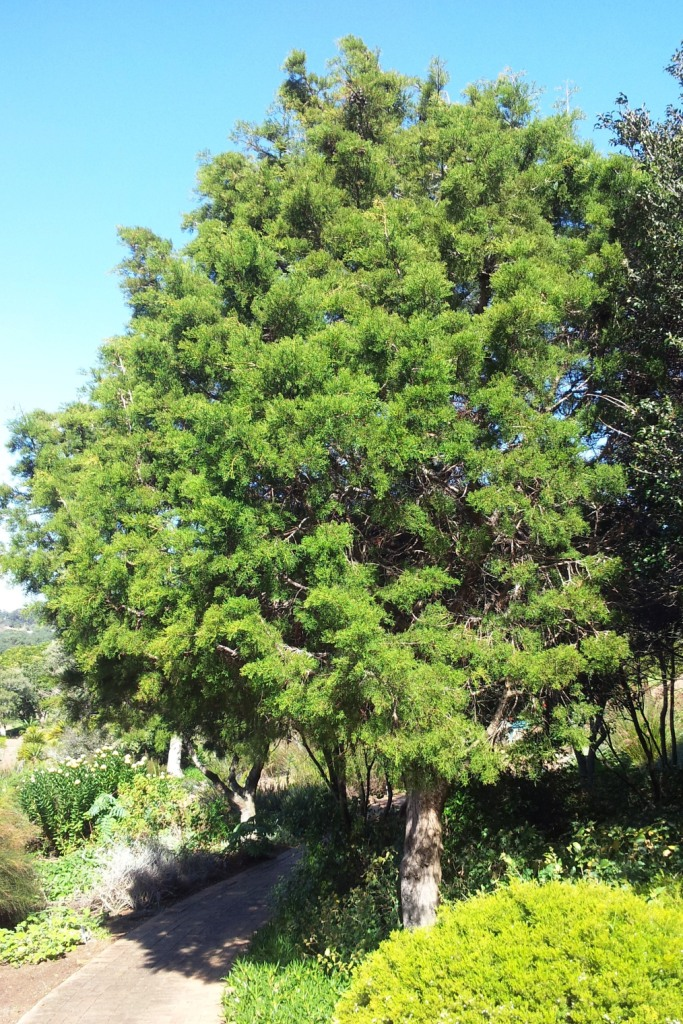
A small Widdringtonia nodiflora specimen in cultivation as an ornamental. Cape Town.

It is a large coniferous multistemmed shrub or small to rarely medium-sized tree growing to 5–7 m (rarely to 25 m) tall. The leaves are scale-like, 1.5–2 mm long and 1-1.5 mm broad on small shoots, up to 10 mm long on strong-growing shoots, and arranged in opposite decussate pairs. The cones are globose, 1–2 cm long, with four scales. Each tree produces both male and female cones. It is unique in the genus in its ability to coppice, readily re-sprouting from burnt or cut stumps; this enables it to survive wildfires, and is considered a major factor in allowing its abundance relative to the other species in the genus. Its wood is highly flammable - another adaptation for its fire-prone environment.

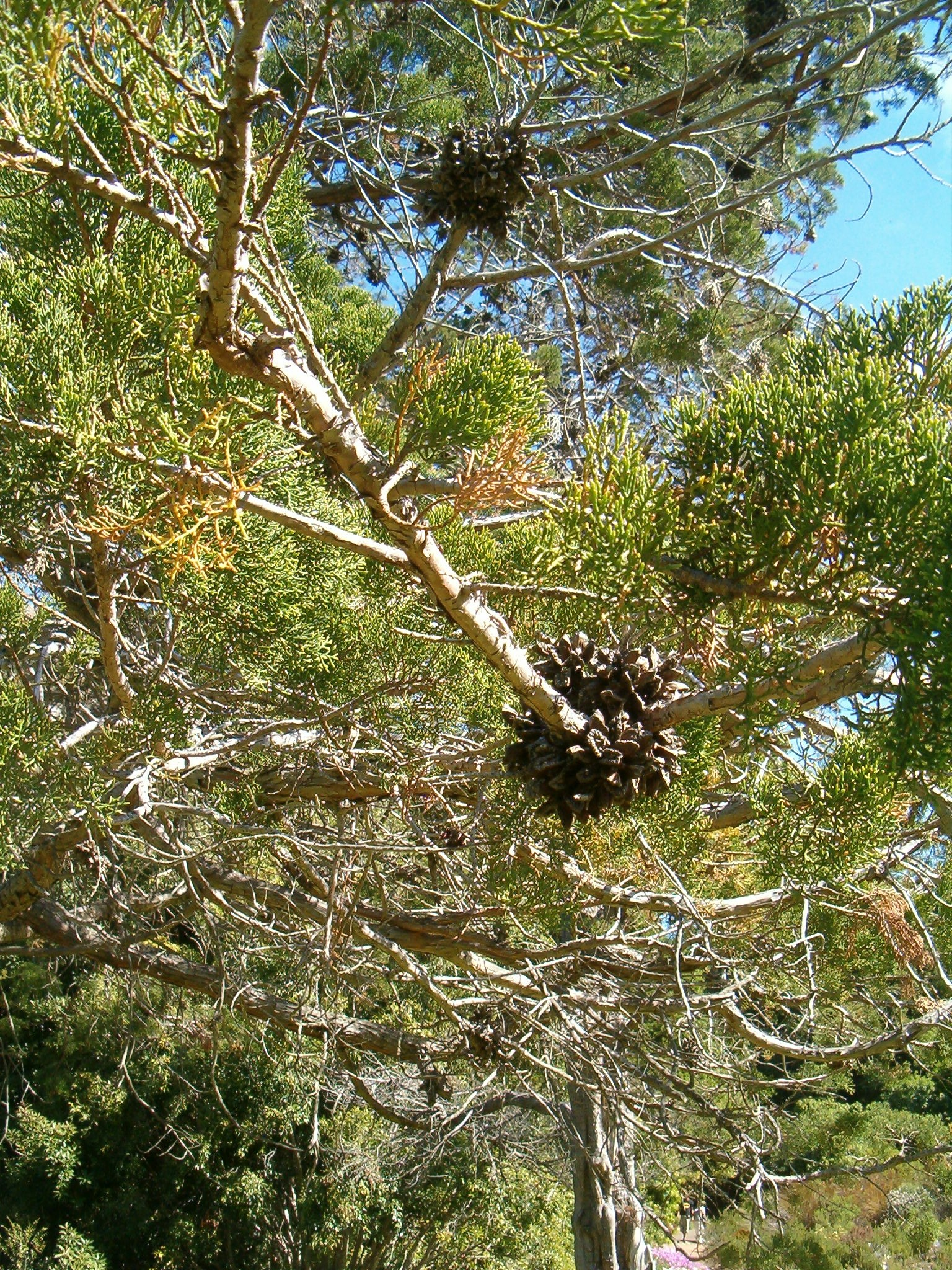
Widdringtonia nodiflora seed cones in clusters around a branch.

== Distribution ==
It occurs naturally from Table Mountain in the south, to southern Malawi, southern Mozambique, eastern Zimbabwe and throughout eastern and southern South Africa. It is the only widespread species in its genus, and the only one not threatened or endangered. It is closely related to the endangered cypress ("Cedar") of the Cederberg mountains.
As its name suggests, the Mountain Cypress is usually found at high altitudes on mountainsides, growing among rocks, and in gullies, typically in mountain fynbos and grassland. They normally occur in small groups, like the little forest of them on the mountain above Kirstenbosch.

== Growing the mountain cypress ==
The mountain cypress can be propagated from seed, sown during autumn in well-drained sand. The seeds germinate over several weeks, and it grows about 0.3 metres a year. It grows in cool or wet climates and is resistant to frost. It grows well as a container plant and ornamental tree and, when planted in a pot, can be used as a reusable southern hemisphere christmas tree. It's water-wise and environmentally friendly indigenous alternative to the pine tree.
