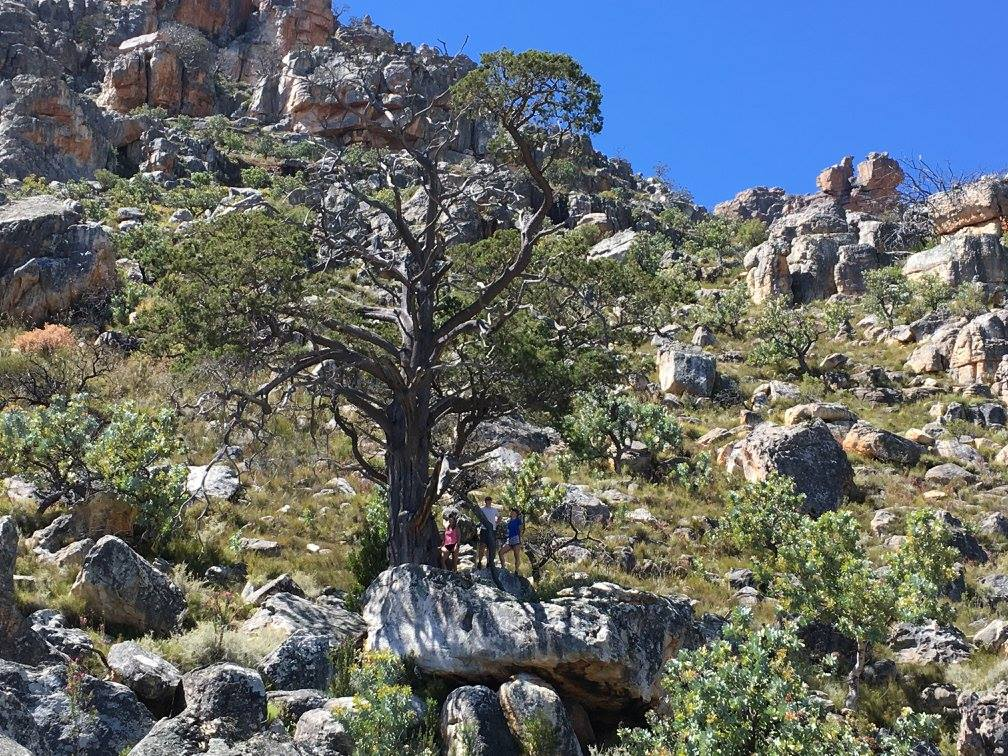

Conservation status
- Critically Endangered (IUCN 3.1)

Scientific classification
- Kingdom: Plantae
- Clade: Tracheophytes
- Clade: Gymnosperms
- Division: Pinophyta
- Class: Pinopsida
- Order: Cupressales
- Family: Cupressaceae
- Genus: Widdringtonia
- Species: W. cedarbergensis

Binomial name
- Widdringtonia cedarbergensis Endl. ex Carrière

Synonyms
- Callitris arborea Schrad. ex D.E.Hutchins; Widdringtonia wallichii A. Farjon, S. Higgins, S. Fox, D. Raimondo nom. illeg.; Widdringtonia wallichiana Gordon nom. inval.

= Widdringtonia wallichii =

Species of conifer

Widdringtonia cedarbergensis, the Clanwilliam cedar or Clanwilliam cypress, is a species of conifer in the cypress family, Cupressaceae, native to South Africa, where it is endemic to the Cederberg Mountains northeast of Cape Town in Western Cape Province. Due to harsh weather conditions, like limited rainfall and frequent wildfires, growth is limited. Ring width almost correlates with rainfall due to such harsh environmental conditions It is threatened by habitat loss and protected in South Africa under the National Forest Act (Act 84) of 1998.

It is a small tree growing to 5–7 m (rarely to 20 m) tall. The leaves are scale-like, 1.5 mm long and 1 mm broad on small shoots, up to 15 mm long on strong-growing shoots, and arranged in opposite decussate pairs. The cones are globose to rectangular, 2–3 cm long, with four scales.

== Chemical constituents ==
W. cedarbergensis is used in a cedarwood oil with multiple uses such as in Texas, it used as feedstock and in Virginia it is used for cosmetics like perfumes, aftershave lotions, and soaps. Cedarwood oil is also used in home remedies. The essential oil derived from leaves contains terpinen-4-ol (36.0%), sabinene (19.2%), γ-terpinene (10.4%), α-terpinene (5.5%) and myrcene (5.5%). The wood oil contains thujopsene (47.1%), α-cedrol (10.7%), widdrol (8.5%) and cuparene (4.0%).

== Conservation of species ==
W. cedarbergensis is an endangered species facing population decline. Reasons for such declines are habitat loss and inbreeding within populations. Habitat loss due to harsh environmental conditions. Wildfires occur in the area causing W. cedarbergensis mature trees to die frequently. W. cedarbergensis growth rate is slower compared to their counterparts which is a factor in population decline of the species. Genetically, there are some hypotheses on why W. cedarbergensis is not as fire resistant as some of the other within the genus and one of them is heavy logging. Heavy logging the current population is subjected to causes a fragmentation within the structure and heavy selection within the leftover mature trees within the population structure. Another hypothesis is that current selection for the mature trees is poorly adapted to fire intensive environments causing lack of genetic variation within the gene pool and heavy selection for those traits occurs. Upon further observations, it is not the mature trees themselves that are not fire resistant but their seed recruitment and lack of.

Inbreeding within the population of W. cedarbergensis due to self pollination because of lack of movement of pollen which further fragments the population. Seed dispersal is difficult which limits the success of fertilization in W. cedarbergensis. The seeds are left under the canopy of mature trees and waiting for the winds and runoff water. Other modes of dispersal like small animals are not likely to assist in the process of larger seeds. There is no dormancy period of the seeds after dispersal which leaves them vulnerable and sometimes unviable.

== Methods of conservation ==
One of the methods of population growth and conservation of W. cederbergensis is use of fire. Using calculated levels of fire during natural seed release which occurs in late summer and beginning autumn will assist in reduction of litter affecting seed dispersal. Litter during these periods inhibits the success of seed dispersal by blocking the seeds' movements of the winds and access to the runoff water. Their regeneration due to lack of seed dispersal from the blockage of litter and otherwise stated is inhibited as well.

Another method is replantation of seedlings in newly burned areas of W. cedarbergensis. Replanting seedlings in newly burned areas suggests when closely monitored and provided necessary components such as shade, soil, and competition from surrounding seedlings, they are successful in regrowth than seedlings planted prior. Also using pre heated seeds in previously burnt areas from wildfires increases success of growth.
