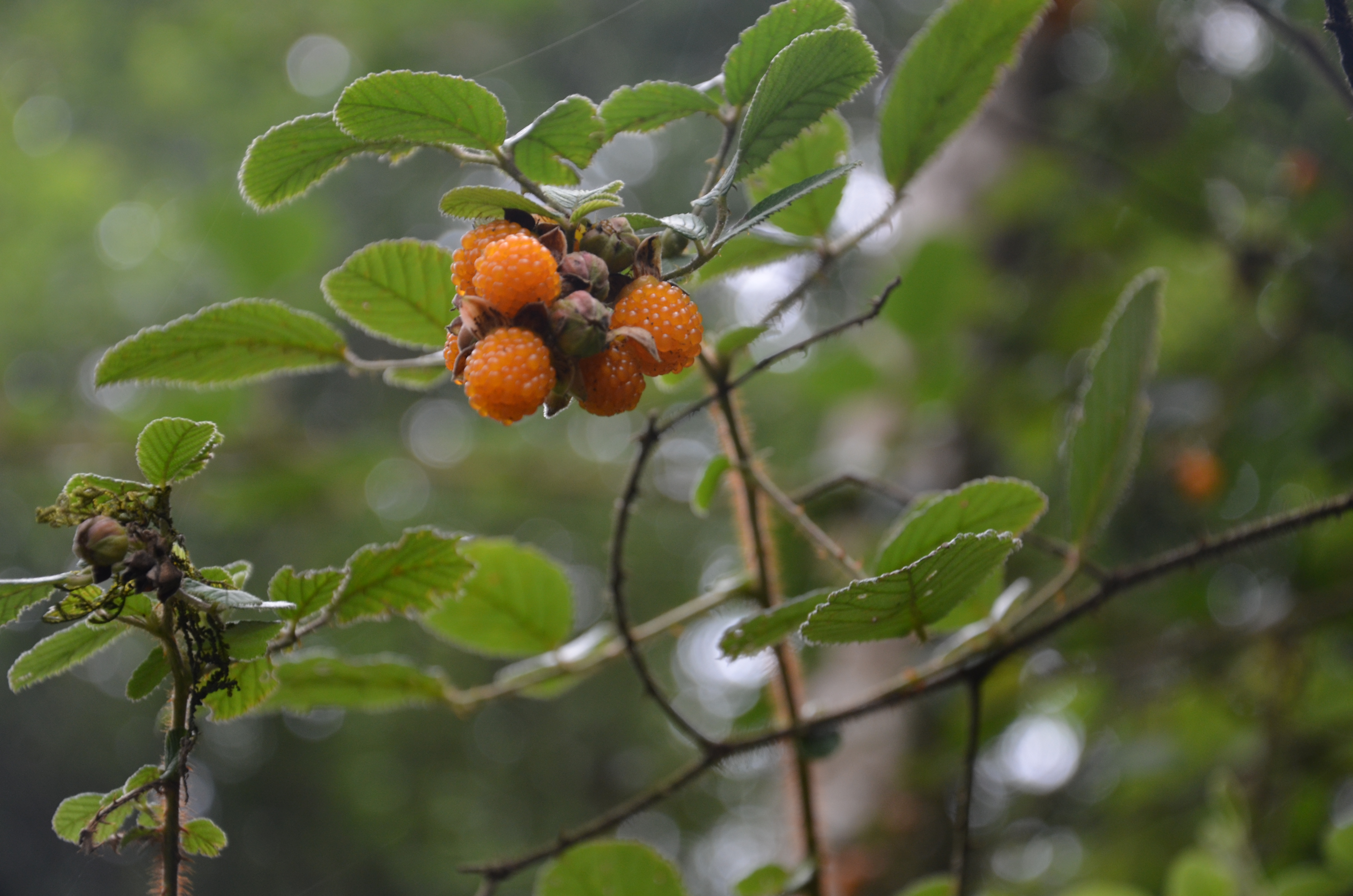
- Himalayan raspberry (Ainselu) fruit at Shivapuri National Park, Nepal

Scientific classification
- Kingdom: Plantae
- Clade: Tracheophytes
- Clade: Angiosperms
- Clade: Eudicots
- Clade: Rosids
- Order: Rosales
- Family: Rosaceae
- Genus: Rubus
- Subgenus: Rubus subg. Idaeobatus
- Species: R. ellipticus

Binomial name
- Rubus ellipticus Sm.

Varieties
- Rubus ellipticus var. ellipticus; Rubus ellipticus var. obcordatus (Franch.) Focke

Synonyms
- Species: Rubus tereticaulis subsp. ellipticus (Kupcsok) Domin; var. ellipticus: Rubus ellipticus subsp. acheniger Focke; Rubus ellipticus f. acuminatus Franch.; Rubus ellipticus var. acutifolius Kuntze; Rubus ellipticus var. denudatus Hook.f.; Rubus ellipticus var. depilis Focke; Rubus ellipticus var. flavus (Buch.-Ham. ex D.Don) Kuntze; Rubus ellipticus var. glabrifolius Kuntze; Rubus ellipticus var. incisus Kuntze; Rubus ellipticus var. insulanus Focke; Rubus flavus Buch.-Ham. ex D.Don; Rubus gowreephul Roxb., not validly publ.; Rubus paniculatus Moon, not validly publ.; Rubus sessilifolius Miq. ex Hook.f.; var. obcordatus: Rubus ellipticus f. obcordatus Franch.; Rubus obcordatus (Franch.) Thuan

= Rubus ellipticus =

Species of plant

Rubus ellipticus, commonly known as ainselu, golden evergreen raspberry, golden Himalayan raspberry, or yellow Himalayan raspberry, is an Asian species of thorny fruiting shrub in the rose family. Its native range stretches from the Indian subcontinent to southern China and Indochina and the Philippines.

== Description ==
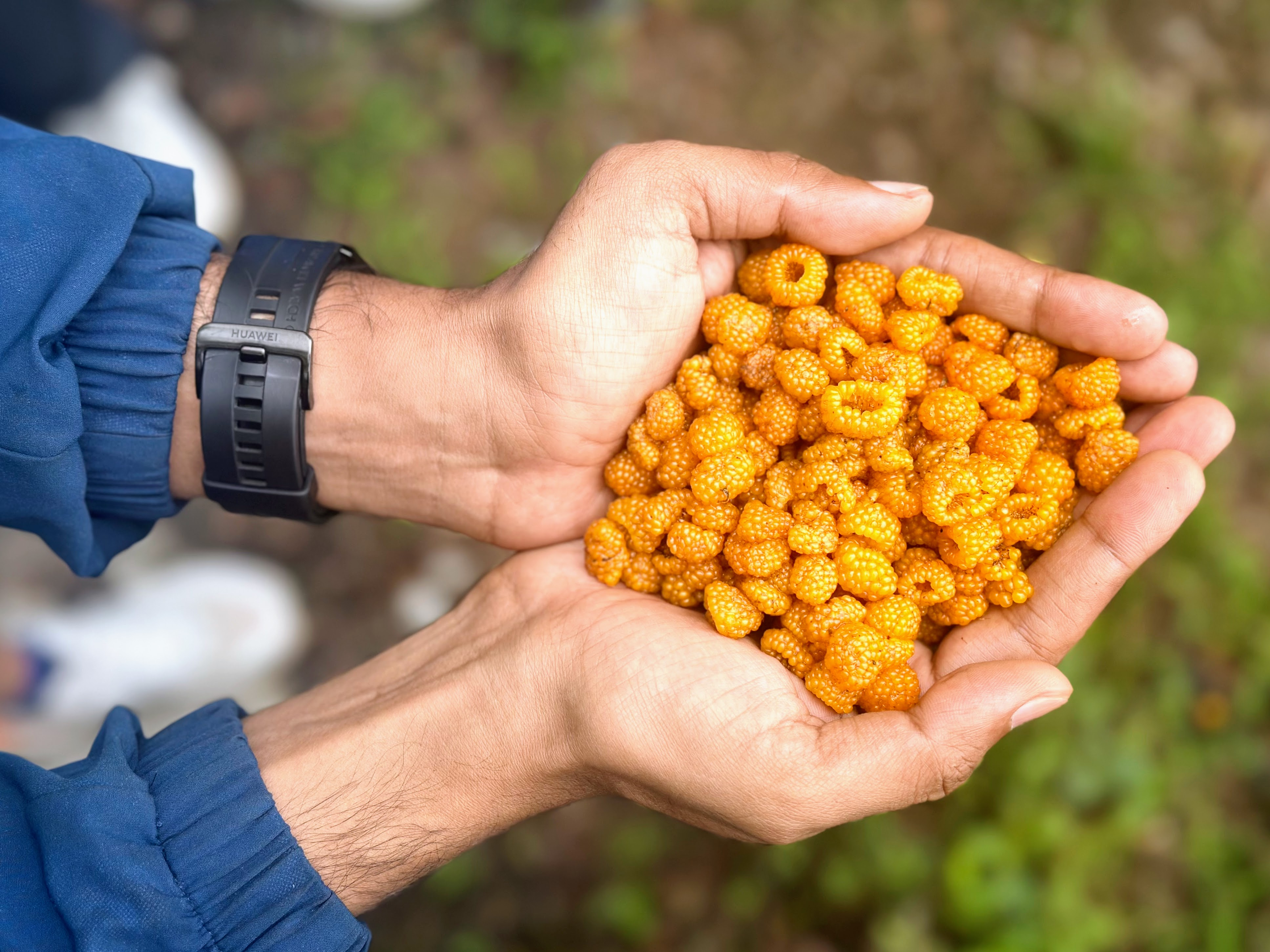
Ainselu (Golden Himalayan Raspberry) from Nepal

The golden Himalayan raspberry is a large shrub with stout stems or canes that can grow to up to 4.5 metres (15 ft) in length. Its leaves are trifoliate, with three elliptic or obovate leaflets typically growing to 5–10 centimetres (2–4 in) long. The leaves are green, with the underside being lighter in colouration, and the leaf surface is covered in downy hairs.

Its flowers are small and composed of five white petals, with the flowers being arranged in clusters of multiple flowers. In the Himalayas, it typically blooms between the months of February and April, whilst on the slopes of Mount Gede located on the western side of the island of Java in Indonesia, it can flower every three months, but its peak season is on April. Its fruit are sweet, detachable, and highly sought after by birds and elephants.

Rubus ellipticus is sweet to the taste, though it is not commonly harvested for domestic use. The fruit perishes quickly after plucking from the thorny bush.

== Taxonomy ==
It was first published and described by James Edward Smith in (A.Rees edited), Cycl. 30: n.° 16 in 1815.

== Etymology ==
The fruit has various names in South-Asian languages. It is called ainselu (Nepali: ऐँसेलु) in Nepali, hisalu (Kumaoni: हिसालु) in Kumaoni, hisol (Garhwali: हिसोल) in Garhwali, nyinch (Nyishi: निंच) in Nyishi, sohshiah (Khasi: सोहशियाह) in Khasi language, sher gong in Monpa, and aakhe (Mandeali: आखे) in Mandeali.

== Distribution and habitat ==
Originating in the temperate Himalayas region, the plant's native range stretches from the Indian subcontinent (Nepal, India, Sri Lanka and Pakistan) to southern China and Indochina and the Philippines. It can also be found in Laos, Myanmar, Thailand, Tibet, and Vietnam.

It is found as a weed in open grasslands and rarely in forests of Himalayan states of India, e.g., Himachal and Uttarakhand, in their higher reaches at an attitude of 1,500 to 2,100 m (4,900 to 6,900 ft). It is often found in pine forests of the region.

The golden Himalayan raspberry can be found in mesic or wet forests, and has adapted to be able to live in complete shade and in full sun exposure.

== Ecology ==
As with other Rubus species, its seeds are readily distributed by birds. It can asexually propagate through cutting. It can grow in open fields or in canopies of moist forests.

The Himalayan raspberry can support large populations of Drosophila, or fruit flies, from its rotting fruit. The fruit is consumed by Asian elephants.

=== Invasiveness ===
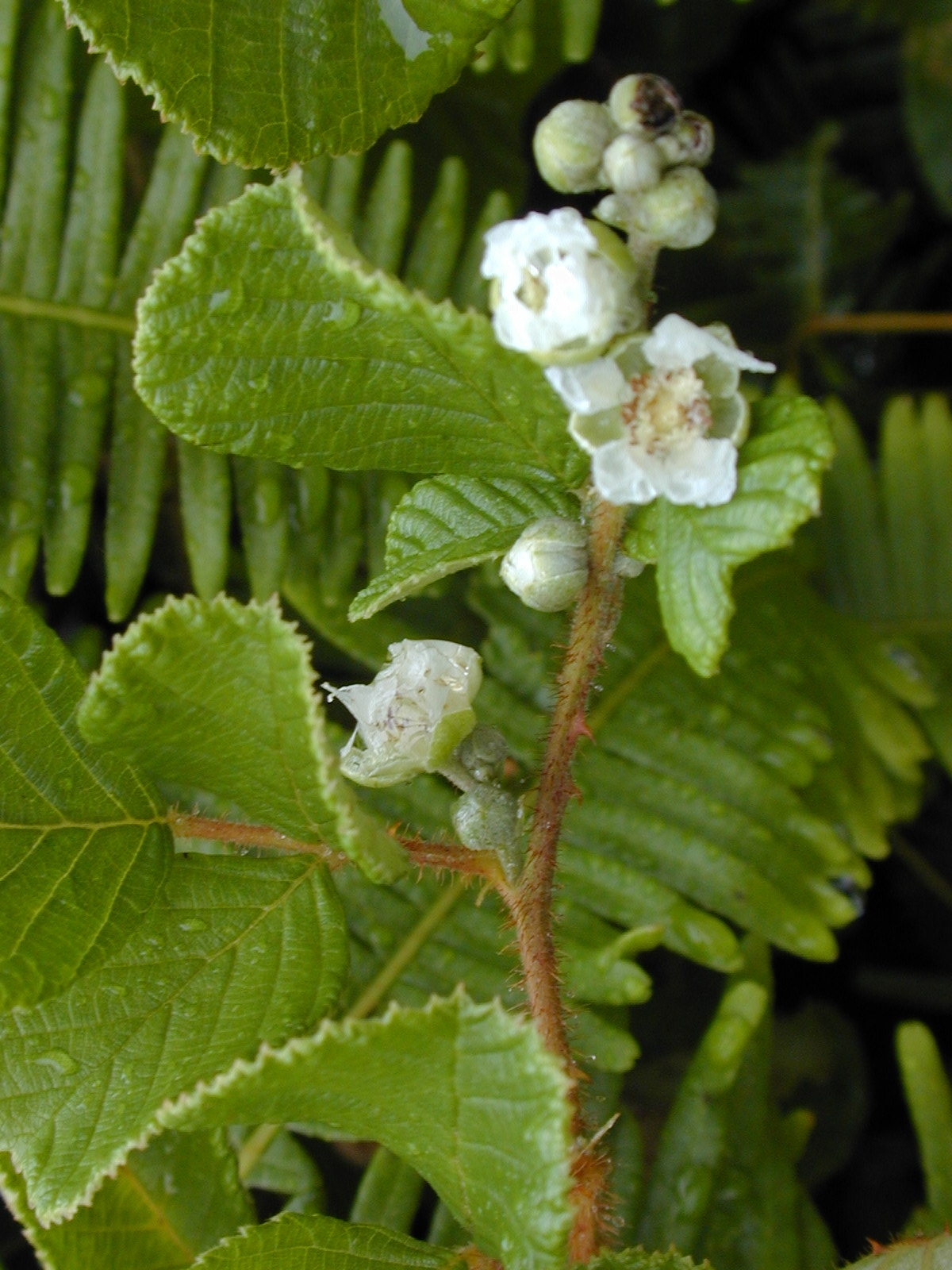
Rubus ellipticus flowers and leaves

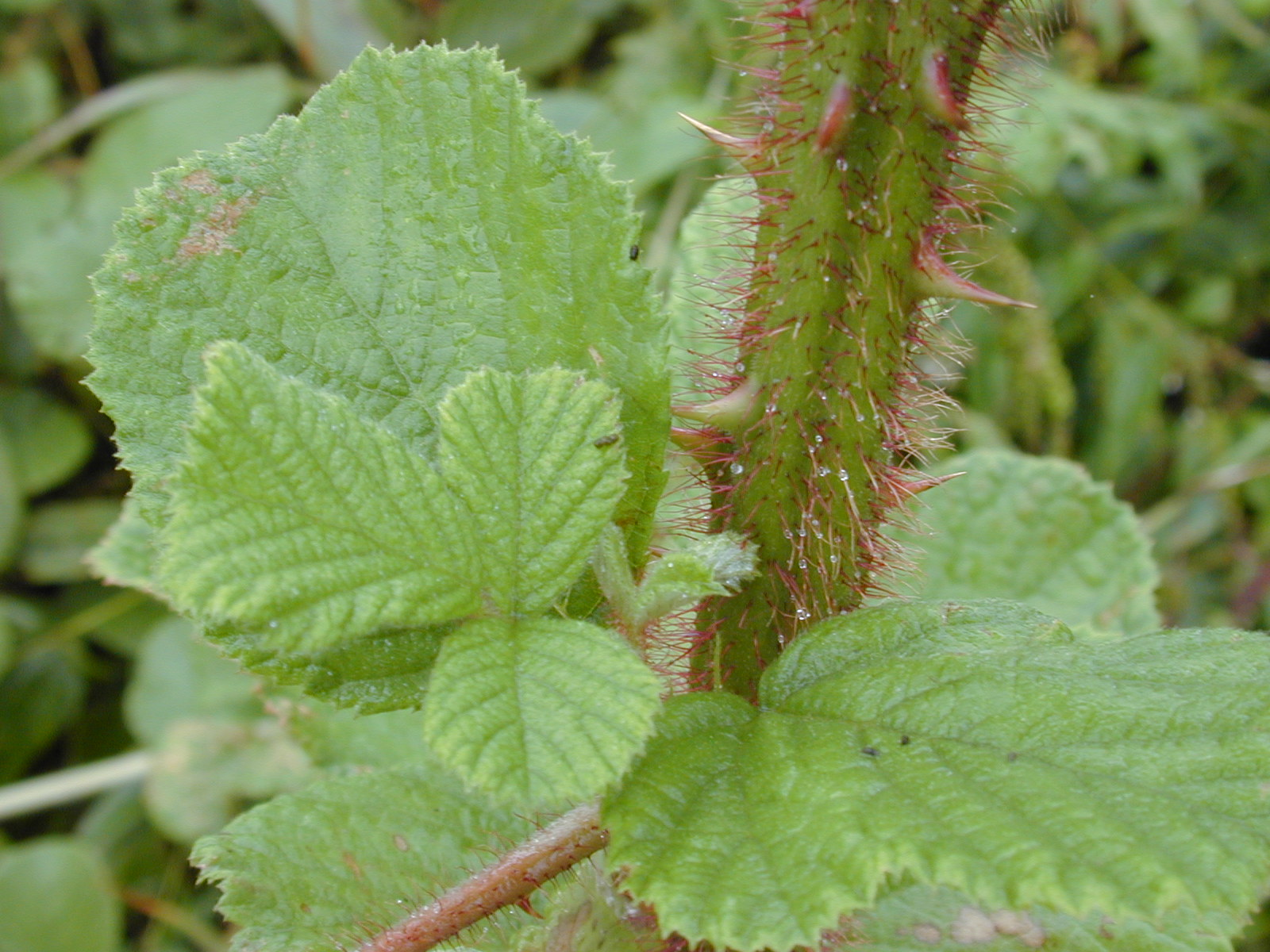
Prickly stem of R. ellipticus

Rubus ellipticus is listed in the IUCN Invasive Species Specialist Group database as an Invasive species, one of the world's 100 worst invasive species. It has been introduced into; Ecuador, Jamaica, Java, Malawi, Mozambique, New South Wales, Queensland (both in Australia) and Tanzania. It was first introduced in 1961 in Hawaii as an edible fruit and as an ornamental plant.

The yellow Himalayan raspberry poses a threat to native communities because it forms thick, impenetrable thickets, and competes with the native Rubus hawaiensis (Hawaiian raspberry). Abandoned farms and lands disturbed by feral pig populations are susceptible to invasion. It grows tall due to its stout stems which is a threat because of its ability to establish itself within the tree canopy. The yellow Himalayan raspberry is a threat to native flora because it can outcompete other plants. More specifically, it has higher photosynthetic rates, higher nitrogen fixation rates, and therefore a higher photosynthetic nitrogen use efficiency (or PNUE).

The yellow Himalayan raspberry is currently invasive only on Hawaii. It is considered a noxious weed by the National Park Service and the Hawaiian Department of Agriculture.

==== Control strategies ====
Due to its limited range, the golden Himalayan raspberry has been contained to a few stations on Hawaii. Any new populations are to be eliminated as quickly as possible. Control practices at Hawaii Volcanoes National Park have shown that simply identifying and removing the shrub can help dramatically reduce its invasive impact.

To eliminate a yellow Himalayan raspberry shrub, its root systems must be pulled out. The shrub shoots out roots deep underground after a fire or cutting. Fire can be applied to the roots if the shrub has been removed by physical means. Herbicides, such as glyphosate, can be used in containing the shrub.

== Uses ==
Nepali farmers have had limited success in harvesting and fermenting the aiselu fruit to produce a fruit wine. In Sikkim, its roots are used to treat stomach pain and headaches, and its fruits are used to treat indigestion.

The bark from this plant is used for medical reasons in Tibetan villages, mainly as a renal tonic and an antidiuretic. Its juices can be used to treat coughs, fevers, colic and sore throat. The plant can be used to make a bluish-purple dye.

The fruits of golden Himalayan raspberry was recorded as rich source of phenolics, Beta carotenes, ascorbic acid (vitamin C), many other important metabolites and antioxidants. The fruit extracts contain antimicrobial properties. The leaves contain various helpful properties as well.

== See also ==
- Choerospondias axillaris, also known as lapsi
- Myrica esculenta, also known as kafal
