= Mulanje Mountain Conservation Trust =

Mulanje Mountain Conservation Trust (MMCT)
- Abbreviation: MMCT
- Formation: 2000
- Headquarters: Malawi
- Coordinates: 15.9002°S 35.64483°E
- Executive Director: Carl Bruessow
- Website: mountmulanje.org.mw

The Mulanje Mountain Conservation Trust (MMCT) is a conservation trust in Malawi. Local conservationists founded MMCT as a non- governmental organisation with support from the UK’s Department for International Development (DfID), the World Bank, and Global Environment Facility (GEF) in 2000. In 2005, it was renamed a Conservation Trust Fund. The trust is based in Mulanje of Southern Region, Malawi and it is funded by the World Bank through the Global Environment Facility.

The trust was partnered with the United States Agency for International Development.
