= Sports in Malawi =

Sports in Malawi have been shaped by its history as a colony in the old British Empire,

== Football ==
Football is the most popular sport in Malawi. It is played by boys at all levels from makeshift village playfields to prep school league competition. Malawi fields a national football team. The country's biggest success was a third place finish at the 1987 All-Africa Games. This was the last year national football teams were allowed to play in the All-Africa Games. Since 1991, only under-23 teams are allowed to play.

== Netball ==
Netball has long been a popular sport for schoolgirls. Malawi is a full member of the International Federation of Netball Associations, and is currently ranked sixth internationally. The Malawi national netball team has put Malawi on the African map, qualifying for and coming first in regional tournaments such as the COSANA tournament. Malawi have competed at two Netball World Championships, and one Commonwealth Games. At the 2007 Netball World Championships, Malawi finished fifth beating strong teams such as Wales, Cook Islands, and South Africa.

Malawi's biggest sport achievement so far comes from Netball. The team earned a bronze medal at the 2016 Fast5 Netball World Series, the most important Fast5 netball tournament in the world. On continental level, Malawi earned the title of the 2012 Netball Africa Championship.

== Athletics ==
Athletics and cross-country running have also been developing since Malawian independence. A pioneer in the systematic training of talented young runners is Dr. Harold Salmon, a Peace Corps Volunteer who served in Malawi from 1966-1968. Smartex Tambala represented Malawi at the Olympic Games in 1992 in Barcelona, Spain. He competed in the Marathon road race. From the year 2000, there has been an improvement in the quality of athletes, the most notable of whom is Catherine Chikwakwa, silver medallist at the 2004 World Junior Championships in Athletics. There are other runners from the University of Malawi and the Army who have shown significant progress.

== Basketball ==
In post-colonial Malawi, basketball has also taken hold principally through the efforts of Peace Corps volunteers from the USA in the mid 1960s. The African Bible College has further contributed to the growth of basketball, by bringing professionals from USA to hold coaching clinics and also sending some of the best players to the USA.

Basketball is mostly made possible by individuals who provide university scholarships. Yet, sports scholarships in general are very rare in Malawi.

One of the recipients for a basketball school scholarship was Sharo Charlottie Kaiche, who as of 2021 is Youth Development Officer for the Likuni Gators, a spiritual based basketball and character development club with activities in four schools.

She works with all of the 3 zonal regions of Malawi for future success especially for U16, U18 and 3x3 basketball.

As of 2021, Sharo has also been the Vice Captain of the Lilongwe Arkangles, a contender for the top women’s basketball team in Malawi. She further coaches the Next Gen Academy and Catalyst Basketball Movement.

== Other sports ==
Just like basketball, volleyball has taken hold principally through Peace Corps Volunteers from the USA in the mid 1960s.

== See also ==
- Malawi at the Olympics
