= 2013 Taini Jamison Trophy Series =

International netball series

Tournament details
- Host country: New Zealand
- Dates: 24–31 October 2013

Final positions
- Champions: New Zealand (4th title)
- Runners-up: Malawi

Tournament statistics
- Matches played: 3

The 2013 Taini Jamison Trophy Series, also referred to as the New World Series, was the fifth Taini Jamison Trophy series. It featured New Zealand playing Malawi in a series of three netball test matches, played in October 2013. New Zealand won all three tests. The New Zealand team were coached by Waimarama Taumaunu and captained by Casey Kopua. Malawi were coached by Griffin Saenda and captained by Caroline Mtukule.

== Squads ==
=== New Zealand ===
New Zealand roster
Players
Coaches

Name	Pos	DOB	Height	Club	Nat	Caps
Jodi Brown	GA, GS	6 May 1981 (aged 32)	1.85 m (6 ft 1 in)	Southern Steel
Leana de Bruin	GD, GK	9 July 1977 (aged 36)	1.90 m (6 ft 3 in)	Waikato Bay of Plenty Magic
Katarina Cooper		12 January 1986 (aged 27)	1.80 m (5 ft 11 in)	Central Pulse
Shannon Francois	WA, C, GA	12 October 1990 (aged 23)	1.76 m (5 ft 9 in)	Southern Steel
Katrina Grant	GK, GD, WD	6 May 1987 (aged 26)	1.87 m (6 ft 2 in)	Central Pulse
Joline Henry	GD, WD	29 September 1982 (aged 31)	1.83 m (6 ft 0 in)	Northern Mystics
Casey Kopua (c)	GD, GK	19 June 1985 (aged 28)	1.88 m (6 ft 2 in)	Waikato Bay of Plenty Magic
Laura Langman	C, WD	16 April 1986 (aged 27)	1.73 m (5 ft 8 in)	Waikato Bay of Plenty Magic
Cathrine Latu	GS, GA	25 October 1986 (aged 26)	1.89 m (6 ft 2 in)	Northern Mystics
Te Huinga Reo Selby-Rickit	GK, GD	3 April 1989 (aged 24)	1.84 m (6 ft 0 in)	Central Pulse
Maria Tutaia	GA, GS	18 February 1987 (aged 26)	1.88 m (6 ft 2 in)	Northern Mystics
Irene van Dyk	GS, GA	21 June 1972 (aged 41)	1.90 m (6 ft 3 in)	Waikato Bay of Plenty Magic

Head coach

- Waimarama Taumaunu

Assistant coach

- Vicki Wilson

Physiotherapist:
Marion Meates
Performance Analyst
Dr Bobby Willcox
Operations Manager
Esther Molloy

Notes

- (c) – Captain
- (cc) – Co-captain
- (vc) – Vice-captain
- – Injury / maternity leave
- (TRP) – Temporary Replacement Player

Debuts

- Te Huinga Reo Selby-Rickit made her senior debut for New Zealand in the first test.
- Katarina Cooper made her senior debut for New Zealand in the second test.

=== Malawi ===
Malawi roster
Players
Coaches

Name	Pos	DOB	Height	Club	Nat	Caps
Jane Chimaliro	GA, WA	29 September 1985 (aged 28)	1.60 m (5 ft 3 in)	Civonets
Martha Dambo	WD, GD,	28 September 1993 (aged 20)	1.74 m (5 ft 9 in)	MTL Queens
Melenia Gideon	WD		–	Mafco
Joanna Kachilika	GD, WD	8 June 1984 (aged 29)	1.75 m (5 ft 9 in)	MTL Queens
Tina Kamzati	WA		–	Civonets
Bridget Kumwenda	WA, C	8 September 1991 (aged 22)	1.58 m (5 ft 2 in)	Kukoma Diamonds
Mwai Kumwenda	GS, GA	27 September 1989 (aged 24)	1.83 m (6 ft 0 in)	Victorian Fury
Takondwa Lwazi	C, WA	15 May 1992 (aged 21)	1.60 m (5 ft 3 in)	Blue Eagle Sisters
Jessie Mazengera	GS, GA		–	Kukoma Diamonds
Caroline Mtukule (c)	GD, GK	15 October 1986 (aged 27)	1.74 m (5 ft 9 in)	Kukoma Diamonds
Joyce Mvula	GS	14 April 1994 (aged 19)	1.84 m (6 ft 0 in)	Blue Eagle Sisters
Towera Vinkhumbo	GD, GK	14 February 1991 (aged 22)	1.75 m (5 ft 9 in)	Kukoma Diamonds

Head coach

- Griffin Saenda

Assistant coach

- Mary Waya
  Team Doctor
  Junnier Bamusi Kazembe

Notes

- (c) – Captain
- (cc) – Co-captain
- (vc) – Vice-captain
- – Injury / maternity leave
- (TRP) – Temporary Replacement Player

== Matches ==
=== First test ===
24 October 2013	New Zealand	70–32	Malawi	TSB Bank Arena
24 October 2013	Scoring by quarter: 14–10, 34–18, 50–27, 70–32			TSB Bank Arena
24 October 2013	Irene van Dyk 39/44 (89%); Jodi Brown 31/40 (78%)		Mwai Kumwenda 24/28 (86%); Joyce Mvula 7/9 (78%); Jane Chimaliro 1/3 (33%)	TSB Bank Arena

=== Second test ===
27 October 2013	New Zealand	68–49	Malawi	Pettigrew Green Arena
27 October 2013	Scoring by quarter: 19–11, 34–22, 48–38, 68–49			Pettigrew Green Arena
27 October 2013	Cathrine Latu 46/48 (96%); Maria Tutaia 22/32 (69%)		Mwai Kumwenda 42/47 (89%) ??	Pettigrew Green Arena

=== Third test ===
31 October 2013	New Zealand	72–39	Malawi	Claudelands Arena
31 October 2013	Irene van Dyk 21/21 (100%); Jodi Brown 20/23 (87%); Cathrine Latu 19/20 (95%); Maria Tutaia 12/15 (80%)		Mwai Kumwenda 24/25 (96%); Joyce Mvula 11/16 (69%); Jessie Mazengera 4/6 (67%)	Claudelands Arena
