= National Netball League =

National Netball League may refer to one of several netball leagues. These include:

== Australia ==
- Australian Netball League
- Australian State Netball League
- Commonwealth Bank Trophy
- Esso/Mobil Superleague
- Suncorp Super Netball

== Malawi ==
- National Netball League (Malawi)

== New Zealand ==
- ANZ Premiership
- National Netball League (New Zealand)

== See also ==
- ANZ Championship
