= Netball in Malawi =

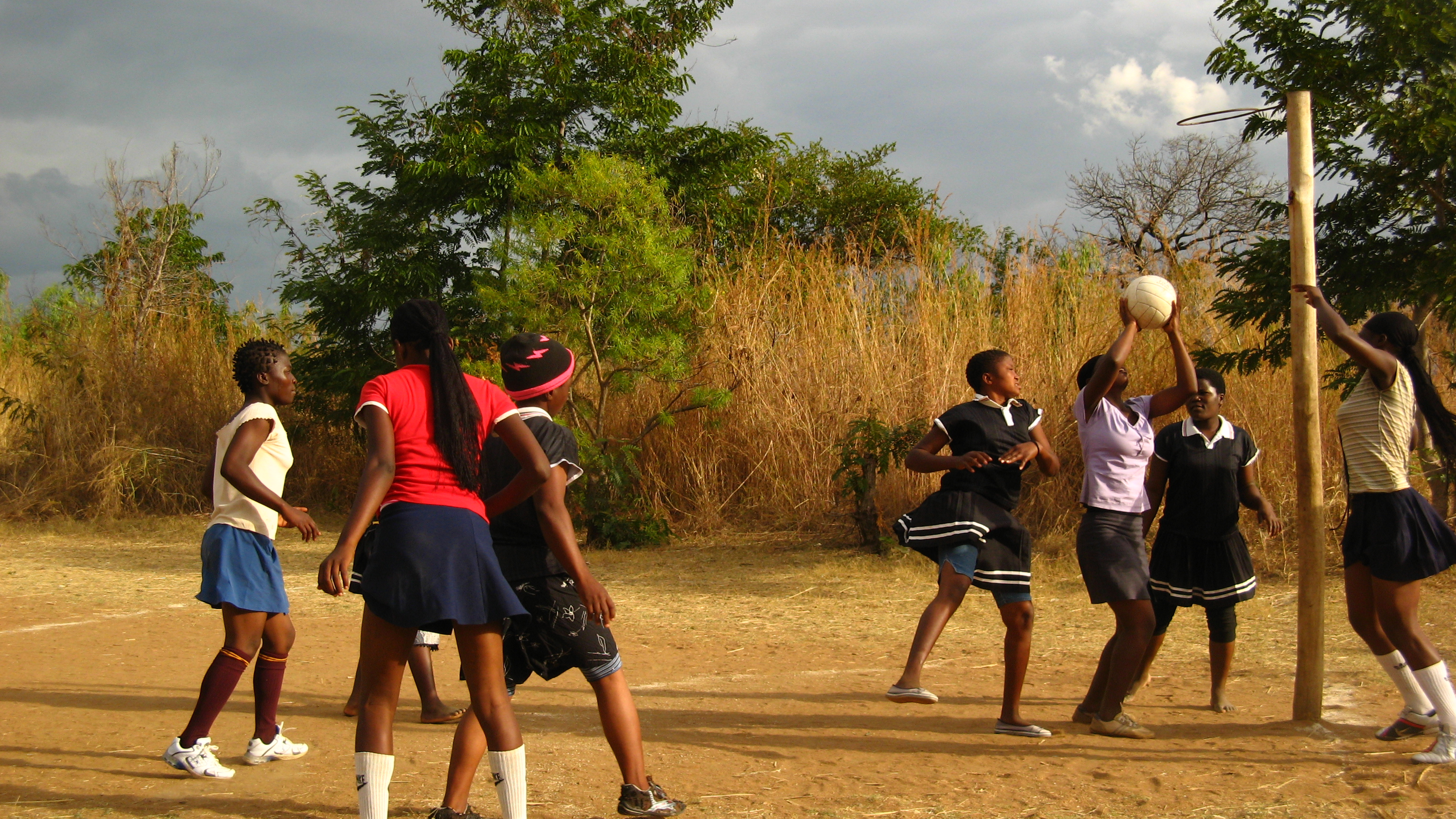
- Namitembo Trade and Agriculture School (NAMTAS) (in black) vs. Changalume. Namitembo, Zomba West, Malawi
- Country: Malawi
- Governing body: Netball Association of Malawi
- National team: Malawi

Netball in Malawi is organized by the Netball Association of Malawi.

== National team ==
The Malawi national netball team competes in international netball tournaments such as the Netball World Cup, the Commonwealth Games, the African Netball Championships, the Fast5 Netball World Series and the SPAR Diamond Challenge. Malawi's best performance at a major international tournament was a third place finish at the 2016 Fast5 Netball World Series. Malawi has defeated New Zealand, Australia and England in international tournaments. As of 1 July 2020, they are sixth in the INF World Rankings.

== Competitions ==
Malawi's three regions – Central Region, Southern Region and Northern Region – all have regional leagues. The top teams from the regions played in two national competitions, the Presidential Championship and the Champions League. The latter competition was launched in 2013 and was sponsored by GOtv Africa. It initially featured the top teams from Blantyre and Lilongwe but in 2015 it was expanded to included teams from Mzuzu. In 2014 and 2017 the Champions League used Fast5 netball rules in order to help the Malawi national netball team prepare for the 2014 and 2017 Fast5 Netball World Series tournaments.

In 2023, the national competitions were replaced by the new National Netball League.

== Club teams ==
Team	Former name	Sponsor/benefactor	Home city	Region	Founded
Blue Eagle Sisters		Malawi Police Service	Lilongwe	Central Region	1985
Civo Nets		Malawi Civil Service	Lilongwe	Central Region	mid–1970s
Kukoma Diamonds	ESCOM Sisters	ESCOM	Blantyre	Southern Region	2005
Thunder Queens	Post Nets; MTL Queens	MBC; Malawi Telecommunications Limited	Blantyre	Southern Region	1980s
Mzuzu Queens			Mzuzu	Northern Region	
Tigresses	ADMARC Tigresses; Bingu Tigresses	ADMARC; Bingu wa Mutharika	Blantyre	Southern Region	1970s

== Notable players ==
Player	Team	League
Mwai Kumwenda	Melbourne Vixens	Suncorp Super Netball
Joyce Mvula	Manchester Thunder	Netball Superleague
Towera Vinkhumbo	Severn Stars	Netball Superleague

== Gallery ==
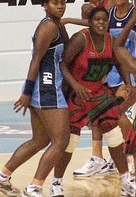
20 March 2006: Mary Waya (GA, right) playing for Malawi against Fiji at the 2006 Commonwealth Games
