= Telephone numbers in Malawi =

- Country: Malawi
- Continent: Africa
- NSN length: 7-9
- Country code: +265
- International access: 00
- Long-distance: n/a

In Malawi, the NSN length is usually seven or nine digits.

== Calling formats ==
To call Malawi, the following format is used: +265 1 XXX XXX or +265 X XXXX XXXX

Within Malawi dial the 7 or 10 digits subscriber number. There are no area codes.

== List of allocations in Malawi ==
The new number plan took effect in 2009.

LIST OF ALLOCATIONS
NSN		NSN length	Usage	Operator
Old number	New number	NSN length	Usage	Operator
1 XXX XXX	1 XXX XXX	7	Geographic number	Malawi Telecom Ltd
1 6XX XXX	1 6XX XXX	7	Geographic number	Malawi Telecom Ltd
1 8XX XXX	1 8XX XXX	7	Geographic number	Malawi Telecom Ltd
1 9XX XXX	1 9XX XXX	7	Geographic number	Malawi Telecom Ltd
1 2XX XXX	1 2XX XXX	7	Geographic number	Malawi Telecom Ltd
1 3XX XXX	1 3XX XXX	7	Geographic number	Malawi Telecom Ltd
1 5XX XXX	1 5XX XXX	7	Geographic number	Malawi Telecom Ltd
1 7XX XXX	1 7XX XXX	7	Geographic number	Malawi Telecom Ltd
none	2 1XXX XXXX	9	Geographic number	Access Communications Ltd (ACL)
none	7 7XXX XXXX	9	Non-geographic number	Globally Advanced Integrated Networks Ltd
8 XXX XXX; 4 XXX XXX	8 8XXX XXXX; 8 XXXX XXXX	9	Non-geographic number	TNM
9 XXX XXX; 5 XXX XXX; 3 XXX XXX	9 9XXX XXXX; 9 8XXX XXXX	9	Non-geographic number	Zain Malawi Limited (Airtel)
2 XXX XXX; 2 XXX XXX	2 2XXX XXXX	9	Non-geographic number	Access
