= National Netball League (Malawi) =

Netball competition in Malawi

The National Netball League is a netball competition in Malawi, representing the highest level of play in the country.

The league was originally due to launch in 2022, as a replacement for the Presidential National Cup. It was funded by a K40,000,000 sponsorship deal with the Salima Sugar Company. The first gameday was due to take place at the Griffin Saenda Sports Complex in Lilongwe, but it was postponed, as the venue had not yet been completed. The competition instead debuted in 2023, with the first event taking place in Salima. The tournament was suspended for several months due to a lack of funds, but following the receipt of additional money from Salima, it was completed in October, at the Don Bosco Netball Court in Lilongwe.

The teams taking part in the first competition were:

- Airforce
- Blue Eagles
- Civo
- Diamonds
- Ekwendeni Resource
- Imosys
- Karonga Queens
- Mafco
- Prison Sisters
- Tigresses
- Tremors
- Young Eagles
