= Malawi =

Country in Southeast Africa

Republic of Malawi Dziko la Malaŵi (Chichewa) Charu cha Malaŵi (Chitumbuka)
- Flag Coat of arms
- Motto: "Unity and Freedom"
- Anthem: "Mlungu dalitsani Malaŵi" ("O God Bless Our Land of Malawi")
- Location of Malawi (dark green) in southeast Africa
- Capital and largest city: Lilongwe; 13°57′S 33°42′E
- Official languages: English
- Recognised national languages: (none at national level)
- Recognised regional languages: Chewa; Chitumbuka
- Other languages: See list
- Ethnic groups (2024 census): 25.2% Chewa; 20.4% Tumbuka; 16.4% Lomwe; 15.3% Yao; 6.4% Ngoni; 5.9% Sena; 3.8% Mang'anja; 1.8% Tonga; 1.5% Ngonde; 0.6% Lambya; 0.5% Sukwa; 1.1% other
- Religion (2018 census): 82.3% Christianity; 58.5% Protestantism; 17.2% Catholicism; 6.6% other Christian; 13.8% Islam; 2.1% none; 1.2% traditional faiths; 0.6% other
- Demonym: Malawian
- Government: Unitary presidential republic
  - President: Peter Mutharika
  - Vice-President: Jane Ansah
  - House Speaker: Sameer Suleman
  - Chief Justice: Rizine Mzikamanda
- Legislature: National Assembly

Independence from the United Kingdom
  - Declared: 6 July 1964
  - Republic: 6 July 1966
  - Current constitution: 18 May 1994

Area
  - Total: 118,484 km^{2} (45,747 sq mi) (98th)
  - Water (%): 20.6%

Population
  - 2026 estimate: ▲23,012,886 (62nd)
  - 2026 census: 17,563,749
  - Density: 242.1/km^{2} (627.0/sq mi) (56th)
- GDP (PPP): 2026 estimate
  - Total: ▲$45.14 billion (137th)
  - Per capita: ▲$1,819 (209th)
- GDP (nominal): 2026 estimate
  - Total: ▲$18.31 billion (148th)
  - Per capita: ▲$579 (190th)
- Gini (2019): ▼51.6 high inequality
- HDI (2023): ▲0.517 low (172nd)
- Currency: Malawian kwacha (D) (MWK)
- Time zone: UTC+2 (CAT)
- Date format: dd/mm/yyyy
- Calling code: +265
- ISO 3166 code: MW
- Internet TLD: .mw
- * Population estimates for this country explicitly take into account the effects of excess mortality due to AIDS; this can result in lower life expectancy, higher infant mortality and death rates, lower population and growth rates, and changes in the distribution of population by age and sex than would otherwise be expected.: Information is drawn from the CIA World Factbook unless otherwise noted.

Malawi, (Note: /məˈlɑːwi/; lit. 'flames' in Chichewa and Chitumbuka) officially the Republic of Malawi, (Note: Chichewa: Dziko la Malaŵi; Tumbuka: Charu cha Malaŵi) is a landlocked country in Southeast Africa. It is bordered by Zambia to the west, Tanzania to the north and northeast, and Mozambique to the east, south, and southwest. Malawi spans over 118,484 km^{2} (45,747 sq mi) and has a population of 22,224,282 (as of July 2025). Lilongwe is its capital and largest city.

The part of Africa now known as Malawi was settled around the 10th century by the Akafula, also known as the Abathwa. Later, the Bantu groups came and drove out the Akafula and formed various kingdoms such as the Maravi and Nkhamanga kingdoms, that flourished from the 16th century. The British Empire began to consolidate control of the area following the 1890 British Ultimatum against the Portuguese, who had claimed the area between Angola and Mozambique in the 1885 Pink Map. In 1891, the area was designated by the British as the British Central African Protectorate, renamed Nyasaland in 1907. In 1964, Nyasaland became independent under Prime Minister Hastings Banda and was renamed Malawi. Two years later, Banda became president by converting the country into a one-party presidential republic. Banda was declared president for life in 1971. Malawi's first few decades of independence was characterized by Banda's highly repressive dictatorship. After the introduction of a multi-party system in 1993, Banda lost the 1994 general election, and the country has continued to experience peaceful transitions of power. Malawi has a democratic, multi-party republic headed by an elected president. According to the 2024 V-Dem Democracy indices, Malawi is ranked 74th electoral democracy worldwide and 11th electoral democracy in Africa. The country maintains diplomatic relations with most countries and participates in several international organisations, including the United Nations, the Commonwealth of Nations, the Southern African Development Community, the Common Market for Eastern and Southern Africa, and the African Union.

Malawi is one of the world's least developed countries. Its economy is heavily based on agriculture, and it has a largely rural and growing population. The country has a low life expectancy and high infant mortality. HIV/AIDS is highly prevalent. The diverse population includes native peoples, Asians, and Europeans. The population is predominantly Christian, and the majority are Protestant.

== Etymology ==
The name Malawi means "flames" in Chichewa and Chitumbuka. Malawi was chosen by the first president of Malawi, Hastings Banda, after the country achieved its independence from the United Kingdom in 1964.

== History ==
=== Pre-colonial history ===
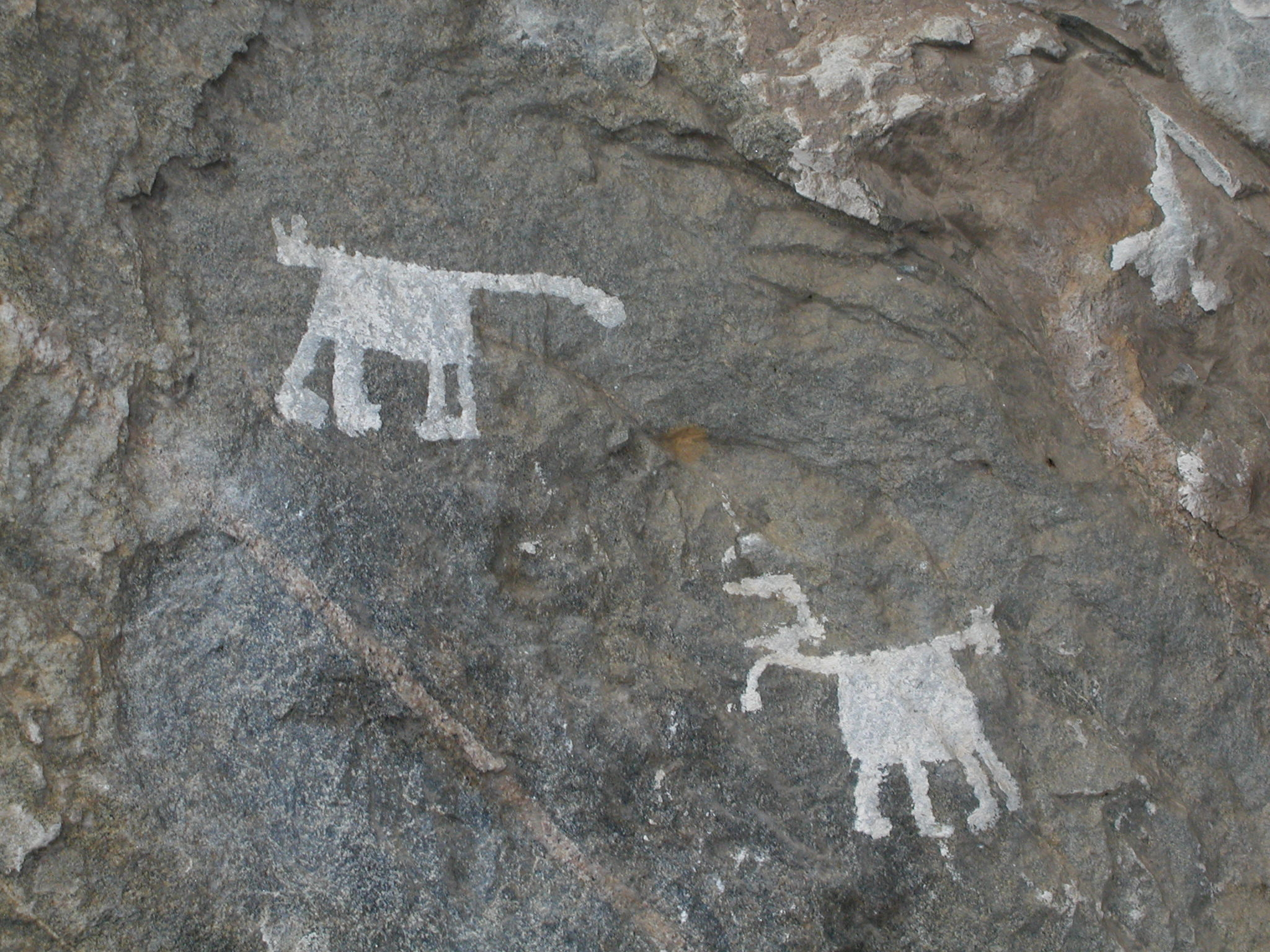
Chongoni Rock Art Area

Before the arrival of the Bantu peoples from the North around the 10th century CE, the part of Africa now known as Malawi had a small population of hunter-gatherers, known in contemporary Malawi oral tradition as Akafula, BaTwa, Akaombe, or Mwandionerakuti. The BaTwa were gradually overtaken by the agrarian Bantu peoples.

Although most of the Bantu peoples continued south, some remained and founded ethnic groups based on common ancestry. By the 16th century, the tribes had established several kingdoms such as the Maravi Empire that reached from north of what became Nkhotakota to the Zambezi River and from Lake Malawi to the Luangwa River in what became Zambia and the Nkhamanga.

In the 17th century, with the area mostly united under one native ruler, native tribesmen began encountering, trading with and making alliances with Portuguese traders and members of the military. By the 18th century, however, the empire had broken up into areas controlled by many individual ethnic groups. The Indian Ocean slave trade reached its height in the mid-19th century, when approximately 20,000 people per year were believed to have been enslaved and transported from Nkhotakota to Kilwa where they were sold.

=== Colonialisation (1859–1960) ===
Missionary and explorer David Livingstone reached Lake Malawi (then Lake Nyasa) in 1859 and identified the Shire Highlands south of the lake as an area suitable for European settlement. As the result of Livingstone's visit, several Anglican and Presbyterian missions were established in the area in the 1860s and 1870s. The African Lakes Company Limited was established in 1878 to set up a trade and transport, a small mission and trading settlement were established at Blantyre in 1876, and a British consul took up residence there in 1883. The Portuguese government was also interested in the area, so, to prevent Portuguese occupation, the British government sent Harry Johnston as consul with instructions to make treaties with local rulers beyond Portuguese jurisdiction.

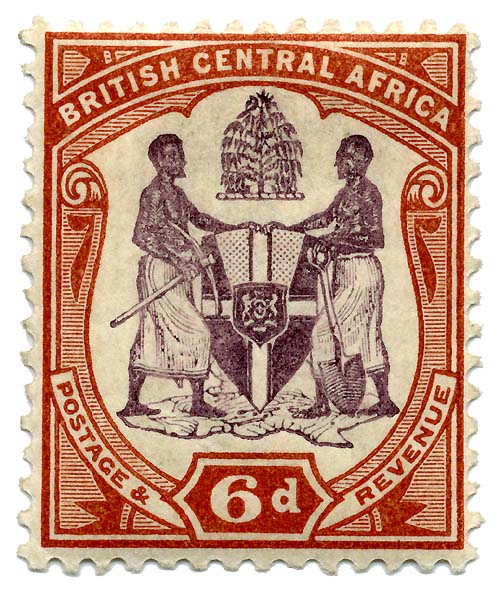
1897 British Central Africa stamp issued by the United Kingdom

In 1889, a British protectorate was proclaimed over the Shire Highlands, which was extended in 1891 to include the whole of present-day Malawi as the British Central Africa Protectorate. In 1907, the protectorate was renamed Nyasaland, a name it retained for the remainder of its time under British rule. In an example of what is sometimes called the "Thin White Line" of colonial authority in Africa, the colonial government of Nyasaland was formed in 1891. The administrators were given a budget of £10,000 (1891 nominal value) per year, which was enough to employ ten European civilians, two military officers, 70 Punjabi Sikhs, and 85 Zanzibar porters. These few employees were then expected to administer and police a territory of around 94,000 square kilometres with between one and two million people.

In 1944, the Nyasaland African Congress (NAC) was formed to promote local interests to the British government. In 1953, Britain linked Nyasaland with Northern and Southern Rhodesia in what was the Federation of Rhodesia and Nyasaland, often called the Central African Federation (CAF), for mainly political reasons. Even though the federation was semi-independent, the linking provoked opposition from African nationalists, and the NAC gained popular support. An influential opponent of the CAF was Hastings Banda, a European-trained doctor working in Ghana who was persuaded to return to Nyasaland in 1958 to assist the nationalist cause. Banda was elected president of the NAC and worked to mobilize nationalist sentiment before being jailed by colonial authorities in 1959. He was released in 1960 and was asked to help draft a new constitution for Nyasaland, with a clause granting Africans the majority in the colony's Legislative Council.

=== Banda era (1961–1993) ===
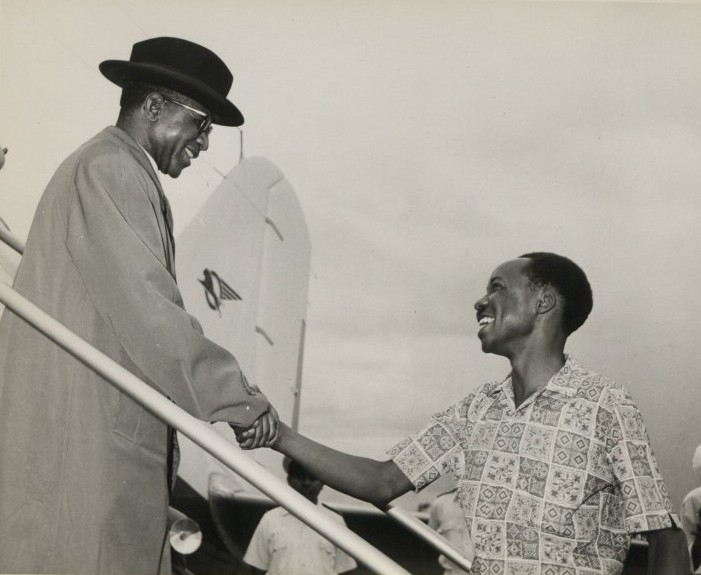
Malawi's first Prime Minister and later the first President, Hastings Banda (left), with Tanzania's President Julius Nyerere (right)

In 1961, Banda's Malawi Congress Party (MCP) gained a majority in the Legislative Council elections, and Banda became Prime Minister in 1963. The federation was dissolved in 1963, and on 6 July 1964, Nyasaland became independent from British rule and renamed itself Malawi, and that is commemorated as the nation's Independence Day, a public holiday. Under a new constitution, Malawi became a republic in 1966 with Banda as its first president. The new government formally made Malawi a one-party state with the MCP as the only legal party.

In 1971, Banda was declared president for life. For almost 30 years, Banda presided over a rigidly totalitarian regime, which ensured that Malawi did not suffer armed conflict. Opposition parties, including the Malawi Freedom Movement of Orton Chirwa and the Socialist League of Malawi, were founded in exile.

=== Multi-party democracy (1993–present) ===
Under pressure for increased political freedom, Banda agreed to a referendum in 1993, where the populace voted for a multi-party system. In late 1993, a presidential council was formed, the life presidency was abolished, and a new constitution was put into place, effectively ending the MCP's rule. In 1994 the first multi-party elections were held, and Banda was defeated by Bakili Muluzi (a former secretary general of the MCP and former Banda Cabinet minister). Re-elected in 1999, Muluzi remained president until Bingu wa Mutharika was elected in the 2004 Malawian general election. Although the political environment was described as "challenging", it was stated in 2009 that a multi-party system still existed in Malawi. Elections were held in 2009, and Mutharika was successfully re-elected, despite allegations of electoral fraud from the opposition and observers.

Mutharika was seen by some as increasingly autocratic and dismissive of human rights, and in July 2011 protests over high costs of living, devolving foreign relations, poor governance and a lack of foreign exchange reserves erupted. The protests left 18 people dead and at least 44 others suffering from gunshot wounds.

In April 2012, Mutharika died of a heart attack. Over a period of 48 hours, his death was kept secret, including an elaborate flight with the body to South Africa, where the ambulance drivers refused to move the body, saying they were not licensed to move a corpse. After the South African government threatened to reveal the information, the presidential title was taken over by Vice-President Joyce Banda (no relation to Hastings Banda).

In the 2014 Malawian general election, Banda lost the elections (coming in third) and was replaced by Peter Mutharika, the brother of ex-President Bingu wa Mutharika. In the 2019 Malawian general election Mutharika was narrowly re-elected. In February 2020 Malawi Constitutional Court overturned the result because of irregularities and widespread fraud. In May 2020 Malawi Supreme Court upheld the decision and announced a new election was to be held on 2 July of the same year. This was the first time an election in the country was legally challenged. Opposition leader Lazarus Chakwera won the 2020 Malawian presidential election. Mutharika returned to power in the 2025 Malawian general election.

== Government and politics ==
Malawi is a unitary presidential republic under the leadership of President Peter Mutharika since 2025. The current constitution was put into place on 18 May 1995. The branches of the government consist of executive, legislative, and judicial. The executive includes a president who is both head of state and head of government, first and second vice presidents, and the Cabinet of Malawi. The president and vice president are elected together every five years. A second vice president may be appointed by the president if so chosen, although they must be from a different party. The president appoints the members of the Cabinet, and they can be from inside or outside of the legislature.

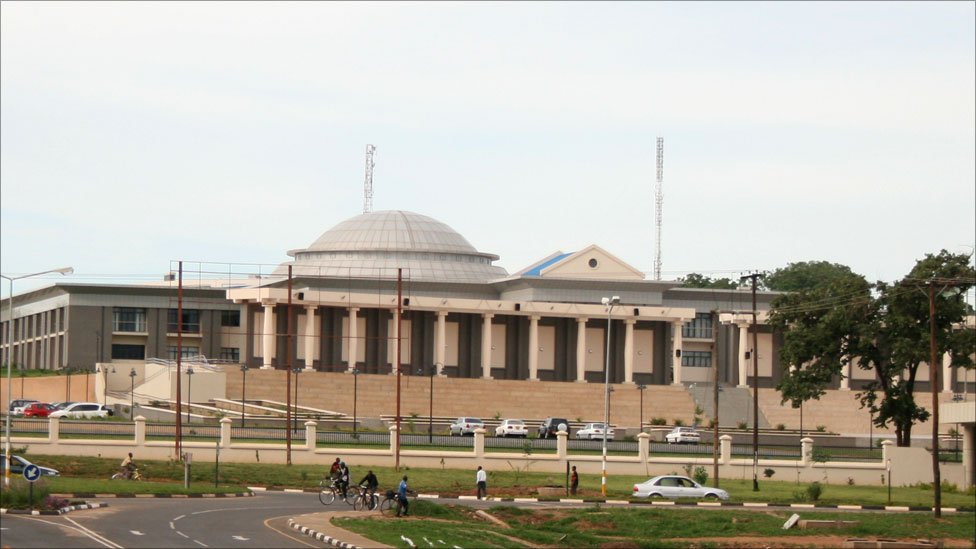
National Assembly building in Lilongwe

The legislative branch consists of a unicameral National Assembly of 193 members who are elected every five years, and although the Malawian constitution provides for a Senate of 80 seats, one does not exist in practice. If created, the Senate would provide representation for traditional leaders and a variety of geographic districts, as well as special interest groups, including the disabled, youth, and women. Since 2025, the Democratic Progressive Party (DPP) is the ruling party led by Peter Mutharika, while the Malawi Congress Party (MCP) is the main opposition party. Suffrage is universal at 18 years of age, and the central government budget for 2021/2022 is $2.4 billion from $2.8 billion for the 2020/2021 financial year.

The independent judicial branch is based upon the English model and consists of a Supreme Court of Appeal, a High Court divided into three sections (general, constitutional, and commercial), an Industrial Relations Court and Magistrates Courts, the last of which is divided into five grades and includes Child Justice Courts. The judicial system has been modified several times since the country's independence in 1964. Conventional courts and traditional courts have been used in varying combinations, with varying degrees of success and corruption.

Malawi is composed of three regions (the Northern, Central, and Southern regions), which are divided into 28 districts, and further into approximately 250 traditional authorities and 110 administrative wards. Local government is administered by central government-appointed regional administrators and district commissioners. For the first time in the multi-party era, local elections took place on 21 November 2000, with the UDF party winning 70% of the available seats. There was scheduled to be a second round of constitutionally mandated local elections in May 2005, but these were cancelled by the government.

In 2012, Malawi was ranked 7th of all countries in sub-Saharan Africa in the Ibrahim Index of African Governance, an index that measures several variables. Although the country's governance score was higher than the continental average, it was lower than the regional average for southern Africa. Its highest scores were for safety and rule of law, and its lowest scores were for sustainable economic opportunity, with a ranking of 47th on the continent for educational opportunities. Malawi's governance score had improved between 2000 and 2011.

=== Administrative divisions ===
A clickable map of Malawi exhibiting its 28 districts.

Malawi is divided into 28 districts within three regions:

Central Region

- 1 – Dedza
- 2 – Dowa
- 3 – Kasungu
- 4 – Lilongwe
- 5 – Mchinji
- 6 – Nkhotakhota
- 7 – Ntcheu
- 8 – Ntchisi
- 9 – Salima

Northern Region

- 10 – Chitipa
- 11 – Karonga
- 12 – Likoma
- 13 – Mzimba
- 14 – Nkhata Bay
- 15 – Rumphi

Southern Region

- 16 – Balaka
- 17 – Blantyre
- 18 – Chikwawa
- 19 – Chiradzulu
- 20 – Machinga
- 21 – Mangochi
- 22 – Mulanje
- 23 – Mwanza
- 24 – Nsanje
- 25 – Thyolo
- 26 – Phalombe
- 27 – Zomba
- 28 – Neno

=== Foreign relations ===
Banda established a pro-Western foreign policy that continued into early 2011. It included good diplomatic relationships with many Western countries. The transition from a one-party state to a multi-party democracy strengthened ties with the United States. Significant numbers of students from Malawi travel to the U.S. for schooling, and the U.S. has active branches of the Peace Corps, the Centers for Disease Control and Prevention, the Department of Health and Human Services, and the Agency for International Development in Malawi.

Malawi maintained close relations with South Africa throughout the apartheid era, which strained its relationships with other African countries. Following the collapse of apartheid in 1994, diplomatic relationships were made and maintained into 2011 between Malawi and all other African countries. In 2010, however, Malawi's relationship with Mozambique became strained, partially due to disputes over the use of the Zambezi River and an inter-country electrical grid. In 2007, Malawi established diplomatic ties with China, and Chinese investment in the country has continued to increase since then, despite concerns regarding the treatment of workers by Chinese companies and competition of Chinese business with local companies. In 2011, a document was released in which the British ambassador to Malawi criticised President Mutharika. Mutharika expelled the ambassador, and in July 2011 the UK announced that it was suspending all budgetary aid because of Mutharika's lack of response to criticisms of his government and economic mismanagement. The United States followed suit, freezing a US$350 million grant, citing concerns regarding the government's suppression and intimidation of demonstrators and civic groups, as well as restriction of the press and police violence.

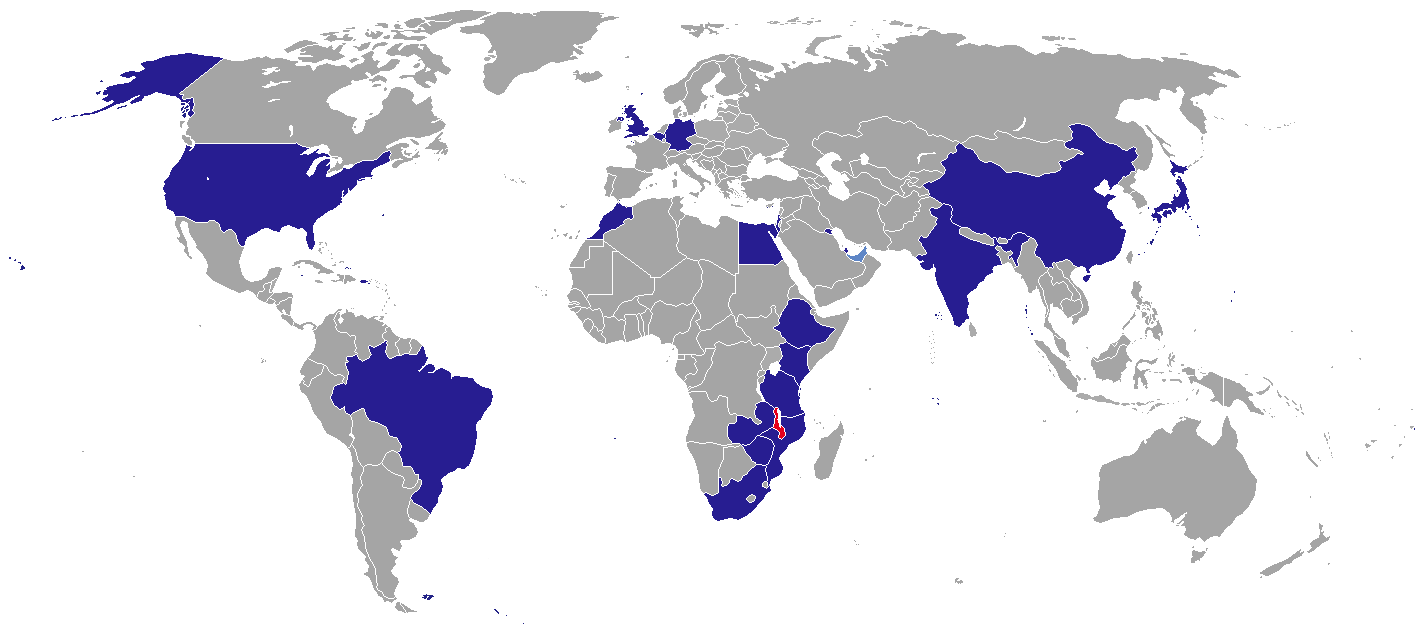
Locations of Malawian diplomatic embassies or high commissions as of 2012

Malawi has been seen as a haven for refugees from other African countries, including Mozambique and Rwanda, since 1985. These influxes of refugees have placed a strain on the economy but have also drawn significant inflows of aid from other countries. Donors to Malawi include the United States, Canada, and Germany, as well as international institutions such as the World Bank, the International Monetary Fund, the European Union, the African Development Bank, and UN organizations. Malawi is a member of several international organizations, including the Commonwealth, the UN and some of its child agencies, the IMF, the World Bank, the African Union, and the World Health Organization. The country was the first in southern Africa to receive peacekeeping training under the African Crisis Response Initiative.

=== Human rights ===
Malawi is the 79th most peaceful country in the world (of 163), according to the 2024 Global Peace Index. As of 2017, international observers noted issues in several human rights areas. Excessive force was seen to be used by police forces and security forces with impunity, mob violence was occasionally seen, and prison conditions continued to be harsh and sometimes life-threatening. However, the government was seen to make some effort to prosecute security forces who used excessive force. Other legal issues included limits on free speech and freedom of the press, lengthy pretrial detentions, and arbitrary arrests and detentions. Corruption within the government is seen as a major issue, despite the Malawi Anti-Corruption Bureau's attempts to reduce it. Corruption within security forces is also an issue. Malawi had one of the highest rates of child marriage in the world. In 2015 the legal age for marriage was raised from 15 to 18.

Societal issues found included violence against women, human trafficking, and child labour. Other issues that have been raised are lack of adequate legal protection of women from sexual abuse and harassment, very high maternal mortality rate, and abuse related to accusations of witchcraft. In 2010, a couple perceived as homosexual (a man and a trans woman) faced extensive prison sentences when convicted. The convicted pair, sentenced to the maximum of 14 years of hard labour each, were pardoned two weeks later following the intervention of United Nations Secretary General Ban Ki-moon. In May 2012, President Joyce Banda pledged to repeal laws criminalising homosexuality. Peter Mutharika imposed a moratorium in 2015 that suspended the country's anti-gay laws pending further review of the same laws. On 26 June 2021, the country's LGBT community held the first pride parade in Lilongwe.

== Geography ==
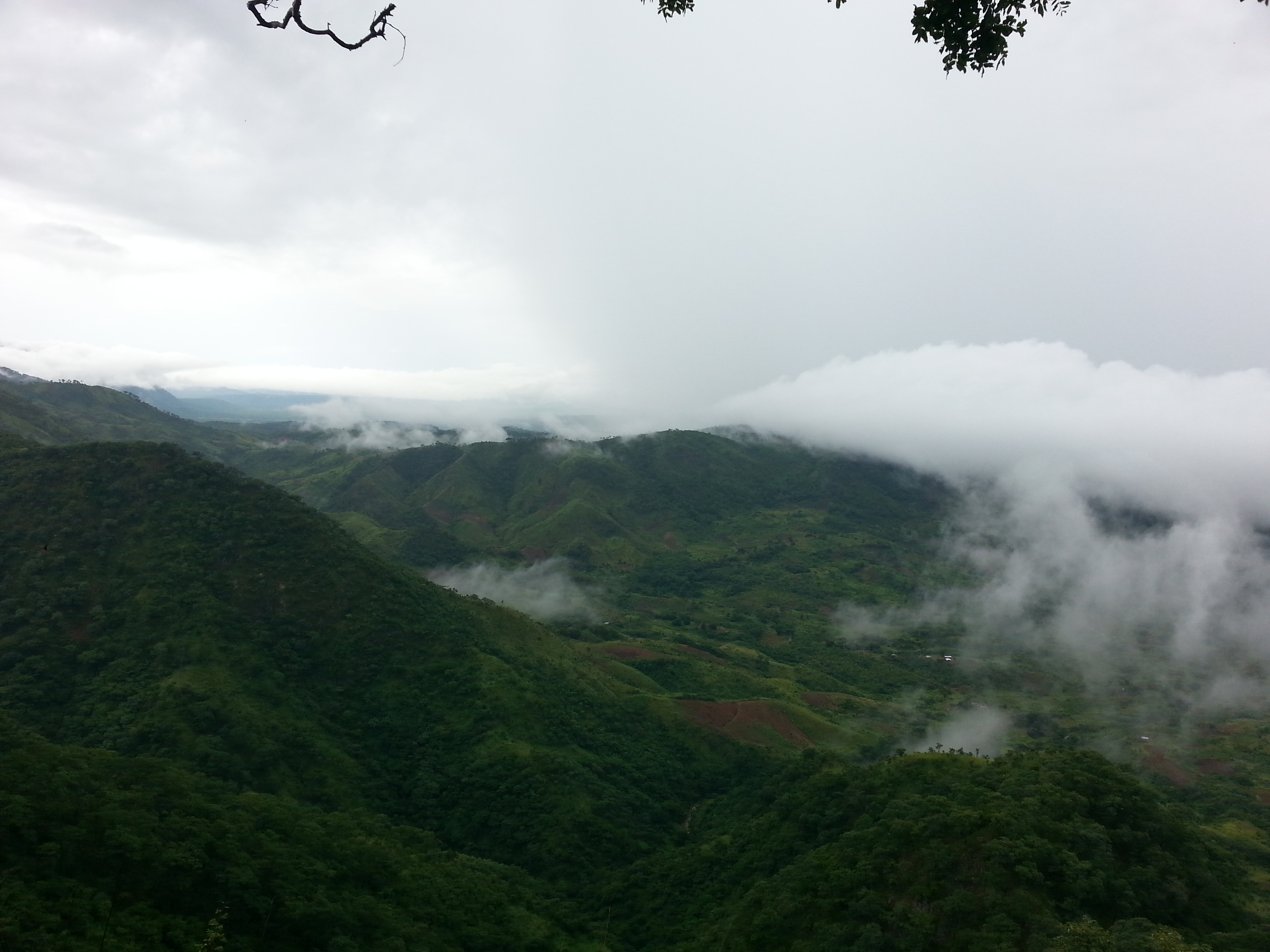
Mountains in Northern Malawi during the rainy season

Malawi is a landlocked country in Southeast Africa, bordered by Zambia to the northwest, Tanzania to the northeast, and Mozambique to the south, southwest, and east. It lies between latitudes 9° and 18°S, and longitudes 32° and 36°E. The Great Rift Valley runs through the country from north to south, and to the east of the valley lies Lake Malawi (also called Lake Nyasa), making up over three-quarters of Malawi's eastern boundary. Lake Malawi is sometimes called the Calendar Lake as it is about 365 miles (587 km) long and 52 miles (84 km) wide. The Shire River flows from the south end of the lake and joins the Zambezi 400 kilometres (250 mi) farther south in Mozambique.

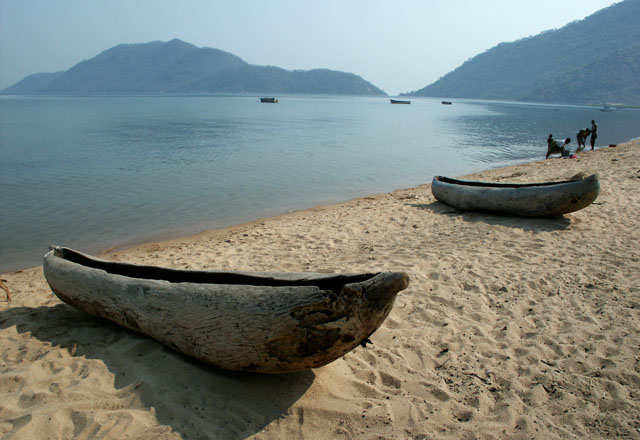
Lake Malawi

In the mountainous sections surrounding the Rift Valley, plateaus rise generally 914 to 1,219 metres (3,000 to 4,000 ft) above sea level, although some rise as high as 2,438 metres (8,000 ft) in the north. To the south of Lake Malawi lies the Shire Highlands, gently rolling land at approximately 914 metres (3,000 ft) above sea level. In this area, the Zomba and Mulanje mountain peaks rise to respective heights of 2,134 and 3,048 metres (7,000 and 10,000 ft).

Malawi's capital is Lilongwe, and its commercial centre is Blantyre, with a population of over 500,000 people in 2006. Malawi has two sites listed on the UNESCO World Heritage List. Lake Malawi National Park was first listed in 1984, and the Chongoni Rock Art Area was listed in 2006.

Malawi's climate is hot in the low-lying areas in the south of the country and temperate in the northern highlands. The altitude moderates what would otherwise be an equatorial climate. Between November and April, the temperature is warm with equatorial rains and thunderstorms, with the storms reaching their peak severity in late March. After March, the rainfall rapidly diminishes, and from May to September, wet mists float from the highlands into the plateaus, with almost no rainfall during these months.

=== Flora and fauna ===
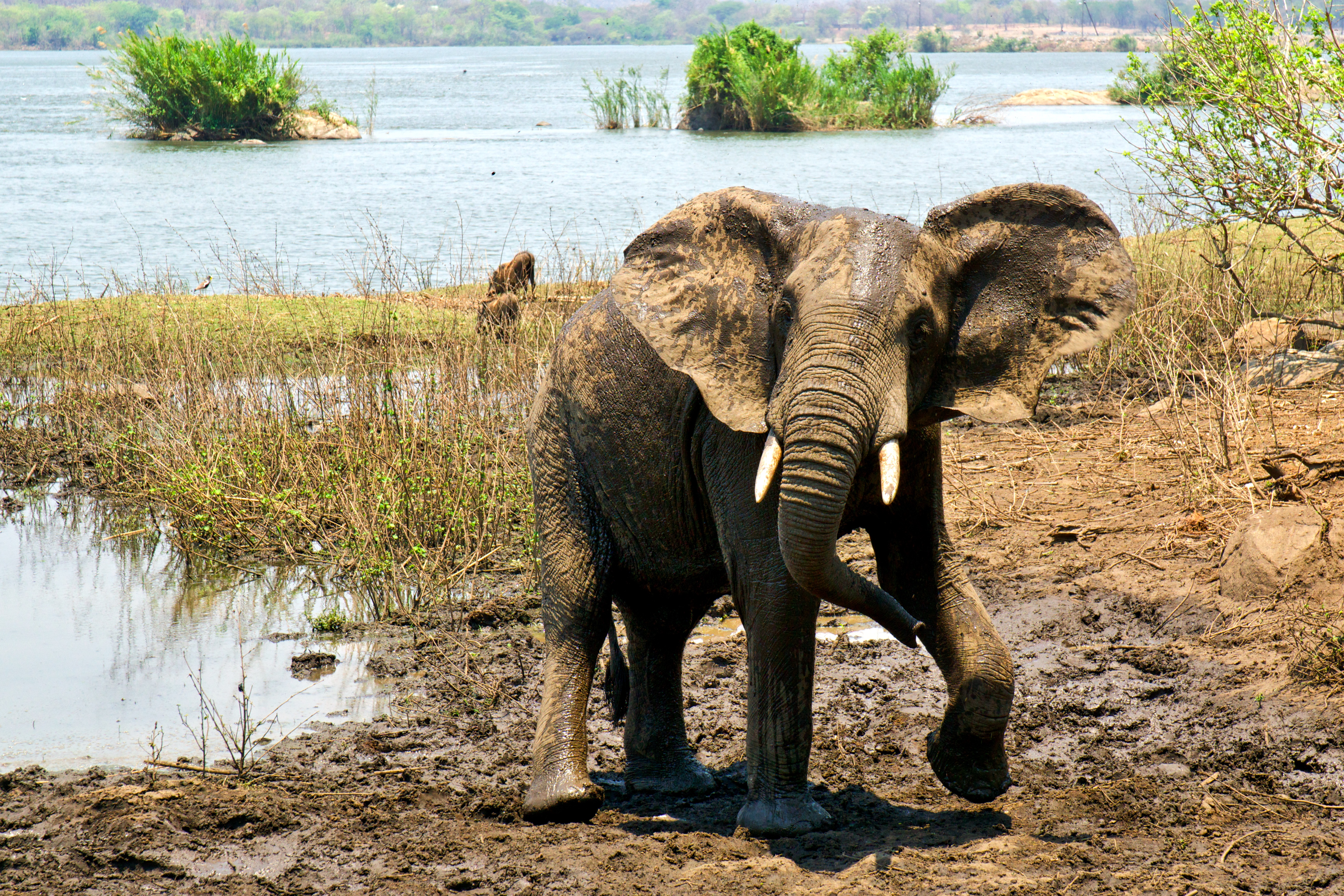
Elephant in Majete Wildlife Reserve

Animal life indigenous to Malawi includes mammals such as elephants, hippos, antelopes, buffaloes, big cats, monkeys, rhinos, and bats; a great variety of birds, including birds of prey, parrots, and falcons; waterfowl and large waders; and owls and songbirds. Lake Malawi has been described as having one of the richest lake fish faunas in the world, being the home for some 200 mammals, 650 birds, 30+ mollusks, and 5,500+ plant species.

Seven terrestrial ecoregions lie within Malawi's borders: Central Zambezian miombo woodlands, Eastern miombo woodlands, Southern miombo woodlands, Zambezian and mopane woodlands, Zambezian flooded grasslands, South Malawi montane forest-grassland mosaic, and Southern Rift montane forest-grassland mosaic. There are five national parks, four wildlife and game reserves and two other protected areas. The 2019 Forest Landscape Integrity Index mean score was 5.74/10, ranking it 96th globally out of 172 countries.

== Economy ==
Crafts market in Lilongwe

Malawi is among the world's least developed countries. Around 85% of the population lives in rural areas. The economy is based on agriculture, and more than one-third of GDP and 90% of export revenues come from this. In the past, the economy has been dependent on substantial economic aid from the World Bank, the International Monetary Fund (IMF), and other countries. Malawi was ranked the 119th safest investment destination in the world in the March 2011 Euromoney Country Risk rankings. The government faces challenges in developing a market economy, improving environmental protection, dealing with the rapidly growing HIV/AIDS problem, improving the education system, and satisfying its foreign donors to become financially independent.

In December 2000, the IMF stopped aid disbursements due to corruption concerns, and many individual donors followed, resulting in an almost 80% drop in the development budget. However, in 2005, Malawi was the recipient of over US$575 million in aid. Many analysts believe that economic progress for Malawi depends on its ability to control population growth. A 2009 purchase of a private presidential jet followed almost immediately by a nationwide fuel shortage, which was officially blamed on logistical problems, was more likely due to the hard currency shortage caused by the jet purchase.

In addition, some setbacks have been experienced, and Malawi has lost some of its ability to pay for imports due to a general shortage of foreign exchange, as investment fell 23% in 2009. There are many investment barriers which the government has failed to address, including high service costs and poor infrastructure for power, water, and telecommunications. As of 2017, it was estimated that Malawi had a purchasing power parity (PPP) of $22.42 billion, with a per capita GDP of $1200, and inflation estimated at 12.2% in 2017.

Agriculture accounts for 35% of GDP, industry for 19%, and services for the remaining 46%. Malawi has one of the lowest per capita incomes in the world. The poverty rate is decreasing through the work of the government and supporting organisations, with people living under the poverty line decreasing from 54% in 1990 to 40% in 2006, and the percentage of "ultra-poor" decreasing from 24% in 1990 to 15% in 2007. In January 2015, southern Malawi was hit by floods. These floods affected more than a million people across the country, including 336,000 who were displaced, according to UNICEF. Over 100 people were killed, and an estimated 64,000 hectares of cropland were washed away.

=== Agriculture and industry ===
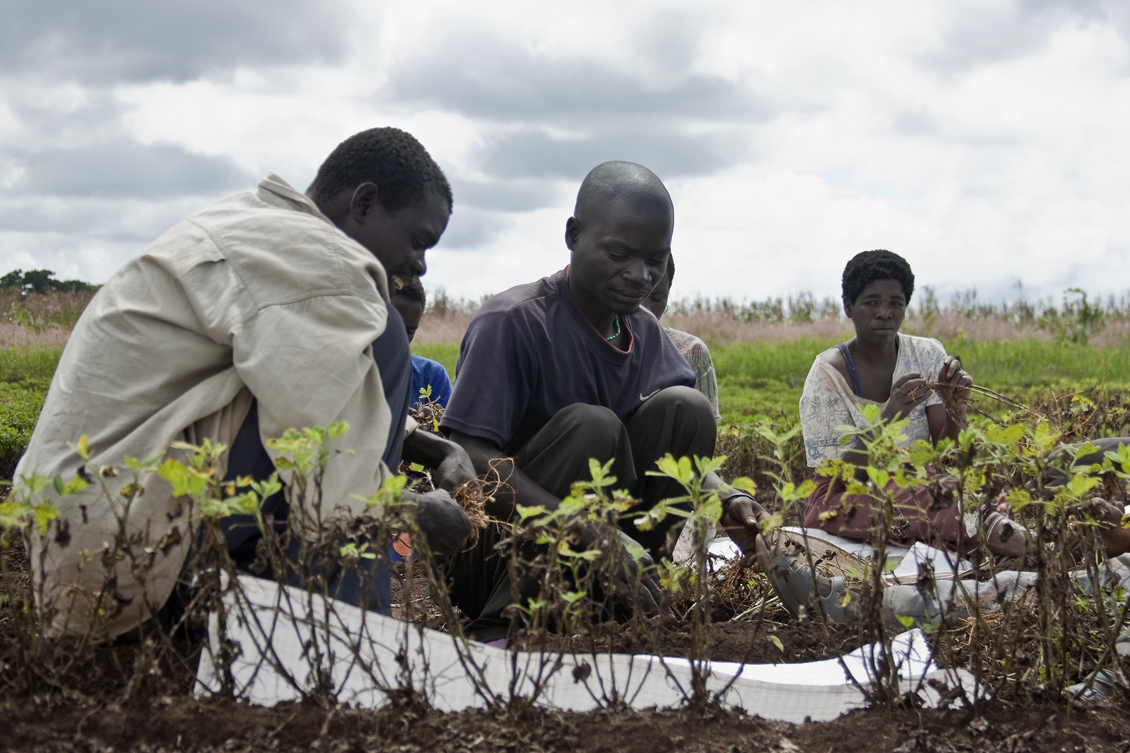
Harvesting groundnuts at an agricultural research station in Malawi

The economy is predominantly agricultural. Over 80% of the population is engaged in subsistence farming, even though agriculture only contributed to 27% of GDP in 2013. The services sector accounts for more than half of GDP (54%), compared to 11% for manufacturing and 8% for other industries, including natural uranium mining. Malawi invests more in agriculture (as a share of GDP) than any other African country: 28% of GDP.

Beginning in 2006, the country began mixing unleaded petrol with 10% ethanol, produced in-country at two plants, to reduce dependence on imported fuel. In 2006, in response to low agricultural harvests, Malawi began a programme of fertilizer subsidies, the Fertiliser Input Subsidy Programme (FISP). It has been reported that this programme, championed by the country's president, is causing Malawi to become a net exporter of food to nearby countries. The FISP ended with President Mutharika's death. In 2020, the programme was replaced with the Affordable Inputs Program (AIP), which extends the subsidy on maize seed and fertiliser to sorghum and rice seed.

The main agricultural products include tobacco, sugarcane, cotton, tea, corn, potatoes, sorghum, cattle, and goats. The main industries are tobacco, tea, and sugar processing, sawmill products, cement, and consumer goods. The industrial production growth rate is estimated at 10% (2009). The country makes no significant use of natural gas. As of 2008, Malawi does not import or export any electricity but does import all its petroleum, with no production in the country. In 2008, Malawi began testing cars that run solely on ethanol, and the country is continuing to increase its use of ethanol.

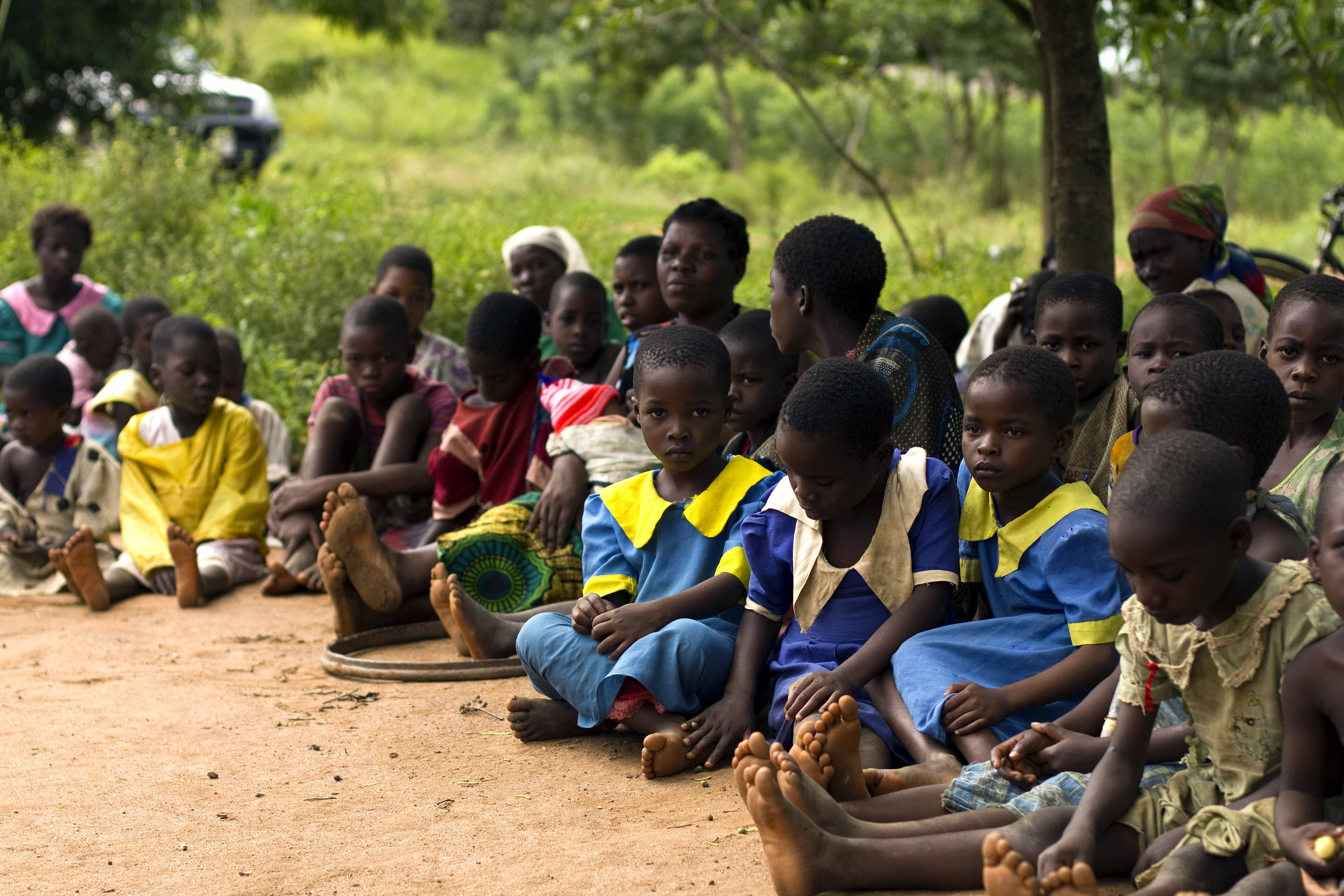
Children attending a farmer meeting in Nalifu village, Mulanje

As of 2009, Malawi exports an estimated US$945 million in goods per year. Tobacco's world prices declined, and the international community increases pressure to limit tobacco production. Dependence on tobacco is growing, with the product jumping from 53% to 70% of export revenues between 2007 and 2008. Tea, tobacco, sugar, and coffee make up more than 90% of export revenue. Due to a rise in costs and a decline in sales prices, Malawi is encouraging farmers away from tobacco towards more profitable crops, including spices such as paprika. The move away from tobacco is further fueled by likely World Health Organisation moves against the particular type of tobacco that Malawi produces, burley leaf, which is more harmful to human health than other tobacco products. India hemp is another possible alternative, but arguments have been made that it will bring more crime through its resemblance to varieties of cannabis used as a recreational drug and the difficulty in distinguishing between the two types. The cultivation of Malawian cannabis, known as Malawi Gold, as a drug has increased significantly. Malawi is known for growing "the best and finest" cannabis in the world for recreational drug use, according to a recent World Bank report, and cultivation and sales of the crop may contribute to corruption within the police force.

GDP in Southern African Development Community countries by economic sector, 2013 or closest year

Other exported goods are cotton, peanuts, wood products, and apparel. The destinations for exports are South Africa, Germany, Egypt, Zimbabwe, the United States, Russia, and the Netherlands. Malawi currently imports an estimated US$1.625 billion in goods per year, with the main commodities being food, petroleum products, consumer goods, and transportation equipment. Main importing countries are South Africa, India, Zambia, Tanzania, the US, and China.

In 2016, Malawi was hit by a drought, and in January 2017 there was an outbreak of armyworms around Zomba. The moth is capable of wiping out entire fields of corn, the staple grain of residents. Agriculture minister George Chaponda reported that 2,000 hectares of crop had been destroyed, having spread to nine of 28 districts.

=== Infrastructure ===
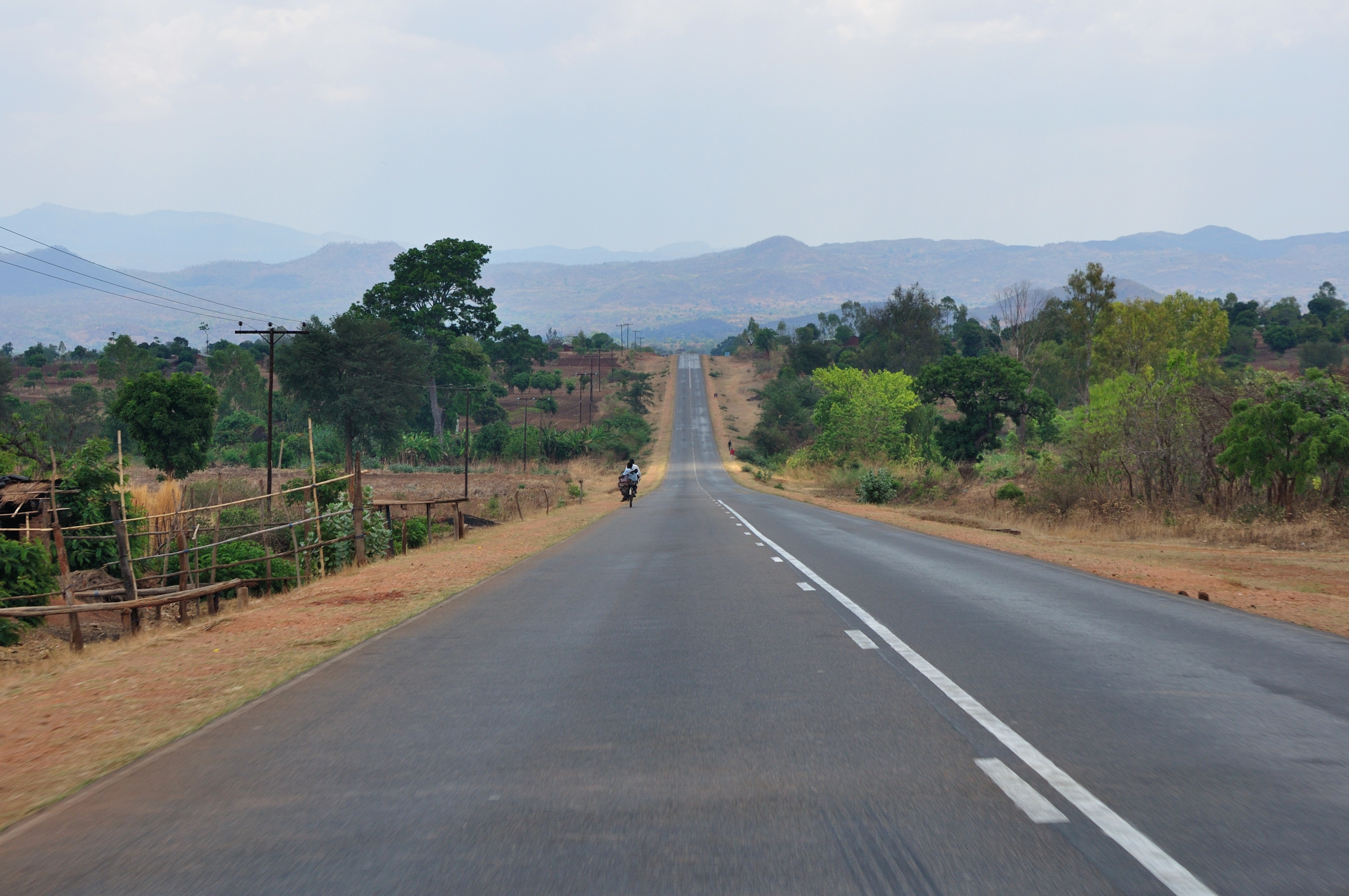
The M1 road between Blantyre and Lilongwe

As of 2012, Malawi has 31 airports, seven with paved runways (two international airports) and 24 with unpaved runways. As of 2008, there are 797 kilometres (495 mi) of railways, all narrow-gauge, and, as of 2003, 24,866 kilometres (15,451 mi) of roadways in various conditions, 6,956 kilometres (4,322 mi) paved and 8,495 kilometres (5,279 mi) unpaved. Malawi also has 700 kilometres (430 mi) of waterways on Lake Malawi and along the Shire River.

As of 2022, there were 10.23 million mobile phone connections. There were 4.03 million Internet users in 2022. There is one government-run radio station (Malawi Broadcasting Corporation) and approximately a dozen more owned by private enterprises. In the past, Malawi's telecommunications system has been named as some of the poorest in Africa, but conditions are improving, with 130,000 land line telephones being connected between 2000 and 2007. Telephones are much more accessible in urban areas, with less than a quarter of land lines being in rural areas.

=== Research trends ===
Scientific publication trends in the most productive SADC countries, 2005–2014

Malawi devoted 1.06% of GDP to research and development in 2010, according to a survey by the Department of Science and Technology, one of the highest ratios in Africa. This corresponds to $7.8 per person (in current purchasing parity dollars).

In 2014, Malawian scientists had the third-largest output in Southern Africa, in terms of articles cataloged in international journals. They published 322 articles in Thomson Reuters' Web of Science that year, almost triple the number in 2005 (116). Malawi was ranked 125th in the Global Innovation Index in 2025.

=== Policy framework ===
Malawi's first science and technology policy dates from 1991 and was revised in 2002. The National Science and Technology Policy of 2002 envisaged the establishment of a National Commission for Science and Technology to advise the government and other stakeholders on science and technology-led development. Although the Science and Technology Act of 2003 made provision for the creation of this commission, it only became operational in 2011, with a secretariat resulting from the merger of the Department of Science and Technology and the National Research Council. The Science and Technology Act of 2003 also established a Science and Technology Fund to finance research and studies through government grants and loans but, as of 2014, this was not yet operational.

In 2012, most foreign investments flowed to infrastructure (62%) and the energy sector (33%). The government has introduced a series of fiscal incentives, including tax breaks, to attract more foreign investors. In 2013, the Malawi Investment and Trade Centre put together an investment portfolio spanning 20 companies. In 2013, the government adopted a National Export Strategy to diversify the country's exports. Production facilities are to be established for a wide range of products within the three selected clusters: oilseed products, sugar cane products, and manufacturing.

=== Women ===
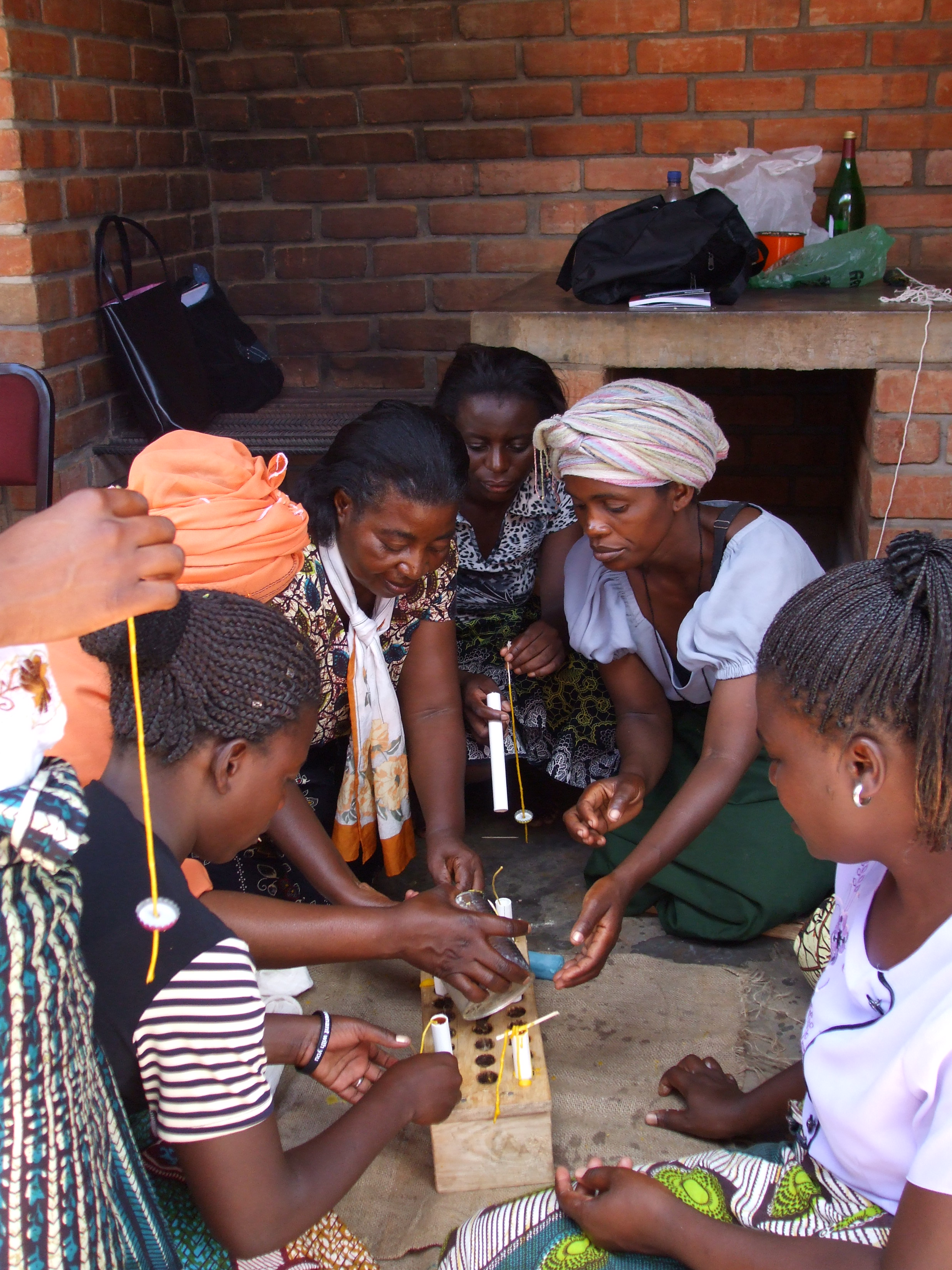
Mbawemi Women's group in Malawi learning how to make beeswax into candles

The ratio of male to female students shows women's access to schooling starts on a par with men's. Female students see consistent declines as age increases. The life expectancy of women was 68 in 2024. The maternal mortality rate in Malawi is particularly low compared with countries at similar levels of development.

The inheritance rights are equal by gender for children and for surviving spouses. A higher percentage of the male population is employed, and the female population has a higher total employed population and a very similar unemployment rate. This gap continues with wages.

Women's participation in national politics has been shown to be weaker than men's. Female participation in politics is further restricted by gatekeepers, who provide access to the resources needed to win elections and maintain seats in parliament. Limited participation correlates to limited numbers of women in politics. The national parliament has appointed female members to seats in the body, and over 20% of the seats in parliament are held by women.

== Demographics ==
=== Population ===
Malawi has a population of over 19 million, with a growth rate of 3.32%, according to 2021 estimates. The population is forecast to grow to over 47 million people by 2050, nearly tripling the estimated 16 million in 2010.

=== Cities ===
Largest cities or towns in Malawi According to the 2018 Census
Rank	Name	Region	Pop.
1	Lilongwe	Central	989,318
2	Blantyre	Southern	800,264
3	Mzuzu	Northern	221,272
4	Zomba	Southern	105,013
5	Karonga	Northern	61,609
6	Kasungu	Central	58,653
7	Mangochi	Southern	53,498
8	Salima	Central	36,789
9	Liwonde	Southern	36,421
10	Balaka	Southern	36,308

=== Ethnic groups ===
Ethnic groups in Malawi (2018 census)
Ethnic groups	per cent
Chewa	34.4%
Lomwe	18.9%
Yao	14.3%
Tumbuka	22.2%
Sena	3.8%
Mang'anja	3.2%
Nyanja	1.9%
Tonga	1.8%
Ngonde	1%
Lambya	0.6%
Sukwa	0.5%
Other	1.1%

The population is made up of the Chewa, Tumbuka, Yao, Lomwe, Sena, Tonga, Ngoni, and Ngonde native ethnic groups, as well as populations of Chinese and Europeans.

=== Languages ===
Languages of Malawi (2018 Census)
Languages	per cent
Chewa	42.2%
Tumbuka	33.8%
Yao	12.1%
Sena	9.7%
Lomwe	7.3%
Tonga	1.2%
Nkhonde	0.9%
Lambya	0.4%
Nyakyusa	0.2%
English	0.2%
Other	1.1%

The official language is English. The country does not have a declared national language per its constitution but considers several major languages as regional which include Chichewa (42.5%), Chitumbuka (31.2%), and Chiyao (13.7%). Other native languages are Malawian Lomwe, spoken by around 250,000 in the southeast; Kokola, spoken by around 200,000 people also in the southeast; Lambya, spoken by around 45,000 in the northwestern tip; Ndali, spoken by around 70,000; Nyakyusa-Ngonde, spoken by around 300,000 in the north; Malawian Sena, spoken by around 270,000 in the south; and Tonga, spoken by around 170,000 in Nkhata-Bay District.

All students in public elementary school receive instruction in Chichewa. Students in private elementary schools, however, receive instruction in English if they follow the American or British curriculum.

=== Religion ===
Religion in Malawi (2018)
1. Christianity (77.3%)
2. Islam (13.8%)
3. Traditional (1.10%)
4. Other or none (7.80%)

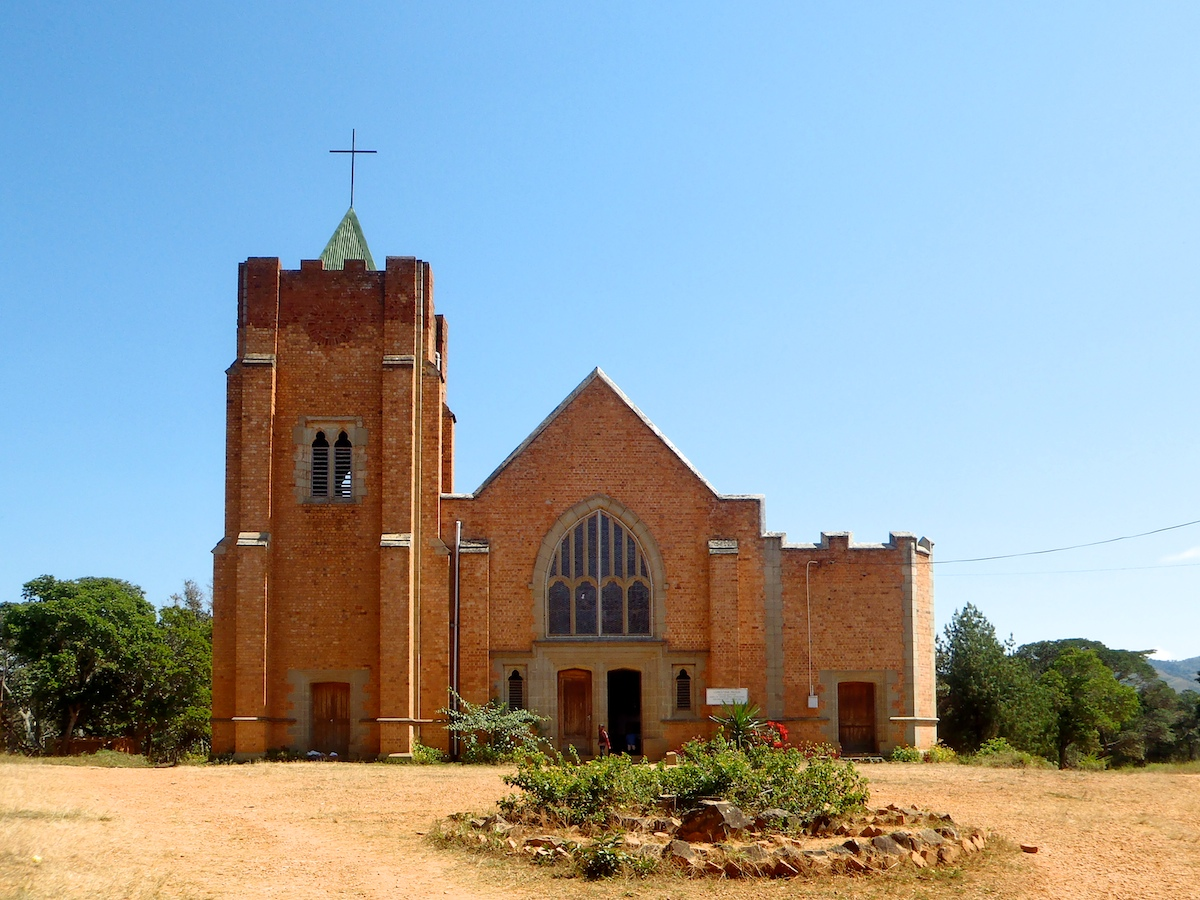
Mission Church in Livingstonia

Government surveys indicate that 87% of the country is Christian, with a minority 11.6% Muslim population. The largest Christian groups are the Roman Catholic Church, of which 19% of Malawians are adherents, and the Church of Central Africa Presbyterian to which 18% belong. Other Protestant denominations include the Reformed Presbyterian Church of Malawi, Evangelical Presbyterian Church of Malawi, Anglicans, Baptists, evangelicals, Seventh-day Adventists, and Lutherans.

Most of the Muslim population is Sunni, of either the Qadriya or Sukkutu groups. Other religious groups within the country include Jehovah's Witnesses (over 100,000), The Church of Jesus Christ of Latter-day Saints, with over 2,000 members, Rastafari, Hindus, and Baháʼís (0.2%). Atheists make up around 4% of the population, although the number may include people who practice traditional African religions that do not have any gods.

=== Health ===
The public sector offers free health services and medicines, while non-government organizations offers services and medicines for fees. Private doctors offer fee-based services and medicines. Health insurance schemes have been established since 2000. The country has a pharmaceutical manufacturing industry consisting of four privately owned pharmaceutical companies. Some of the major health facilities in the country are Blantyre Adventist Hospital, Mwaiwathu Private Hospital, and Kamuzu Central Hospitals.

Infant mortality rates are high, and life expectancy at birth is 50.03 years. Abortion is illegal in Malawi, except to save the mother's life. The Penal Code punishes women who seek illegal or clinical abortion with 7 years in prison, and 14 years for those perform the abortion. There is a high adult prevalence rate of HIV/AIDS, with an estimated 1,006,633 people (94% of whom are adults aged over 15) living with the disease in 2022. There were approximately 11,931 deaths from HIV/AIDS, and 440,000 children orphaned because of the disease (2022). Approximately 250 new people are infected each day, and at least 70% of hospital beds are occupied by HIV/AIDS patients. The high rate of infection has resulted in an estimated 5.8% of the farm labour force dying of the disease. The government spends over $120,000 each year on funerals for civil servants who die of the disease.

There is a very high degree of risk for infectious diseases, including bacterial and protozoal diarrhoea, hepatitis A, typhoid fever, malaria, plague, schistosomiasis, and rabies. Over the years, Malawi has decreased child mortality and the incidences of HIV/AIDS, malaria and other diseases; however, the country has been "performing dismally" on reducing maternal mortality and promoting gender equality. Female genital mutilation, while not widespread, is practiced in some local communities.

In the 2024 Global Hunger Index, Malawi's score is 21.9, which indicates a serious level of hunger. Malawi is ranked 93rd out of 127 countries.

=== Education ===
Public expenditure on education in Southern Africa as a share of GDP, 2012 or closest year

In 1994, free primary education for all children was established by the government, and primary education has been compulsory since the passage of the Revised Education Act in 2012. As a result, enrollment rates for primary schools went up from 58% in 1992 to 75% in 2007. The percentage of students who begin standard one and complete standard five has increased from 64% in 1992 to 86% in 2006. According to the World Bank, youth literacy had also increased from 68% in 2000 to 75% in 2015. This increase is primarily attributed to improved learning materials in schools, better infrastructure and feeding programs that have been implemented throughout the school system. However, attendance in the secondary school falls to approximately 25%, and is not free, with attendance rates being slightly higher for males. Dropout rates are higher for girls than boys.

Education comprises eight years of primary education, four years of secondary school and four years of university. There are four public universities: Mzuzu University, Lilongwe University of Agriculture and Natural Resources, the University of Malawi and Malawi University of Science and Technology. There are also private universities, such as Livingstonia, Malawi Lakeview, and Catholic University of Malawi. The entry requirement is six credits on the Malawi School Certificate of Education, which is equivalent to O levels.

== Military ==
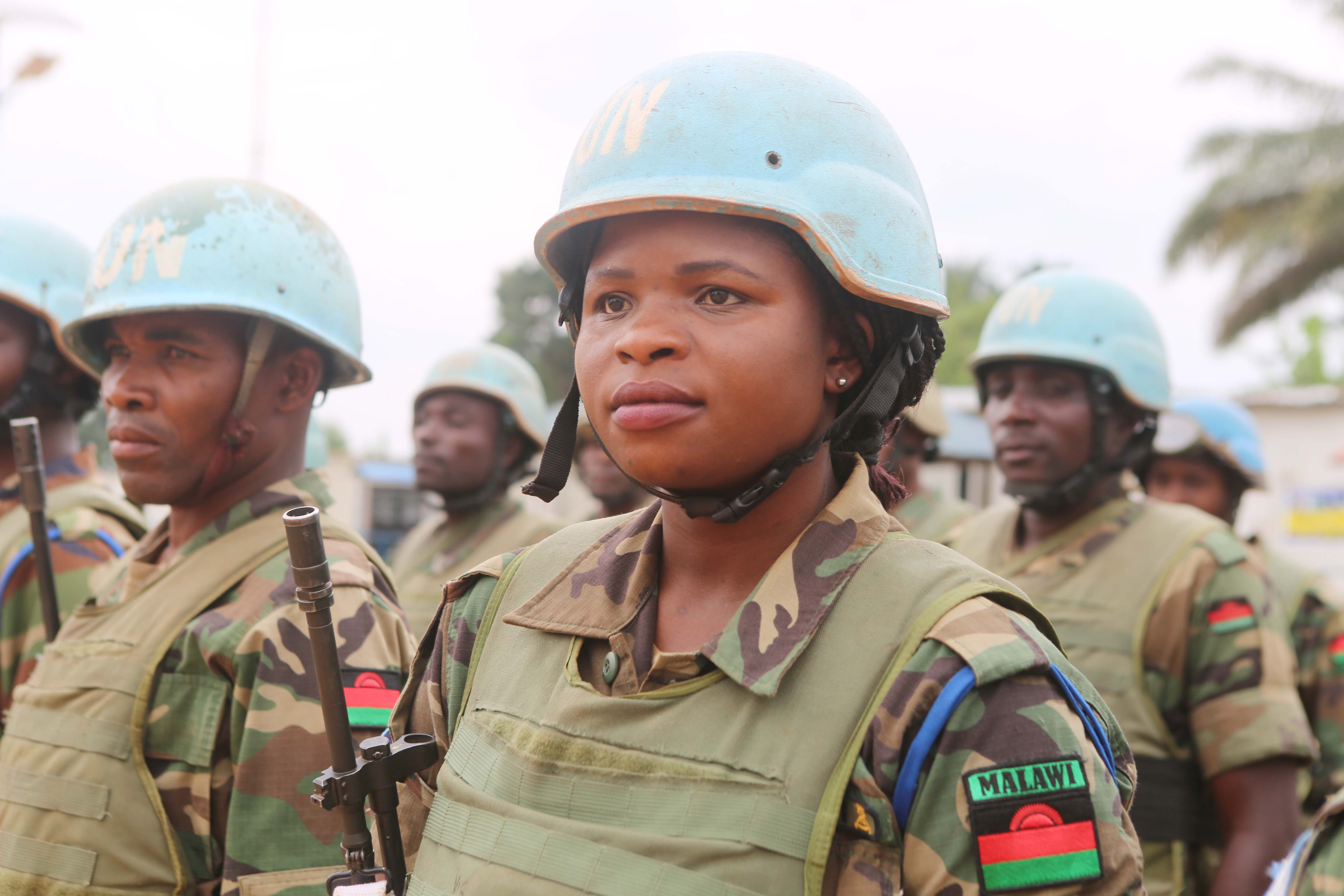
Malawian female soldier

Malawi maintains a small standing military of approximately 25,000. It consists of army, navy and air force elements. The Malawi Army originated from British colonial units formed before independence. It is made of two rifle regiments and one parachute regiment. The Malawi Air Force was established with German help in 1976, and operates a small number of transport aircraft and multi-purpose helicopters. The Malawian Navy was established in the early 1970s with Portuguese support, presently having three vessels operating on Lake Malawi, based in Monkey Bay. In 2017, Malawi signed the UN Treaty on the Prohibition of Nuclear Weapons.

== Culture ==
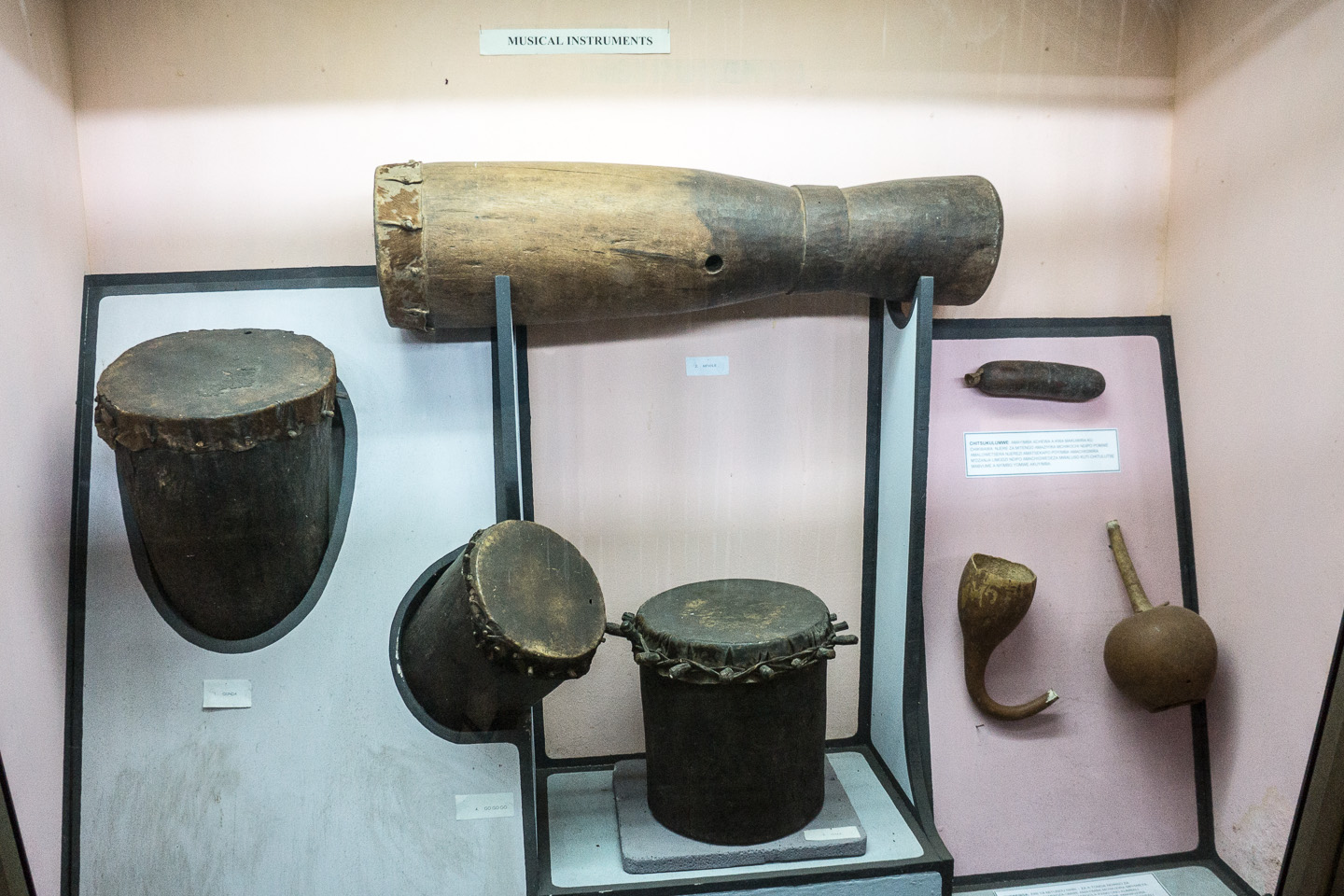
Musical instruments of Malawi

The name "Malawi" comes from the Maravi, a Bantu ethnic group who emigrated from the southern Congo around 1400 AD. Over the past century, ethnic distinctions have diminished to the point where there is no significant inter-ethnic friction, although regional divisions still occur. The concept of a Malawian nationality has begun to form around predominantly rural people who are generally conservative and traditionally nonviolent. The "Warm Heart of Africa" nickname was given to the country due to the perceived loving nature of the Malawian people.

The flag of Malawi is made up of three equal horizontal stripes of black, red, and green with a red rising sun superimposed in the center of the black stripe. The black stripe represents the African people, the red represents the blood of martyrs for African freedom, green represents Malawi's ever-green nature, and the rising sun represents the dawn of freedom and hope for Africa.

The National Dance Troupe (formerly the Kwacha Cultural Troupe) was formed in 1987 by the government. Traditional music and dances can be seen at initiation rites, rituals, marriage ceremonies and celebrations. The indigenous ethnic groups have a tradition of basketry and mask carving. Wood carving and oil painting are also popular in more urban centres, with many of the items produced being sold to tourists. There are several internationally recognised literary figures, including poet Jack Mapanje, history and fiction writer Paul Zeleza and author Legson Kayira.

=== Media ===
Radio, television and postal services are regulated by the Malawi Communications Regulatory Authority. There are 20 television stations on the country's digital network MDBNL. Television Malawi, run by the Malawi Broadcasting Corporation (MBC), is the national public broadcaster of Malawi. Established under an Act of Parliament in 1964, MBC operates both radio and television services.

=== Sports ===
Football is the most common sport in Malawi, introduced during British colonial rule. Malawi's women's national team first qualified for the 2027 Women's World Cup by making it to the semi-final of the 2026 Women's Africa Cup of Nations. Its men's national team has failed to qualify for a World Cup but has made three appearances in the Africa Cup of Nations. Football teams include the Mighty Wanderers, Big Bullets, Silver Strikers, Blue Eagles, Civo Sporting, Moyale Barracks, and Mighty Tigers. Basketball is growing in popularity, but its national team is yet to participate in any international competition. More success has been found in netball, with the Malawi national netball team ranked sixth in the world (as of March 2021).

=== Cuisine ===
Malawian cuisine is diverse, with tea and fish being popular features of the country's cuisine. Sugar, coffee, corn, potatoes, sorghum, cattle, and goats are also important components of the cuisine and economy. Lake Malawi is a source of fish, including chambo (similar to bream), usipa (similar to sardines), and mpasa (similar to salmon and kampango). Nsima is a food staple made from ground corn and typically served with side dishes of meat and vegetables. It is commonly eaten for lunch and dinner.

== See also ==
- Outline of Malawi
- Telephone numbers in Malawi
- Women in Africa

== Sources ==
- Cutter, Charles H. (2006). Africa 2006 (41st ed.). Harpers Ferry, West Virginia: Stryker-Post Publications. ISBN 1-887985-72-7.
- Davidson, Basil (1991). Africa in History: Themes and Outlines (Revised and Expanded ed.). New York: Collier Books, Macmillan Publishing Company. ISBN 0-02-042791-3.
- Dickovick, J. Tyler (2008). Africa 2008 (43rd ed.). Harpers Ferry, West Virginia: Stryker-Post Publications. ISBN 978-1-887985-90-1.
- Meredith, Martin (2005). The Fate of Africa – From the Hopes of Freedom to the Heart of Despair: A History of 50 Years of Independence. New York: Public Affairs. ISBN 1-58648-246-7.
- Murphy, Philip, ed. (2005). Central Africa: Closer Association 1945–1958. London, UK: The Stationery Office. ISBN 0-11-290586-2.
- Reader, John (1999). Africa: A Biography of the Continent (First Vintage Books ed.). New York: Vintage Books. ISBN 0-679-73869-X.
- Turner, Barry, ed. (2008). The Statesman's Yearbook 2009: The Politics, Cultures and Economies of the World. Macmillan Publishers. ISBN 978-1-4039-9278-9.
- Willie Molesi, Black Africa versus Arab North Africa: The Great Divide, ISBN 979-8332308994
- Willie Molesi, Relations Between Africans and Arabs: Harsh Realities,ISBN 979-8334767546
- Willie Molesi, Africans and Indians: The Gulf Between, ISBN 979-8338818190
